= List of Spanish painters =

This is a list of notable painters from, or associated with, Spain.

== A ==
- Juan Martínez Abades
- Juan de la Abadía
- Maria de Abarca
- Cristóbal de Acevedo
- Manuel Acevedo
- Ramón Acín
- María del Adalid
- Joaquín Agrasot
- Benito Manuel Agüero
- José Aguiar
- Tomas de Aguiar
- Miguel del Aguila
- Diego de Aguilar
- Jorge Aguilar-Agon
- Francisco de Aguirre
- Lorenzo Aguirre
- Manuel Aguirre y Monsalbe
- Francisco Agullo
- Francisco Agustín y Grande
- Francisco Albert
- Andres Alcantara
- Arnau Alemany
- Leonardo Alenza
- Juan de Alfaro y Gámez
- Juan Alfon
- Germán Álvarez Algeciras
- Luís Alimbrot
- José Casado del Alisal
- Fernando Yáñez de la Almedina
- Ramon Martí Alsina
- Andrés Amaya
- Francisco de Amberes
- Begoña Ameztoy
- Mariano Andreu
- Olga Andrino
- Francisco Antolínez
- José Antolínez
- José Aparicio
- José Jiménez Aranda
- Fermín Arango
- Antonio Sánchez Araujo
- Alonso del Arco
- Teodoro Ardemans
- Juan de Arellano
- Juan Ramírez de Arellano
- Antonio de Arfian
- Kiko Argüello
- Antonio Fernández Arias
- Eduardo Arranz-Bravo
- Josep Arrau i Barba
- Isidoro Arredondo
- Eugenio de Arriba
- Diego de Arroyo
- Eduardo Arroyo
- José Arrue
- Ramiro Arrue
- Jorge Artajo
- Matias de Arteaga
- Aurelio Arteta
- Francisco de Artiga
- Diego de Astor
- Jerónima de la Asunción
- Luis Eduardo Aute
- Serafín Avendaño
- Hernando de Ávila
- José María Avrial
- Bernabé de Ayala
- Fernando Zóbel de Ayala y Montojo

== B ==
- Isabel Bacardit
- Bernardo Ferrándiz Bádenes
- José Antonio Sánchez Baíllo
- Elena Bajo
- Eduardo Balaca
- José Balaca
- Ricardo Balaca
- Juan Navarro Baldeweg
- Vicenç Badalona Ballestar
- Antonia Bañuelos
- Lluís Barba
- Joaquín Bárbara y Balza
- Mariano Barbasán
- Salvador Sánchez Barbudo
- Vicente Calderón de la Barca
- Miquel Barceló
- Miguel Arias Bardou
- Sebastián Herrera Barnuevo
- Josep Tapiró Baró
- Mariana de la Cueva Benavides y Barradas
- Francisco Barrera
- Juan de Barroeta
- Ricardo Baroja
- Laureano Barrau
- Rafael Romero Barros
- Miguel Barroso
- Arnau Bassa
- Ferrer Bassa
- Nestor Basterretxea
- Gregorio Bausá
- Josefa Bayeu
- Ramón Bayeu
- Francisco Bayeu y Subías
- Juan Bautista Bayuco
- Gaspar Becerra
- Valeriano Bécquer
- Antonio Cabral Bejarano
- José Denis Belgrano
- Eduardo Benito
- José Benlliure y Gil
- Magín Berenguer
- Josep Berga i Boix
- Bartolomé Bermejo
- Martín Bernat
- Alonso Berruguete
- Pedro Berruguete
- Aureliano de Beruete
- Miquel Bestard
- Gonzalo Bilbao
- Antonio Bisquert
- María Blanchard
- Josefa Ruiz Blasco
- Geronimo de Bobadilla
- Pedro Atanasio Bocanegra
- Camil Bofill
- Laurent Le Bon
- Joan Fuster Bonnin
- Juan de Borgoña
- Nicolás Borrás
- Lluís Borrassà
- Alfons Borrell i Palazón
- Juan Rodríguez Botas
- Ángel Botello
- Juan Antonio García de Bouzas
- Fernando Brambila
- Julio Peris Brell
- Narciso Méndez Bringa
- Elena Brockmann
- Joan Brotat
- Ayne Bru
- Mosen Vicente Bru
- Roser Bru
- Salvador Bru
- Antonio Brugada
- Joan Brull
- Francisco Bustamante
- Encarnación Bustillo Salomón
- Ambrosio Martínez Bustos

== C ==
- Antoni Caba
- Javier Cabada
- Andrea López Caballero
- José Caballero
- Lita Cabellut
- Juan Martín Cabezalero
- Francisco Sans Cabot
- Manuel Cabré
- Margarita Cabrera
- Andrés de la Calleja
- Ricardo Arredondo Calmache
- Hermenegildo Anglada Camarasa
- Ignacio Pinazo Camarlench
- José Camarón Bonanat
- Orazio Cambiasi
- Francisco Camilo
- Pedro Campaña
- Pedro de Campolargo
- Pedro de Camprobín
- Ricard Canals
- Miguel Navarro Cañizares
- Alonso Cano
- José María Cano
- Antonio Guzmán Capel
- Vicenç Caraltó
- Juan de Valdés Carasquilla
- Peris Carbonell
- José Moreno Carbonero
- Felipe Cardeña
- Valentín Carderera
- Bartolomeo Carducci
- Vincenzo Carducci
- Fernando Briones Carmona
- Manuel Salvador Carmona
- Antonio Carnicero
- Francisco Caro
- Maria Luisa Carranque y Bonavía
- Ricardo Urgell Carreras
- Luis de Carvajal
- Carlos Casagemas
- Lorenzo Casanova
- Juan Francisco Casas
- Ramon Casas
- Pere Borrell del Caso
- Abdón Castañeda
- Yolanda Castaño
- Joan Castejón
- Vicente Castell
- Manuel Castellano
- Fabrizio Castello
- Félix Castello
- Federico Castellón
- Claudio Castelucho
- Agustín del Castillo
- Carolina del Castillo Díaz (1867–1933)
- Jorge Castillo
- José del Castillo
- Juan del Castillo
- Antonio del Castillo y Saavedra
- Antonio Castrejon
- Pedro Sánchez de Castro
- Luis Álvarez Catalá
- Bartolomeo Cavarozzi
- Eugenio Caxés
- Mateo Cerezo
- Pablo de Céspedes
- Manuel Chabrera
- Charris
- Felipe Checa
- Ulpiano Checa
- José de Cieza
- Miguel Jerónimo de Cieza
- Romulo Cincinato
- Isabel de Cisneros
- Francisco Clapera
- Aleix Clapés
- Antoni Clavé
- Pelegrí Clavé
- Antonio Vela Cobo
- Alonso Sánchez Coello
- Claudio Coello
- Pau Faner Coll
- Francisco Collantes
- Josep Collell
- Jaime Colson
- Francisco de Comontes
- Andrés de la Concha
- Félix de la Concha
- Miguel Condé
- Emília Coranty Llurià
- José Villegas Cordero
- Joaquín Lloréns Fernández de Cordoba
- Gabriel de la Corte
- Juan de la Corte
- Ángel María Cortellini
- Jerónimo Cosida
- Juan Sánchez Cotán
- Adelardo Covarsí
- Giovanni Battista Crescenzi
- Juan Pantoja de la Cruz
- Manuel de la Cruz
- Salvador Martínez Cubells
- María Ángeles Fernández Cuesta
- Pedro de las Cuevas
- Modest Cuixart
- Josep Cusachs

== D ==
- Pierre Daix
- Salvador Dalí
- Lluís Dalmau
- Miguel Danus
- María Dávila
- Antonio Muñoz Degrain
- Ramón Destorrents
- Daniel Vázquez Díaz
- Diego Valentín Díaz
- Felipe Diricksen
- Giovanni Do
- Óscar Domínguez
- Francesc d'A. Planas Doria
- Françoise Duparc
- Pedro Duque y Cornejo

== E ==
- Baltasar de Echave
- Juan de Echevarría
- Rogelio de Egusquiza
- Feliu Elias
- Eleazar
- Ramon de Elorriaga
- Miriam Escofet
- Joseba Eskubi
- Joaquim Espalter
- Argimiro España
- Juan de Espinal
- Benito Espinós
- Jerónimo Jacinto de Espinosa
- Jerónimo Rodríguez de Espinosa
- Juan de Espinosa
- Juan Bautista de Espinosa
- Antonio María Esquivel
- Agustín Esteve
- Jose Etxenagusia
- Gerónimo Antonio de Ezquerra

== F ==
- Antonio Fabrés
- Nicolás Factor
- Manuel Carnicer Fajó
- Juan Conchillos Falco
- Luis Ricardo Falero
- Antonio Cortina Farinós
- Fernando San Martín Félez
- Alejo Fernández
- Francisco Fernández
- Luis Fernández
- Virgilio Ruiz Fernández
- Alejandro Ferrant y Fischermans
- Isidoro Lázaro Ferré
- Maties Palau Ferré
- Pedro García Ferrer
- Asunción Ferrer y Crespí
- Augusto Ferrer-Dalmau
- Dionisio Fierros
- Domènec Fita i Molat
- Juan de Flandes
- Jordi Forniés
- Marià Fortuny
- Alfonso Fraile
- Esteban Francés
- Nicolás Francés
- Plácido Francés y Pascual
- Manuel Franquelo
- Juan Antonio de Frías y Escalante
- Jesus Fuertes
- Felícia Fuster

== G ==
- Antonio Ortiz Gacto
- Gervasio Gallardo
- Blas Gallego
- Fernando Gallego
- Baldomer Galofre
- José Galofré y Coma
- Enric Galwey
- Sofía Gandarias
- Juan José Gárate
- Daniel Garbade
- Antonio López García
- Pedro Flores García
- Manuel García y Rodríguez
- Pablo Gargallo
- José Garnelo
- Elvira Gascón
- Agustin Gasull
- Josep Gausachs
- Alejandrina Gessler y Lacroix
- Baldomer Gili i Roig
- José Manuel Broto Gimeno
- Vicente Giner
- Antonio Gisbert
- Simó Gómez
- Vicente Salvador Gómez
- Manuel Gómez-Moreno González
- Julio González (sculptor)
- Teo González
- Alejandro González Velázquez
- Bartolomé González y Serrano
- Luis Gordillo
- Xavier Gosé
- Francisco Goya
- Félix Granda
- Antonio Fillol Granell
- Eugenio Granell
- Niccolò Granello
- Blasco de Grañén
- Lluís Graner
- Jorge Grau
- El Greco
- Juan Gris
- Pierre Le Guennec
- José Guerrero
- Adolfo Guiard
- Manuel Ussel de Guimbarda
- Josep Guinovart
- Vicente Guirri
- Juan Simón Gutiérrez

== H ==
- Carlos de Haes
- Juan van der Hamen
- Eugenio Hermoso
- José Hernández
- Francisco Hernández Tomé
- José Cruz Herrera
- Francisco Herrera the Elder
- Francisco Herrera the Younger
- José García Hidalgo
- Antonio L'Horfelin
- Gaspar de la Huerta
- Jaume Huguet

== I ==
- Concha Ibáñez
- Agustín Ibarrola
- Jorge Inglés
- Joaquín Inza y Ainsa
- Ignacio de Iriarte
- Juan Ismael
- Francisco Iturrino
- Alicia Iturrioz

== J ==
- Jacomart
- Juan de Jáuregui
- Juan Galván Jiménez
- Miguel Jaume y Bosch
- Laurent Jiménez-Balaguer
- Carmen Jiménez (1920–2016)
- Matías Jimeno
- Esprit Jouffret
- Fernando Márquez Joya
- Ana Juan
- Juan Rodríguez Juárez
- Asensio Julià

== L ==
- Juan Fernández el Labrador
- Antón Lamazares
- Francisco Lameyer
- José Lamiel
- Antonio de Lanchares
- Víctor Patricio de Landaluze
- Diego Lara
- Jesús Mari Lazkano
- Abigail Lazkoz
- Juan de Valdés Leal
- Simón de León Leal
- Blas de Ledesma
- Clara Ledesma
- José de Ledesma
- Pablo Legote
- Cristóbal de León
- Felipe de León
- Jean Paul Leon
- Juan Valdemira de León
- Ignacio de León Salcedo
- Agustín Leonardo
- José Leonardo
- Francisco Leonardoni
- Andrés Leyto
- Diego de Leyva
- Felipe de Liaño
- Juan de Licalde
- Diego Vidal de Liendo
- Isaac Lievendal
- Buonaventura Ligli
- Esteban Lisa
- Francisco Llamas
- Hernando de los Llanos
- Sebastián de Llanos y Valdés
- Cristóbal Lloréns
- Bernardo Germán de Llórente
- Otho Lloyd
- Alejandro de Loarte
- Juan de Loaysa y Giron
- Baltasar Lobo
- Cristóbal López (18th century)
- Diego López
- Francisco López (16th-century painter)
- Francisco López (17th-century painter)
- Jaime López
- Josef López
- Pedro López
- Francisco López Caro
- Francisco Lopez y Palomino
- Roberto López Corrales
- Claudi Lorenzale
- Alejandro Lozano
- Antonio Rodríguez Luna
- José Luzán

== M ==
- Ricardo Macarrón
- Pedro Machuca
- Federico de Madrazo
- Luis de Madrazo
- Ricardo de Madrazo
- José de Madrazo y Agudo
- Raimundo de Madrazo y Garreta
- Federico de Madrazo y Ochoa
- Mariano Salvador Maella
- Juan Bautista Maíno
- Maruja Mallo
- Roberto Mangú
- César Manrique
- Miguel Manrique
- Francisco de Burgos Mantilla
- Esteban March
- Vicente March
- Pedro de Villegas Marmolejo
- Francisco Domingo Marqués
- Luis Marsans
- José Martí y Monsó
- Raúl Martín
- Asterio Mañanós Martínez
- Antonio Alonso Martinez
- Crisóstomo Martínez
- Elías García Martínez
- Jusepe Martínez
- Juan Bautista Martínez del Mazo
- María Teresa Martín-Vivaldi
- Bernat Martorell
- Andrés Marzo
- Joan Mas
- Arcadi Mas i Fondevila
- Vicente Masip
- Vicente Juan Masip
- Francesc Masriera
- Josep Masriera
- Federico Beltrán Masses
- Master of Arguis
- Master of Castelsardo
- Master of Pedret
- Master of Riglos
- Master of Taüll
- Master of the Cypresses
- Master of the Retablo of the Reyes Catolicos
- Jaume Mateu
- Fidel Roig Matons
- Fabio McNamara
- Nicolás Megía
- Eliseu Meifrèn
- Luis Egidio Meléndez
- María Juana Hurtado de Mendoza
- Francisca Efigenia Meléndez y Durazzo
- Felipe Gil de Mena
- Carmen Babiano Méndez-Núñez
- Benet Mercadé
- Saülo Mercader
- Jesus de Miguel
- Manolo Millares
- Francesc Miralles i Galaup
- Rosa Mirambell i Càceres
- Juan Carreño de Miranda
- Juan García de Miranda
- Pedro Rodríguez de Miranda
- Joan Miró
- Gabriel Móger
- Antonio Mohedano
- Ángel Lizcano Monedero
- Bartolomé Montalvo
- Rafael Monleón
- Luis de Morales
- Matías Moreno
- Jacint Morera
- Jaume Morera i Galícia
- Pedro de Moya
- Evaristo Muñoz
- Glòria Muñoz
- Bartolomé Esteban Murillo
- José Ramón Muro

== N ==
- Carlos Nadal
- Eduardo Naranjo
- Angelo Nardi
- Juan Fernández Navarrete
- Eva Navarro
- Jorge Velasco Navarro
- José Navarro
- Miquel Navarro
- Rafael Navarro
- Jerónimo Navases
- José Nicolau Huguet (1855–1909)
- Antonio Juez Nieto
- Romeo Niram
- Isidre Nonell
- Pilar Nouvilas i Garrigolas
- Requena Nozal
- Marina Núñez

== O ==
- Josefa de Óbidos
- Pedro de Obregón
- Jenaro de Urrutia Olaran
- Agustín Olguera
- Eugenio Oliva
- Fausto Olivares
- Ceferí Olivé
- Fernande Olivier
- Quintana Olleras
- Ricard Opisso
- Gaston Orellana
- Angel Orensanz
- José Sanfrancisco Orero
- Pedro Orrente
- Manuel Ortega
- Francisco Pradilla Ortiz
- Francisco de Osona
- Rodrigo de Osona
- Francisco Meneses Osorio

== P ==
- Francisco Pacheco
- Francesco Pagano
- Jordi Pagans i Monsalvatje
- Francisco de Palacios
- Pablo Palazuelo
- Benjamín Palencia
- Gaetano Palmaroli
- Vicente Palmaroli
- Antonio Palomino
- Robert Pérez Palou
- Juan de Pareja
- Marcial Gómez Parejo
- Luis Paret y Alcázar
- Josep Pascó i Mensa
- Francisco de Paula Van Halen
- Joan Comas Pausas
- Pedro Pedraja
- Fernand Pelez
- Josep Lluís Pellicer
- Rafael de Penagos
- Juan de Peñalosa
- Jesús Peñarreal
- Antonio de Pereda
- Alonso Pérez
- Andrés Pérez
- Antonio Bisquert Pérez
- Bartolomé Pérez
- Gonzalo Pérez
- María Luisa Pérez Herrero (1898–1934)
- Sara Rojo Pérez
- Lorenzo Pericás
- Emilio Sánchez Perrier
- Pablo Picasso
- Ramon Pichot
- Luis Menéndez Pidal
- Joaquim Pijoan i Arbocer
- Adrià Pina
- Bernardo López Piquer
- Luis López Piquer
- Antoni Pitxot
- Alberto Pla y Rubio
- Cecilio Plá
- Josefina Tanganelli Plana
- Juan Batlle Planas
- Angel Planells
- Francisco del Plano
- Casto Plasencia
- Andrés López Polanco
- Bernardo Polo
- Diego Polo the Elder
- Diego Polo the Younger
- Roque Ponce
- Pablo Pontons
- Antonio Ponz
- Jaime Mosen Ponz
- Alardo de Popma
- Vicente López Portaña
- Miguel Posadas
- Pedro Pozo
- Blas de Prado
- Francisco Preciado
- Tomás Francisco Prieto
- Andrea Procaccini
- Dióscoro Puebla
- Antonio de Puga
- José Puyet

== Q ==
- Nicolás de la Quadra
- José Comas Quesada
- Cristóbal Hernández de Quintana
- Isabel Quintanilla
- Lorenzo Quiros

== R ==
- Pablo Rabiella
- Eva Raboso
- Albert Ràfols-Casamada
- Carlos González Ragel
- Andrea Ramirez
- Benevides Juan Ramirez
- Cristóbal Ramírez
- Felipe Ramírez
- Gerónimo Ramírez
- Josef Ramírez
- Juan Ramírez
- Pedro Ramírez
- Joan Ramos
- Theo Ramos
- Guillem Ramos-Poquí
- Jorge Rando
- Juan Bautista Ravanals
- Isidoro de Redondillo
- Darío de Regoyos
- Antonio García Reinoso
- Vicente Requena the Elder
- Juan Rexach
- Gabino Rey
- Pablo Rey
- Francisco de Reyna
- Francesc Ribalta
- Juan Ribalta
- Hernán Picó Ribera
- Juan Antonio Ribera
- Juan Vicente Ribera
- Jusepe de Ribera
- Romà Ribera
- Carlos Luis de Ribera y Fieve
- David López Ribes
- Eulàlia Ferrer Ribot
- Antonio Richarte
- Martín Rico
- Ignacio de Ries
- Lluís Rigalt
- Antonio del Rincón
- Alexandre de Riquer
- Jose Risueño
- Francisco Rizi
- Juan Rizi
- Juan de las Roelas
- María Roësset Mosquera
- Marisa Roësset Velasco
- José Roma
- Bartolomé Román
- Pedro Romana
- José Romeo
- Covadonga Romero Rodríguez
- Luis Ortiz Rosales
- Joaquín Luque Roselló
- Francisco Riba Rovira
- Eduardo Rosales
- Luis Royo
- Romulo Royo
- Dámaso Ruano
- Joaquín Bernardo Rubert
- José Ruiz y Blasco
- Santiago Rusiñol

== S ==
- Jaime Sabartés
- Paquita Sabrafen
- Olga Sacharoff
- Arthur Sachs
- Manuel Sáez
- Casimiro Sainz
- Emilio Grau Sala
- Emilio Sala (painter)
- Cristóbal García Salmerón
- Francisco Salmerón
- Matilde Salvador i Segarra
- Alfonso Grosso Sánchez
- Mariano Ramón Sánchez
- Pepi Sánchez
- Bernat Sanjuan
- Sanjulián
- Antonio Saura
- Josep Segrelles
- Vicente Segrelles
- Miquel Carbonell Selva
- Eusebio Sempere
- Jaume Serra
- Pere Serra
- Michel Serre
- Josep Maria Sert
- Soledad Sevilla
- José María Sicilia
- Francisco Pérez Sierra
- Mariana de Silva-Bazán y Sarmiento
- Francesca Stuart Sindici
- Josep Costa Sobrepera
- José Gutiérrez Solana
- Josep Rovira Soler
- Rigoberto Soler
- Quinta del Sordo
- Joaquín Sorolla
- Fernando Álvarez de Sotomayor y Zaragoza
- Aurelio Suárez
- Alvar Suñol
- Joaquim Sunyer

== T ==
- Antoni Tàpies
- Antoni Taulé
- Fernando Tarazona
- Juan Caro de Tavira
- Rafael Tegeo
- Jorge Manuel Theotocópuli
- Rafel Tona
- Néstor Martín-Fernández de la Torre
- Clemente de Torres
- Josefa Texidor Torres
- Julio Romero de Torres
- Ramón Castellano de Torres
- Xavier Navarro de Torres
- Joaquín Torres-García
- Ángeles Santos Torroella
- Alonso Miguel de Tovar
- Manuela Trasobares
- Joaquin Mir Trinxet
- Luis Tristán
- Ramón Tusquets y Maignon
- Joan Tuset i Suau

== U ==
- Juan de Uceda
- Pedro de Uceda
- Marcelino de Unceta
- Pablo Uranga
- Eduardo Úrculo
- Modest Urgell
- José de Urrutia y de las Casas
- Juan Uslé

== V ==
- Francisco Vera Cabeza de Vaca
- Lucas de Valdés
- Manolo Valdés
- Domingo Valdivieso
- Cristóbal Valero
- Pedro Núñez del Valle
- Dino Valls
- Xavier Valls
- Francisco Varela
- Juan Varela
- Andrés de Vargas
- Luis de Vargas
- Remedios Varo
- Joaquim Vayreda
- Marian Vayreda i Vila
- Alonso Vázquez
- Dolors Vázquez Aznar
- José Gutiérrez de la Vega
- Cristóbal Vela
- Esteban Márquez de Velasco
- Rosario de Velasco
- Antonio González Velázquez
- Diego Velázquez
- Eugenio Lucas Velázquez
- Luis González Velázquez
- Zacarías González Velázquez
- Francisco Venegas
- Alejo Vera
- Cristobal de Vera
- Dionisio Baixeras Verdaguer
- Esteban Vicente
- Ignasi Vidal
- Lluïsa Vidal
- Antoni Vila Arrufat
- Julio Vila y Prades
- Antoni Viladomat
- Xevi Vilaró
- Eugenio Lucas Villaamil
- Jenaro Pérez Villaamil
- Nicolás de Villacis
- Darío Villalba
- Cristóbal de Villalpando
- Rodrigo de Villandrando
- Pedro Nuñez de Villavicencio
- Juan de Villoldo
- Javier de Villota
- Salvador Viniegra
- Miguel García Vivancos
- Juan Correa de Vivar

== W ==
- Eduardo Westerdahl

== X ==
- Juan Ximenez
- Miguel Ximénez
- Rafael Ximeno y Planes

== Y ==
- Tomás Yepes

== Z ==
- Esperanza Zabala
- Alonso de Llera Zambrano
- Eduardo Zamacois y Zabala
- José Vela Zanetti
- José Antonio Zapata
- Juan Zariñena
- Rosario Weiss Zorrilla
- Daniel Zuloaga
- Ignacio Zuloaga
- Manuel Osorio Manrique de Zúñiga
- Francisco de Zurbarán
- Juan de Zurbarán
