= Pedro Ramírez =

Pedro Ramírez may refer to:

- Pedro J. Ramírez (born 1952), Spanish journalist
- Pedro Ramírez (baseball) (born 2004), Venezuelan infielder
- Pedro Ramírez (footballer, born 1992), Venezuelan footballer
- Pedro Ramírez (footballer, born 2000), Argentine footballer
- Pedro Ramírez (painter), Spanish painter
- Pedro Ramírez (sport shooter) (born 1939), Puerto Rican Olympic shooter
- Pedro Pablo Ramírez (1884–1962), President of Argentina
- Pedro Ramírez Vázquez (1919–2013), Mexican architect
