= Vilaró =

Vilaró is a surname. Notable people with the surname include:

- Andrea Vilaró (born 1993), Spanish basketball player
- Carlos Páez Vilaró (1923–2014), Uruguayan abstract artist, painter, potter, sculptor, muralist, writer, composer, and constructor
- Xevi Vilaró (born 1975), Spanish painter
