= Orero =

Orero may refer to:

== People ==
- Baldassarre Orero (1841–1914), Italian general
- José Sanfrancisco Orero (born 1944), Spanish painter, sculptor, poet and writer

== Places ==
- Orero, Liguria, Italy
- Orero, Serra Riccò, Italy
