= Fernando San Martín Félez =

Spanish painter

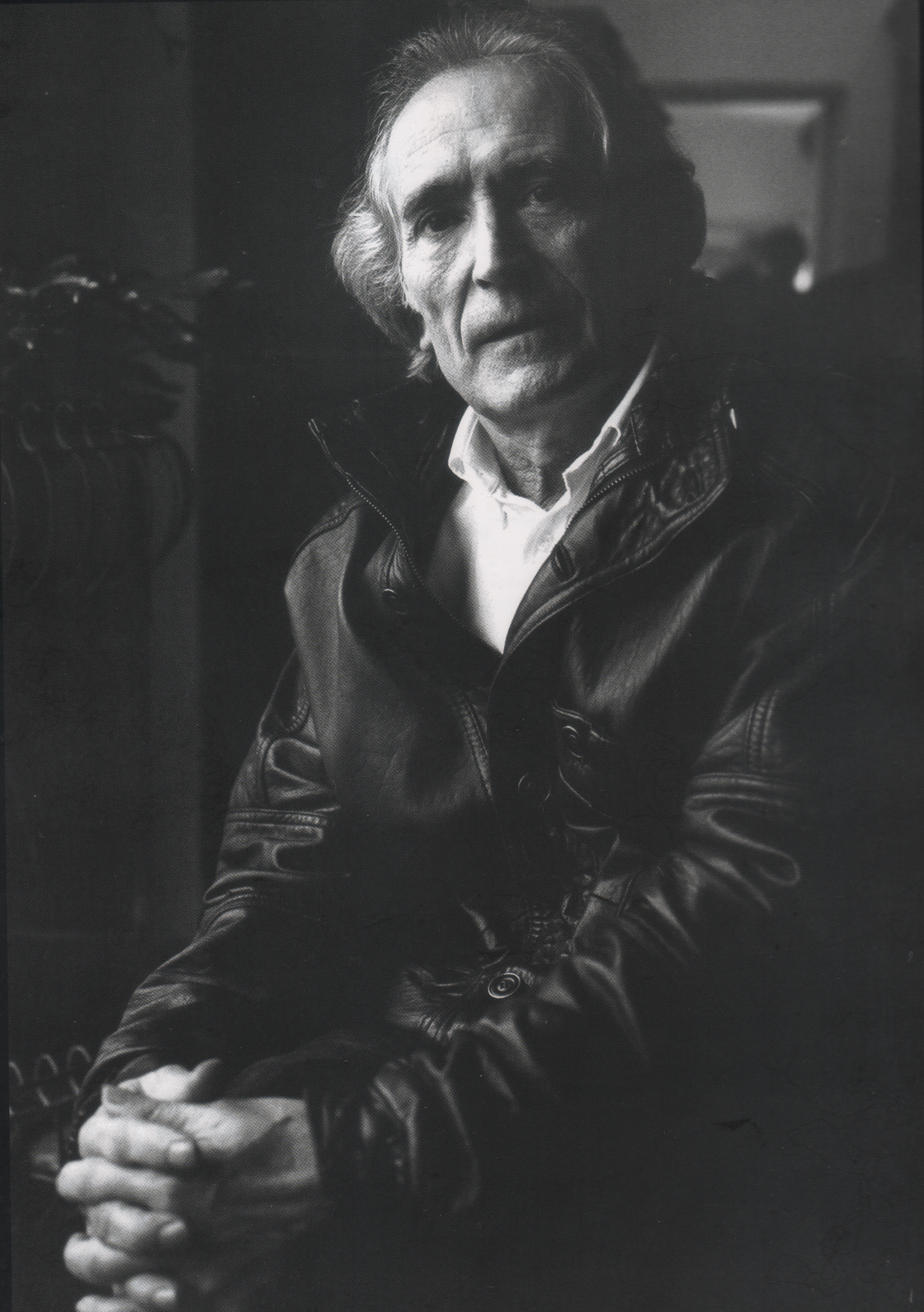
- Occupation: artist

Fernando San Martin Félez (Signature: S.M. Félez; born in Zaragoza, September 4, 1930 and died in Garriguella, June 2, 2020) was a Spanish artist of the "Pánico" movement.

He was born in Zaragoza. In his childhood his family moved to Barcelona, where he spent his childhood and adolescence. He studied at the Llotja (art school) and Fine Arts in Barcelona, where he studied art history, perspective, drawing, painting and printmaking which won the Award of Merit. He graduated in Barcelona in 1955 and soon became his first abstract paintings.

In 1959, he traveled to France and plans to settle in Paris after completing his military service and complete his art studies in Barcelona. In 1955 he leaves the studies when entering the abstraction. He moved to Paris in 1957 and entered the School of Fine Arts in Paris where he studied printmaking (Lithography).

== Artistic trend ==
In 1958 he meets Fernando Arrabal, Roland Topor and Alejandro Joborowsky, founders of "Panic" Movement. Earlier this year, along with painters Evarist Vallès, Alberto Plaza, José CANES, Jean-Claude Fiaux, Jacques Albertini, the sculptor Alberto Guzman and writer Charles Juliet created the "Movement" group, for plastic affinities.

Develops the first pictures "panics" in 1964 with the realization of portraits of F. Arrabal, combining this year with abstraction and figuration. Until the end of it.

Having visited the retrospective exhibition of the painter Kandinsky at the Musée d'Art Moderne de la Ville de Paris, he decided to leave the abstraction permanently, given the extensive exploration that this artist made in all shapes and trends that later we met with various "isms".

Finally, in 1974 he settled in Céret (France) until 1984 it returns to Spain to settle at Guarriguella (Gerona), where he died on June 1, 2020.
