= Eva Raboso =

Spanish abstract cinematic artist

- Born: 22 December 1976 (age 49); Valencia, Spain
- Movement: Abstract expressionism
- Website: www.evaraboso.com

Eva Raboso (born 1976) is a Spanish abstract neo-expressionist cinematic artist. Eva Raboso has paintings exhibited at Venezzia Biennale The Fall of the rebel angels, Spain, Frieze Qpark Cavendish at London, Madrid and many others. Also, her works are present in collections international galleries and collections like (london) Le Dame gallery or (Madrid) David Bardía gallery.

Currently, Eva Raboso is interested in American abstract expressionism and actually London conceptual art. In abstract art she is conducting studies on the paintings of Jean Michel Basquiat, Jackson Pollock, and Victor Vasarely.

== Biography ==
Eva Raboso was born in Valencia, Spain in 1976. She was a precocious artist in actual contemporary art. In 2004, this artist began her career and since then, she is considered in the circle of british young artists, sharing exhibition with Gavin Turk as one of the interesting mixed between cinematic art and new technologic art. The artist began her career as an alternative artist. After that, she chose abstraction for her works after investigating all the artistic trends of her time.

Since the 2004, she lives and works between Madrid, and London.

She is followed closely by Jose Brinkmann and Lorenzo Belenguer.

== Work ==
Eva Raboso’s first cinematic period focused on cars and everyday life. Her work from this period has been described as sensitive and strong, and as using new techniques to present a different vision in her films.

The Abstract period begins since 2004 of the author. Works are dreamlike, still life and open landscapes natural integrated with car worlds.

- Abstract: Large format mixed techniques paintings are loaded with much pictorial material and natural pigments.
- Neo – expressionism: The work begins in the mid 2005. It consists of taking get over our own achievements.
