= Antonio de Arfian =

Spanish painter

Antonio de Arfian, (fl. 1554–1587) was a 16th-century Spanish painter.

== Life ==
A native of Triana, a suburb of Seville, he studied under Luis de Vargas. He was employed on several important works, both in fresco and in oil, including the grand altar-piece of Seville Cathedral, which he painted in 1554 in collaboration with Antonio Ruiz.

His dates of his birth and death are unrecorded; it is known that he was still alive in 1587, when, with the assistance of his son Alonzo, he painted the Legend of St. George, in the church of the Magdalene.
