= Isidoro Lázaro Ferré =

- Born: 27 April 1949; Barcelona, Catalonia, Spain
- Education: Fine Arts, Barcelona
- Known for: Painting
- Movement: Impressionism

Isidoro Lázaro Ferré (born in 1949) is a painter, draftsman and sculptor, corresponding to Impressionism. His work is in Sitges Maricel Museum, Palace The Manisterli of Cairo, The Spanish Cultural Institute Museum of Athens and the Ponce Museum of Puerto Rico.

== Life ==
=== Childhood ===
Isidoro Lázaro was born in Barcelona in 1949. He studied at the University of Fine Arts in Barcelona for six years, with special distinction in subjects such as drawing, landscape painting, perspective and anatomy.

=== Studies ===
Student of the College of Fine Arts of Sant Jordi, completed his studies in 1973. In Fine Arts studied with Juan Moncada, Jose Ribera, and Juan Crespo. Landscape with Josep Puigdengolas, Sanvisent, Jaune Muxart, Armans Miravall Bové, Julian Grau Santos and Joaquín Torrensts Lladó. Sculpture with Jaime Sala and Joan Mayné. Perspective with Ciurana.

A year after finishing his studies he exhibited for the first time in Barcelona Grifé & Escoda Gallery. In 1972 wins the landscape scholarship of the foundation Rodriguez Acosta.

=== Style ===
In the eighties: he returns to Barcelona. At that time it becomes part of the roster of painters in Sala Nonell. Paints courtyards of Cordoba and Seville and returns to Granada to paint his typical themes and fantastic gardens. Thereafter: specializes in issues more romantic, classic and formal gardens, such as English gardens, Scottish, and Welsh... also specializes in Venice, to paint the facades of churches and gothic palaces.

Exhibits his work around the world: Spain, England, Japan, USA, Argentina, Puerto Rico, Hong Kong, etc. ...

== Work ==
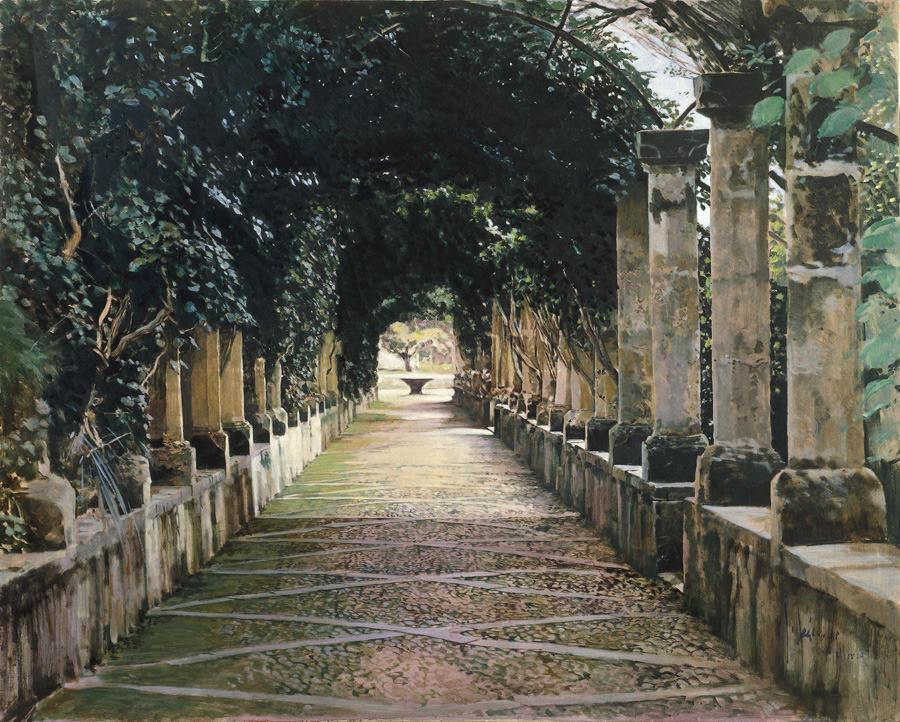
Caminal de Alfabia, Mallorca.

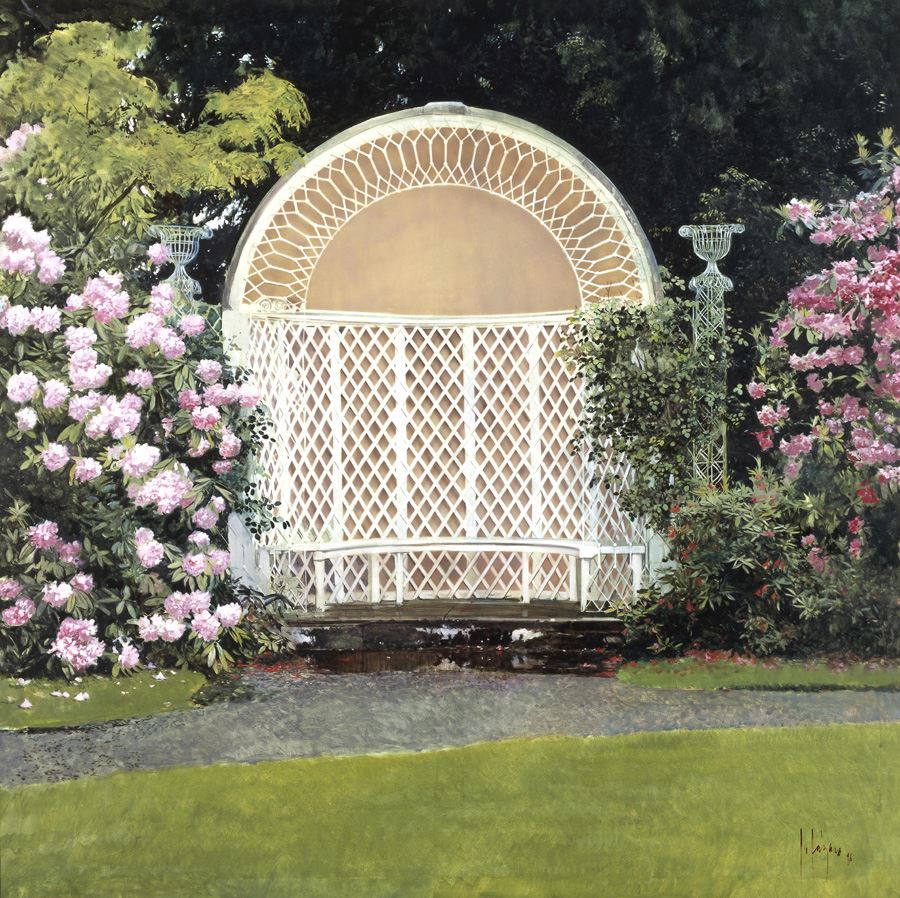
English Garden

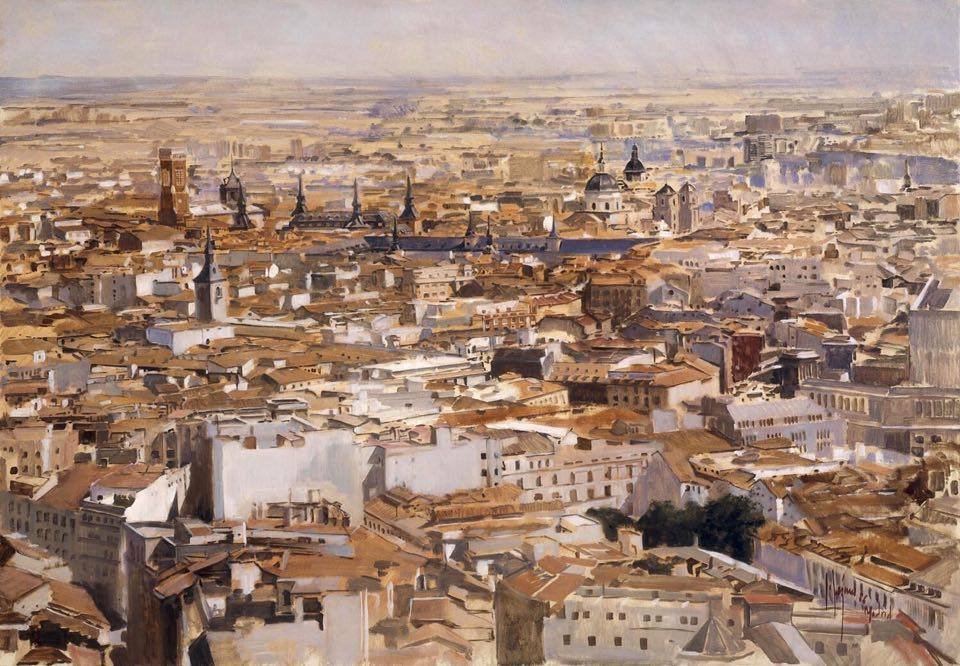
Panoramic, Madrid

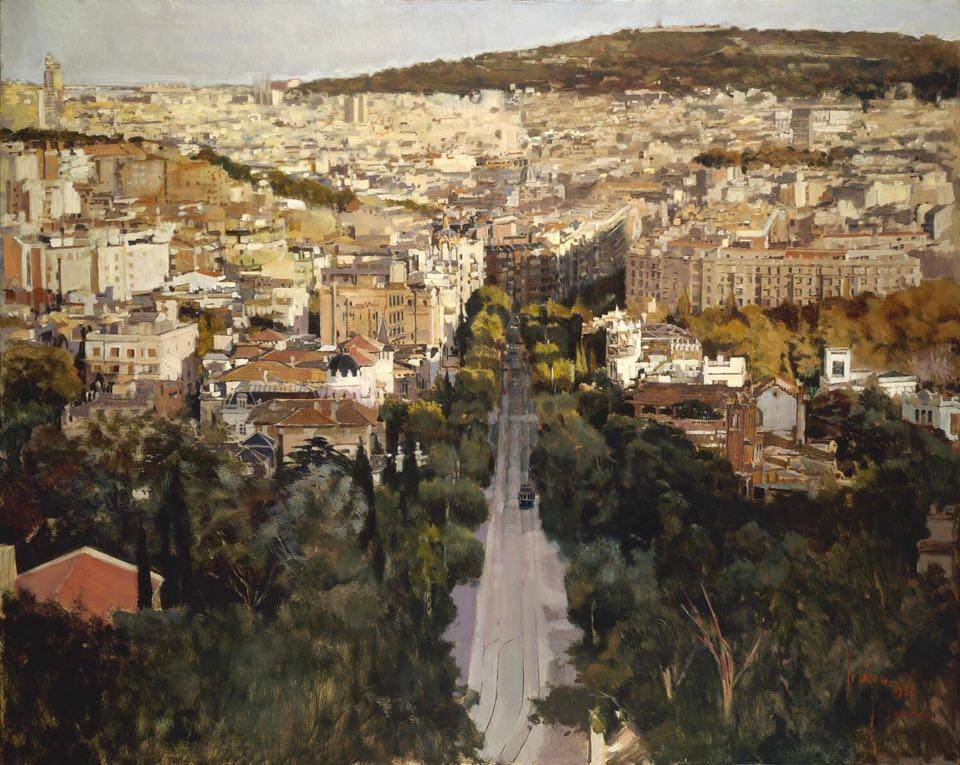
Panoramic, Barcelona

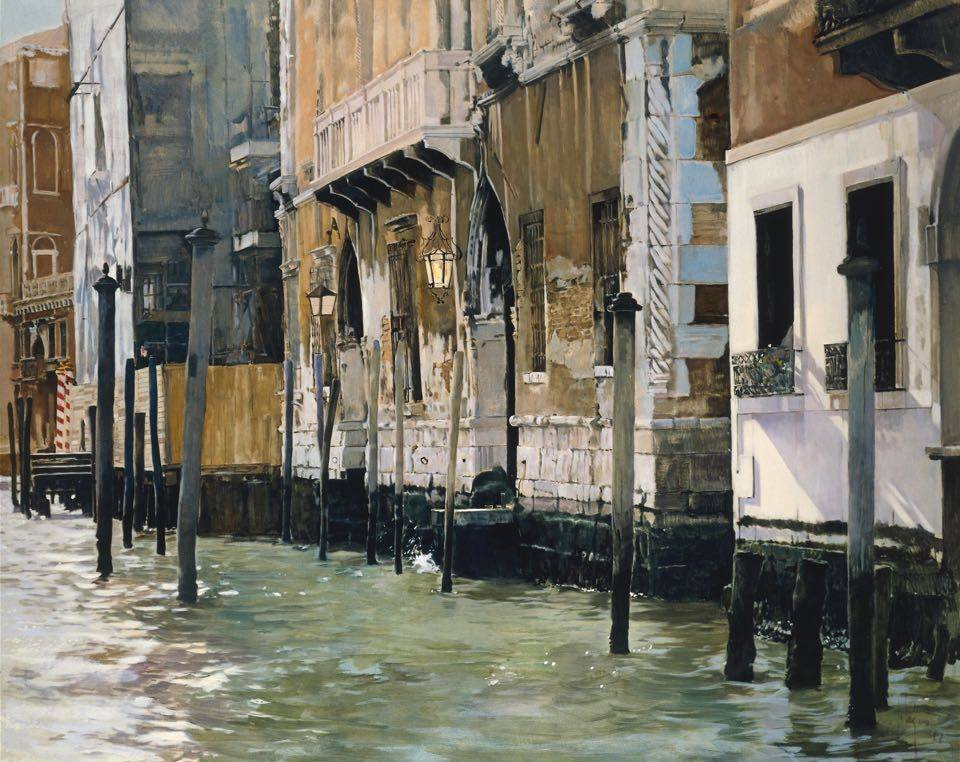
Gran Canal, Venecia

== Artist Production ==
- Has in its history the Santiago Rusiñol Prize, an artist whose influence can be seen in his work, especially in their paintings of parks, gardens and courtyard.
- The work of Isidoro Lázaro is located in the Sitges Maricel Museum, Palace The Manisterli of Cairo, in the Spanish Cultural Institute Museum of Athens and the Ponce Museum of Puerto Rico. He is a member collaborator of Mediterranean Culture.

== Bibliography ==
- Cadena, Jose María. Isidoro Lázaro y el sensual placer del buen pintar ISBN 84-404-9808-X.
- González de Vega, Javier. Espacio y atmósfera de luz. Espiral de las Artes - Año X VOLUMEN XII - NÚMERO 59 D.l.:M-1444-1993 I.S.S.N.: 1133-2794
