= Sara Rojo Pérez =

Spanish artist

Sara Rojo Pérez (born 1973 in Madrid) is a painter and artist.

She has illustrated a variety of children's books and also works for magazines like MAN and newspapers like Diario 16. Her Album No Hay Nada Como El Original was selected for the White Ravens prize in 2005 by The International Youth Library in Munich, Germany.

== Work ==
=== Illustrating ===
Some of the children's books she has illustrated include:

- No Hay Nada Como El Original (English: There is Nothing Like the Original) (Destino) written by Lawrence Schimel
- La Aventura De Cecilia Y El Dragon (English: The Adventure of Cecilia and the Dragon) (Candela/Bibliópolis) written by Lawrence Schimel
- Manual Practico Para Viajar En Ovni (English: The Manual for UFO Travel) (Candela/Bibliópolis) written by Lawrence Schimel
- Mi Gata Eureka (English: My Cat, Eureka) (Candela/Bibliópolis) written by Lawrence Schimel
- Misterio En El Jardin (English: Mystery in the Garden) (Kalandraka) written by Lawrence Schimel
- La Golondrina Peregrina (Aldeasa) written by Lawrence Schimel
- Amigos Y Vecinos (English: Friends and Neighbours) (La Librería) written by Lawrence Schimel
- ¿Lees Un Cuento Conmigo? (English: Will You Read a Story With Me?) (Panamericana written by Lawrence Schimel
- Cuentos Magicos De Brujas (English: Magical Tales of Witches) (Timun Más) written by Carmen Gil
- The Free And The Brave: A Collection Of Poems About The United States (Compass Point Books)
- Cobwebs, Chatters, And Chills: A Collection Of Scary Poems (Compass Point Books)
- Recess, Rhymes, And Reason: A Collection Of Poems About School (Compass Point Books)
- Fur, Fangs, And Footprints: A Collection Of Poems About Animals (Compass Point Books)
- The Wolf In Sheep'S Clothing (Picture Window Books)
- The Tortoise And The Hare (Picture Window Books)
- The Lion And The Mouse (Picture Window Books)
- The Ant And The Grasshopper (Picture Window Books)
- The Fox And The Grapes (Picture Window Books)
- The Goose That Laid The Golden Egg (Picture Window Books)
