= Pierre Le Guennec =

Pierre Le Guennec (born 1939) is a retired French electrician who announced, in 2010, that he was in possession of 271 undocumented, never before seen works by Pablo Picasso that were estimated to be worth at least 60 million euros (about US$80 million).

Le Guennec, who had worked for Picasso installing burglar alarms in the early 1970s, said that the artist's second wife Jacqueline Roque had given him a trunk full of artworks as a gift, about 40 years ago. He contacted Picasso's son and heirs in September 2010 to have the works authenticated; the administrators of Picasso's estate found the works to be authentic and filed a lawsuit alleging they were received illegally. Police questioned Le Guennec and confiscated the works. He has not been charged with a crime but a judge will rule whether he can get the artworks back.

The works date from 1900 to 1932 and "include lithographs, portraits, watercolors and sketches -- plus nine Cubist collages." "Among them are a richly colored hand study; a sketch of his first wife, Russian ballerina Olga Khokhlova, resting an elbow in a seated pose; and a collage of a pipe and bottle."

Geneviève Laporte described acts of extraordinary generosity by her former lover Picasso. He is known to have given paintings and sketches to his chauffeur, favorite doctors, merchants and his barber. Picasso's heirs claimed that the artist would not have given that many works to a workman not known to be among his friends, and that, further, he always dedicated, dated and signed his gifts. Pepita Dupont, who wrote a book about Jacqueline Roque, called her "generosity itself".

Maurice Bresnu, Picasso's driver and friend, also had a large collection of works by Picasso and was accused of theft by Picasso's heirs. Bresnu's niece claimed that he had openly admitted the theft to her. He also said that he had gotten Pierre Le Guennec, a first cousin of Bresnu's wife, into Picasso's house.

In 2015 Pierre Le Guennec was found guilty by a French court of possessing stolen works by Picasso. On the March 1st 2018 the Court of Cassation invalidated the judgment.
