= Joaquín Luque Roselló =

Spanish painter

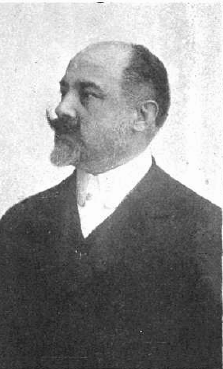
- Luque ~1913
- Born: September 27, 1865; Málaga, Spain
- Died: January 23, 1932 (aged 66); Buenos Aires, Argentina
- Known for: Painting

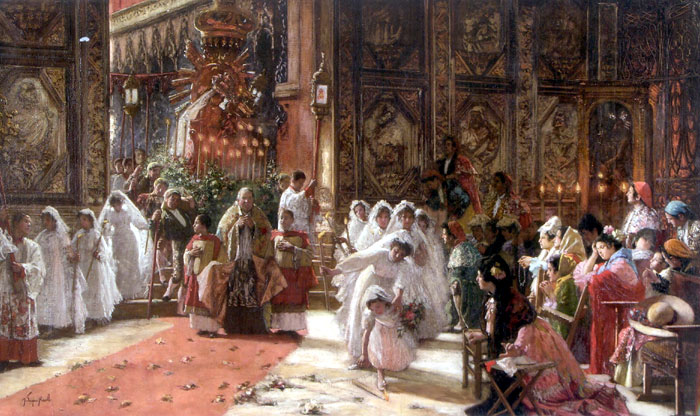
An example of Joaquín Luque Roselló's work

Joaquín Luque Roselló (September 27, 1865 - January 23, 1932) was a Spanish painter. Famous works of art of his include Galanteo en el salón, La Boda, and Vistiendo al maestro, 1882, which were all recently sold at auction.
