= Joan Ramos =

Spanish painter

Joan Ramos Monllor (born 28 March 1942) is a Spanish cartoonist, painter, engraver, sculptor and illustrator. He lives in Xàtiva (Spain) and he is characterized for an expressionist language.

== Biography ==
Joan Ramos was born in Valencia 1942. Your participation in exhibitions and competitions took him in 1971 to be awarded a scholarship in Paris by the French government, where he acquired extensive training as a draftsman. He illustrated the Goncourt prizes (France) and the Blasco Ibáñez prizes (Spain).

== Work ==
Influenced among others by Modigliani, Picasso, Gauguin, Joan Ramos develops a work which highlights the envelope of expressive power to the language of the limbs in his drawings, showing a lively formal art that through these deformations. It is also typically use the oil to run lines giving gifted density forms a kind of shape and a characteristic color relief. His paintings are a reflection of their concern, their emotions, because the different jobs or series that has developed has been due to the various investigations that have led to the development from works inspired by classical iconography, African culture or historical urban cities, to portraits of relevant characters. Ramos has received numerous awards and recognitions some internationals and other nationals from the 70s to the present.
