= Diego Lara =

Spanish painter

- Born: Madrid
- Died: 1990 (aged 43–44)
- Occupations: Graphic designer and painter

Diego Lara (1946–1990) was a Spanish painter and graphic designer.

Lara was born in Madrid in 1946. He attended painting workshops during the 1960s, exhibiting in various group shows by young painters. He commenced a history course at university, in the department of Philosophy and Letters, but left before completing it. He then began to work on graphic design projects, designing book covers for publishers including Siglo XXI, Seix Barral, Fundaments, Turner, and Trece de Nieve.

In 1972 he founded and became graphic design director for the publishing company La Fontana Literaria, co-founded with Mauricio d’Ors. The following year he and d'Ors, together with Juan Antonio Molina Foix, founded another publisher, Nostromo. There, he developed a radically new and personal editorial image. Between 1974 and 1982 he was responsible for the graphic design of publications by the Juan March Foundation in Madrid, where he renewed the graphic and editorial concept of the “exhibition catalog.” Between 1979 and 1981 he co-directed Poesía magazine with Gonzalo Armero. Published by the Ministry of Culture, it became a landmark in the field of cultural publications. Between 1982 and 1986 he created the graphic image for publications by the ARCO art fair, while serving as artistic director and graphic designer for the art magazine Buades. Around the same time he began a fruitful collaboration with the publishers Ediciones el Viso, designing catalogs for many of the leading exhibitions of that decade. Other projects from that period include designing the graphic image and publications for the Spanish Pavilion at the International Fair in Brisbane, Australia; designing book collections for the publishers Editorial Cátedra and Editora Nacional; designing commercial frames, and designing painting catalogs, among other projects. In 1986 he received the Graphic Design Prize from the City Government of Madrid, and in 1988 he made the poster for the Laus Prizes.

Besides his professional work as a graphic designer, Lara continued throughout his life to paint. Most of his work was kept privately, but he participated in a few group shows: at Fenicia Gallery, Almuñecar, in 1979; in the “Dibujos” exhibition at Buades Gallery, Madrid, in 1984; and in "Cota Cero", Alicante and Madrid, in 1985. Following his death in 1990 his work was the subject of an anthological exhibition (La Caixa, Madrid, 1990). It featured too in exhibitions at Madrid's Buades Gallery in 1992 and in Torre de los Guzmanes, La Algaba, Seville in 1994.
