= Josefa Ruiz Blasco =

Josefa Ruiz Blasco (Málaga 1825-1901) was the aunt of Pablo Picasso and the eldest of the eleven brothers and sisters of the Ruiz Blasco family. he lived with her sister and brother Matilde and José (Picasso’s father) in the Plaça de la Merced of Málaga until he got married and then she went to live with her youngest brother Salvador.

Josefa Ruiz was a spinster, known for her strong character, her bad moods and extreme religiosity. She had a paralysed leg. At her brother’s Salvador home she lived in a separate wing of the house, rarely going out, and her room was full of saints, religious relics and memories of her deceased brother Pablo Ruiz Blasco. Picasso received “Pablo” as a first name in memory of this uncle, who died two years before he was born.

Pablo Picasso spent some summer stays in Málaga with his family and during the summer of 1896, when he was 15 years old, by request of his uncle Salvador, he painted a portrait in oil of Josefa Ruiz, considered to be one of the outstanding portraits by the young Picasso. In Portrait of Aunt Pepa the artist played with the light on the face and the chromatic treatment, achieving in this way to go deep into the psychological profile of his aunt.

The death of Josefa Ruiz coincided with the days of the last visit of Picasso to Málaga, in 1901.

== Bibliography ==
- Daix, Pierre (2012). Le nouveau dictionaire Picasso. Paris: Robert Laffont. p. 798.
- Inglada, Rafael (2005). Diccionario Málaga-Picasso Picasso-Málaga. Màlaga: Arguval. p. 118.
- Richardson, John (1995). Una biografía. Vol 1: 1881-190. Madrid: Alianza Editorial. p. 58.
