= Agustin Gasull =

Agustin Gasull was a historical painter of Valencia.

Gasull studied at Rome under Carlo Maratti. His St. Andrew, St. Stephen, La Vierge de I'Espérance, and St. Joseph, which he painted for the church of San Juan del Mercado at Valencia, are admired. There are many pictures by him in other churches of the same city. He died at Valencia at the commencement of the 18th century.
