= Francisco de Amberes =

Spanish painter

Francisco de Amberes was a Spanish painter from Toledo, the cathedral of which he ornamented with his pictures in 1502. From 1508 to 1510 he painted, in conjunction with Juan de Borgoña and Juan de Villoldo, the arabesque chapel.
