= Juan Varela =

Spanish painter (born 1950)

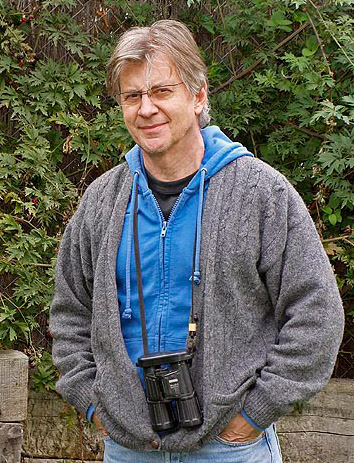
Juan Varela, biologist and artist in his former studio in Madrid nearby mountains

Juan Varela (born 1950, Madrid, Spain) is a biologist and Wildlife Artist. Born in Madrid where he studied Biology and earned a master's degree with his studies on seabird behavior. Until 1980 he worked on seabird research in gull colonies off the African north coast. At the same time, he did scientific illustration for nature magazines and encyclopedias. He was the main illustrator of the Spanish well known nature film maker and writer Felix Rodriguez de la Fuente.

In 1986, Varela was appointed as Director of the Spanish Ornithological Society a post that he occupied until 1990 when he started to dedicate more time to art, eventually making of this a full-time job. He was the co-founder of the Mediterranean seabird association that for many years contributed to the conservation of biodiversity of the Mediterranean basin. As an active Council member, he participated in the organization of international symposium and congress in Spain, Italy, and Tunisia.

In 1992, he started to cooperate with the Artist for Nature Foundation, a Dutch-based group involved in nature conservation through art, participating in several projects in different countries (i.e. Peru, Ecuador, Spain, Alaska, Portugal, Israel, etc.). He is the official representative of ANF in Spain.

He has published 20 books. Amongst them, two identification field guides on birds and mammals and a students' manual on nature drawing. His paintings have been exhibited in galleries and museums of UK, the Netherlands, France, Spain, Portugal and USA, and his work was selected by the jury of the Birds in Art show at the Leigh Yawkey Woodson Art Museum, (Wausau, Wisconsin) that holds some of his paintings in its permanent collection. Varela is considered one of the founders of the modern Wildlife Art in Spain and he has contributed to its development with his teaching. A great part of his paintings are produced on site, through direct observation of animals in their environment, but the studio work is also based on field sketches.

== Publications ==
- 1980 - Todavía Vivo (Penthalon)
- 1982 - Las Especies de Caza (INCAFO)
- 1996 - El Calendario de la Vida (Espasa-Calpe)
- 1996 - Naturaleza Amenazada. 3 Vol. (SEO/BirdLife-Banco Central Hispano)
- 1997 - Dibujar la Naturaleza (Ed. Serbal)
- 1998 - Les Terres de Baliar (Sa Nostra)
- 1998 - Los Paisajes del Tiempo (Tribuna)
- 1998 - Los Paisajes de la Vida Colección de 12 CDs. (Tribuna.)
- 2000 - Guía de las Aves de España (Lynx Ed.)
- 2002 - Guía de los Mamíferos de España (Lynx Ed.)
- 2004 - Arte del Aire (Lynx Ed.)
- 2006 - Hace Millones de Años / Animales SL. (Círculo Digital)
- 2006 - La Era de los Dinosaurios / Animales SL. (Círculo Digital)
- 2006 - Microcosmos / Animales SL. (Círculo Digital)
- 2006 - Enredados / Animales SL. (Círculo Digital)
- 2006 - Extraños en el Mar / Animales SL (Círculo Digital)
- 2007 - Aves Amenazadas de España (Lynx)
- 2010 - Entre Mar y Tierra / Between sea and land (Lynx)
- 2011 - "Las Aves en el Museo del Prado" (SEO/BirdLife)
- 2012 - El Calendario de la Vida (Tundra Ed.)
- 2015 - Dibujo de Aves (Parramon Ed.)
