= Aurelio Suárez =

Spanish artist (1910–2003)

Aurelio Suárez (14 January 1910 Gijón – 10 April 2003 Gijón) was a Spanish painter. He developed an extensive body of work using various styles of painting.

== Biography ==
Suárez was born in Gijón, where he held his first exhibition when he was 19 years old at the Escuela Superior de Comercio. He mixed his surrealistic imagination with images of his life: the city, people and self-portraits. He also worked for magazines drawing comics strips or even designing for dishes and ceramics. In 1934, he had an exhibition in the Modern Art Museum of Madrid (currently Museo Reina Sofía).
