= Juan Galván Jiménez =

Spanish painter (1596–1658)

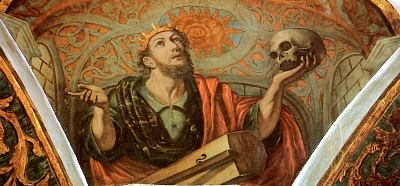
David, detail of a fresco by Galván, ca 1628, in the Monasterio de la Concepción in Épila

Juan Galván (or Galbán) Jiménez (19 November 1596 – 1658), a Spanish painter, was born at Luesia, in the kingdom of Aragon. According to Palomino, he went to Rome for improvement, where he remained some time, and on his return to Spain in 1624 resided chiefly at Zaragoza, where he was named painter by the Corporation, and executed various pictures for the cathedral and Carmelite convent. For the cathedral of Zaragoza he executed pictures of the Nativity, Santa Justa, and Santa Rufina, as well as other large works, which Cean Bermudez praises for their colouring. He painted the cupola of Santa Justa y Rufina, and a picture of the Trinity for the Barefooted Carmelites; but his principal work was the Birth of the Virgin. He died at Zaragoza.
