= Joaquín Bárbara y Balza =

Spanish artist

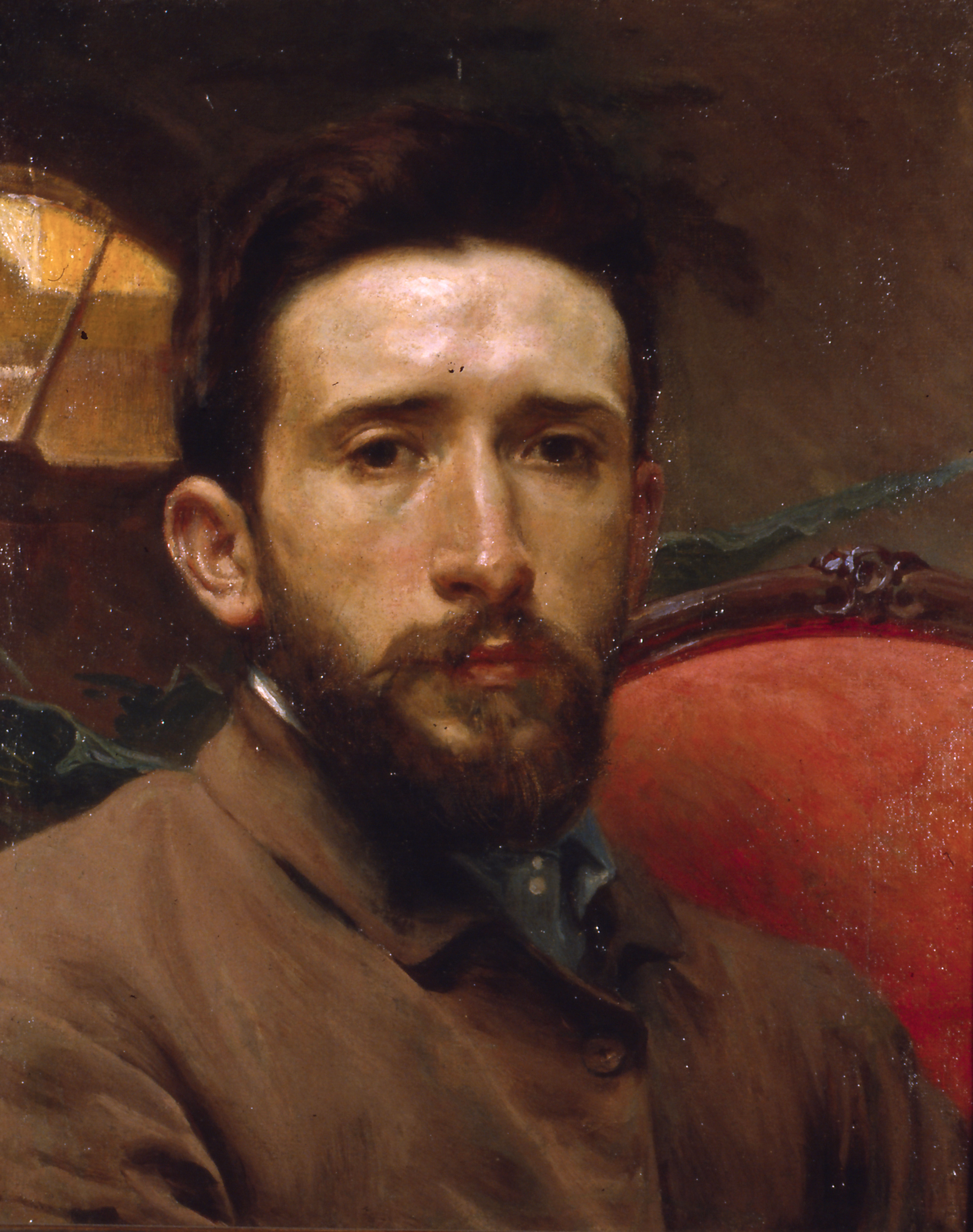
- Born: Joaquín de Bárbara y Balza; 18 December 1867; Llodio, Spain
- Died: 10 September 1931 (aged 63); Santander, Spain
- Education: Real Academia de Bellas Artes de San Fernando
- Known for: Painting, drawing
- Movement: Academicism

Joaquín Bárbara y Balza (1867–1931) was a Spanish painter. He was born in Llodio, Álava, and died in Santander, Cantabria.

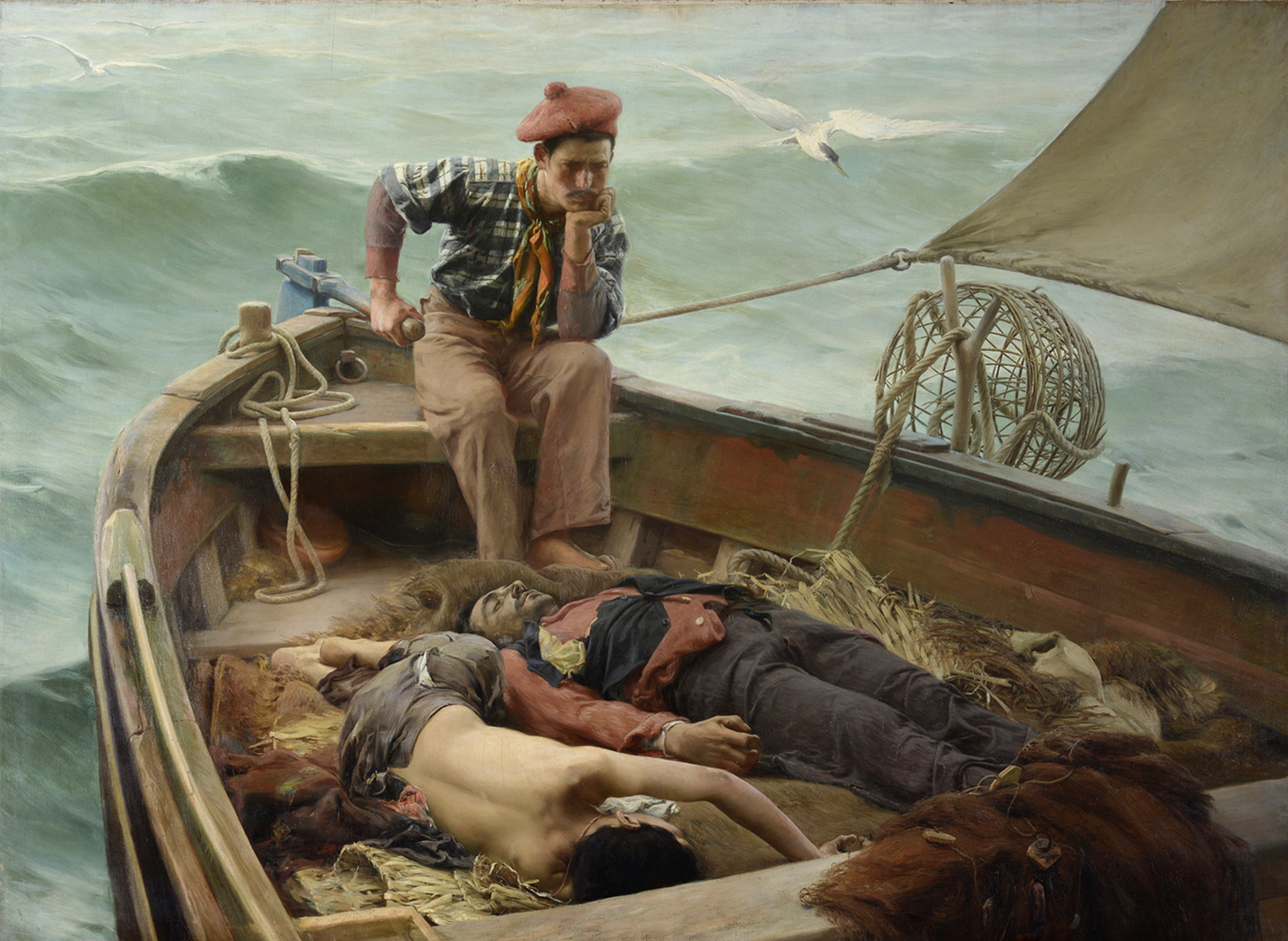
shipwrecked. Joaquín Bárbara y Balza, 1896.

== Bibliografia ==
- Bernaola Luxa, Egoitz (2017). «Joaquín Bárbara y Balza, pintor entre dos siglos. Paisajes, figuras, luces y sombras de un artista olvidado 1867-1931». Vitoria-Gasteiz: Cofradía de Sant Roque de Laudio/Llodio, Fundación Alday, Fundación Vital, Ayuntamiento de Laudio/Llodio y Diputación Foral de Álava. ISBN 978-84-697-7428-1
- García Díez, José Antonio (1990). "La Pintura en Álava". Vitoria: Fundación Caja Vital Kutxa. ISBN 84-505-9672-6.
- Moreno Ruiz de Eguino & Pita Andrade, Iñaki; José Manuel (1995). «Basque artists in Rome (1865–1915)». Fundación Social y Cultural Kutxa. ISBN 8471732661.
