= Virgilio Ruiz Fernández =

Virgilio Ruiz Fernández (born in Madrid, Spain, 1930) is a Spanish-Mexican painter, representative of the neo-realist and neo-naturalist schools of painting in Mexico. His work is strongly influenced by the Spanish and Flemish Renaissance and baroque European traditions (15th-17th centuries) and the Mexican Expressionism (first half of 20th century). He is a supporter of the recovery of painting techniques from these periods and their learning and development in modern art in Mexico.

The work of Virgilio Ruiz encompasses different thematic and technical periods, from portraits, landscapes (specially of Central Mexico high plateau and surroundings sceneries and Mexican coastlines) and allegorical, mythological and biblical themes and personages, using specially the tempera and oil techniques on canvas and wood in small and big formats. The approach of indirect painting and glaze techniques are extensively used to highlight the luminous content, deepness of planes and volume of the represented objects and figures, on one hand, and the emotional and expressive aspects of the characters and contexts thus depicted.

The development of the oeuvre of Virgilio Ruiz Fernández has as common thrust the recovery of art as a spiritual activity aimed at representing and expressing nature and human life on the basis of the technical achievements of the classical painting, mainly in Europe (between the Renaissance and Romantic periods) and making the most of them for aesthetical purposes and subjective expression, as opposed to other “mechanical” representative techniques such as the photography.

== Biography ==
Virgilio Ruiz Fernández was born in Madrid and emigrated from Spain together with his family after the Spanish Civil War broke out in 1936. The family settled down in Mexico City in 1941, where Ruiz Fernández attended university and developed his studies of painting and drawing techniques. The influence of exiled Spanish intellectuals and artists during the 1950s proved to be essential for his career, especially on the evocative aspect of it. He established further contact with representatives of the Mexican historicist schools of La Esmeralda and the Academy of San Carlos in Mexico City. In 1975 he opened his own academy, where students and professional painters alike learnt and refined their pictorial skills and techniques, especially tempera and oil. He lives in Mexico City.
