= Arthur Sachs =

Spanish painter

"Viking", an oil painting painted by Arthur Sachs

Arthur Sachs (1953 - 2007) was a Swedish-Spanish neo-impressionist painter.

Arthur Sachs was born in Sweden in 1953. He lived the first half of his live in Sweden. After 30 years he moved to Spain and lived there until his death. The artist is known for large series of paintings of Swedish divas and Spanish flamenco dancers.

Arthur Sachs died in Spain in 2007 at the age of 54.

== Art technique ==
A distinctive feature of the artist is that he captures exactly the body positions of the dancers as well as complex dance movements. His most famous painting from this series is “Flamenco Dancer”. In this painting Arthur Sachs accurately reproduces the hand position, curvature of the spine and head turning characteristic of this dance.

The color scheme of his paintings while living in Sweden was cold, as a reflection of the northern lights. After moving to Spain his palette becomes much warmer and the paintings become saturated with color.
