= Mariana de la Cueva Benavides y Barradas =

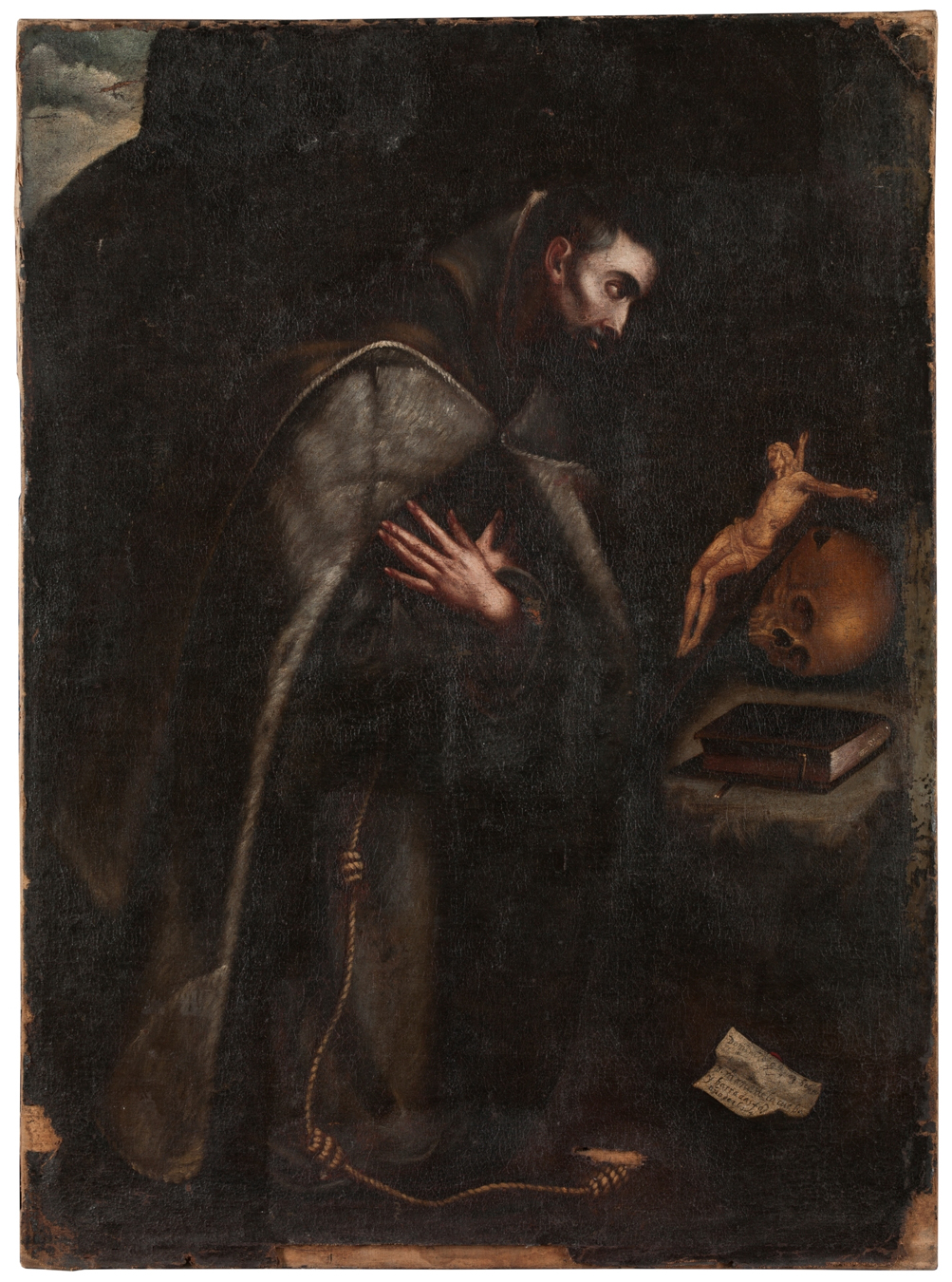
San Francisco de Asís kneeling in meditation, oil on canvas, 137 x 101 cm, Madrid, Museo del Prado

Mariana de la Cueva Benavides y Barradas (Guadix, 1623- Granada, 1688) was a Spanish painter born into a wealthy family in Granada. Her father, Pedro de la Cueva Benavides, was a councilman for the municipal government, and her mother, Juana María de Barradas, was descended from a noble family, as the daughter of the lord of Cortes y Graena. In 1635, Pedro de la Cueva died of poisoning, and his widow and daughters took refuge in the monastery of Santiago, run by Poor Clare nuns. Mariana lived there for several years until her marriage to Pedro de Ostos y Zayas, a knight of the Order of Calatrava from Granada.

By 1662, she was already a widow, which probably allowed her greater freedom to practice the art of painting in her palace on the Cuesta de Santa Inés, now known as the Palacio de los Olvidados. She died on September 6, 1688, and was buried in the parish church of San Gil, a few meters from the Hospital de la Caridad y Refugio.

Few of her works have been identified. Among others, several paintings from 1672 for the Hospital de la Caridad y Refugio in Granada are known.

In 2018, thanks to the legacy of Carmen Sánchez García, the Prado Museum acquired a canvas depicting St. Francis of Assisi kneeling in meditation, signed and dated on a piece of paper at the foot of the saint "D. maria(na) de la cueba / y barradas fac / año de 16?4."
