= Miguel Manrique =

Flemish painter active in Spain

Miguel Manrique, or Amberes, or El Flamengo (1604 – 1647), was a Baroque painter from the Southern Netherlands active in Spain. He was born in Flanders, and learned his art there under Rubens, and afterwards, at Genoa, from Giovanni Andrea de' Ferrari, and Cornells Wael. He subsequently obtained a commission as captain of a troop in the Spanish service, and went to Spain and settled in Málaga, where are several works by him in the churches and elsewhere. His portraits are executed in a style similar to that of Van Dijck. Miguel de Amberes died in Spain in the latter half of the 17th century.
