= Felipe Checa =

Spanish painter

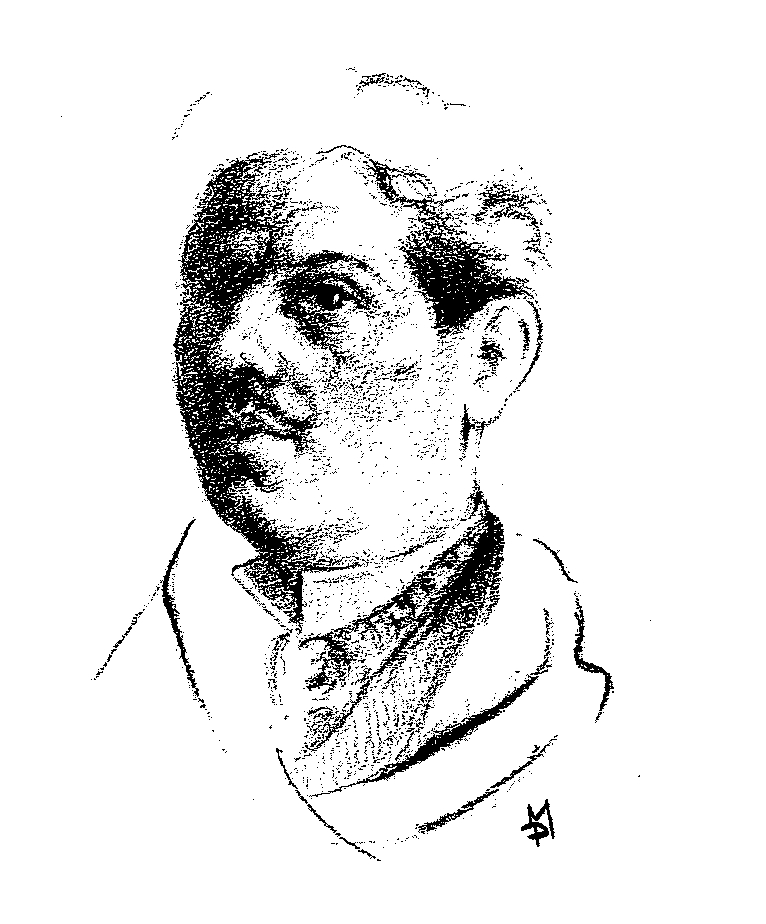
Felipe Checa Portrait

Felipe Checa was a Spanish painter active in Badajoz during the nineteenth-century.
