= Xavier Navarro de Torres =

Spanish painter and sculptor

- Born: Javier Navarro de Torres; 28 November 1956 (age 69); Barcelona, Spain
- Resting place: Almeria, Spain
- Known for: Painting, Drawing, Sculpture

Xavier Navarro de Torres (born 28 November 1956) is a Spanish painter and sculptor.

He was born in Barcelona, Catalonia, Spain, in 1956.

== Expositions ==
- 1976 Art. Expres Gallery, Girona, Spain
- 1979 La Caixa de Sitges, Barcelona, Spain
- 1980 Catalán Institut Ibero-american, Coop, Barcelona, Spain
- 1981 C. Tau Installation "Dream of Desert", Almeria, Spain
- 1982 Keller Club, Biel, Switzerland
- 1985 Estar Gris Gallery, Almería, Spain
- 1986 Münchenstein, Performance, Basel, Switzerland
- 1987 Galería Argar, "Paintings and Sculptures", Almeria, Spain
- 1988 Sala la Rectoría (s. XVI), "Ten Years Anthology", Barcelona, Spain
- 1989 Udo Walz Saloons, Berlin, Germany
- 1990 Galerie d' Art Imagine, Montreal, Canada
- 1991 Jomfruburet Gallery, Oslo, Norway
- 1992 Can Mercader Park, Barcelona, Spain
- 1997 Campari Bar (Art '97), Basel, Switzerland

== Expositions in collaboration ==
- 1975 Galery Aixo. Pluc (with Ferrán Maese, sculptor), Barcelona, Spain
- 1979 Can Mercader School (with J. Minguet, poet/writer]), Barcelona, Spain
- 1983 Keller Club (with Ana María Godat, painter), Biel, Switzerland
- 1983 New Acropolis, Arabian Palace of Abrantes (s. XI) (with Ana M. Godat), Granada, Spain
- 1984 Alte Krone (with Ana M. Godat), Biel, Switzerland

== Group exhibitions ==
- 1983 S.P. Société d'Art Suisse, Biel, Switzerland
- 1984 Works from Nicaragua (S.P.S.A.S.), Biel, Switzerland
- 1986 Bienal of Basilea 17.85, Bâle, Switzerland
- 1989 Montserrat Gallery, New York City, United States
- 1990 Galerie d'Art Imagine, Montreal, Canadá
- 1990 Montserrat Gallery, New York City
- 1993 Works to UNICEF, Almeria, Spain

== Permanent collections ==
- The Archaeological Museum "Luis Siret" of Almeria, Spain
- La Caixa de Barcelona, Spain
- Mister F. Pérez Rodríguez, Almeria
- St. Ramon Castle Rodalquilar Sculptures, Almeria, Spain
- Mister F. Perez Rguez., Almeria, Spain
- Mister Jack Wait, Berlin/Miami
- Cartier, California
- Savit's Center (New York)
- 1994 Suristán Spaces, Madrid, Spain. Stone-Wood Permanent Installation.
- 1995 Artist in Residence N.Y., New York (USA).
- 1996 St-Jaume Church (Barcelona), Spain. Can Mercader Park. Triptic-Painting (Permanent Mural Installation).

== Selected works ==
- Los Músicos, oil painting, 1995–1996, 160 × 170 cm
- Iberia, oil, 1995–1996, 105 × 130 cm
- Tapiz azul, oil, 1996, 105 × 130 cm
- Vidriera, oil, 1996, 105 × 130 cm
- Tapiz rojo, oil, 1996, 105 × 130 cm
- Talla de madera, oil, 1995, 105 × 130 cm
- Aliga, stone, 17 kg, 40 × 20 × 20 cm
- Busto, stone, 8 kg, 70 × 25 × 25 cm
- Indios, wood-iron, 30 kg, 100 × 25 × 25 cm
- Virgen, stone, 100 kg, 100 × 40 × 25 cm
- Sin título, oil, 1996, 105 × 135 cm
- Azul, azules, oil, 1996, 160 × 170 cm
- La Gente que viene del sol, oil, 1996, 160 × 170 cm
- La Gente que viene del mar, 1995, oil, 1995–1996, 160 × 170 cm
- Hermético de Otoño, oil, 1995–1996, 160 × 170 cm
- La virgen de Piedra, oil, 1996, 105 × 130 cm
- África, oil, 1992, 105 × 135 cm

== Bibliography ==
- MARÍN FERNÁNDEZ, Bartolomé. "Charidemos o diálogos de la mar", p. 206. Monte de Piedad y Caja de Ahorros de Almería, Almeria, Spain, 15 August 1990 ISBN 84-505-9586-X.
- HOF, Peter. "Xavier de Torres 1997". Basel, Switzerland, May 1997.
- Torres, Xavier de. Pintura 1. Ed. Magda Disseny, S.L., D.L. GI-34-2011, ISBN 978-84-614-6851-5.
