= Eulàlia Ferrer Ribot =

Eulàlia Ferrer Ribot (1776-1850) was a Spanish printer.

She was the daughter of Rafael Ferrer Costa and Maria Ribot, married in 1799 to Antoni Brusi Mirabent (d. 1821), and mother of Antoni Brusi Ferrer. She and her spouse were both registered as printers and publishers in cooperation. During the Peninsular War, they published the loyalist papers Gazeta militar y política del Principado de Catalunya and Diario de Barcelona. Because of this, they were given the privilege and monopoly of lithography after the fall of Napoleon, which they introduced to the Spanish press in 1819. They provided the royal house with lithographs. She became sole director as widowed in 1821. In 1823, their monopoly was abolished, but Eulalia sued the state and managed to delay it until 1825. Her son succeeded her in 1838.
