= Manuel Carnicer Fajó =

Catalan painter

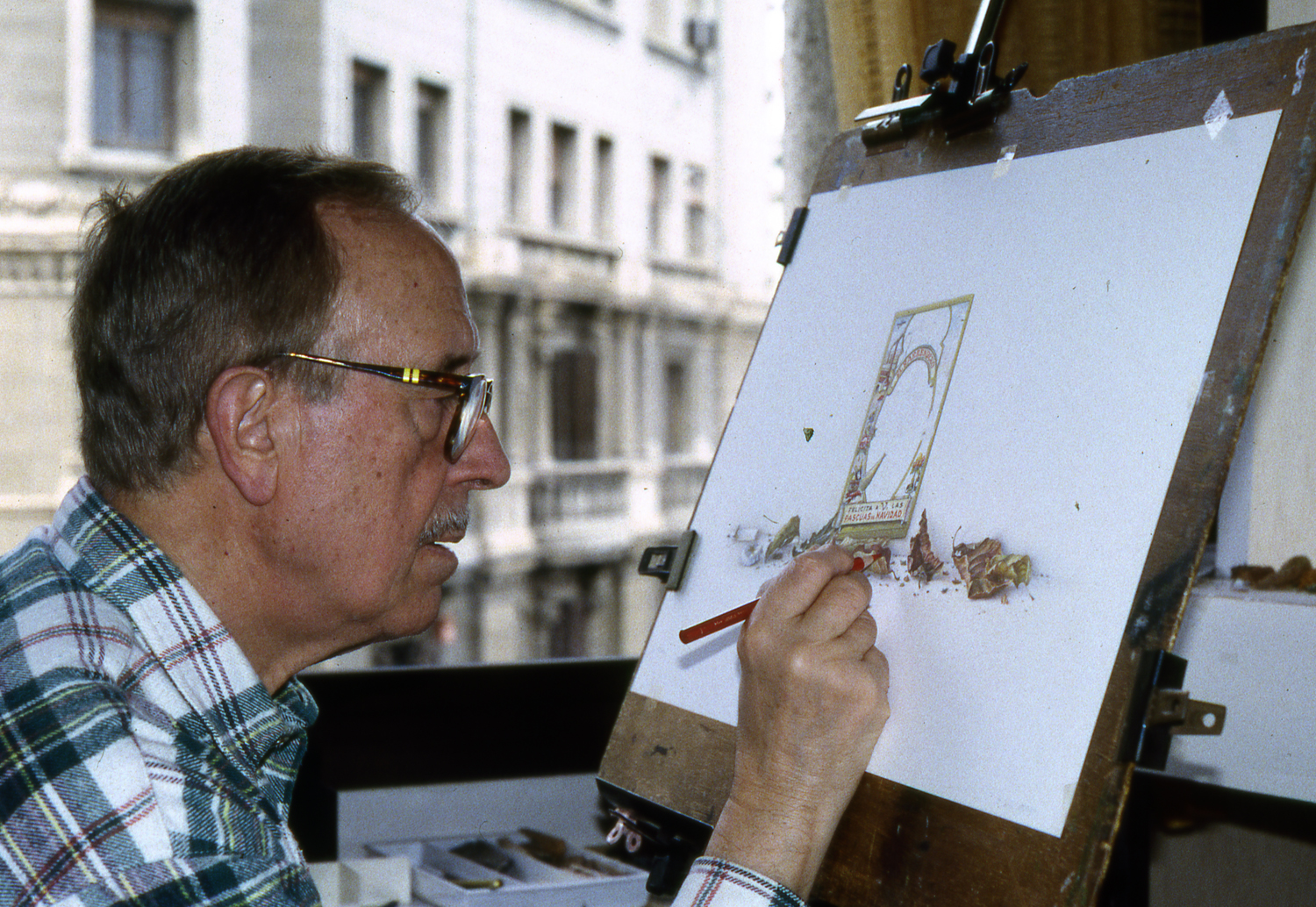
Manuel Carnicer working at his studio of Rambla de Catalunya, in Barcelona

Manuel Carnicer Fajó (22 April 1921, Mataro – 16 September 1998, Barcelona (Spain)) was a Catalan painter who, throughout his life, cultivated different kinds of painting (watercolor, etching, charcoal drawing, oil), but what happened to posterity by his hyper-realistic style, full of sensibility, made with watercolour crayons, being in this sense is unique in its genre.

== Biography ==
Born in Mataró is the younger brother of three, a humble family which moved in a short time in Barcelona, the first quarter of Hostafrancs, then the Old Town. At age 17, he participated in the Spanish Civil War. His age group were called "La Quinta del Biberón" ("The Fifth of the Bottle") because of the youth of the soldiers being sent to the front lines in the Pyrenees. There, he faced all sorts of calamities, his hands froze, and he contracted typhus. He was taken prisoner along with his companions by the army of Francisco Franco, being sent to a concentration camp located in the Plaza de Toros San Sebastian, there is a companion to the soldiers noticed the pitiful appearance of Manuel, who is sent to Center of Azpeitia, to recover, which happily succeeded.

After the war he returned to Barcelona, where she worked for the company Cros SA had entered the age of 14 as elevator Then, after studying at the School of Industrial and having obtained the title of Master of Industrial and draftsman draftsman, is promoted to the company as part of the technical office design as a draftsman. Between the years 1948-1953 was a member of the FAD (Promotion of Decorative Arts), today Promotion of Arts and Design, then located in the dome of the Coliseum on the Gran Via de les Corts Catalanes Barcelona, where he attended and participate regularly. From this period is the collection of portraits and drawings of natural, sanguine, gouache, pencil or charcoal. The artistic activity was developed over many years combining his work with Cros and commissions from various industrial graphic design.

The first 70 years meant a certain distance of artistic activity until the summer of 1977 creates a series of paintings inspired by the fields of Penedès, with the technique of crayons, which meant the beginning a new and final stage. His work is wonderful, elegant, very detail spoils the tone of the shadows, giving prominence to the white paper. Tireless worker, destrament using colored pencils, was a master in the difficult art of drawing. From this begin in 1977 until his death in 1998, using his home-studio Rambla de Catalunya, and wonderfully supported by his wife Gertrude Escolá, Manuel Carnicer has created a work sublime, very attractive and unique in its style proof of this has been its success in presentations made, both as critical and sellings.

== Exhibitions ==
Exhibitions in the Galería Mayte Munoz of Barcelona and Madrid in the years 1979, 1981, 1982, 1984, 1986, 1991 and 1994. Posthumous exhibition in 1999 in the same gallery, presented by Francesc Garriga . Special exhibition on the occasion of the 8th Congress of Maintenance at the Palau de la Musica in Barcelona. Collective exhibitions: 15 Years of Mayte Munoz, The subject of Paseo de Gracia. 1992 Olympic Games. Interarte of Valencia in 1985.

Soko Gallery, May 1995. Art Expo, May 2000. Drawing Fair on Bulevard dels Antiquaris. Retrospective in 2001 at Caja Madrid Plaza de Catalunya, Barcelona. Collective Exhibition Spanish painter and sculptor. Encuentros con el Arte Actual, 13 November 2008 to 23 January 2009. Municipal Museum of Contemporary Art (Palacio del Conde Duque, Madrid). Works by Manuel Carnicer in several Spanish cities, France, Holland, Museum of Palamós, Francesc Galí and Legacy Perfume Museum, as well as many private collectors. A collection of works dated between 1948 and 1953 at Museo del Dibujo, in Castillo de Larrés, Huesca (Spain) From 2011-11-11 to 2012-1-8 Choral Exhibition with Encuentros con el Arte Actual Palau Miramar Sitges Donation of drawings to the Museum of Mataro in 2010, February 1, 2012 to May 12, 2012, organized by Amics dels Museus de Catalunya and the City Council of Mataro

== Some Sources ==
- Interview with Radio 4, by Luis Pruneda
- Comments on Catalunya Radio by Francesc Galí and Lina Font on YouTube.
- Comments on TV3 (televisió de Catalunya)program to program " Avisan's quan arrivi el 2000 "presented by Francesc Garriga, coinciding with the exhibition of his latest works done in 1999.
- Books: Artistas de Mayte Munoz by Fernando Gutierrez. (includes Manuel Carnicer) Dictionary Rafols 1985-Vol I A - E p. .. 294. (Meeting with current art volumes II, III, IV, V and VI)
- La Vanguardia,15-12-1979 http://hemeroteca-paginas.lavanguardia.es/LVE08/HEM/1979/12/15/LVG19791215-029.pdf
- La Vanguardia 12-12-1981 http://hemeroteca-paginas.lavanguardia.es/LVE08/HEM/1981/12/12/LVG19811212-033.pdf
- ABC 6-3-1986 http://hemeroteca.abc.es/nav/Navigate.exe/hemeroteca/madrid/abc/1986/03/06/114.html
