= Luis Ortiz Rosales =

Spanish illustrator, draughtsman, painter, and graphic artist (died 1937)

Luis Ortiz Rosales (died 1937) was a Spanish illustrator, draughtsman, painter, and graphic artist. Born in the Canary Islands, he created numerous posters and drawings that earned him national fame. He created the drawings for Luis Buñuel's surrealist film L'Âge d'Or (1930).

After the outbreak of the Spanish Civil War, although a Falangist, he was imprisoned and then shot at a Nationalist concentration camp in 1937. The overcrowded prison had been a former Fyffes warehouse where bananas had been stored.
