= Antonio de Lanchares =

Spanish painter

Antonio de Lanchares (1586/1590 – 1630/1640) was a Spanish painter, active during the Baroque period, mainly in Madrid and surrounding towns.

He came from a family of painters and jewellers, and was a pupil of Eugenio Cajés. He painted a Jesus in Glory for the Jesuit church. Among his few surviving works is an Ascension of Christ. With Luis Fernandez in 1625, he painted a life of St Peter Nolasco for the convent of the Carmelitas de la Mercedes. In 1627, he was nominated to the post of painter to the king by Vincente Carducho, Eugenio Cajes, and Diego Velázquez, but did not fill the post.
