= Miguel Danus =

Spanish painter

Miguel Danus (fl. 1690) was a Spanish painter. He was disciple of Carlo Maratta in Italy, whose style he closely followed.
