= Joseba Eskubi =

Spanish artist

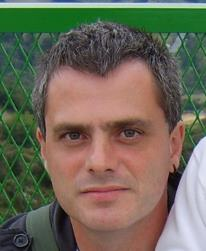
Joseba Eskubi

Joseba Eskubi (born 1967) is a Spanish artist who lives and works in Bilbao, Spain. He works with soft, amorphic and organic forms with images of decay, and his paintings incorporate surrealism. His work is often a single organic figure, and his works are created with mixed media (oil painting, acrylic, plasticine, photography).

== Gallery ==
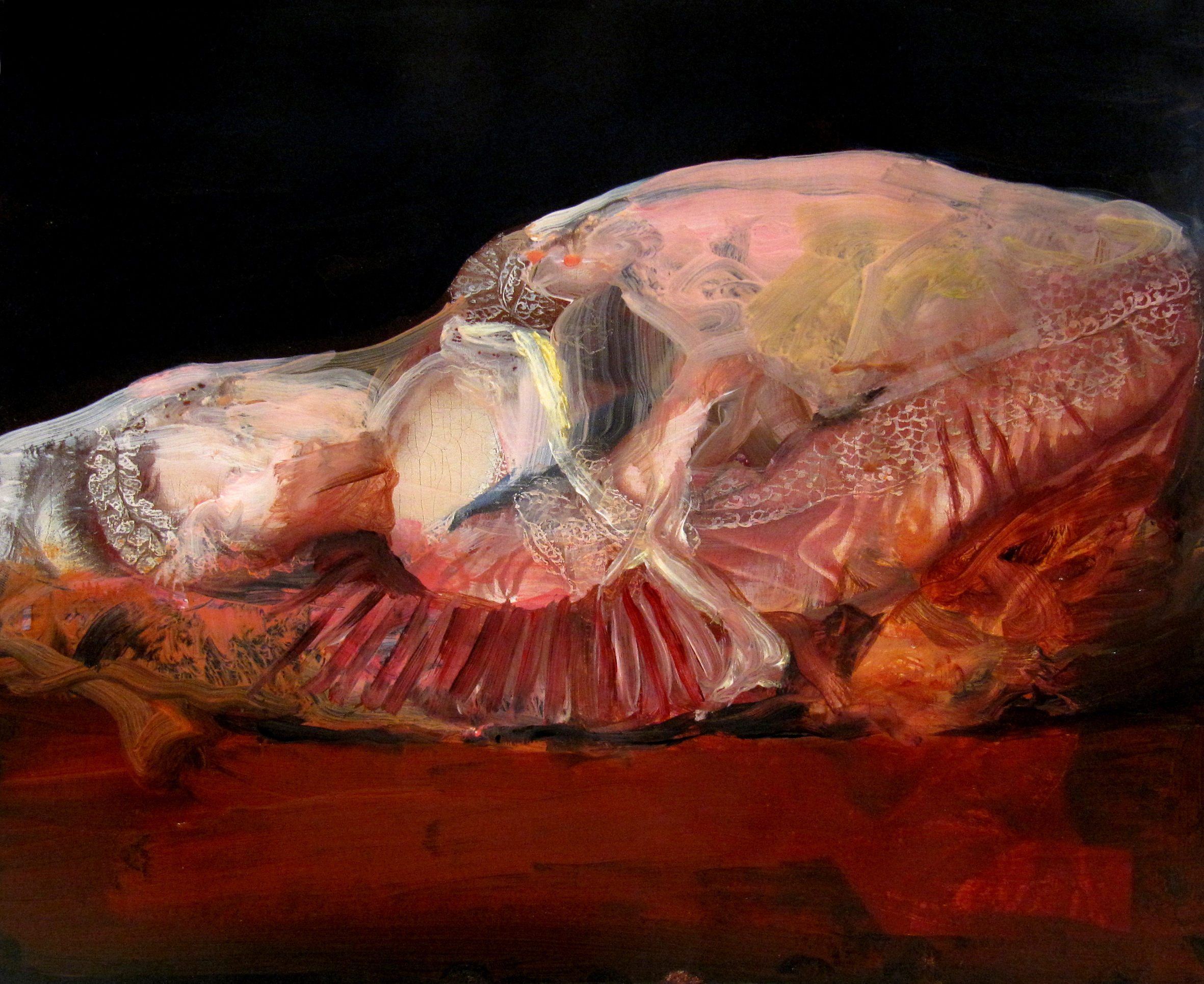
“INSOMNIA” mixed media by Spanish psinter Joseba Eskubi 2012

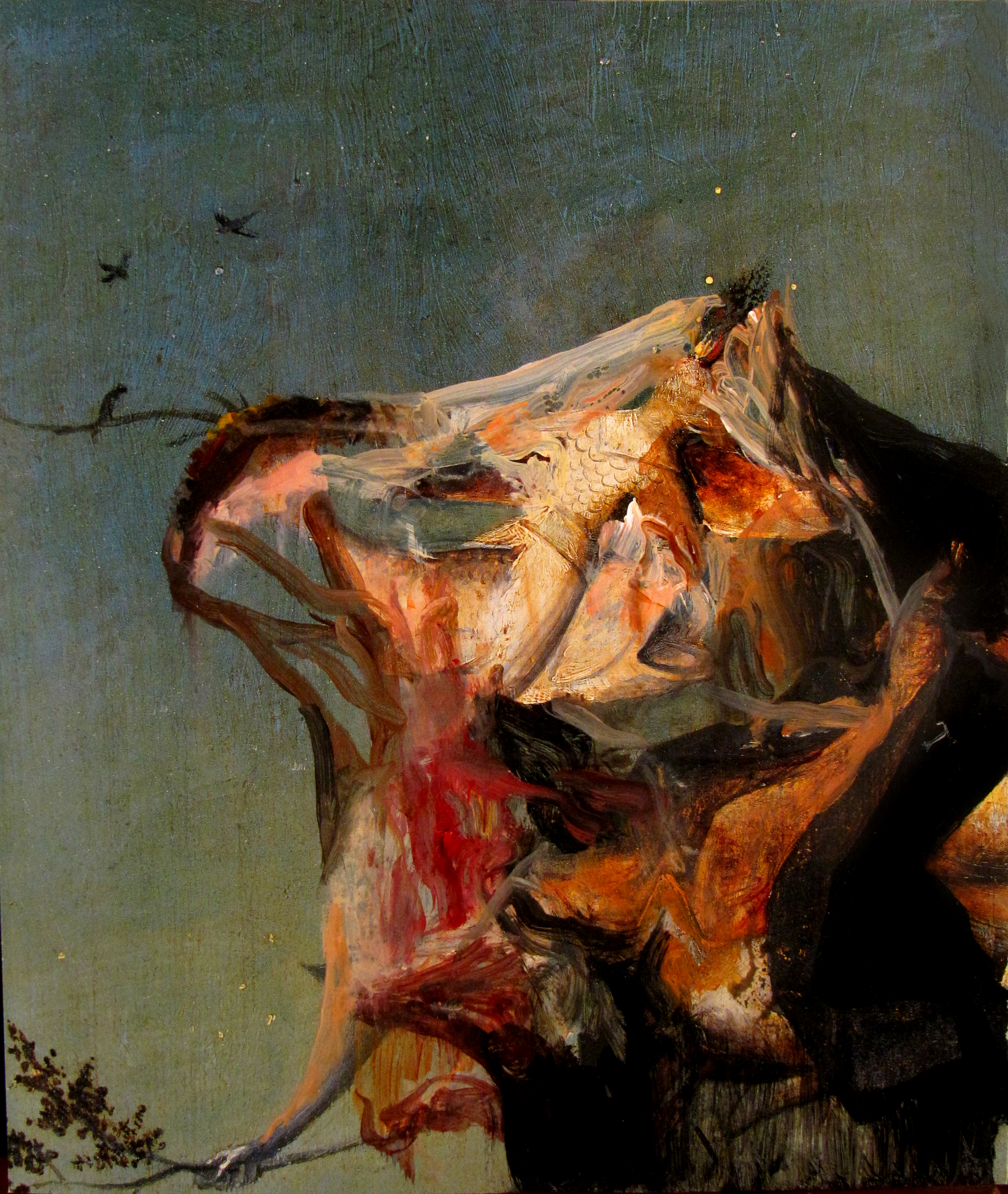
“INSOMNIA” mixed media by Spanish painter Joseba Eskubi 2012

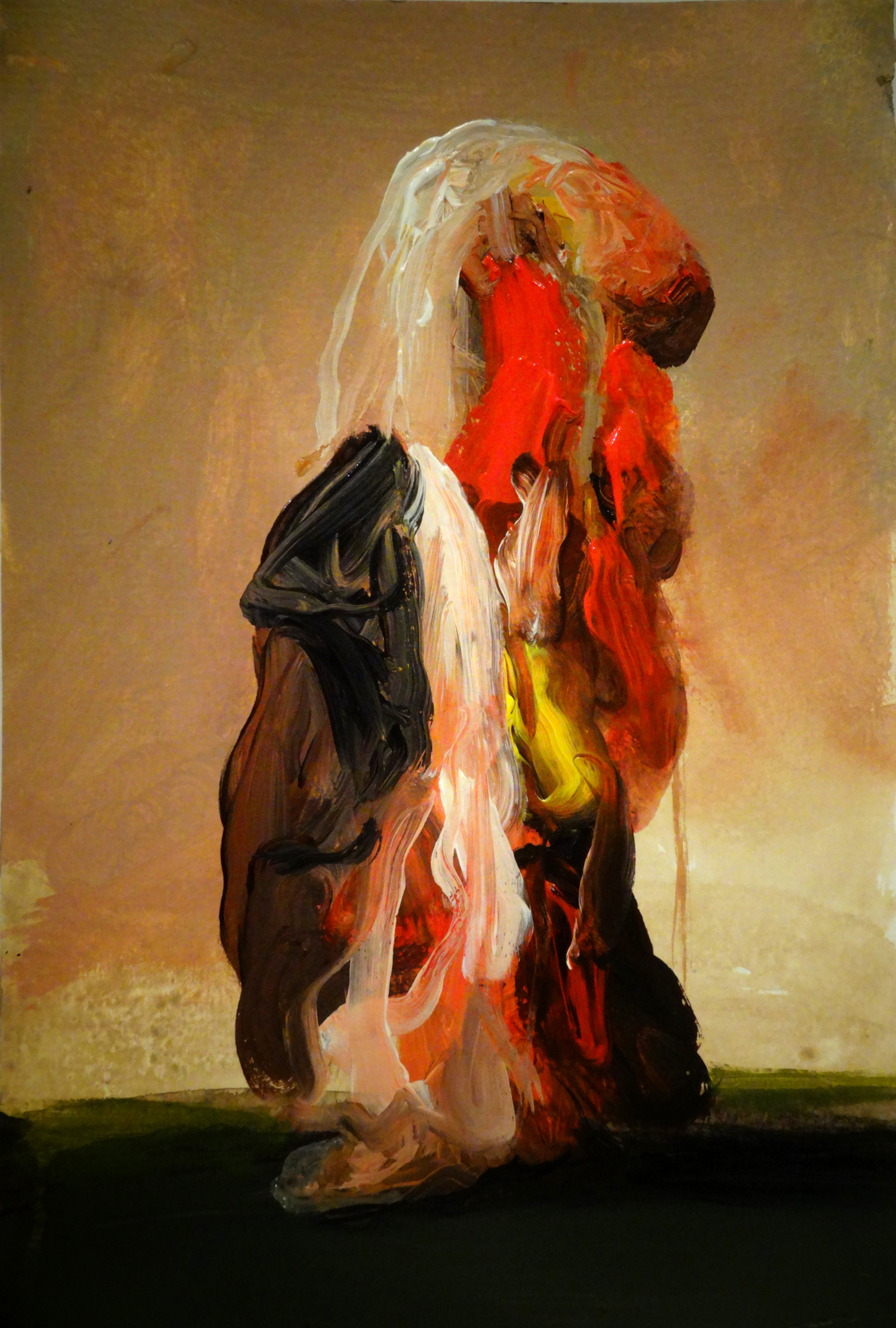
Untitled acrylic on paper by Spanish painter Joseba Eskubi 2013

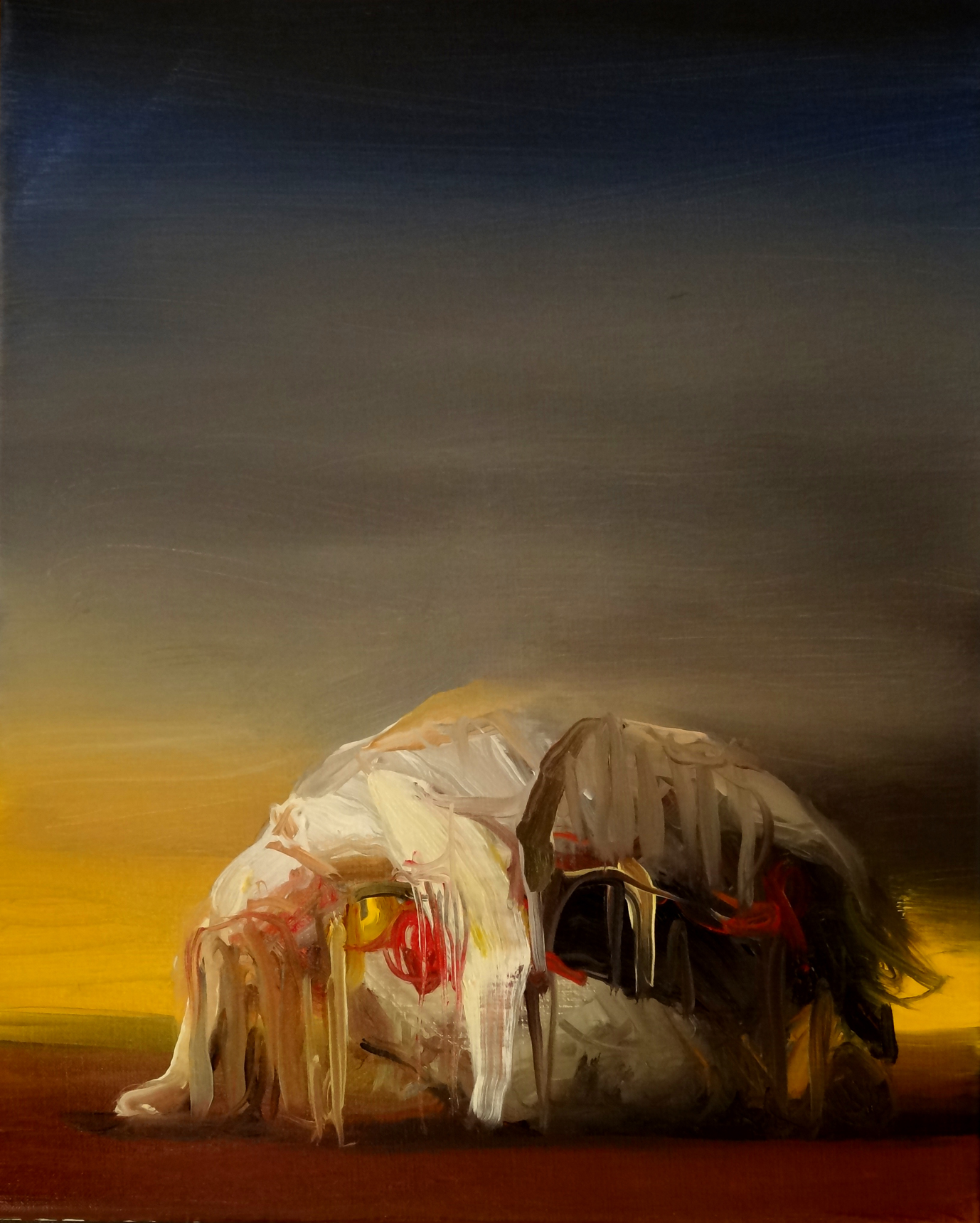
Untitled painting by Spanish painter Joseba Eskubi 2013

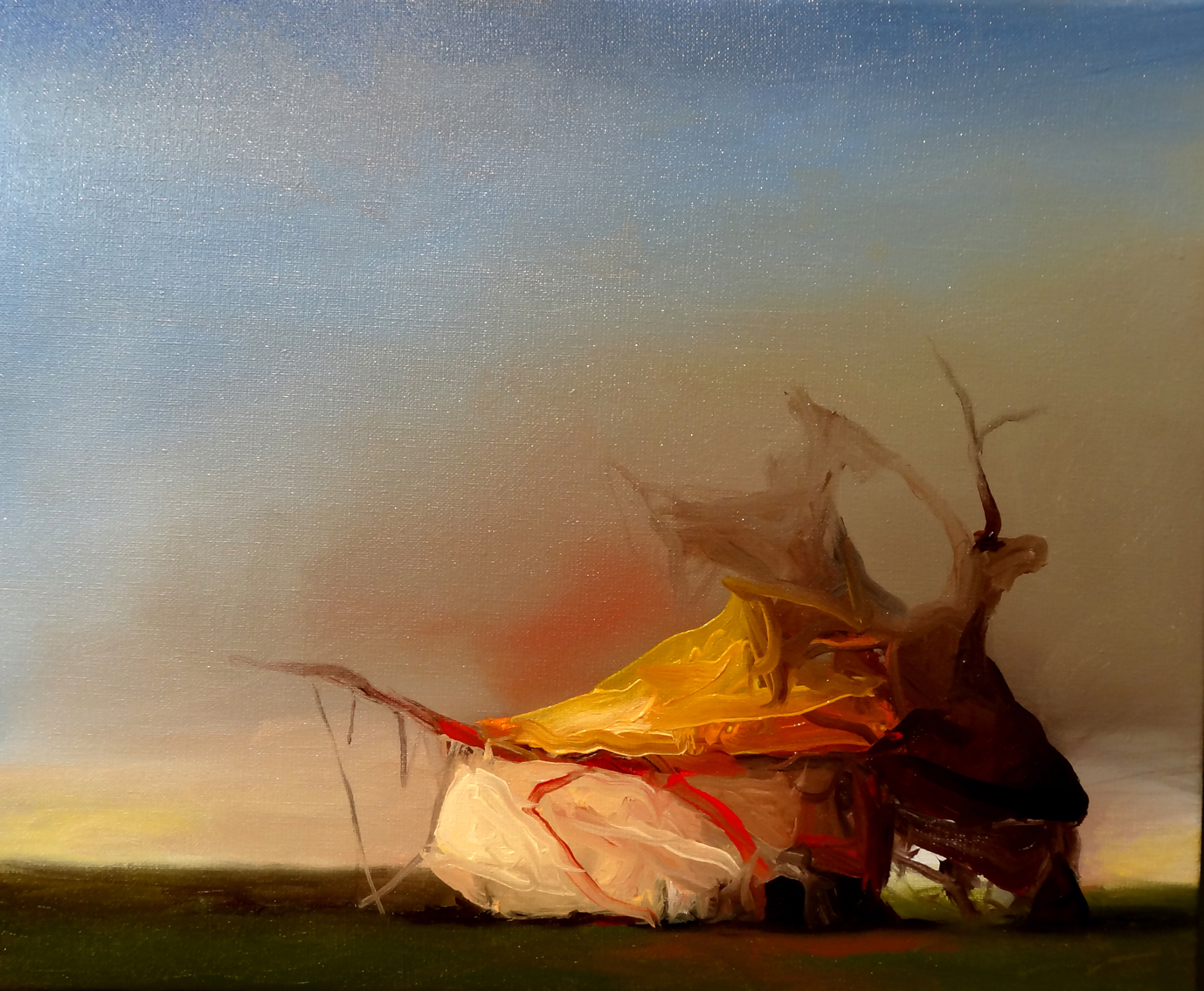
Untitled painting by Spanish painter Joseba Eskubi 2013

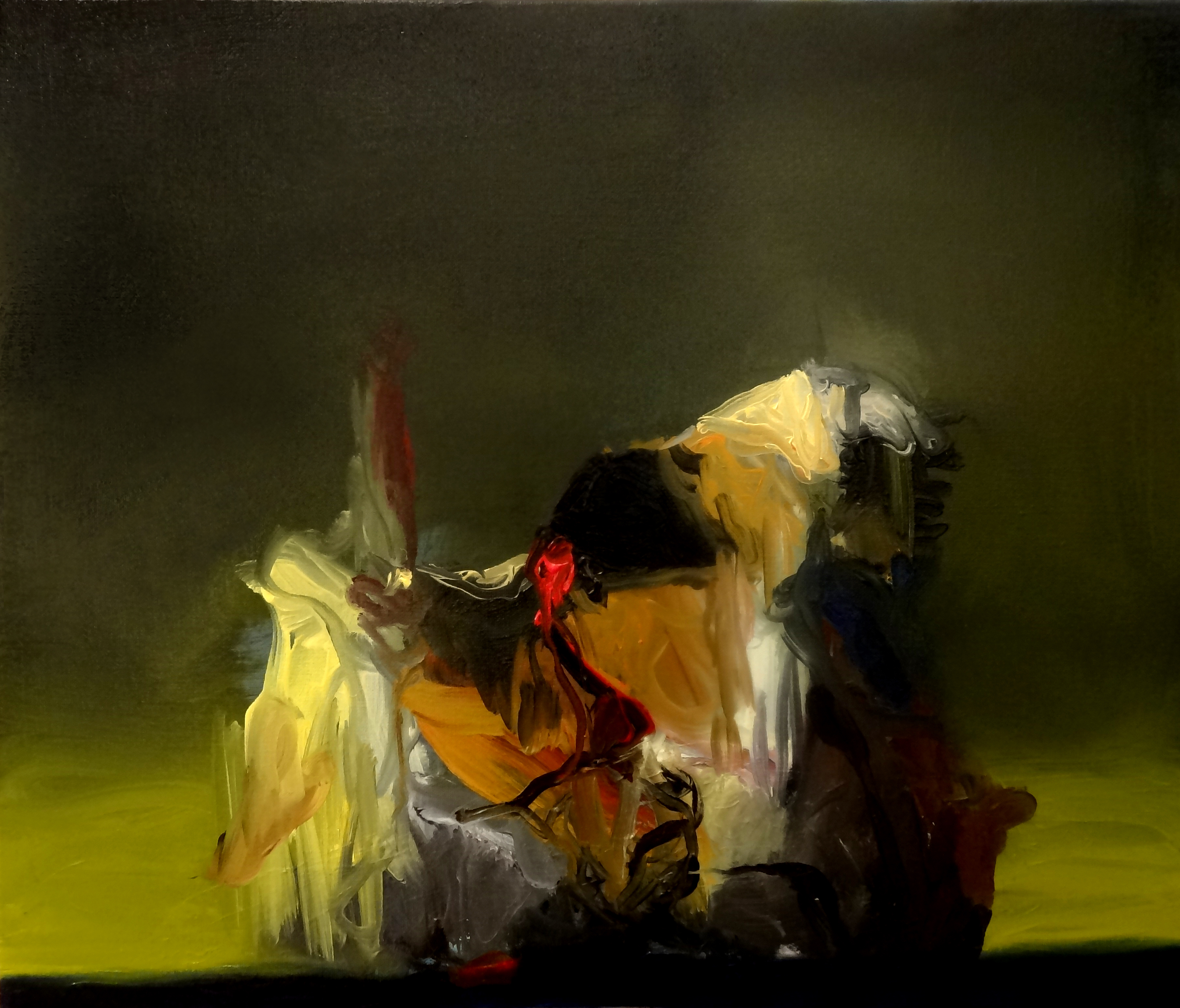
Untitled painting by Spanish painter Joseba Eskubi 2013

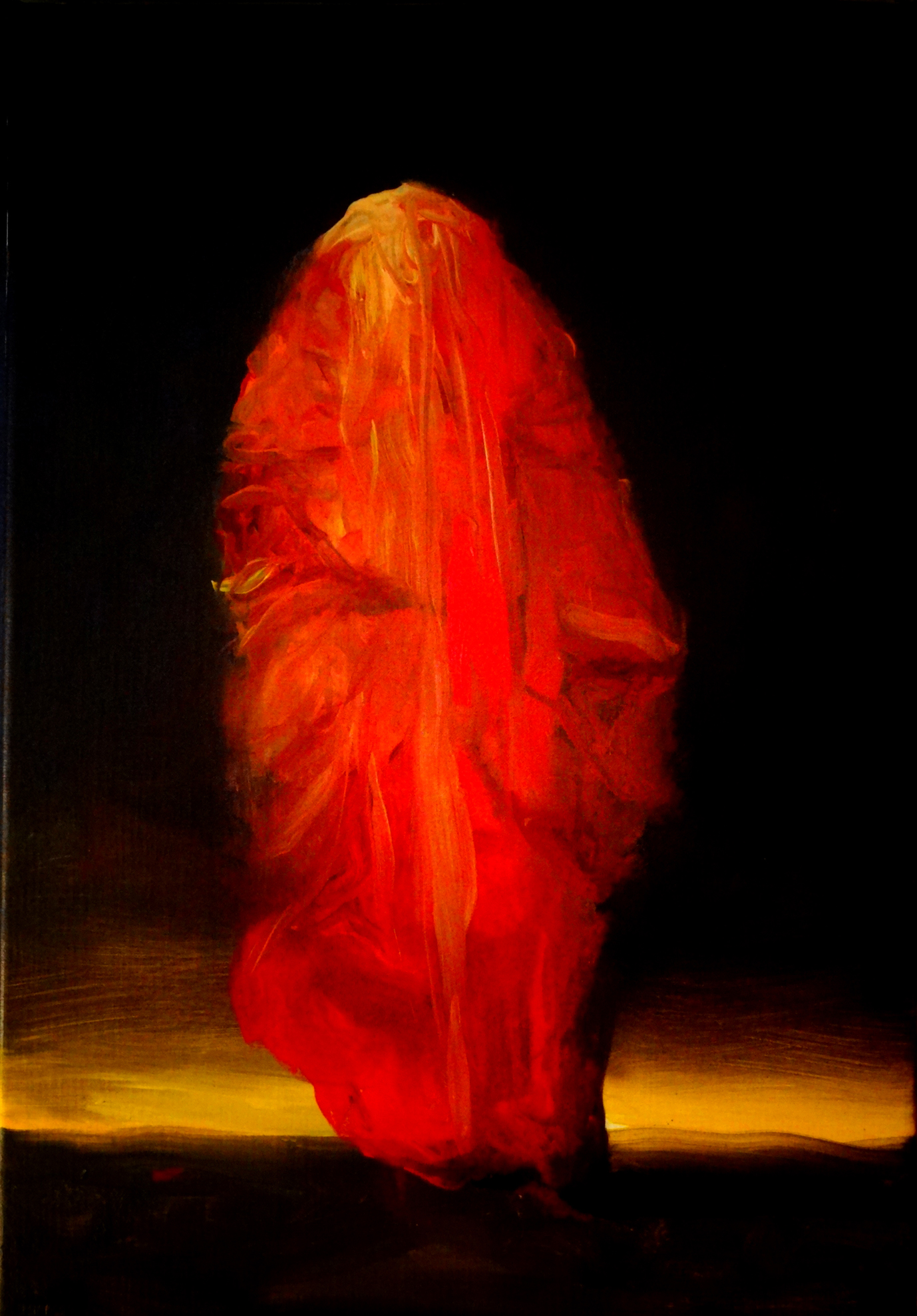
Untitled painting by Spanish painter Joseba Eskubi 2013

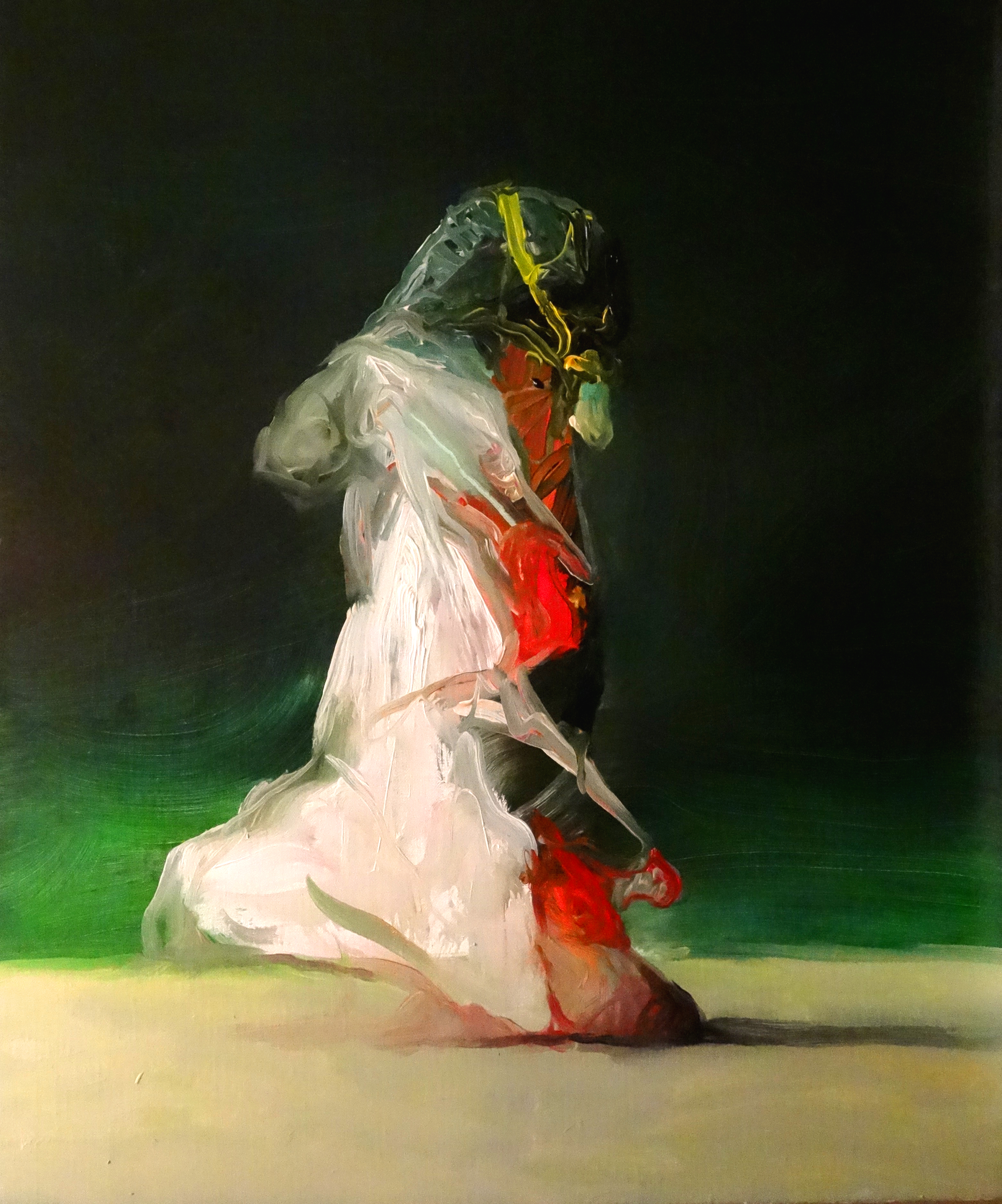
Untitled painting by Spanish painter Joseba Eskubi 2013

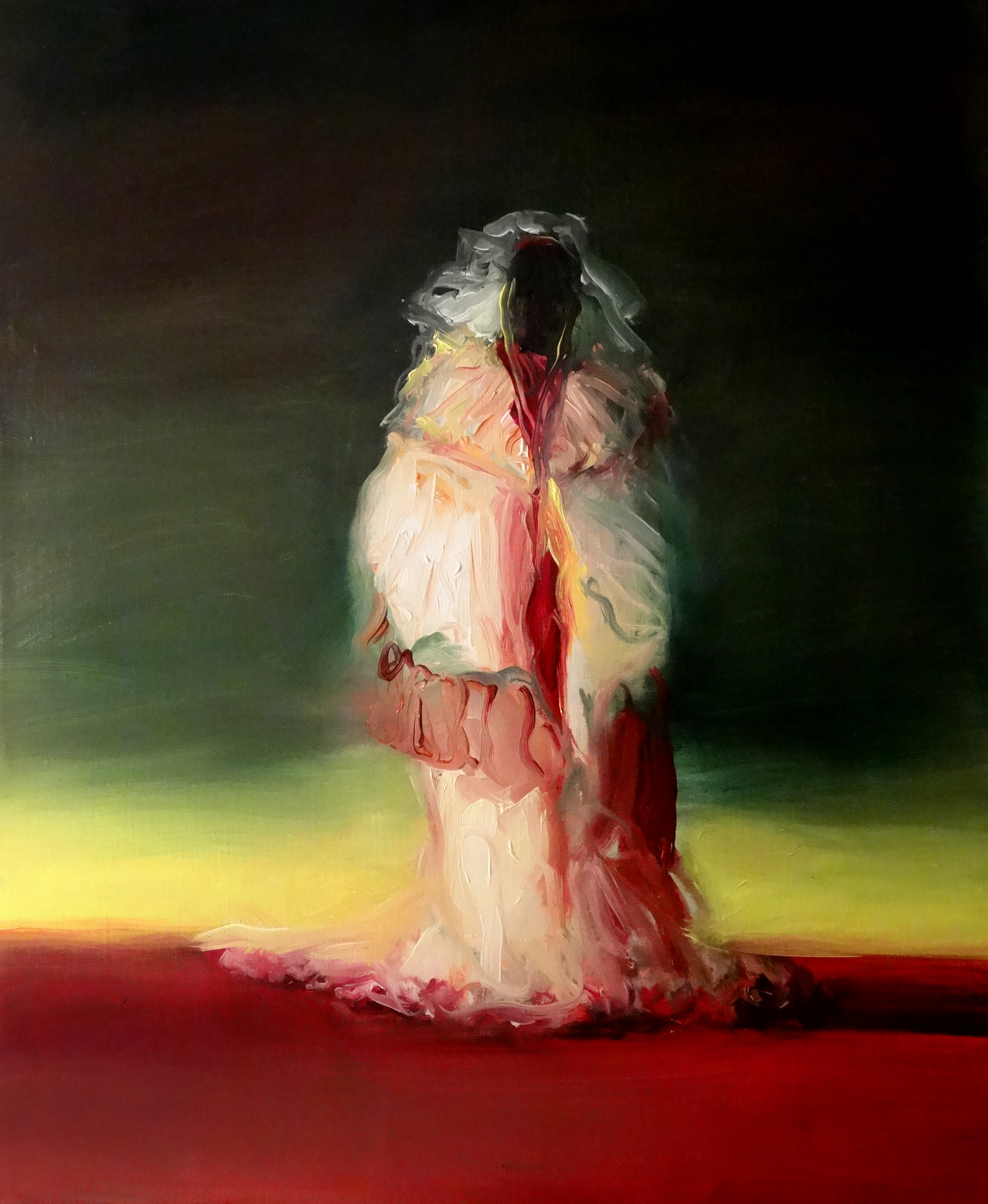
Untitled painting by Spanish painter Joseba Eskubi 2013

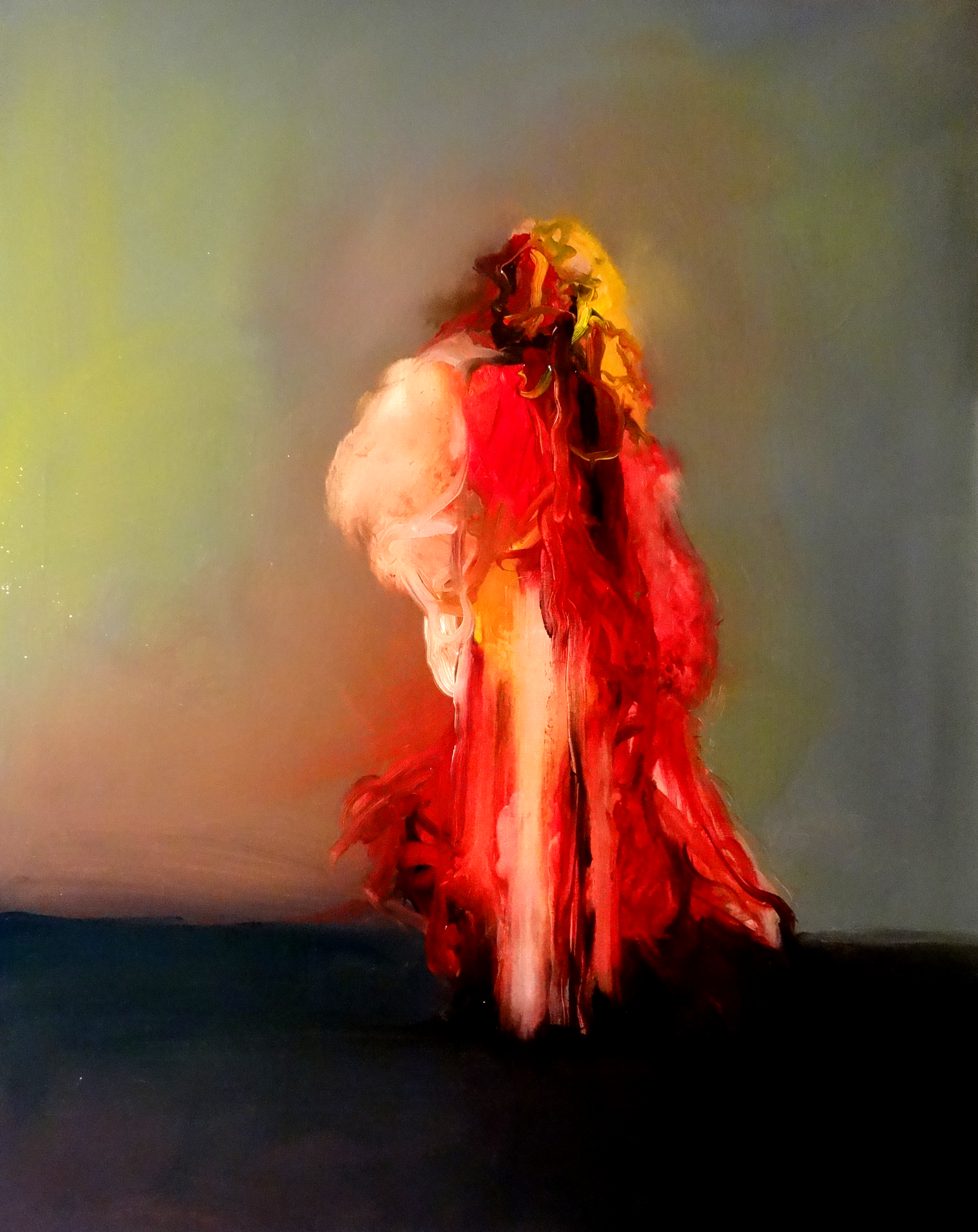
Untitled painting by Spanish painter Joseba Eskubi 2013
