= Argimiro España =

Spanish painter

Argimiro España (1906 – March 1995) was a Spanish painter. He was born in Fresno de la Fuente, Segovia and was known for his individualistic style. He made oil paintings on sackcloth.
