= Carlos Nadal =

Spanish painter

Carlos Nadal (24 April 1917 – 6 June 1998) was a Spanish painter of the Fauvist school.

== Life ==
Nadal was born in Paris on 24 April 1917, but moved to Barcelona in 1921. His father, Santiago Nadal (died 1932) had a commercial design studio, where Carlos not only learned to paint, but met modern artists including Henri Matisse, Raoul Dufy and Maurice Utrillo.

As well as the informal education from his father's business, he studied at the School of Arts and Crafts and the Senior Fine Art Academy of St George, both in Barcelona. He was conscripted into the Spanish Republican Army and fought in the Spanish Civil War, including imprisonment and escape from a concentration camp, before finally returning to his art studies, and in 1942 having his first solo exhibition.

On 1 December 1948 he married Flore Augusta Zoe Joris (died 30 April 1988) a Belgian sculptor, moving with her to Brussels in 1949. They had a daughter, Marina, in 1955 and a son, Alexandre, in 1957. In the following years they moved residence between Brussels and Barcelona. He died in Barcelona on 6 June 1998.

== Work ==
Nadal was particularly influenced by Henri Matisse whom he met as a child, and Georges Braque who was a close acquaintance in the 1940s, and maintained a love of the Fauvist style.

His first solo exhibition was in 1942 at La Pinacoteca in Barcelona. His early work was mainly of scenes in Spain or Belgium but when established as a successful artist he travelled extensively, making paintings which often featured modes of transport as well as leisure scenes.

According to one critic, the world of Nadal's paintings was "a flamboyant place where elements coming from everywhere enflame themselves in one frenzy".
