= Pedro Pedraja =

Spanish painter

Pedro Pedraja (born 1974) is a Spanish painter living in Great Britain.

== Life ==
He is originally from Santander, Spain. He is a graduate of The University of the Basque Country (UPV) in Bilbao, where he studied from 1997 to 2002.

In the 2004 Liverpool Biennial, Pedraja was selected to take part in the John Moores 23 exhibition of contemporary British painting at the Walker Museum. He exhibited at The Royal Academy of Arts in London – RA Summer Show 2006.

His work has been exhibited at the Doncaster Museum and the Eduardo Chillida Centre in Madrid.
