= Lluís Barba =

Spanish multidisciplinary artist

Lluís Barba is a multidisciplinary artist who works in media such as painting, photography, sculpture and the video art.

His representative works include the series Tourists in Art, Travellers in Time and Self-portraits, characterized by reading of masterpieces of the past.

== Biography ==
Born in Barcelona, he studied at the Llotja School and the Center for Visual Arts Massana School of Barcelona. Spain

Lluís Barba has exhibited his work in Europe, the US, Latin America, Canada, and Japan. His work is part of several public collections and museums MACBA Museum of Contemporary Art of Barcelona, Centro Wifredo Lam Contemporary Art Havana Marugame Hirai Spanish Contemporary Art Museum Japan, MADC Museum of Contemporary Art and Design in Costa Rica, MAVAO Visual Arts Museum Alejandro Otero, Jacobo Borges Museum MUJABO MACC and Museum of Contemporary Art of Caracas.

In 2007, Barba participated in 'The Garden of Earthly Delights', from the series Travellers in Time, based on the novel by Bosch at Art Basel Miami, cited in various media (CNN New York, The London Times, The Independent ...) and makes a music video collaboration for 'Steady Mobbin' Lil Wayne.

Since 2009, he has been part of the Young Masters, organized by Corbett Projects, working in various exhibitions in London. In 2010, Barba received the Young Masters Art Prize with the triptych 'The Hay Wain', exhibited at The Courtauld Institute of Art presents the installation with fiber optic 'The Last Supper' at The Old Truman Brewery in London.

In 2011, Self-portraits takes the historical memory of classic and contemporary artists and initiates a new dialogue with the viewer, not without irony, which deals with social issues. The most representative works in the series are 'Warhol', 'Frida Kahlo', 'Miro', 'Brueghel', Jan van Eyck.

In November 2012, 'The Painter's Studio' was auctioned in The British Friends of the Art Museums of Israel organized by Sotheby's in London.

== Artistic concept ==
Barba developed a reinterpretation opinion painting past related to the fragility of historical memory and power systems. His work of art masterpieces such as Bosch, Magritte, Brueghel ... establishing microhabitats in which prominent figures and aliens living individuals in our contemporary society.

Think critically about social inequalities and human behaviors, political, religious, ethnic conflicts and human rights violations. Conceptually his works reflect the future evolution of the human being, with analysis of diversity and expansion of hybrid forms: internet, film, television and advertising, combining the visual and the verbal.

== Awards ==
- 2011 Scotiabank Photography Awards. Contact Photography Festival. Toronto
- 2010 Art Prize Young Masters. The Courtauld Institut of Art London
- 2009 X Bienal Habana. Centro de Arte Wifredo Lam. La Habana
- 2006 Fotoseptiembre. Palais de Glace. Buenos Aires
- 1998 VII International Biennial of Cairo. El Cairo
- 1997 I Bienal de Fotografía de Lima
- 1995 Trasatlantica: the America-Europa non representativa. Caracas
