= Alonso de Llera Zambrano =

Spanish painter

Alonso de Llera Zambrano was a Spanish painter, active during the Baroque period. He was born in Cádiz, flourished in that city as a painter of banners for the royal navy, and executed, in 1639, altarpieces for the oratories of four galleons dispatched in that year to New Spain.
