= Pedro López (painter) =

Spanish painter

Pedro López was a Spanish painter. He was a pupil of El Greco. He painted, among many others, the Adoration of the Kings in the convent of the Trinitarians at Toledo; it bears his name, and the date 1608.
