= Hernán Picó Ribera =

Spanish painter, poster designer, and visual artist

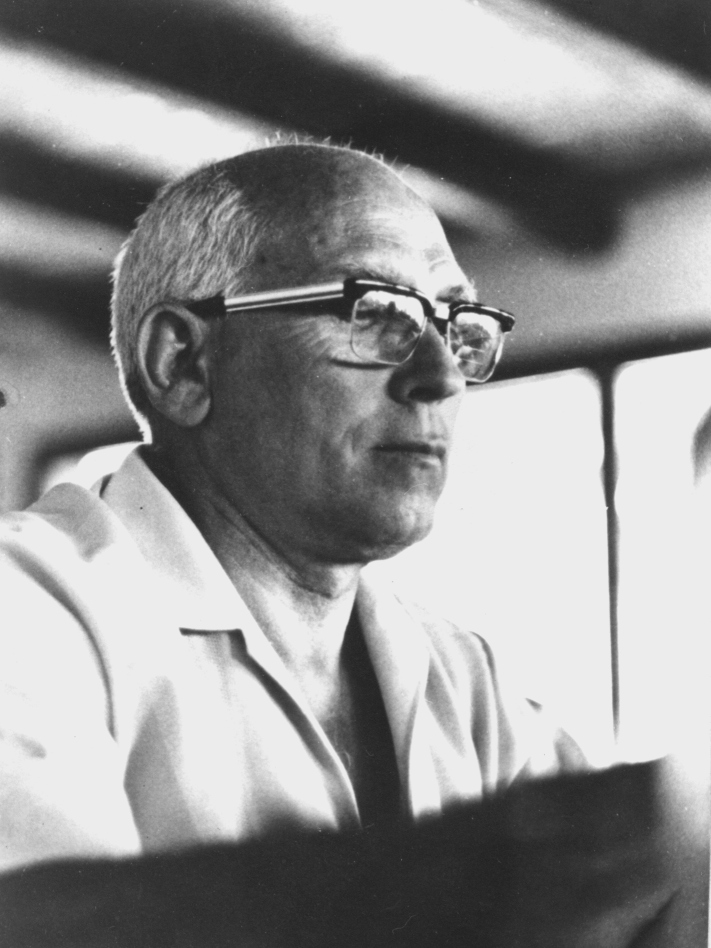
Hernán Picó i Ribera

Hernán Picó i Ribera (Barcelona, Catalonia, Spain 1911–1994) was a Spanish painter, poster designer, and visual artist.
