= Xevi Vilaró =

Spanish painter

- Born: Xevi Vilaró Planas; 12 January 1975 (age 51); La Cellera de Ter, Girona (Catalonia, Spain)
- Known for: Painting
- Movement: Pop-realism
- Website: web archive

Xevi Vilaró (born 12 January 1975 in La Cellera de Ter, Girona, Catalonia), is a Spanish painter.

Vilaró captured the public's attention in the year 2000, after winning the First Prize of the Gallerie Artitude in Paris, France.

A selection of his works is part of the permanent collection of the prestigious Vila Casas Foundation.
