= José Sanfrancisco Orero =

Spanish painter

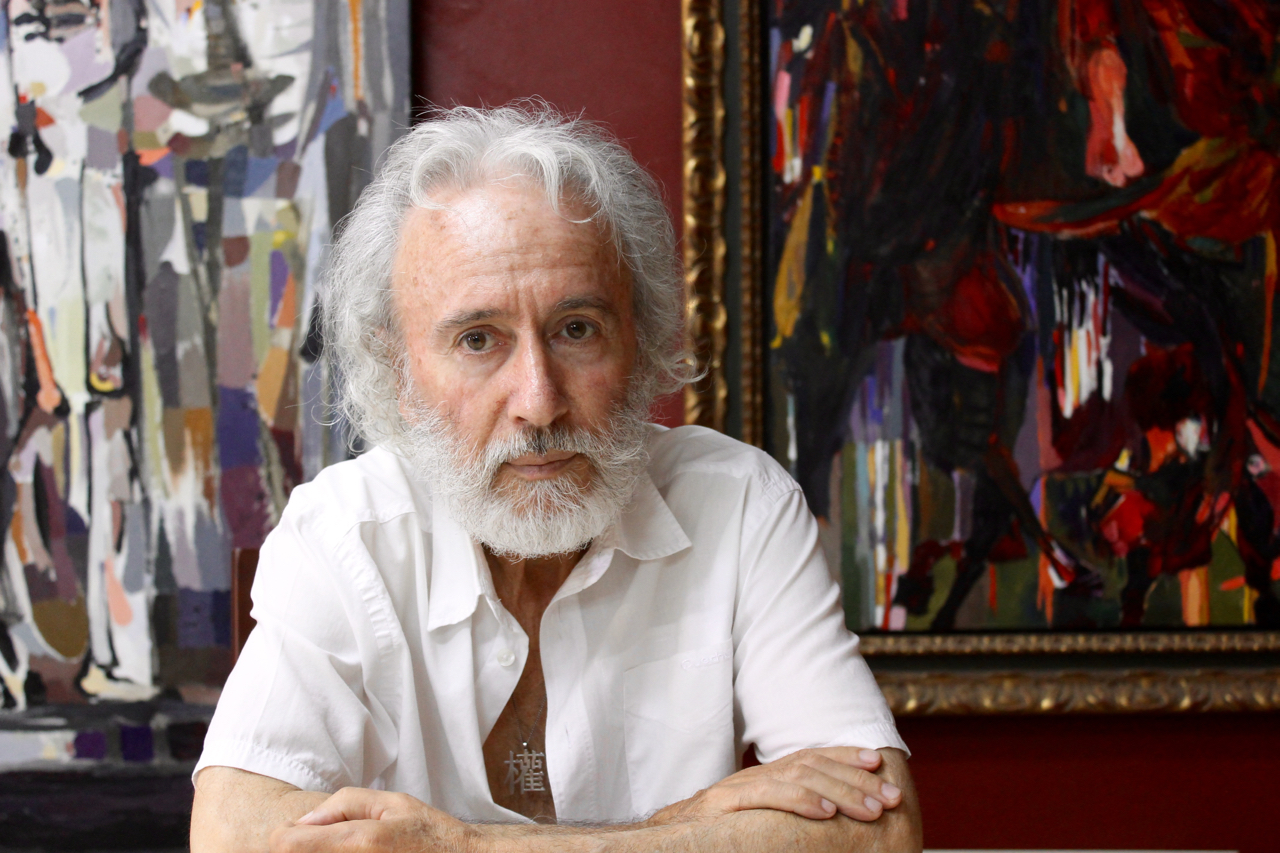
- Born: José Sanfrancisco Orero; 9 April 1944; Valencia, Spain
- Education: Academia Provincial de Bellas Artes y Escuela de Artes Aplicadas a la Arquitectura e Ingeniería in Mendoza (Argentina)
- Known for: Painting, drawing, sculpture, writing, poetry, engraving
- Notable work: Música Salvaje (1964); Barco en su Descanso (1965)
- Movement: Abstract Expressionism

José Sanfrancisco Orero (born 9 April 1944) is a Spanish painter, sculptor, poet and writer belonging to the expressionism movement.

Born in Valencia, Spain, his family moved to Mendoza, Argentina in 1950. There, in 1958, he enrolled into the Academia Provincial de Bellas Artes y Escuela de Artes Aplicadas a la Aquitecture e Ingeniería at the age of 13.

One of his better known works is Música Salvaje (1964), for which he won the Gran Premio de Pintura de Salón Nacional de San Luís (Argentina) in 1965. In 1967 he wrote Antes del mármol, a small collection of poems published in Argentina, which is available today in some notable public and university research libraries including the New York Public Library, Stanford University Library and Yale University Library.
