= Pedro Ramírez (painter) =

Spanish painter

Pedro Ramírez was a Spanish painter another of the family of artists who flourished in Seville in the 17th century. He was one of the first members of the Academy established in that city.
