= Juan de Zurbarán =

Painter from Spain (1620–1649)

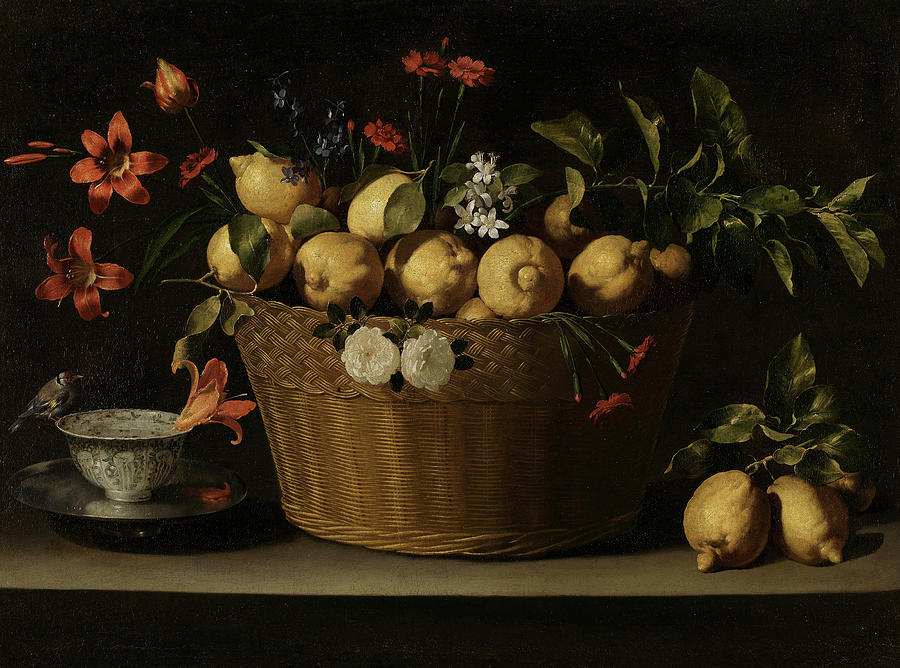
Still Life with Lemons in a Wicker Basket, circa 1643, National Gallery, London

Juan de Zurbarán (1620–1649) was a Spanish Baroque painter.

Juan de Zurbarán was born in Llerena, Badajoz, the son of Francisco de Zurbarán (1598–1664), and joined in the workshop that his father owned in Seville, with which it is likely they collaborated on different paintings, including Still Life with Pots. The parental influence is evident in his work, but also his style reflects Dutch, Lombard and Neapolitan influences. He primarily painted still life genre.

Some of his works include Still Life with Fruit and Goldfinch and Still Life with Basket of Apples, Quinces and Pomegranates, preserved in the Museu Nacional d'Art de Catalunya, the Flowers and Fruits in Chinese Porcelain of the Art Institute of Chicago, and the Plate with Apple and Orange Blossoms in a private collection, among other works autographed or attributed.

In 1641 he married Mariana de Cuadros, daughter of a rich merchant, who died soon after. Juan de Zurbarán's career was cut short by his early death at age 29. He contracted the plague during the epidemic that ravaged Sevilla in 1649 and died along with several of his brothers.

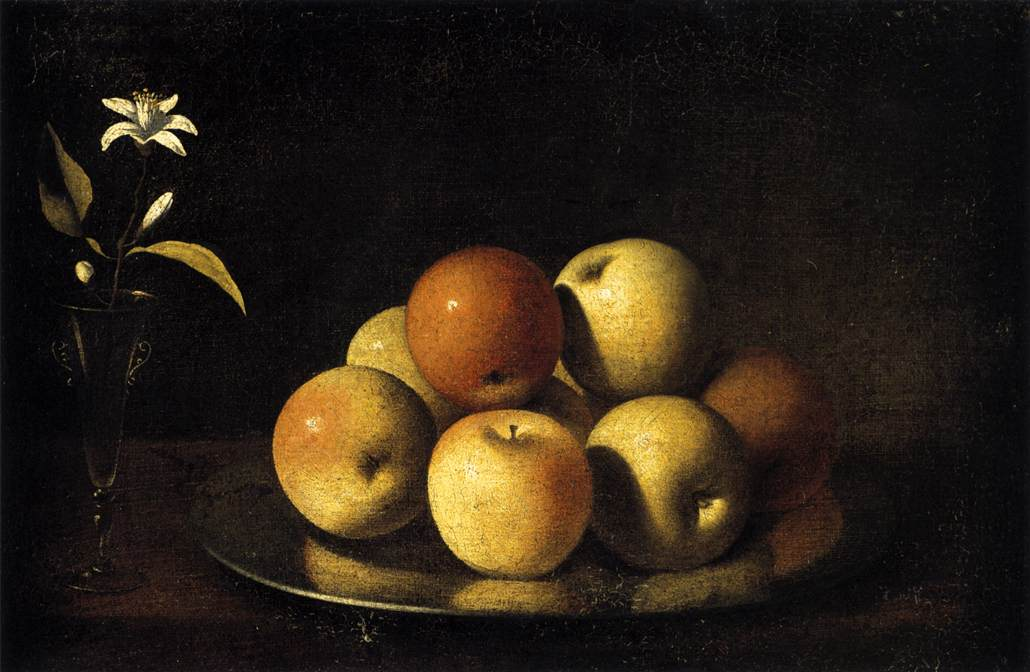
Still Life with Plate of Apples and Orange Blossom.

== External links and references ==
- National Museum of Catalan Art, Museo Nacional del Prado, BBVA (ed.): "Still Lifes" (in Spanish)
