= The Virgin Mary as a Child Praying =

1650s painting by Francisco de Zurbarán

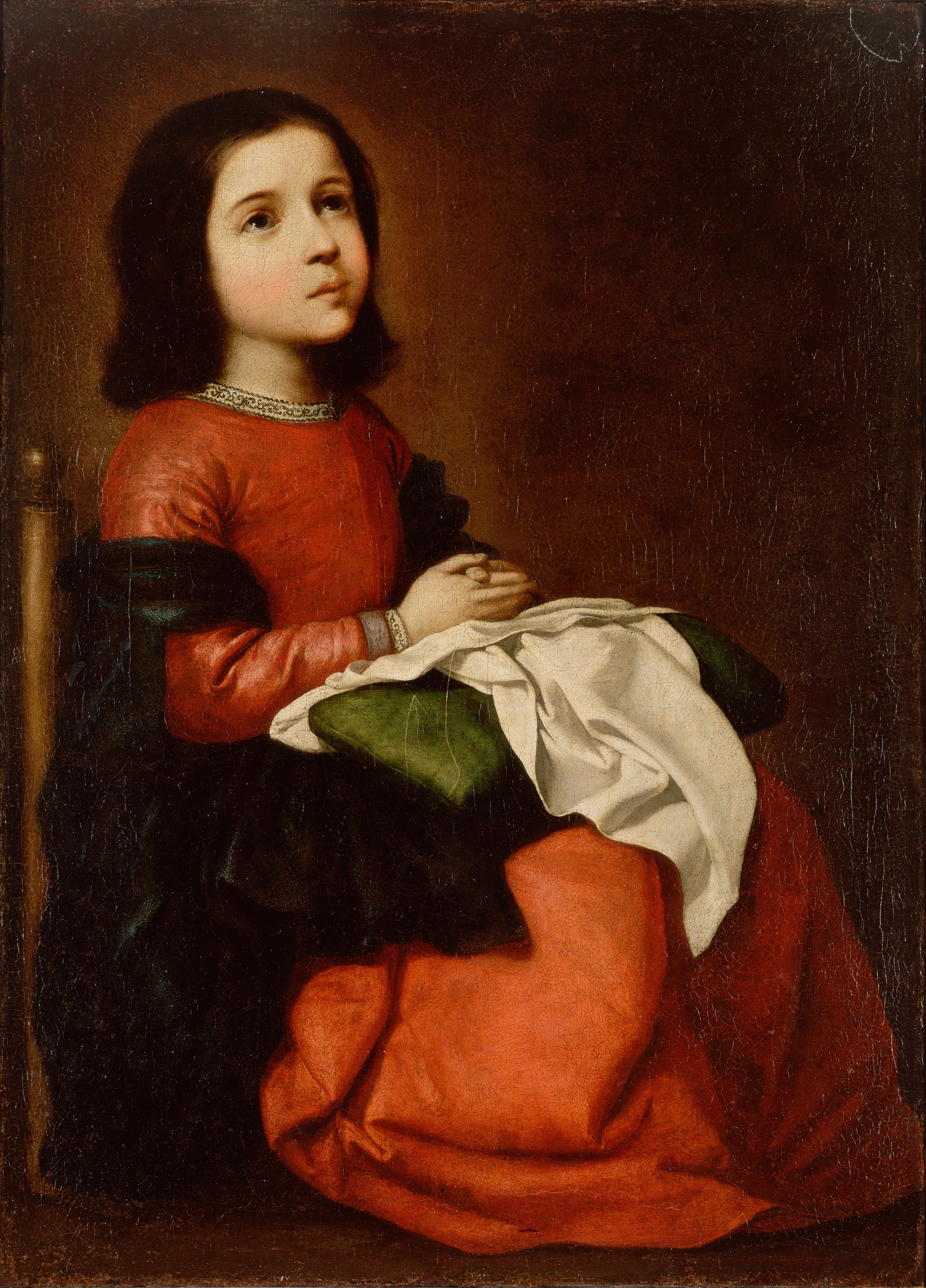
The Virgin Mary as a Child Praying (1658-1660) by Francisco de Zurbarán

The Virgin Mary as a Child Praying is a 1658–1660 painting by Francisco de Zurbarán, now in the Hermitage Museum in St Petersburg. Its theme is similar to that of his The Young Virgin (Metropolitan Museum of Art). The painter completed the work in Madrid a few years before his death.
