= Saint Elizabeth of Portugal (Zurbarán) =

C 1630s painting by Francisco de Zurbarán

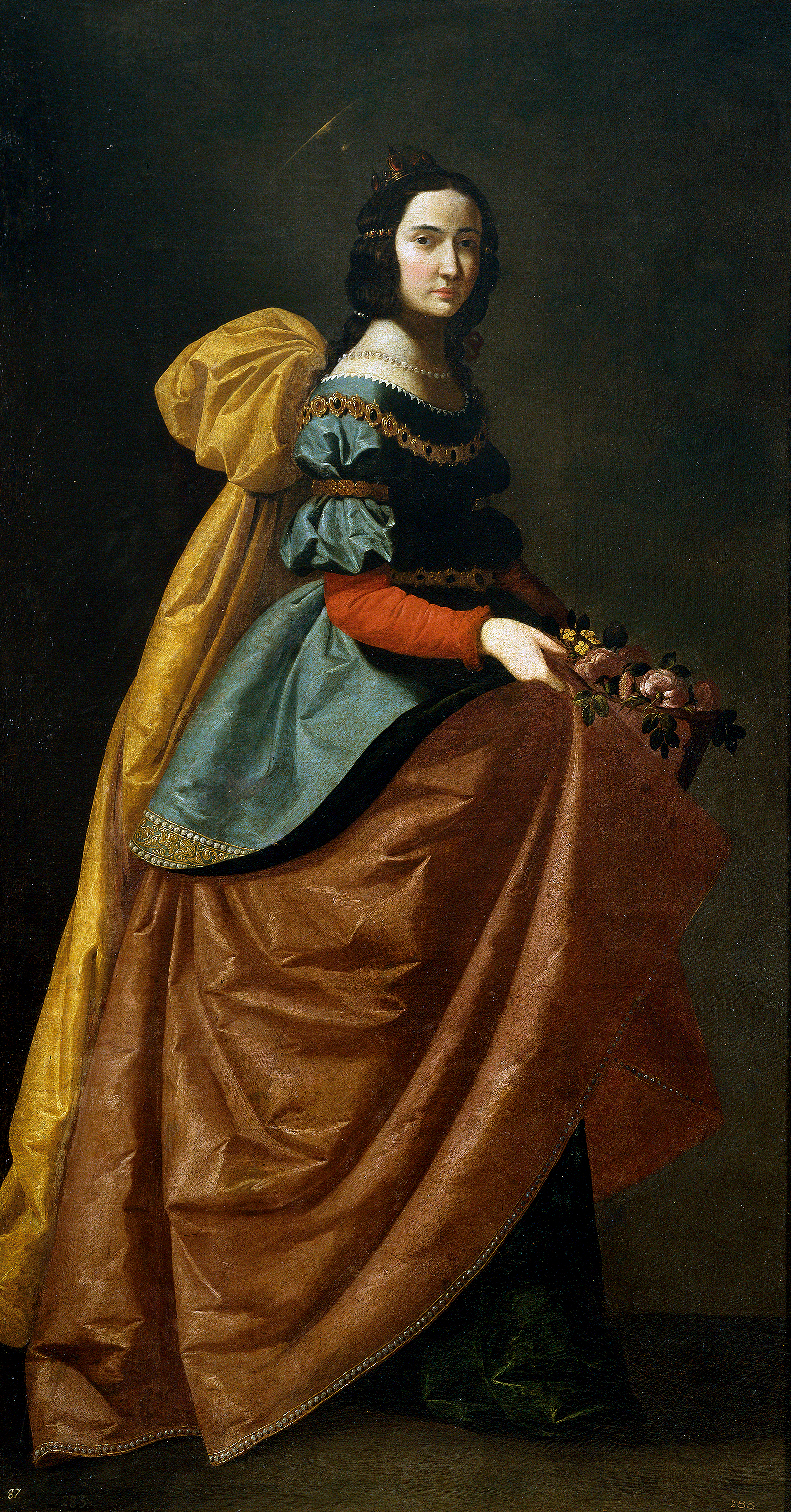
Saint Elizabeth of Portugal (1630–1635) by Francisco de Zurbarán

Saint Elizabeth of Portugal is an oil painting on canvas executed ca. 1630–1635 by the Spanish painter Francisco de Zurbarán. It depicts Queen Saint Elizabeth of Portugal, daughter of Peter III of Aragon and wife of Denis of Portugal. She was known for her generosity, and the painting depicts the queen in the legendary "miracle of the roses", when she was able to turn bread into roses, which she intended to give to the poor, after being asked by her husband about what she was hiding. Since 1818, the painting has been in the Prado Museum in Madrid.
