= Juan Caro de Tavira =

Spanish painter

Juan Caro de Tavira was a Spanish painter, who flourished in the 17th century. He was a native of Carmona and pupil of Francisco de Zurbarán. He died young, but his skill procured him the cross of Santiago from Philip IV of Spain.
