= Ignacio de Ries =

Spanish painter

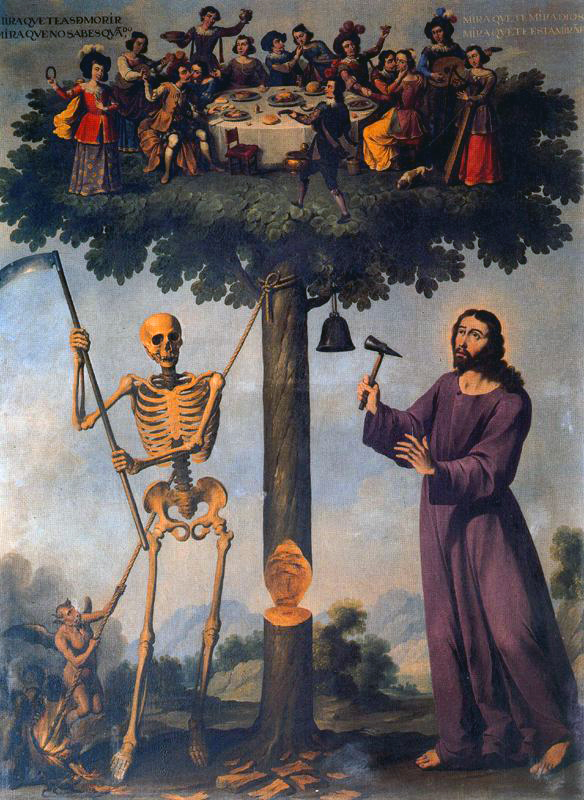
The Tree of Life, Segovia Cathedral.

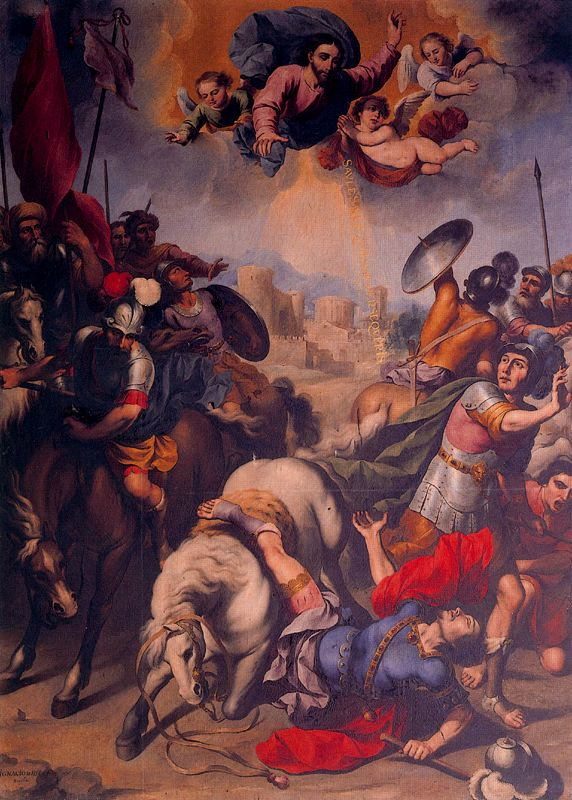
Conversion of St Paul, Segovia Cathedral.

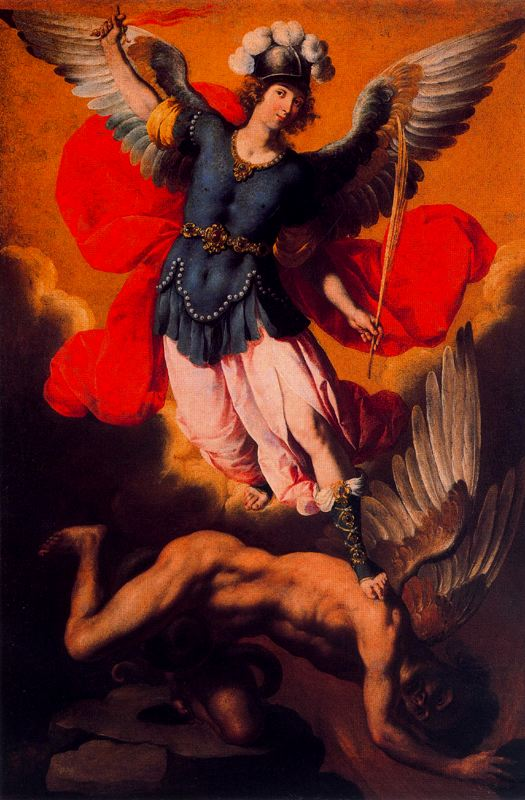
St Michael the Archangel, Metropolitan Museum, New York

Ignacio de Ries (c. 1612 – after 1661) was a Spanish Baroque painter.

== Life ==
He was probably born in Flanders, then part of the Spanish Netherlands. Written sources show him active in Seville between 1636 and 1661. From his very first works onwards his technique shows a remarkable closeness to that of Zurbarán, in whose studio he was recorded in 1636, though his subjects were different to Zurbarán's and more Rubenesque. In his final years he was also influenced by Murillo, adding greater dynamism to his work without renouncing his original style. He probably died in Seville.

== Selected works ==
=== Capilla de la Concepción, Segovia Cathedral (1653) ===
This chapel was founded in 1645 by captain Pedro Fernández de Miñano y Contreras and contains de Ries' most important works.

- The Tree of Life, a Vanitas-type allegorical curiosity.
- Adoration of the Shepherds
- Conversion of St Paul
- Baptism of Christ
- Coronation of the Virgin
- King David

=== Capilla de San Antonio, Seville Cathedral ===
- Saints Isidore and Leander
- Saints Justa and Rufina

=== Seville ===
- The Immaculate Conception (San Ildefonso)
- The Immaculate Conception (Museo de Bellas Artes)
- Saint Justa (Colección Salinas)
- Assumption of the Virgin (1661, San Bartolomé)

=== Other ===
- San Michael the Archangel (Marquand Collection, Metropolitan Museum of Art)
- Regina Coeli (Colección Banco Central Hispano)

== Bibliography ==
- (in Spanish) Pérez Sánchez, Alonso E., Pintura Barroca en España, 1600-1750. Editorial Cátedra, Madrid ISBN 978-84-376-0994-2
