= Saint Luke Painting the Crucifixion =

Painting by Francisco de Zurbarán

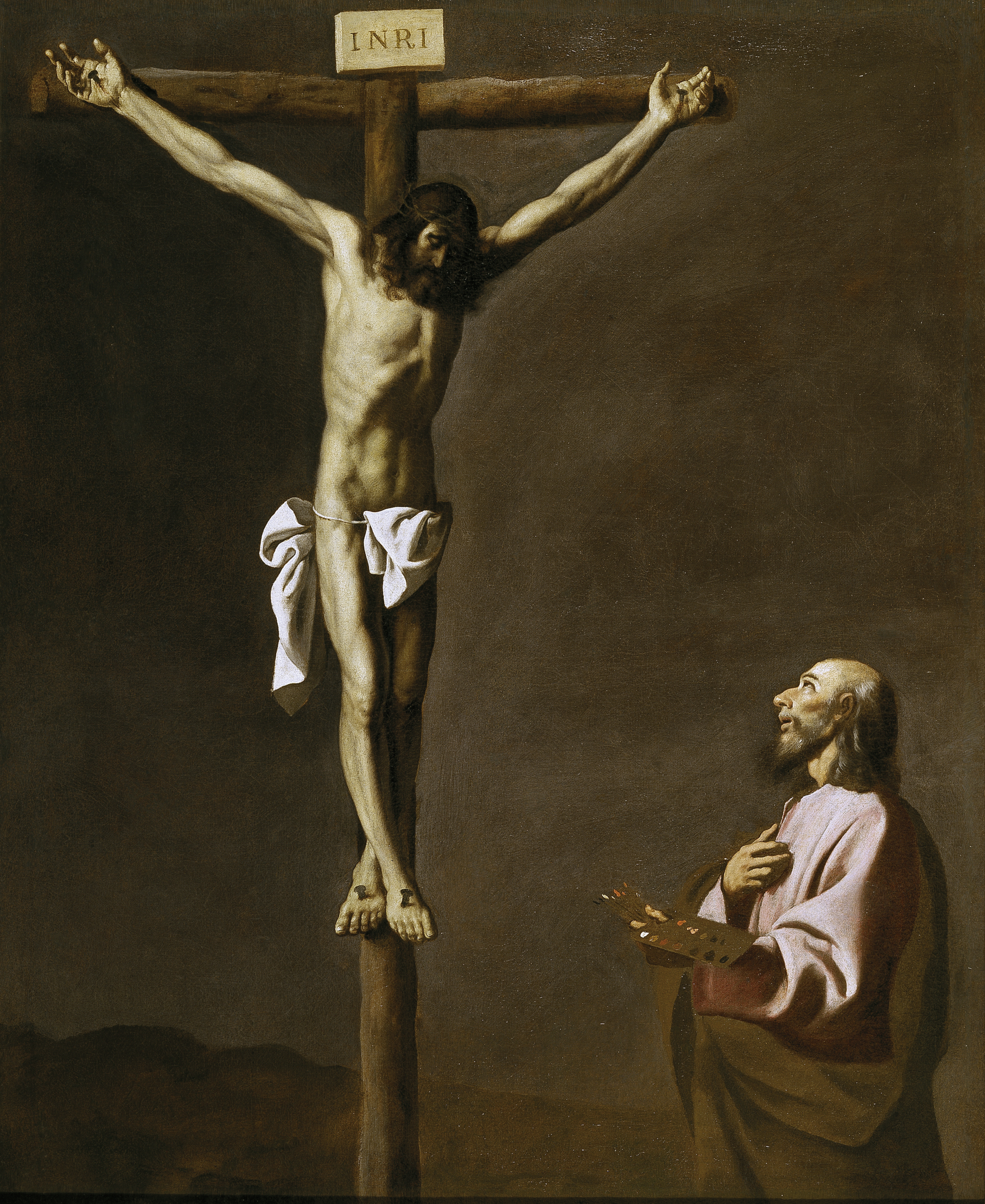
Saint Luke Painting the Crucifixion (c. 1650) by Francisco de Zurbarán

Saint Luke Painting the Crucifixion is an oil on canvas painting by Francisco de Zurbarán, executed c. 1650, also known as Crucifixion with Saint Luke or The Crucified Christ with a Painter. It is now in the Prado Museum. The figure of Saint Luke is thought to be a self-portrait of the artist.

== Bibliography ==
- (in Spanish) Antonio Fernández Paradas, Escultura Barroca Española. Nuevas lecturas desde los Siglos de Oro a la sociedas del conocimento - Escultura Barroca Andaluza - Volumen II, ExLibric, 2016.
