= Francisco de Zurbarán =

Spanish painter (1598–1664)

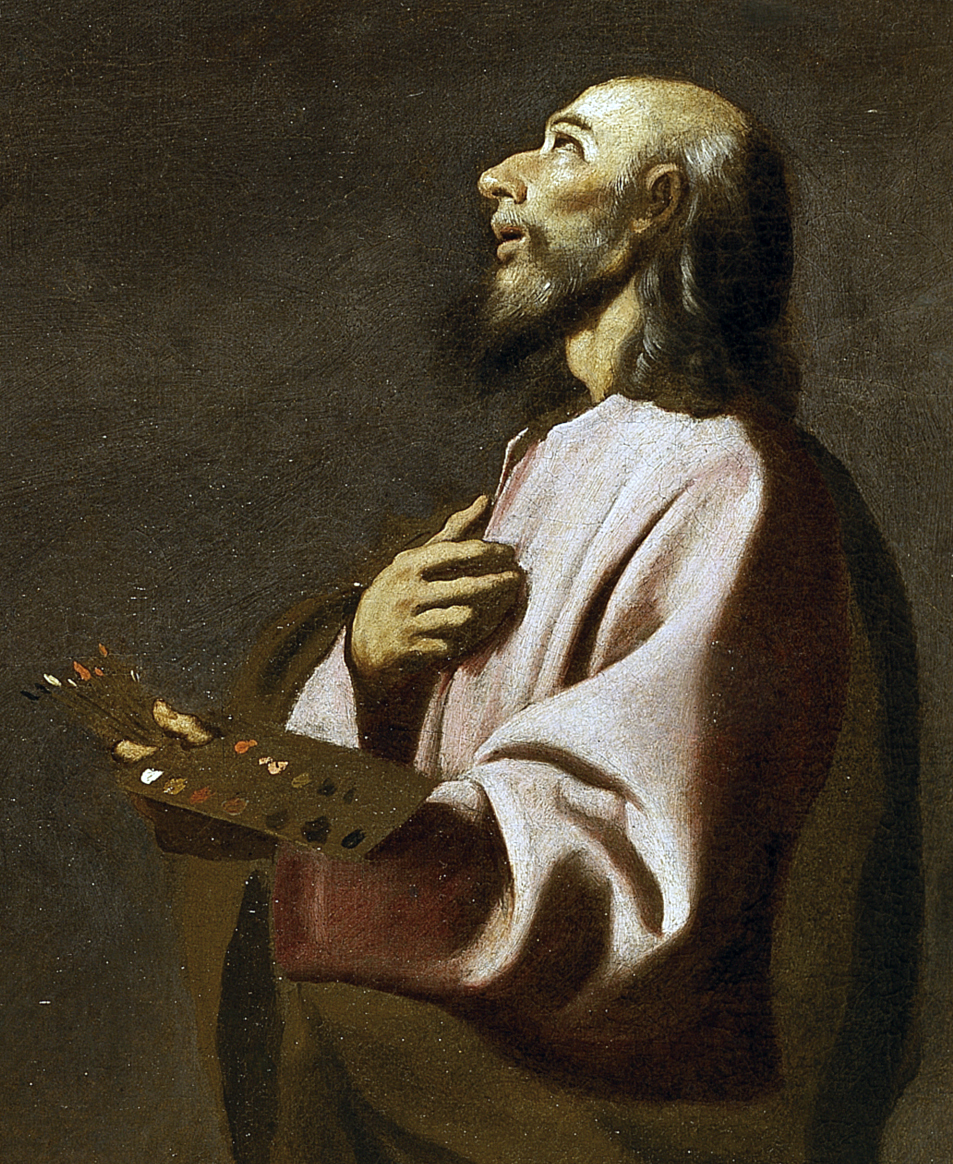
- Probable self-portrait of Francisco de Zurbarán as Saint Luke, c. 1635–1640, Museo del Prado, Madrid
- Born: 7 November 1598 (baptized); Fuente de Cantos, Extremadura, Crown of Castile
- Died: 27 August 1664 (aged 65); Madrid, Crown of Castile
- Known for: Painting
- Movement: Spanish Baroque; Caravaggisti
- Patrons: Philip IV of Spain; Diego Velázquez

Francisco de Zurbarán (/ˌzʊərbəˈrɑːn/ ZOOR-bə-RAHN, Spanish: [fɾanˈθisko ðe θuɾβaˈɾan]; 1598 – 27 August 1664) was a Spanish Baroque painter known for his religious paintings depicting monks, nuns and martyrs, and for his still lifes. Zurbarán made forceful use of chiaroscuro, in which he excelled. He was the father of the painter Juan de Zurbarán.

== Biography ==
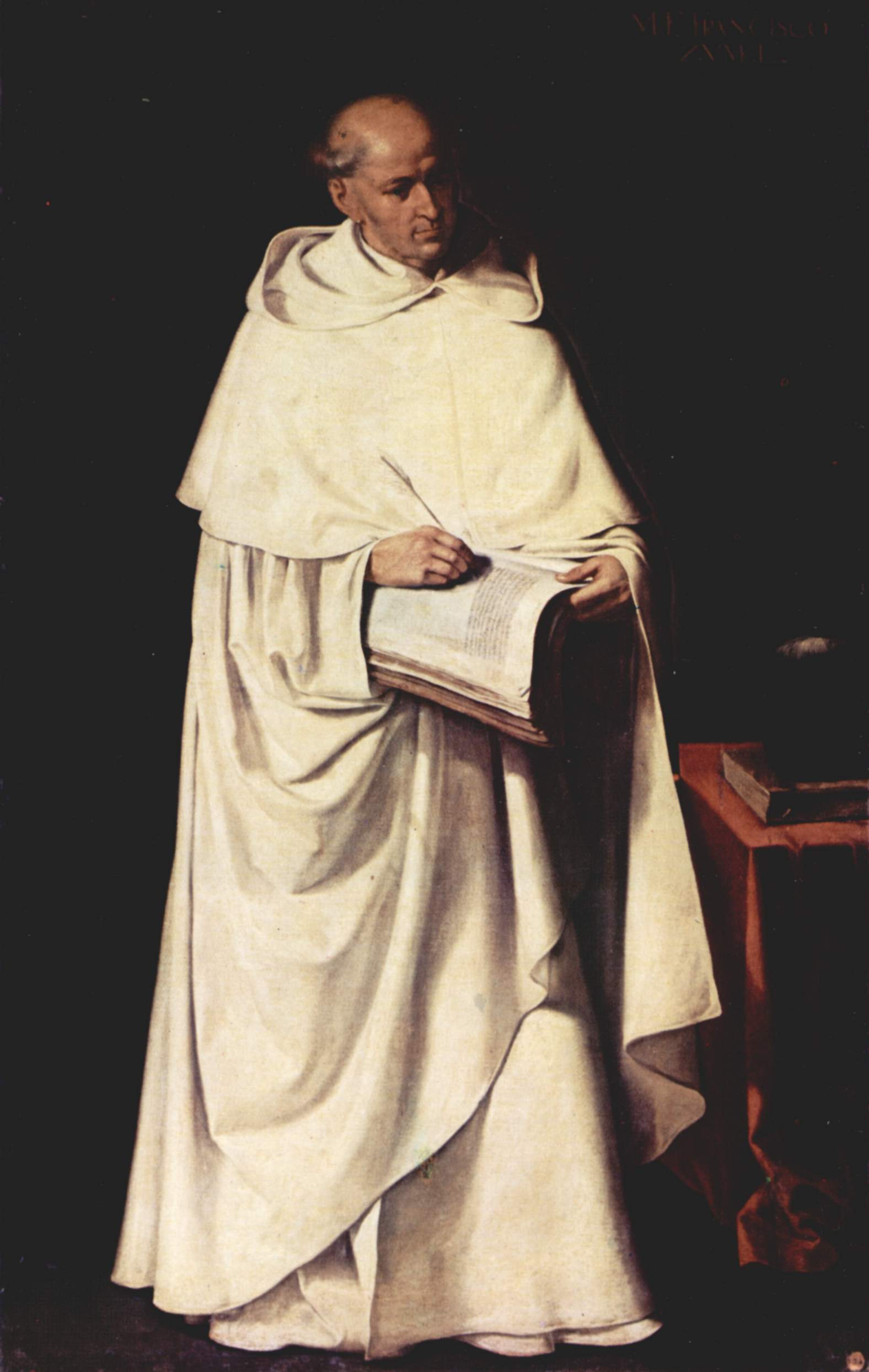
1633 portrait of Francisco Zumel, Real Academia de Bellas Artes de San Fernando, Madrid

Zurbarán was born in 1598 in Fuente de Cantos, Extremadura; he was baptized on 7 November of that year. His parents were Luis de Zurbarán, a haberdasher, and his wife, Isabel Márquez. In childhood he set about imitating objects with charcoal. In 1614 his father sent him to Seville to apprentice for three years with Pedro Díaz de Villanueva, an artist of whom very little is known.

Zurbarán's first marriage, in 1617, was to María Paet who was nine years older. María died in 1624 after the birth of their third child. In 1625 he married again to wealthy widow Beatriz de Morales. On 17 January 1626, Zurbarán signed a contract with the prior of the Dominican monastery San Pablo el Real in Seville, agreeing to produce 21 paintings within eight months. Fourteen of the paintings depicted the life of Saint Dominic; the others represented Saint Bonaventura, Saint Thomas Aquinas, and the four Doctors of the Church. This commission established Zurbarán as a painter. On 29 August 1628, Zurbarán was commissioned by the Mercedarians of Seville to produce 22 paintings for the cloister in their monastery. In 1629, the Elders of Seville invited Zurbarán to relocate permanently to the city, as his paintings had gained such high reputation that he would increase the reputation of Seville. He accepted the invitation and moved to Seville with his wife Beatriz de Morales, the three children from his first marriage, a relative called Isabel de Zurbarán and eight servants. In May 1639 his second wife, Beatriz de Morales, died.

Towards 1630 he was appointed painter to Philip IV, and there is a story that on one occasion the sovereign laid his hand on the artist's shoulder, saying "Painter to the king, king of painters". After 1640 his austere, harsh, hard-edged style was unfavorably compared to the sentimental religiosity of Murillo and Zurbarán's reputation declined. Beginning by the late 1630s, Zurbarán's workshop produced many paintings for export to South America. Jacob and his twelve sons, a series depicting the patriarch Jacob and his 12 sons, seems to have been aimed at the South America market, but the originals were acquired for Auckland Castle in Bishop Auckland, Co. Durham, England.

On 7 February 1644, Zurbarán married a third time with another wealthy widow, Leonor de Torder. It was only in 1658, late in Zurbarán's life, that he moved to Madrid in search of work and renewed his contact with Velázquez. Popular myth has Zurbarán dying in poverty, but at his death the value of his estate was about 20,000 reales.

== Style ==
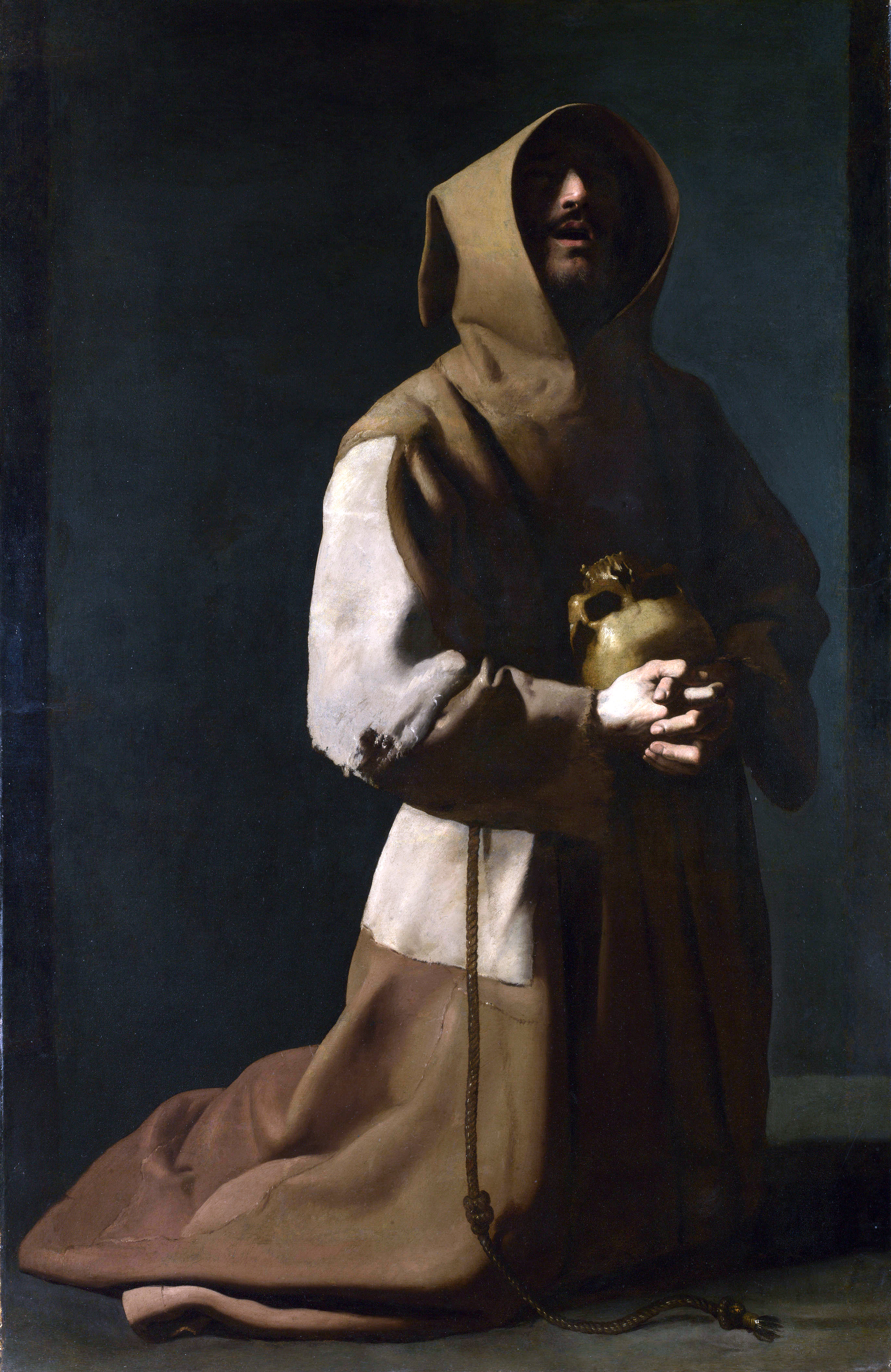
Saint Francis in Meditation, 1639, National Gallery, London

It is unknown whether Zurbarán had the opportunity to see the paintings of Caravaggio, only that his work features a similar use of chiaroscuro and tenebrism (dramatic lighting). The painter thought by some art historians to have had the greatest influence on his characteristically severe compositions was Juan Sánchez Cotán. Polychrome sculpture—which by the time of Zurbarán's apprenticeship had reached a level of sophistication in Seville that surpassed that of the local painters—provided another important stylistic model for the young artist; the work of Juan Martínez Montañés is especially close to Zurbarán's in spirit.

He painted his figures directly from nature, and he made great use of the lay-figure in the study of draperies, in which he was particularly proficient. He had a special gift for white draperies; as a consequence, the houses of the white-robed Carthusians are abundant in his paintings. To these rigid methods, Zurbarán is said to have adhered throughout his career, which was prosperous, wholly confined to Spain, and varied by few incidents beyond those of his daily labour. His subjects were mostly severe and ascetic religious vigils, the spirit chastising the flesh into subjection, the compositions often reduced to a single figure. Zurbaran's "incapacity or possibly scorn for narrative" makes the actions depicted in his compositions difficult to interpret without foreknowledge of the subject. The style is more reserved and chastened than Caravaggio's, the tone of color often quite bluish. Exceptional effects are attained by the precisely finished foregrounds, massed out largely in light and shade. Backgrounds are often featureless and dark. Zurbaran had difficulty painting deep space; when interior or exterior settings are represented, the effect is suggestive of theater backdrops on a shallow stage. The art historian Julián Gállego suggests that Zurbarán's early training "may have left him with a taste for Mannerist composition ... with the furniture and accessories placed on the slant" in an ambiguous space devoid of unitary perspective. The resulting contradictions have been compared to Cubism for the way each object is represented in isolation. According to José Camón Aznar, "Zurbarán succeeded in making a grace of his clumsiness".

Zurbarán's late works, such as the Saint Francis (c. 1658–1664; Alte Pinakothek) show the influence of Murillo and Titian in their looser brushwork and softer contrasts.

== Artistic legacy ==
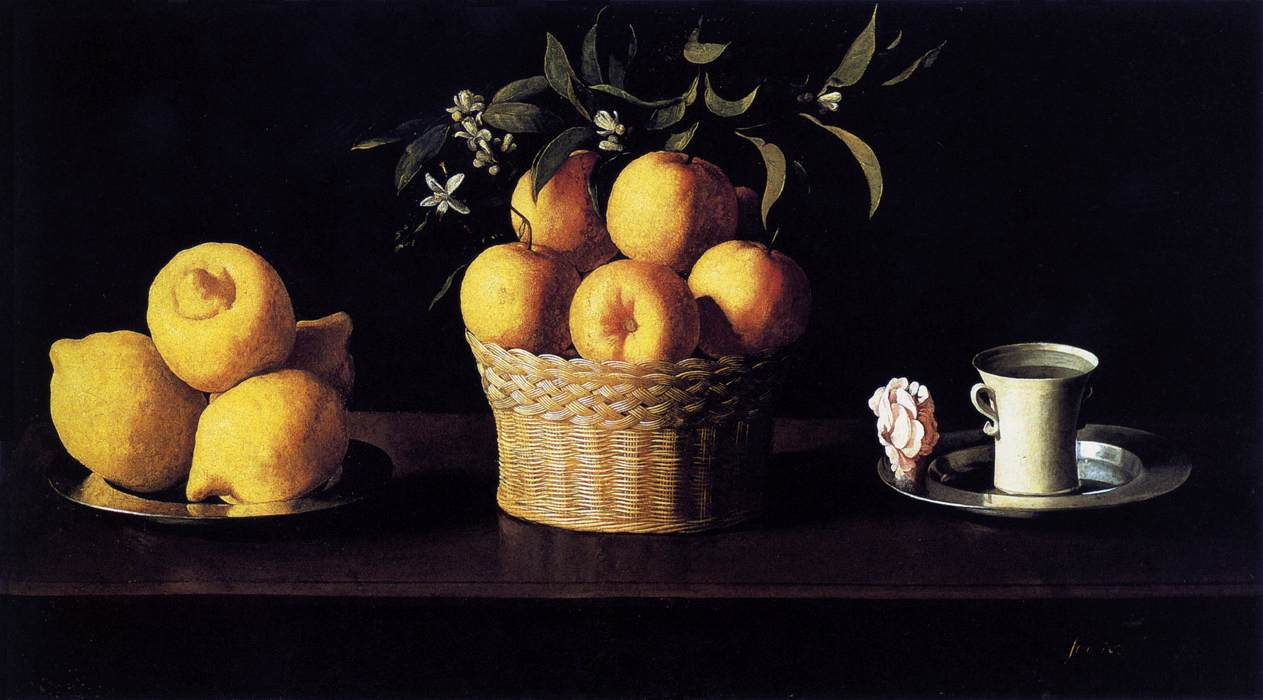
Still Life with Lemons, Oranges and a Rose, 1633, Norton Simon Museum, Pasadena, California

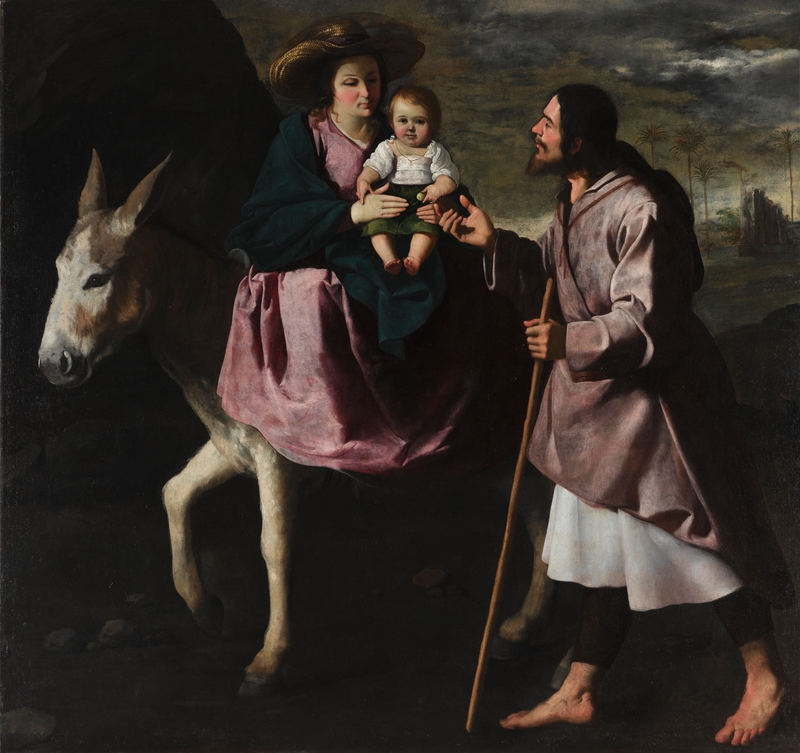
The Flight into Egypt, late 1630s, Seattle Art Museum

In 1631, he painted the great altarpiece of The Apotheosis of Saint Thomas Aquinas, now in the Museum of Fine Arts of Seville; it was executed for the church of the college of that saint. This is Zurbarán's largest composition, containing figures of Christ, the Madonna, various saints, Charles V with knights, and Archbishop Deza (founder of the college) with monks and servitors, all the principal personages being more than life-size. It had been preceded by numerous pictures for the retable of St. Peter in the cathedral of Seville.

Between 1628 and 1634, he painted four scenes from the life of St. Peter Nolasco for the Principal Monastery of the Calced Mercedarians in Seville. In Santa Maria de Guadalupe he painted multiple large pictures, eight of which relate to the history of St. Jerome; and in the church of Saint Paul, Seville, a figure of the Crucified Saviour, in grisaille, creating an illusion of marble. In 1639, he completed the paintings of the high altar of the Carthusians in Jerez. Also in the 1630s he was commissioned to provide canvases representing the Labours of Hercules, the only group of mythological subjects from the hand of Zurbarán, which were installed in the Hall of Realms in Madrid. A fine example of his work is in the National Gallery, London: a whole-length, life-sized figure of a kneeling Saint Francis holding a skull.

In 1835, paintings by Zurbarán were confiscated from monasteries and displayed in the new Museum of Cádiz.

His principal pupils were Bernabé de Ayala, Juan Caro de Tavira, and the Polanco brothers; others included Ignacio de Ries.

Zurbarán was the subject of a major exhibition in 1987 at the Metropolitan Museum of Art in New York, which traveled in 1988 to Galeries nationales du Grand Palais in Paris. In 2015, the Thyssen-Bornemisza Museum in Madrid presented Zurbarán. A New Perspective. In 2026, the National Gallery in London was expected to exhibit Zurbarán, the first major exhibit of his work in the United Kingdom.

In 2009, Odile Delenda assembled and published an authoritative catalogue raisonné of Zurbarán in two volumes. The first volume focuses on works believed to be painted primarily by Zurbarán himself, while the second volume catalogues paintings produced by his workshop, mostly for religious orders.

== Gallery ==
Select works in chronological order.

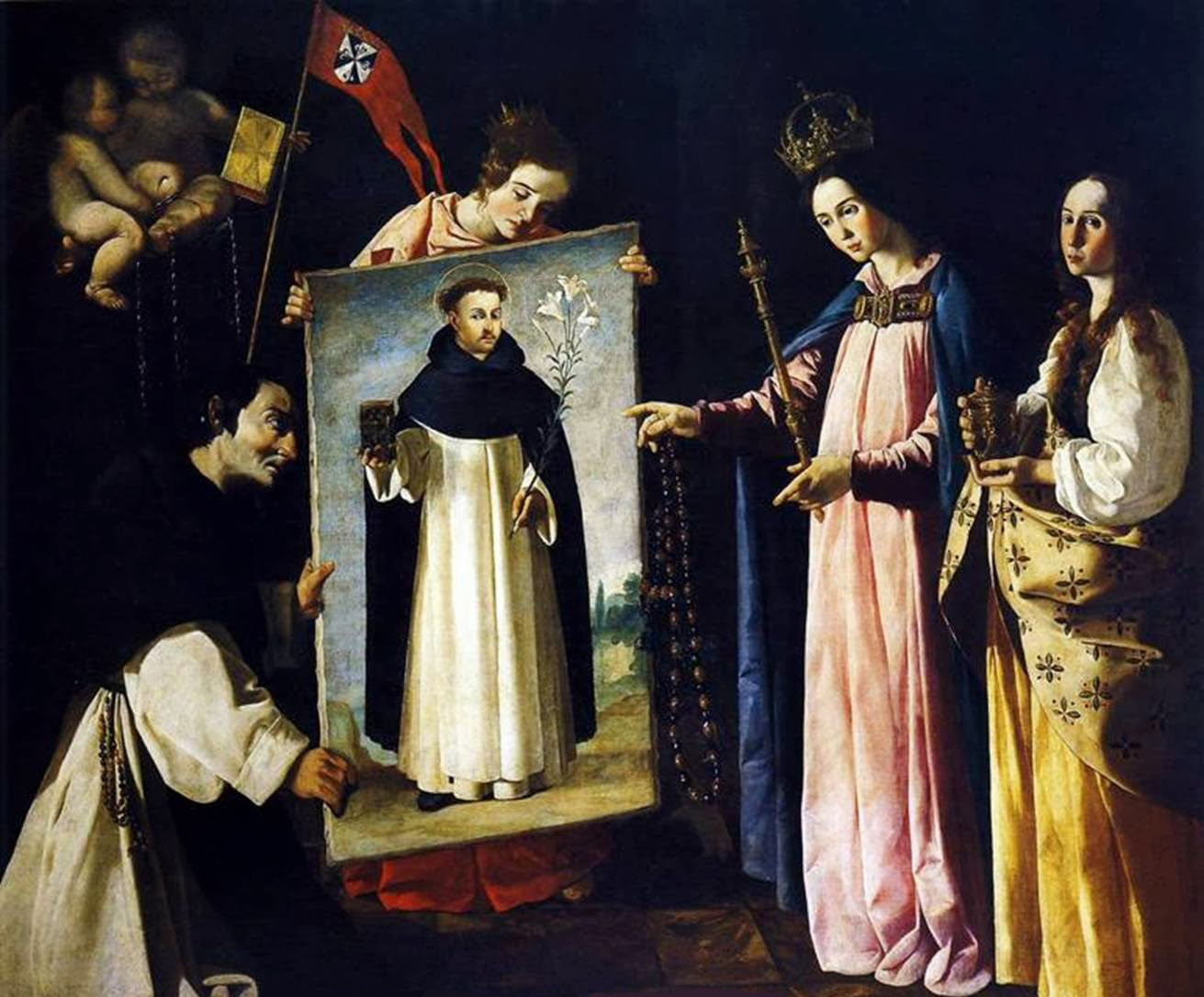
Santo Domingo en Soriano, 1626, Santa María Magdalena, Seville

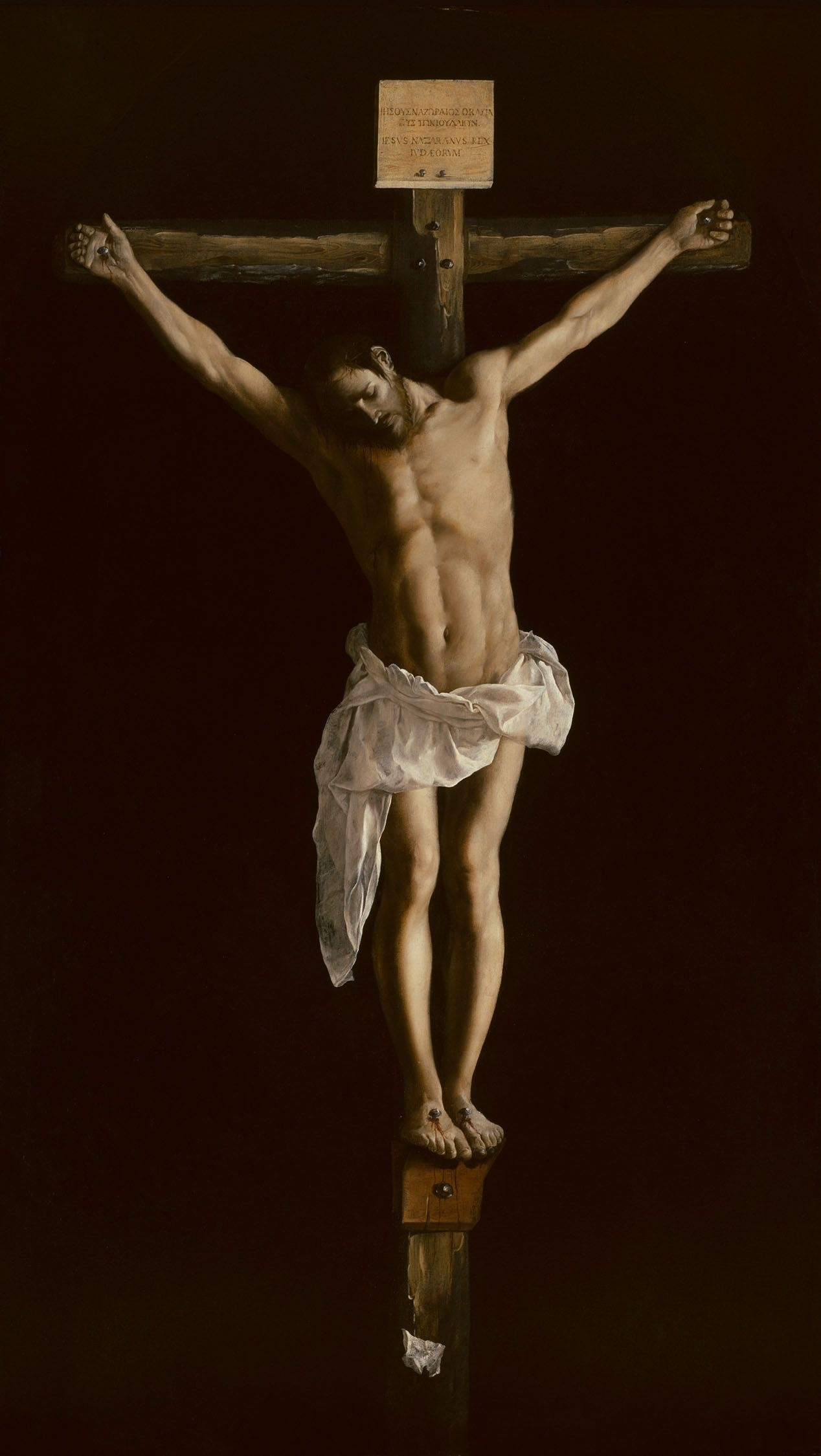
Christ on the Cross, 1627, Art Institute of Chicago

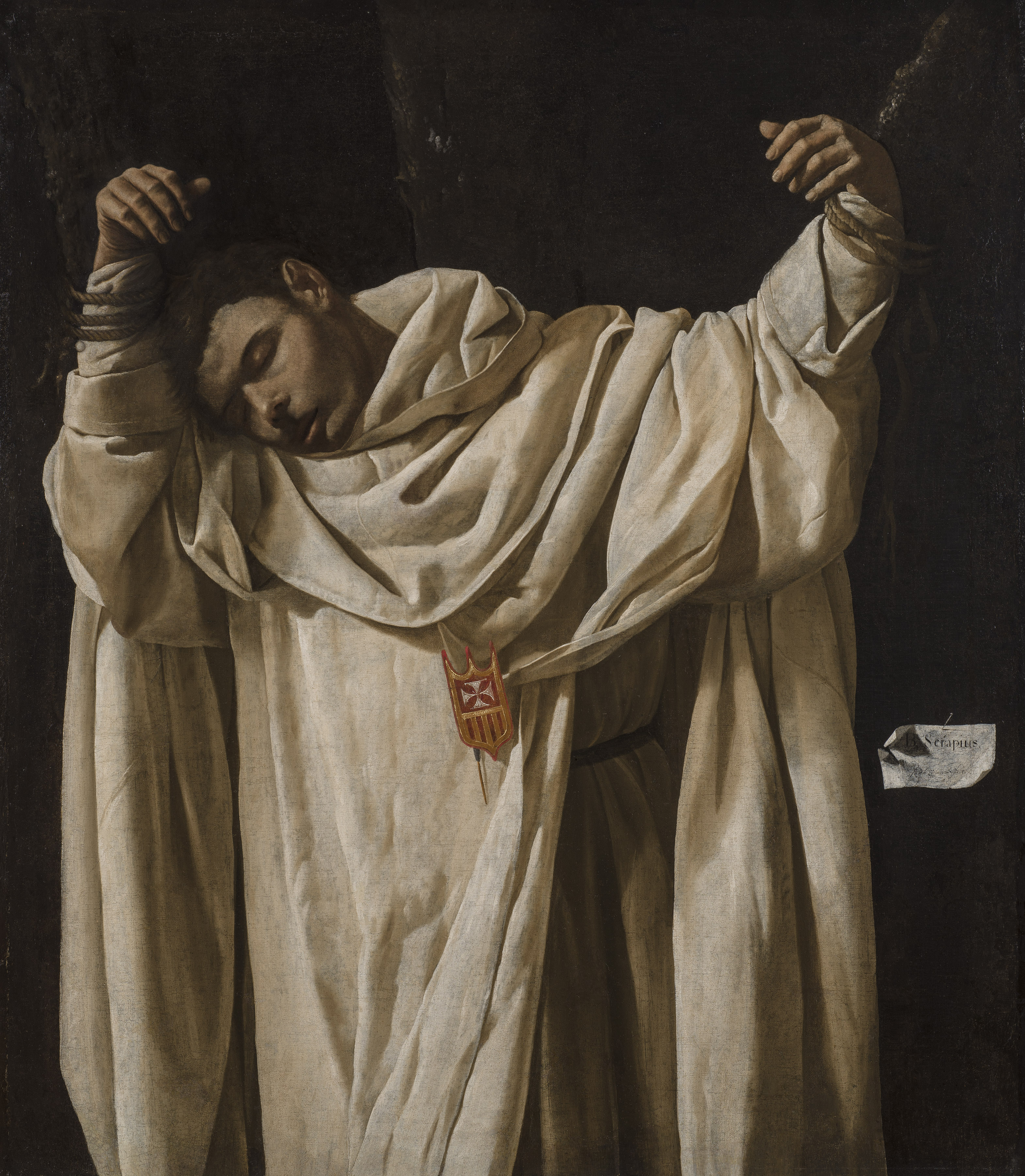
Saint Serapion, 1628, Wadsworth Atheneum, Hartford, Connecticut

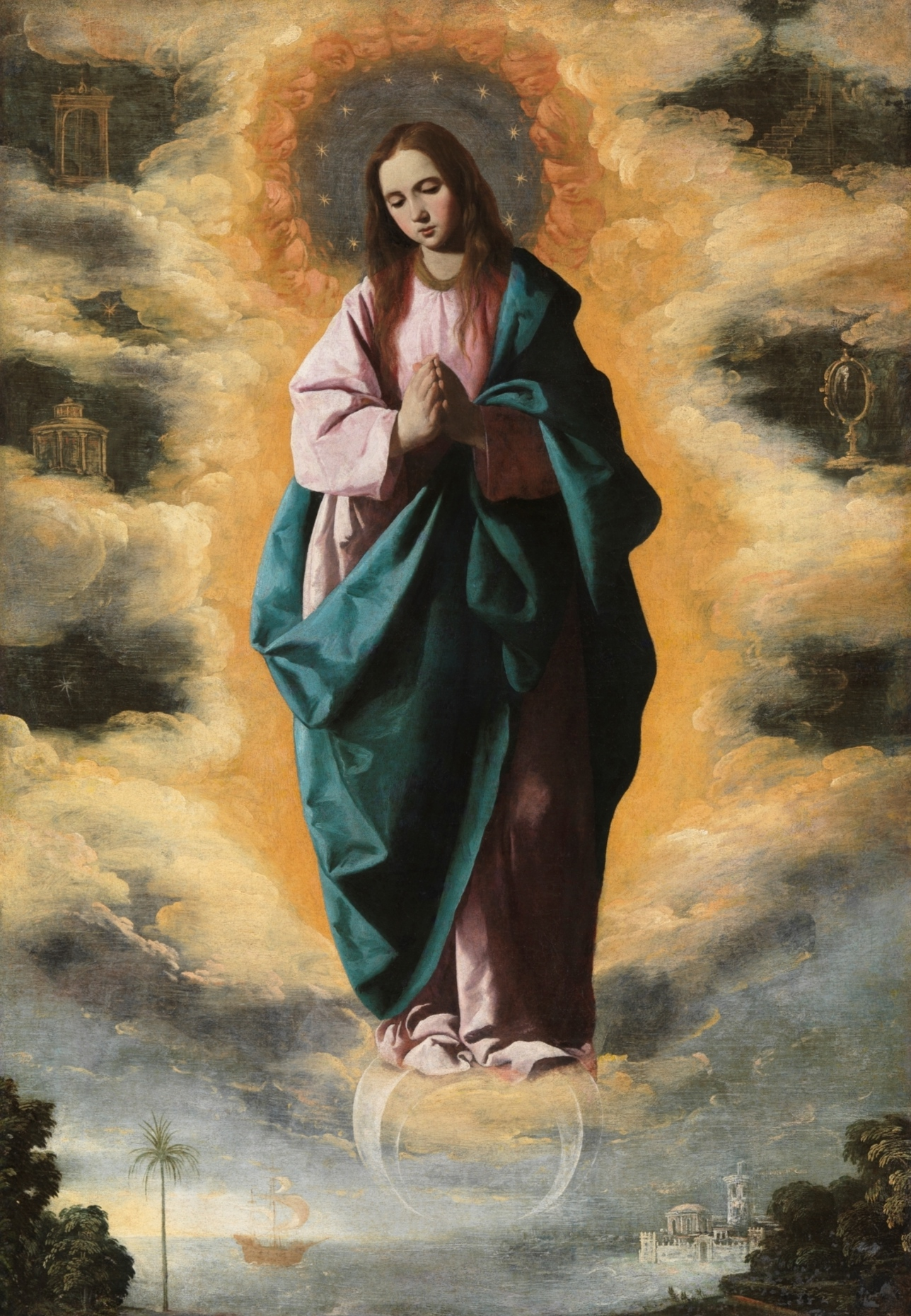
Immaculate Conception, 1630, Museo del Prado, Madrid

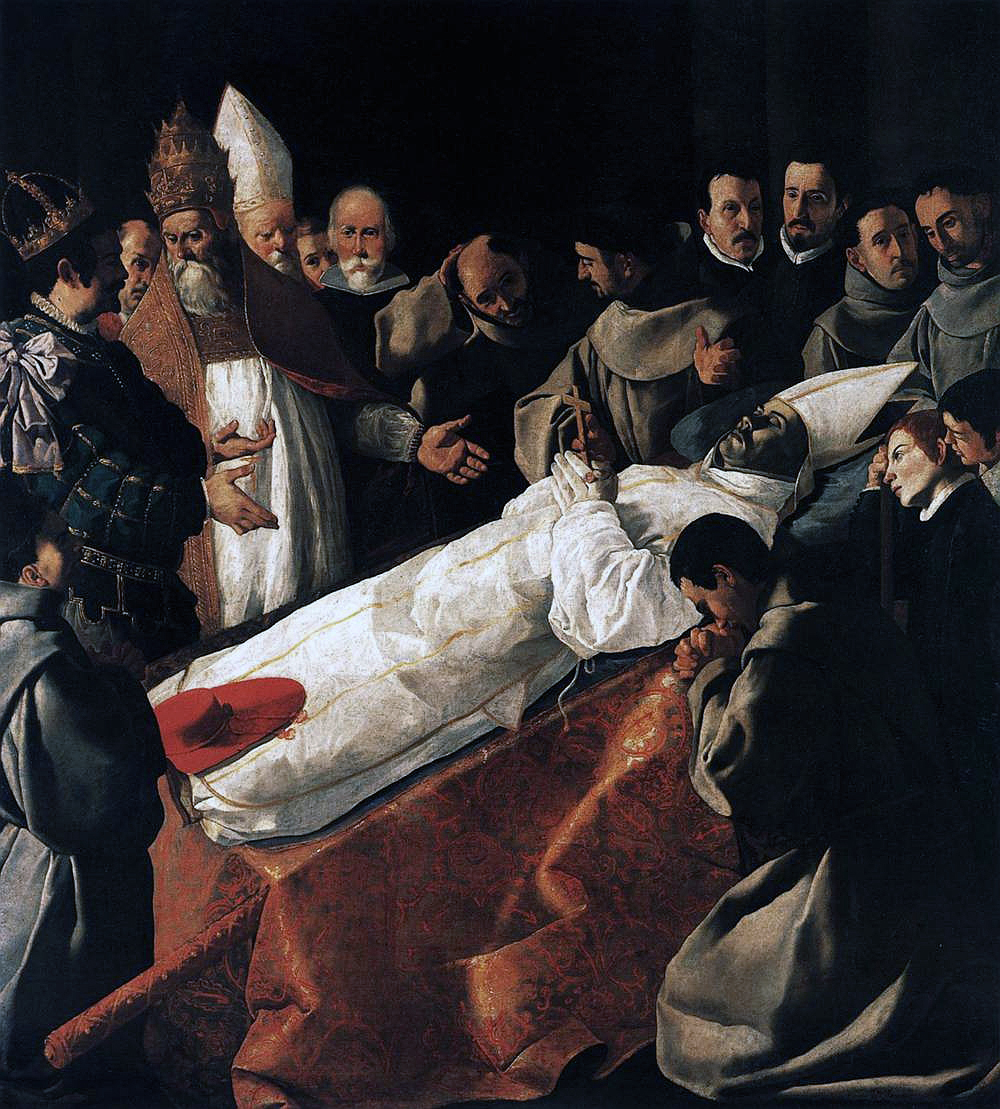
The Death of St. Bonaventure (The Body of St. Bonaventure in the Presence of Pope Gregory X and James I of Aragon), 1629–1630, Louvre Museum, Paris

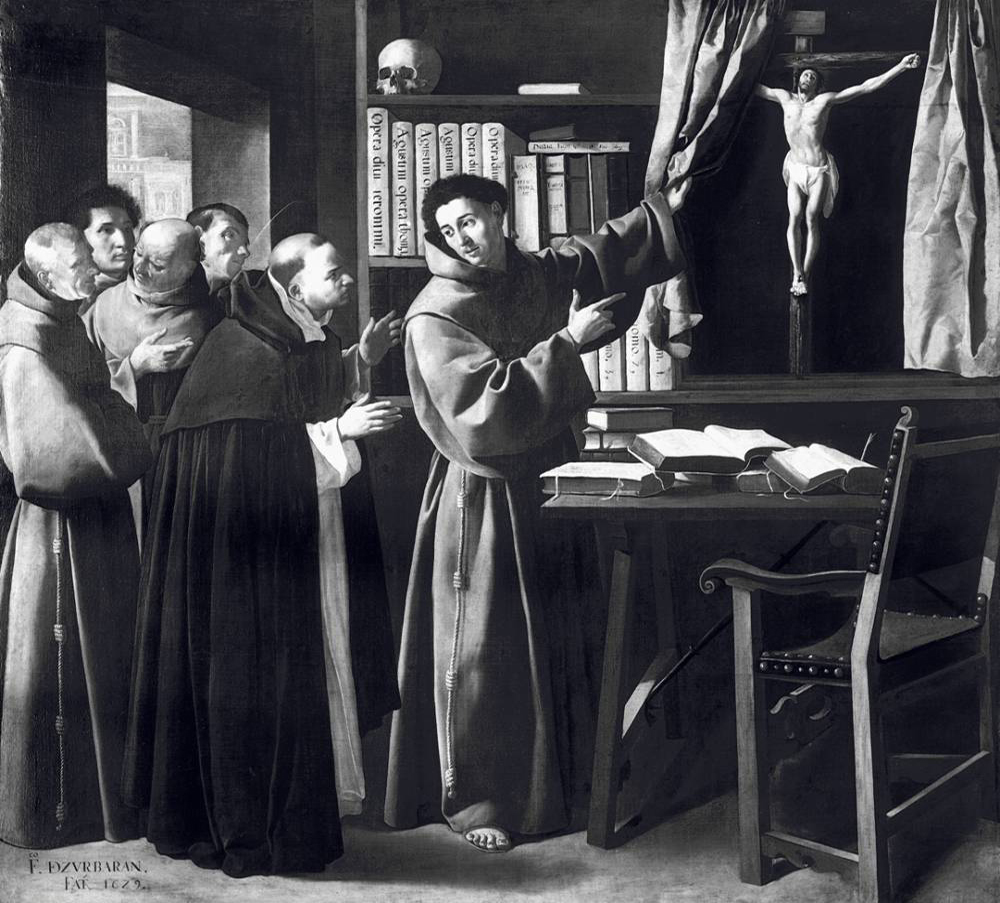
St. Bonaventure revealing the crucifix to St. Thomas Aquinas, 1629? destroyed 1945

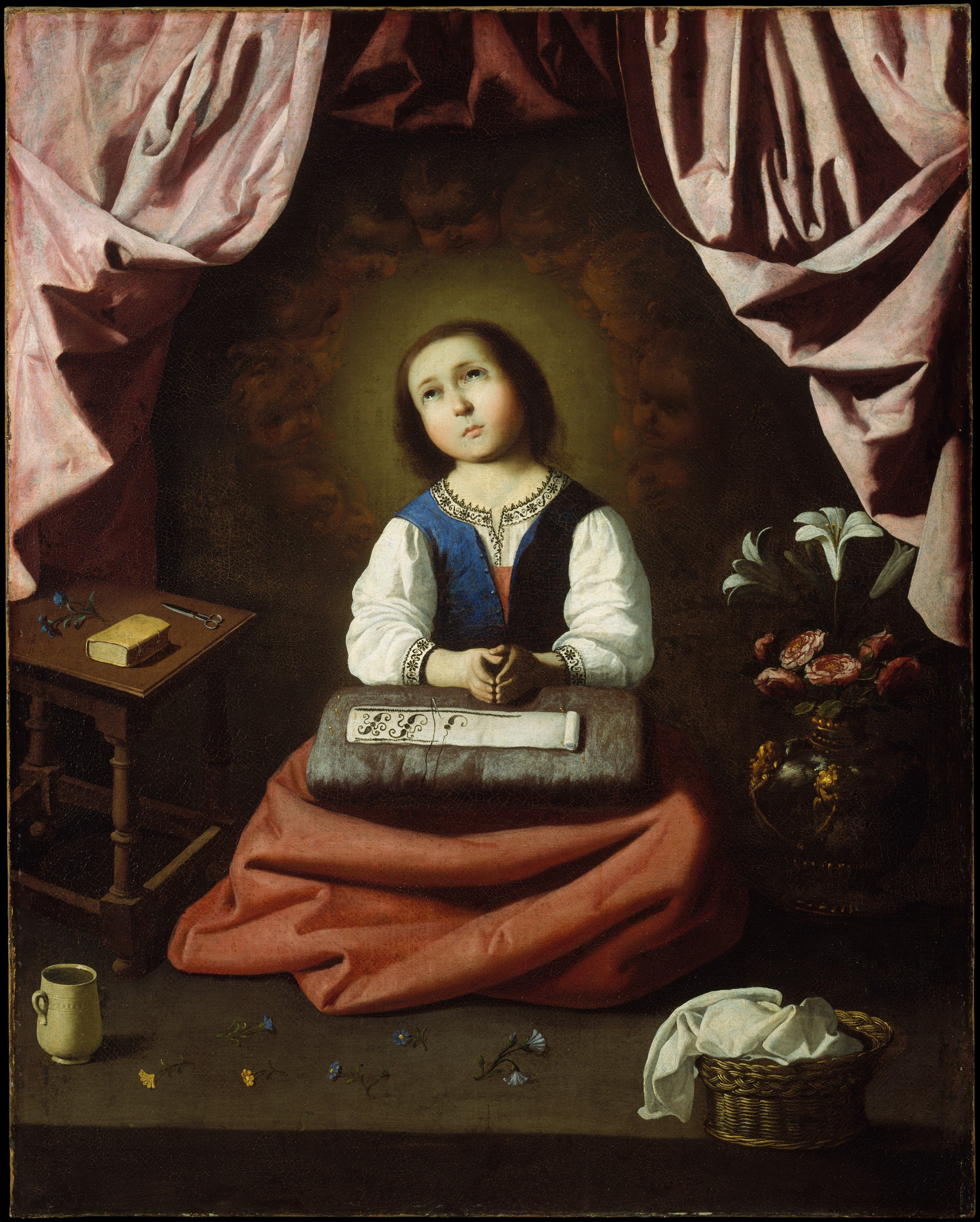
The Young Virgin, 1630, Metropolitan Museum of Art, New York

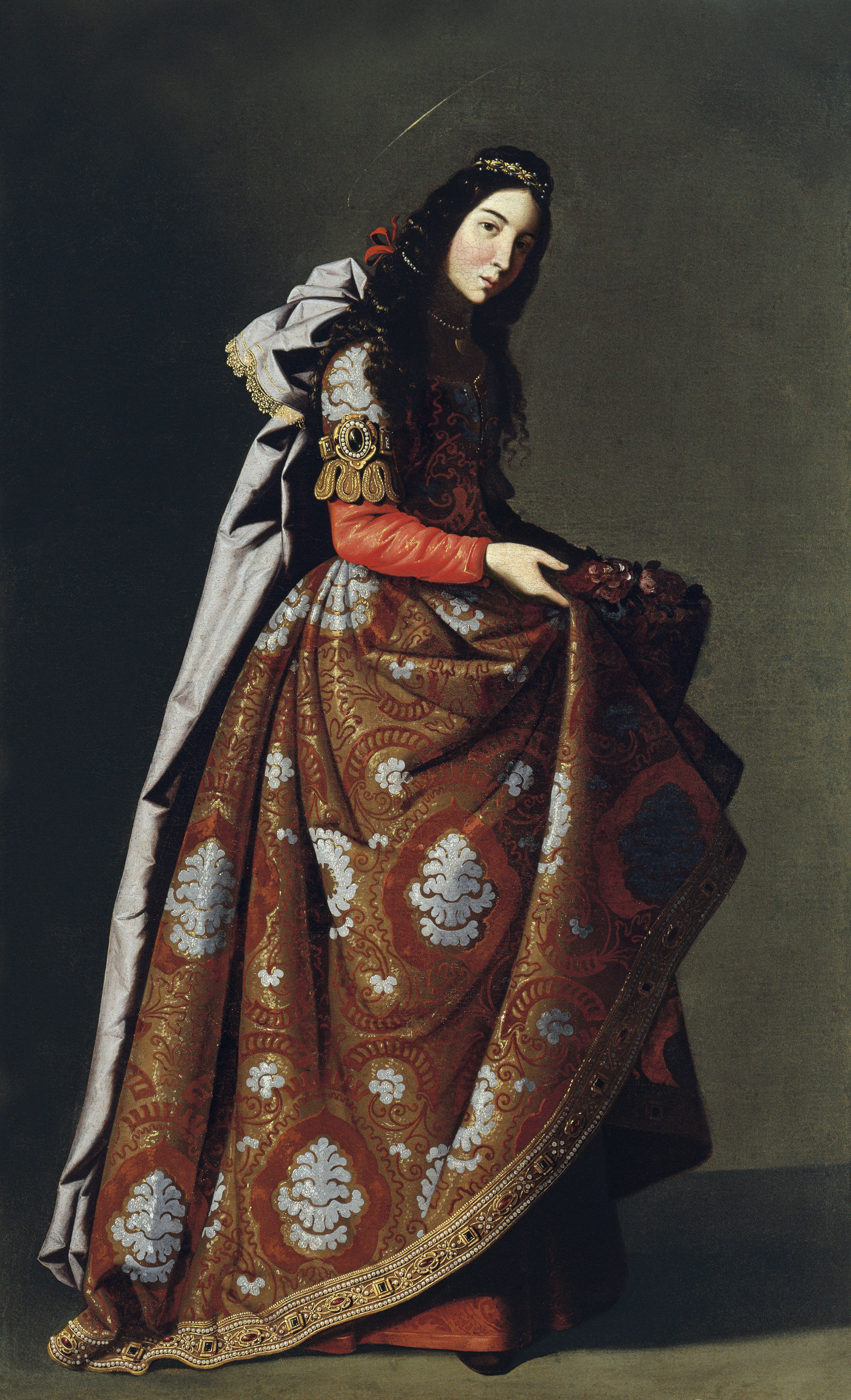
Saint Casilda of Toledo, 1630-1635, Thyssen-Bornemisza Museum, Madrid

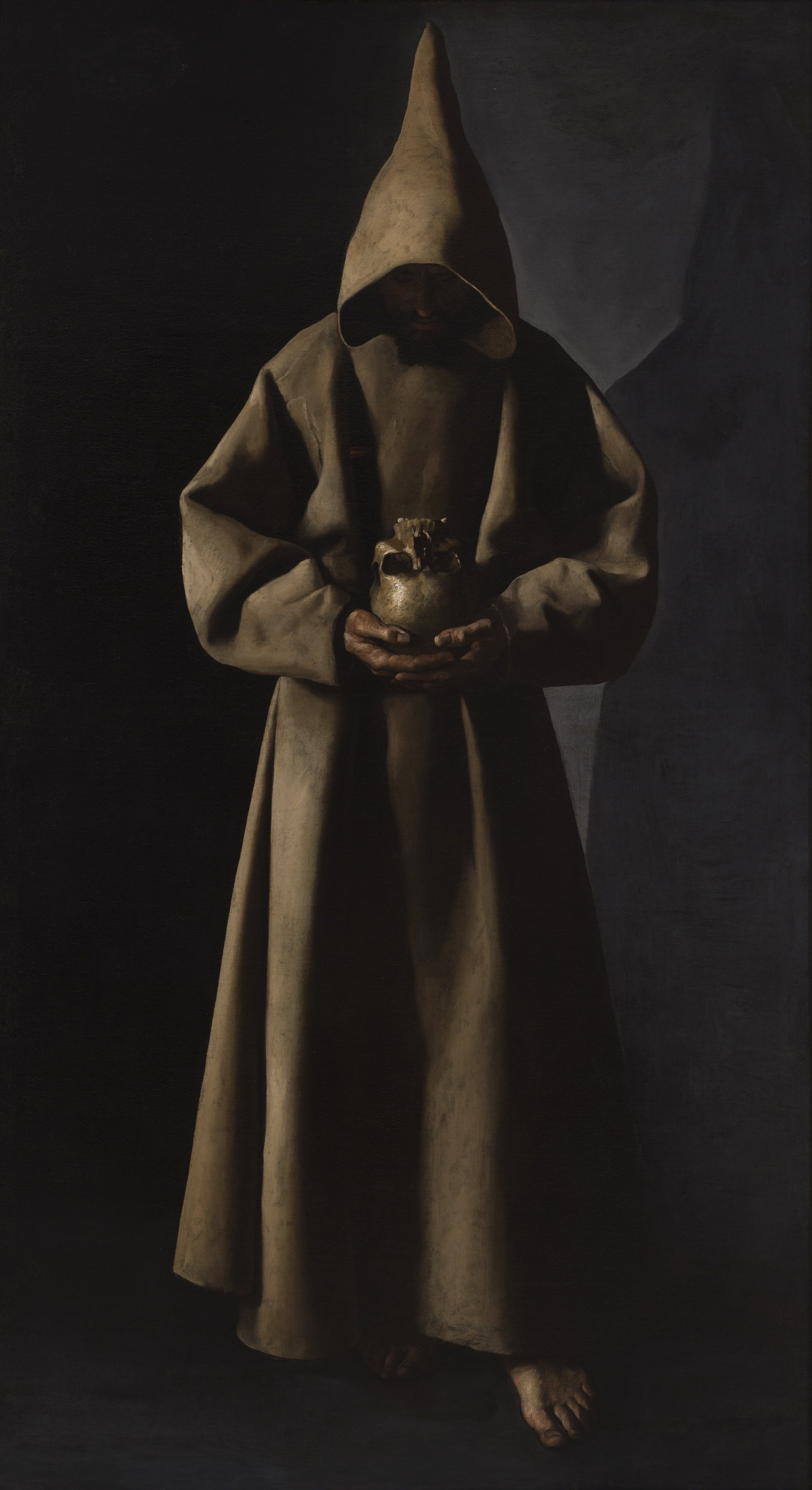
Saint Francis of Assisi in His Tomb, 1630–34, Milwaukee Art Museum, Milwaukee

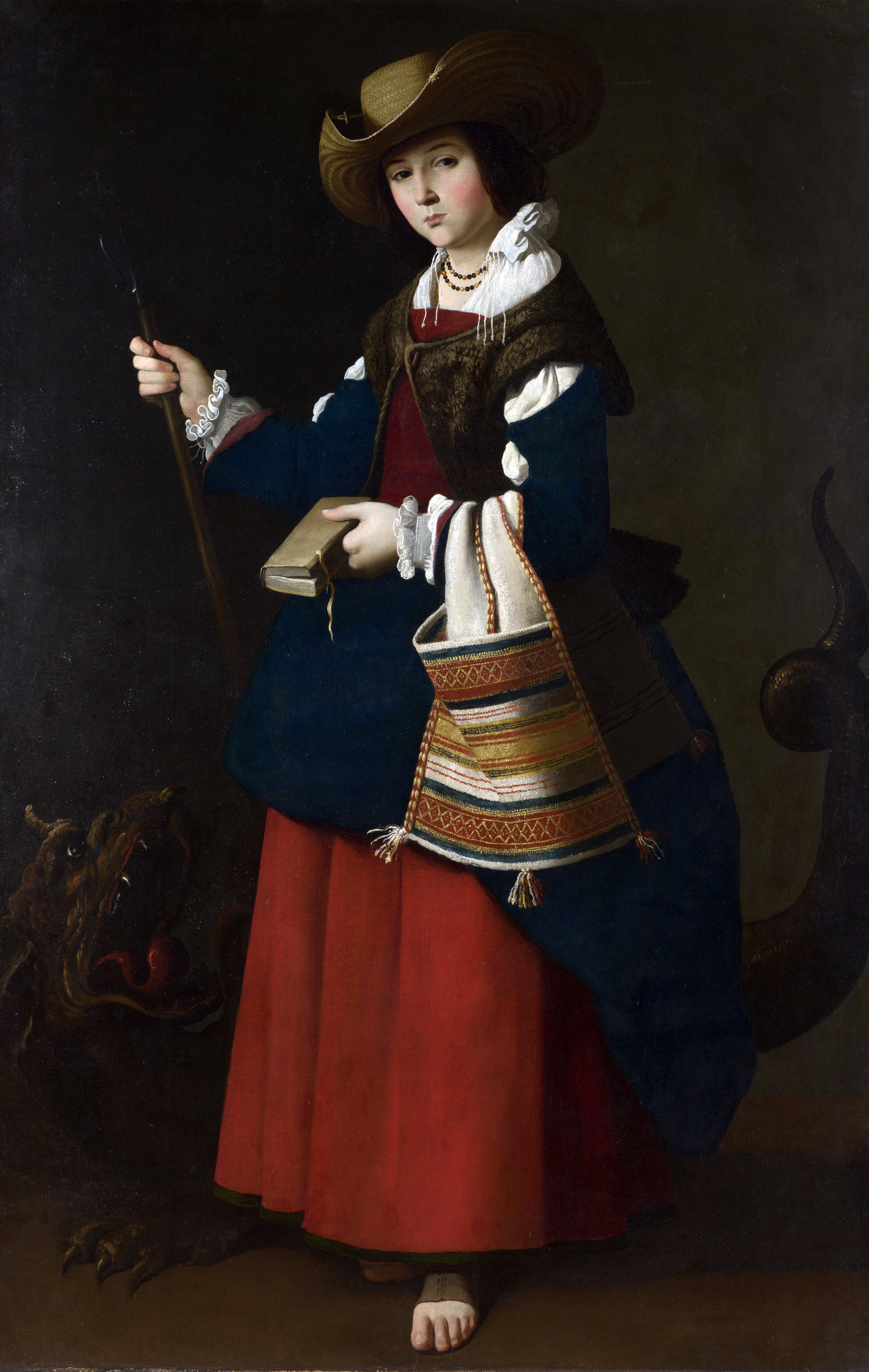
Saint Margaret as a shepherdess, 1631 National Gallery, London

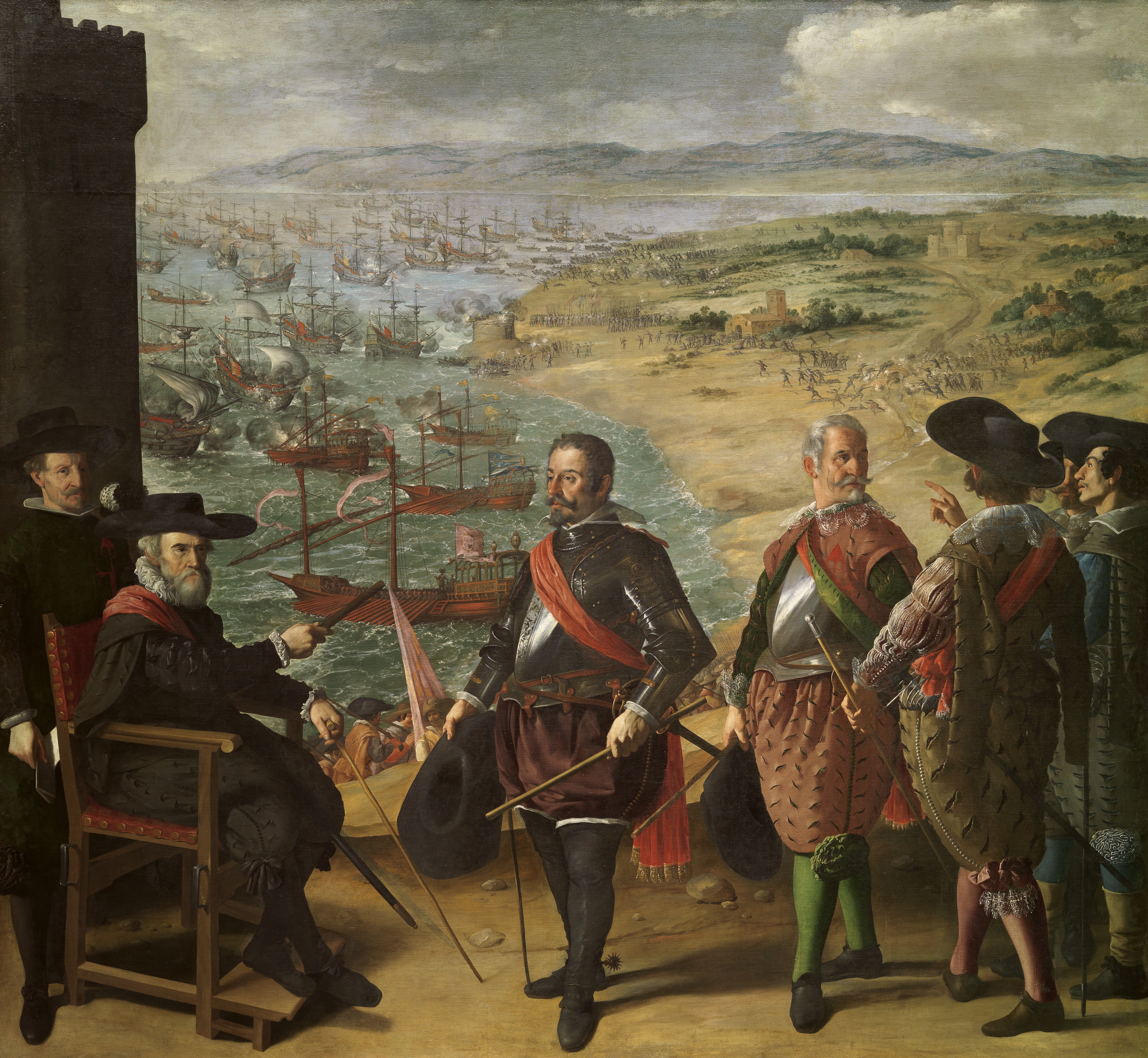
The Defence of Cádiz against the English, 1634, Museo del Prado, Madrid

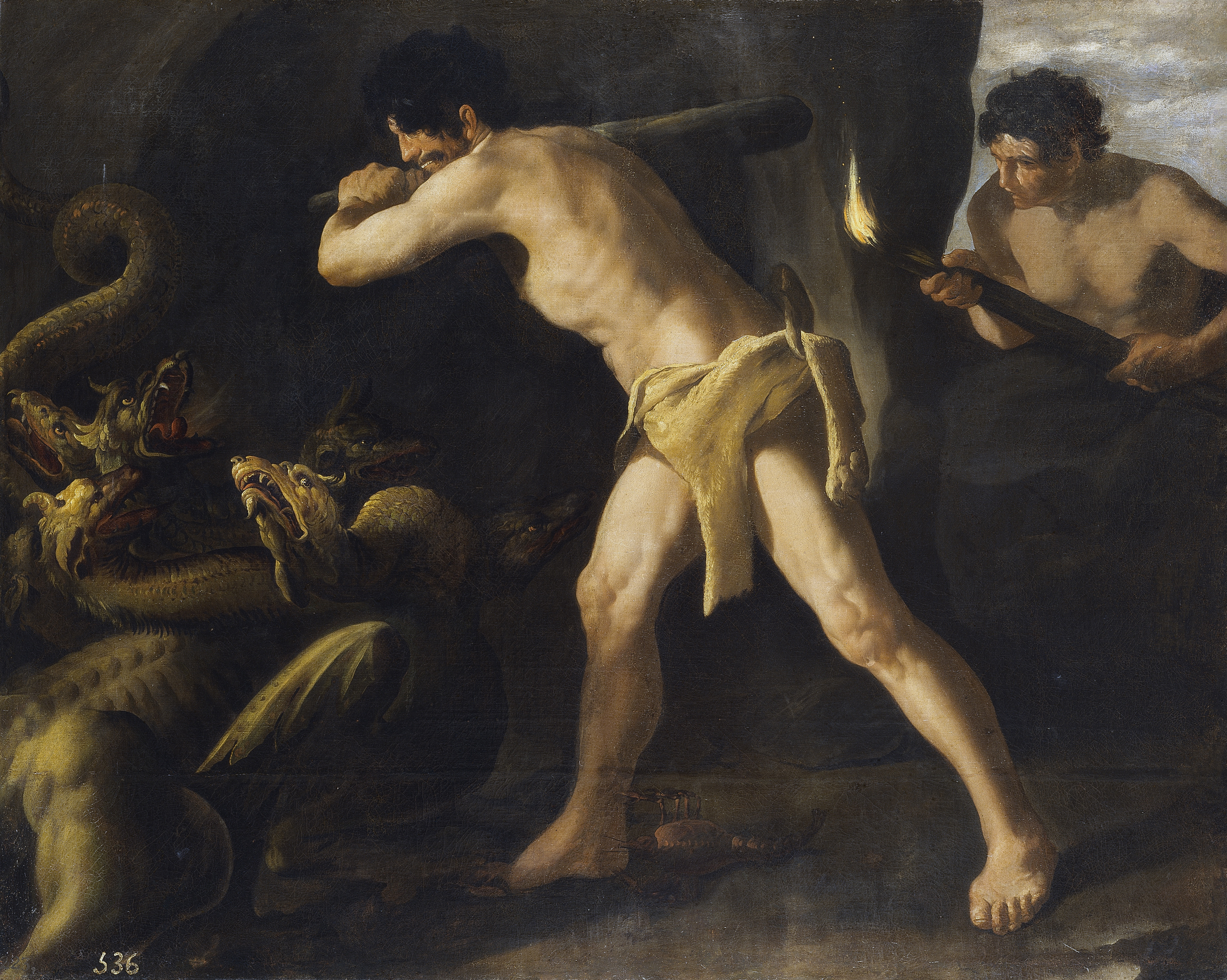
Hercules and the Hydra, 1634, Museo del Prado, Madrid

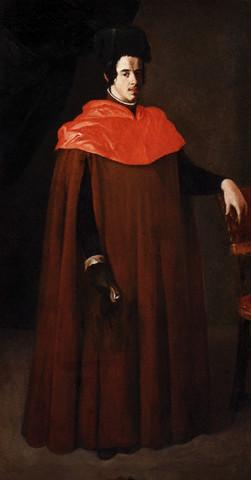
A Doctor of Law, 1635, Isabella Stewart Gardner Museum, Boston

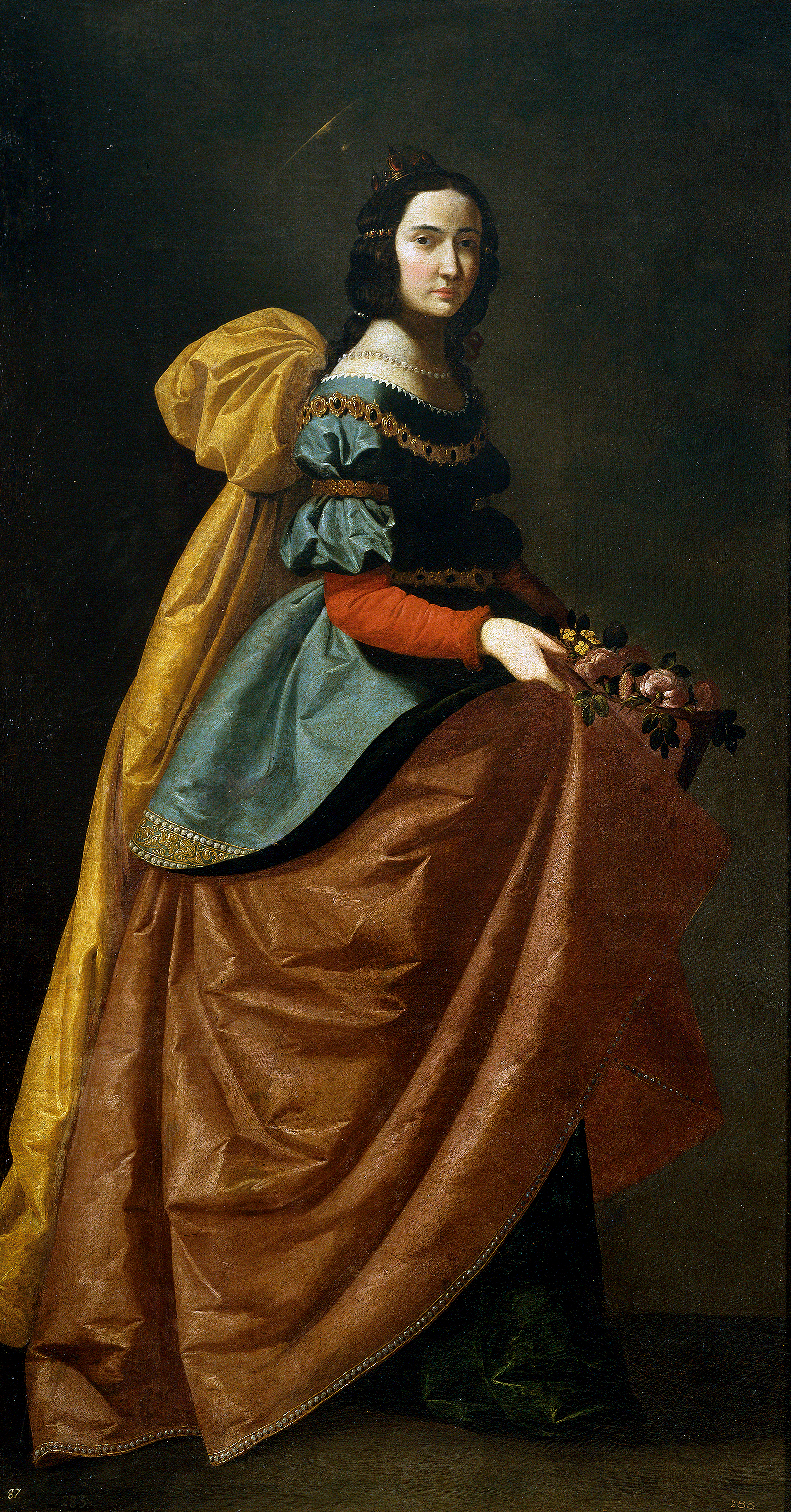
Saint Elizabeth of Portugal, c. 1635, Museo del Prado, Madrid

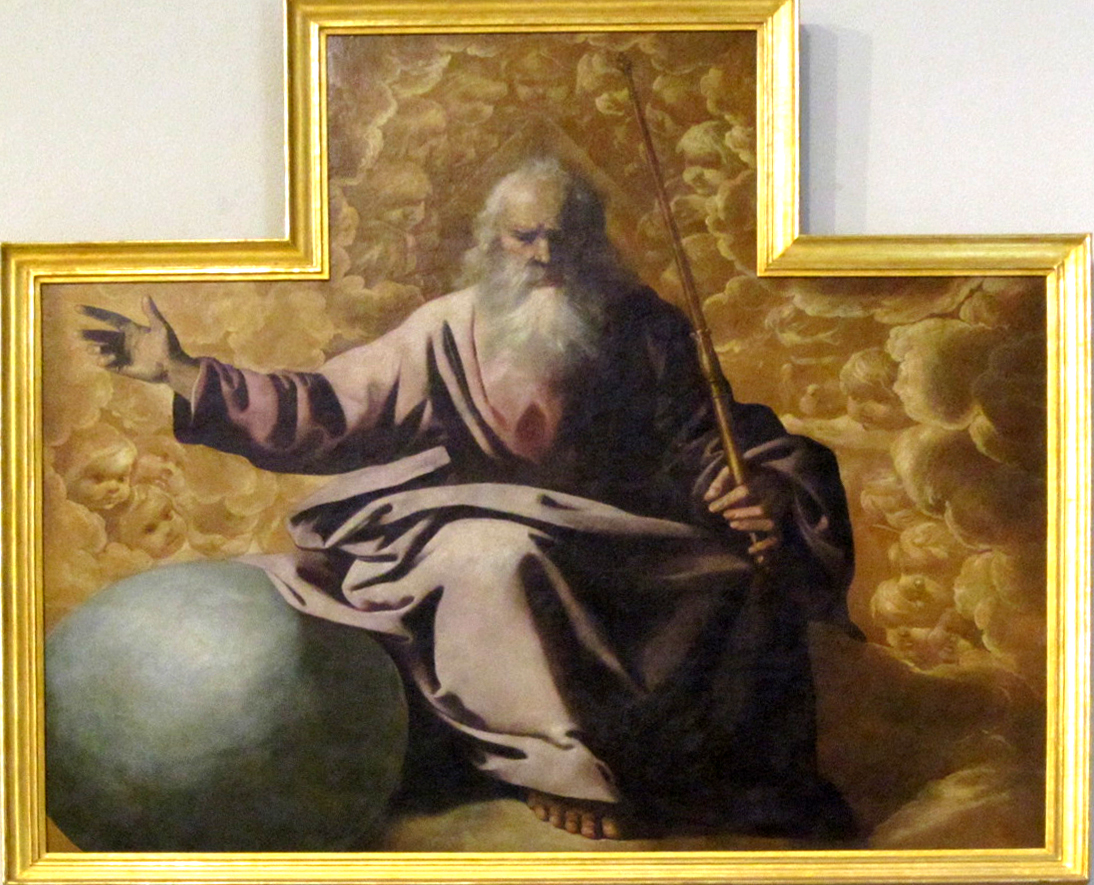
Eternal Father, 1636, Museum of Fine Arts of Seville

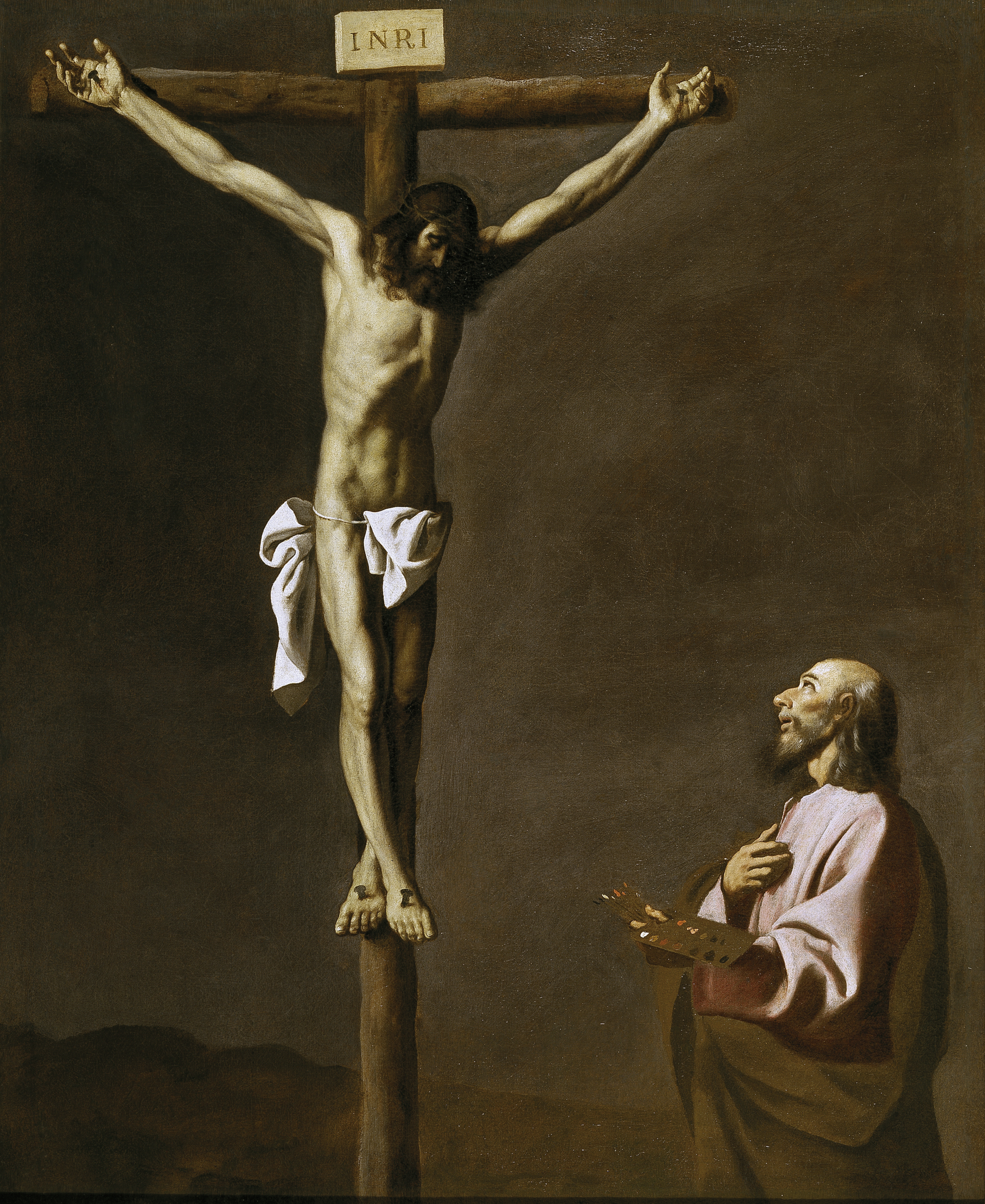
Saint Luke as a Painter before Christ on the Cross, c. 1635–1640, Museo del Prado, Madrid

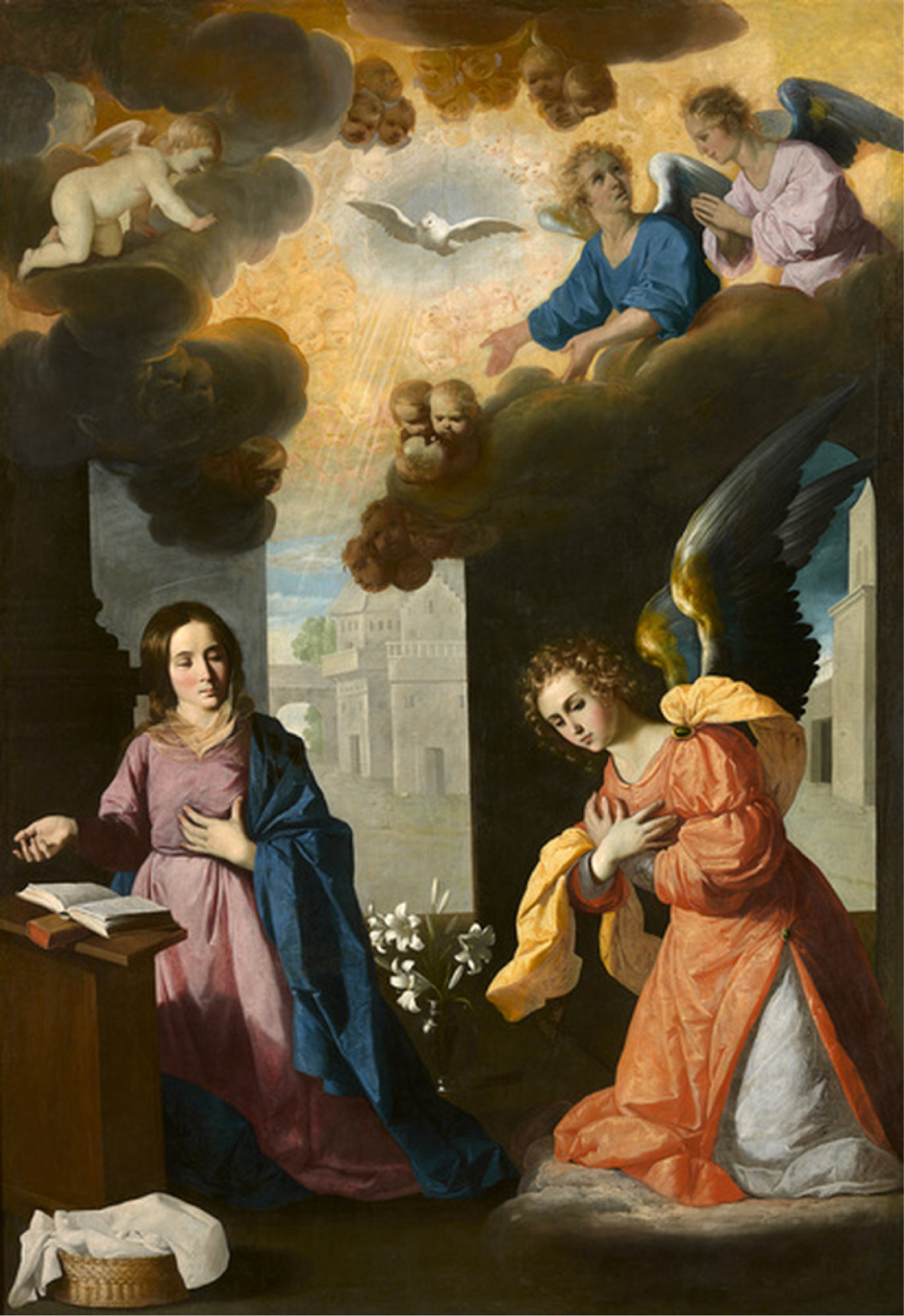
The Annunciation, 1637–1639, Museum of Grenoble, France

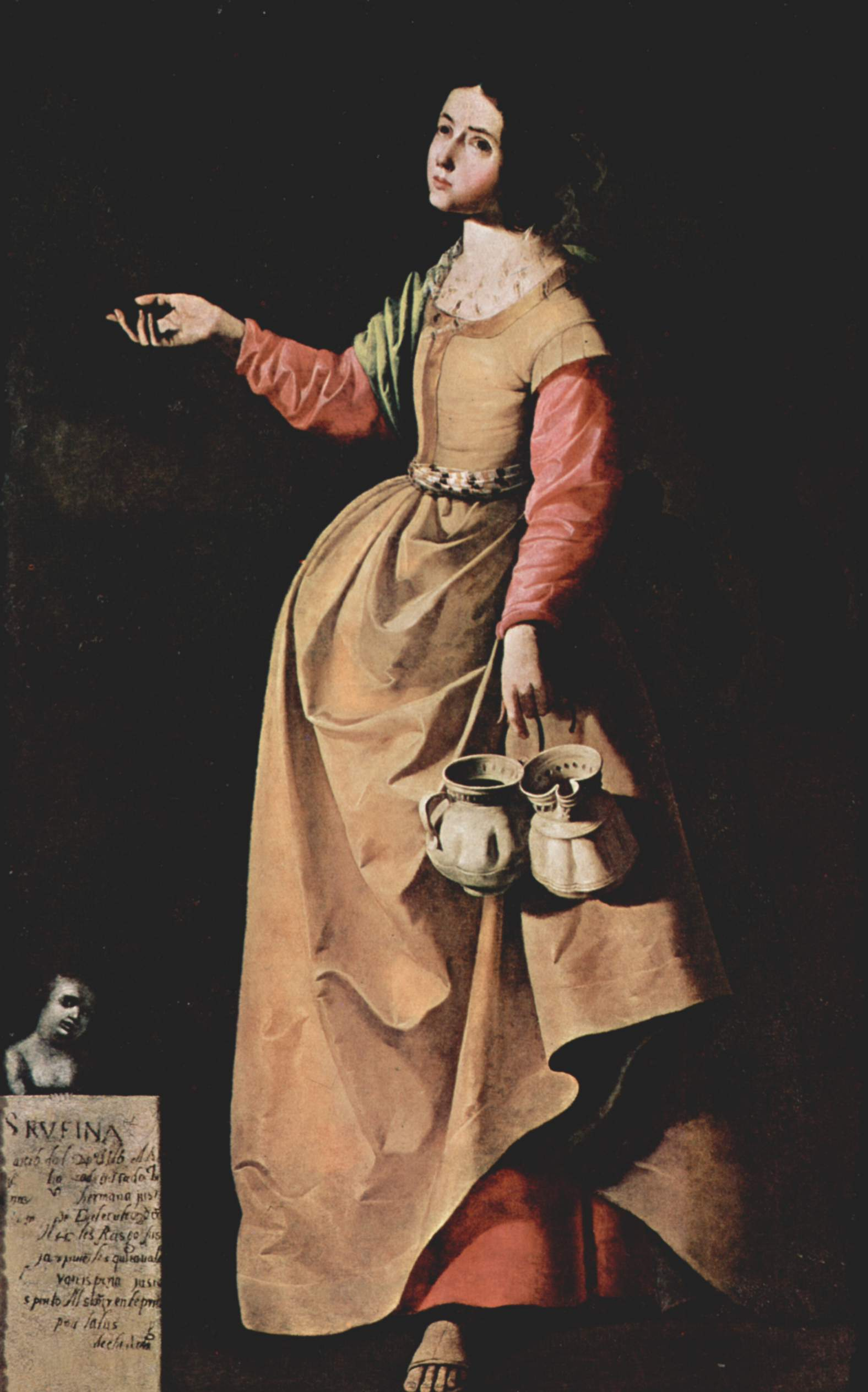
Saint Rufina, c. 1635–1640, National Gallery of Ireland, Dublin

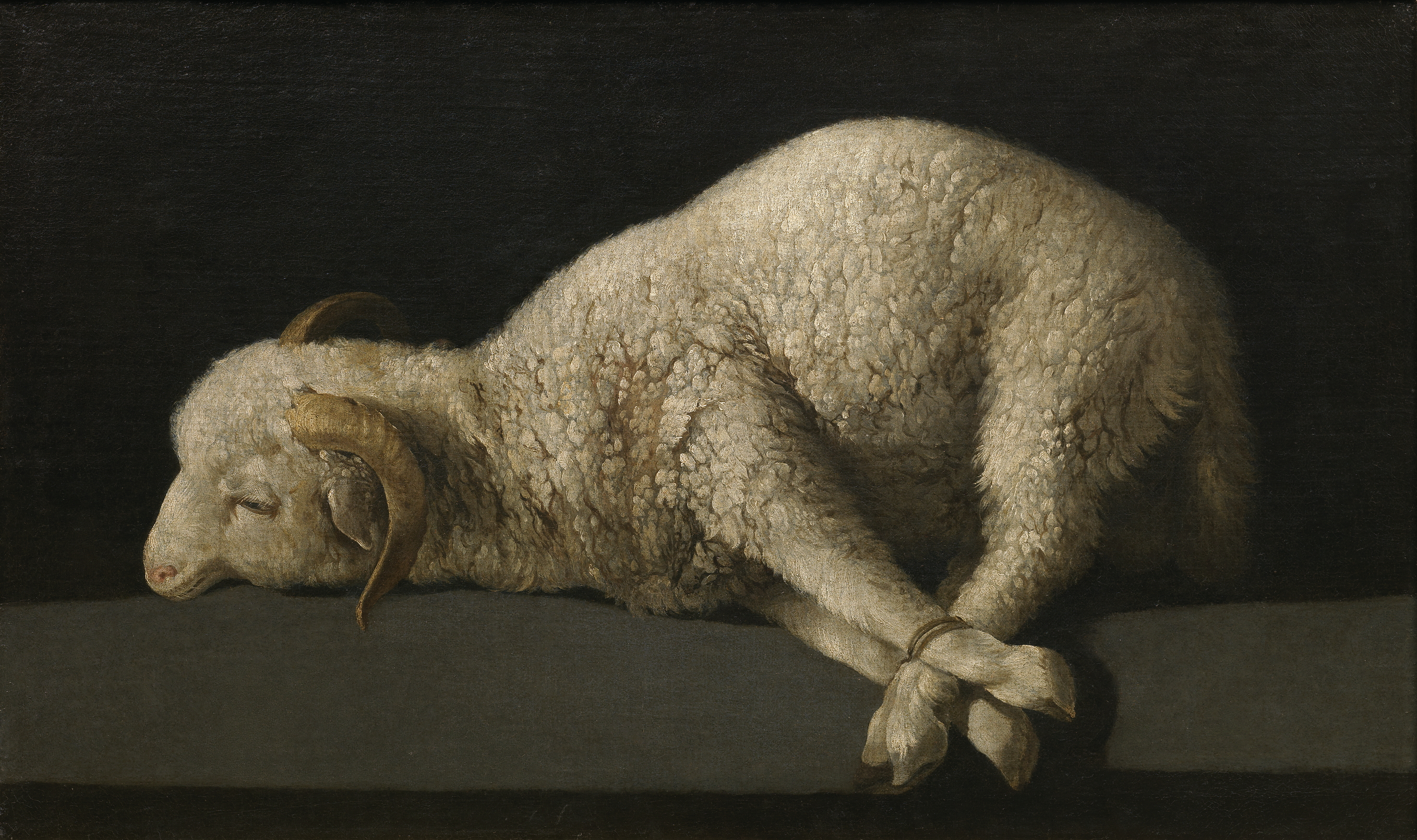
Agnus Dei, c. 1635–1640, Museo del Prado, Madrid

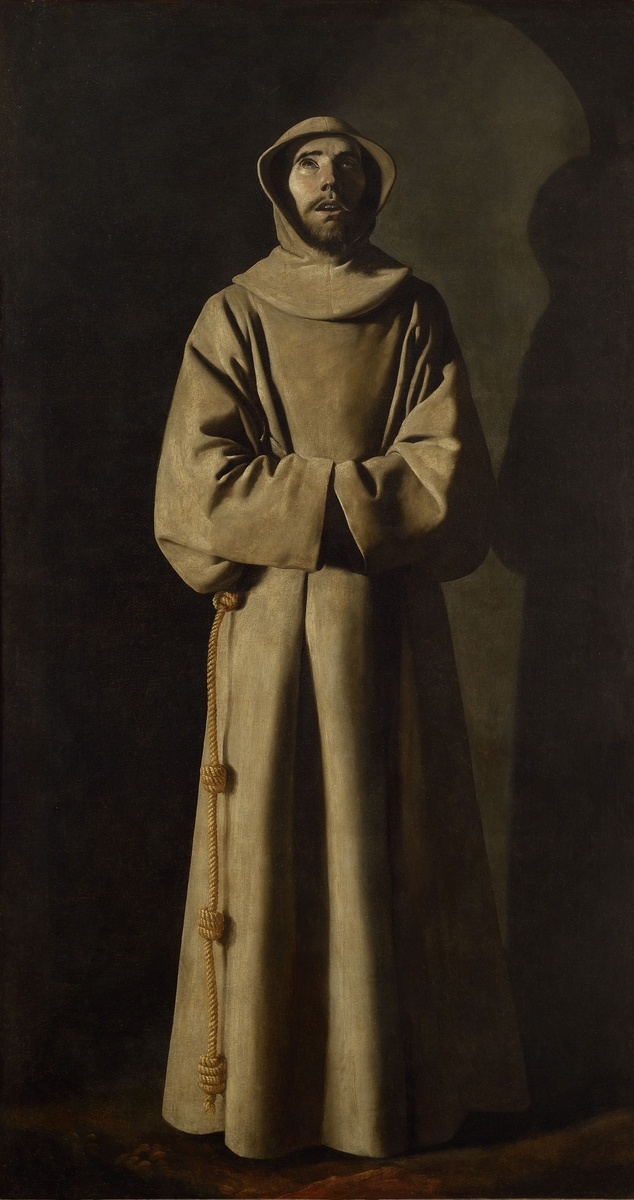
Saint Francis of Assisi, c. 1631–1640, Museum of Fine Arts of Lyon

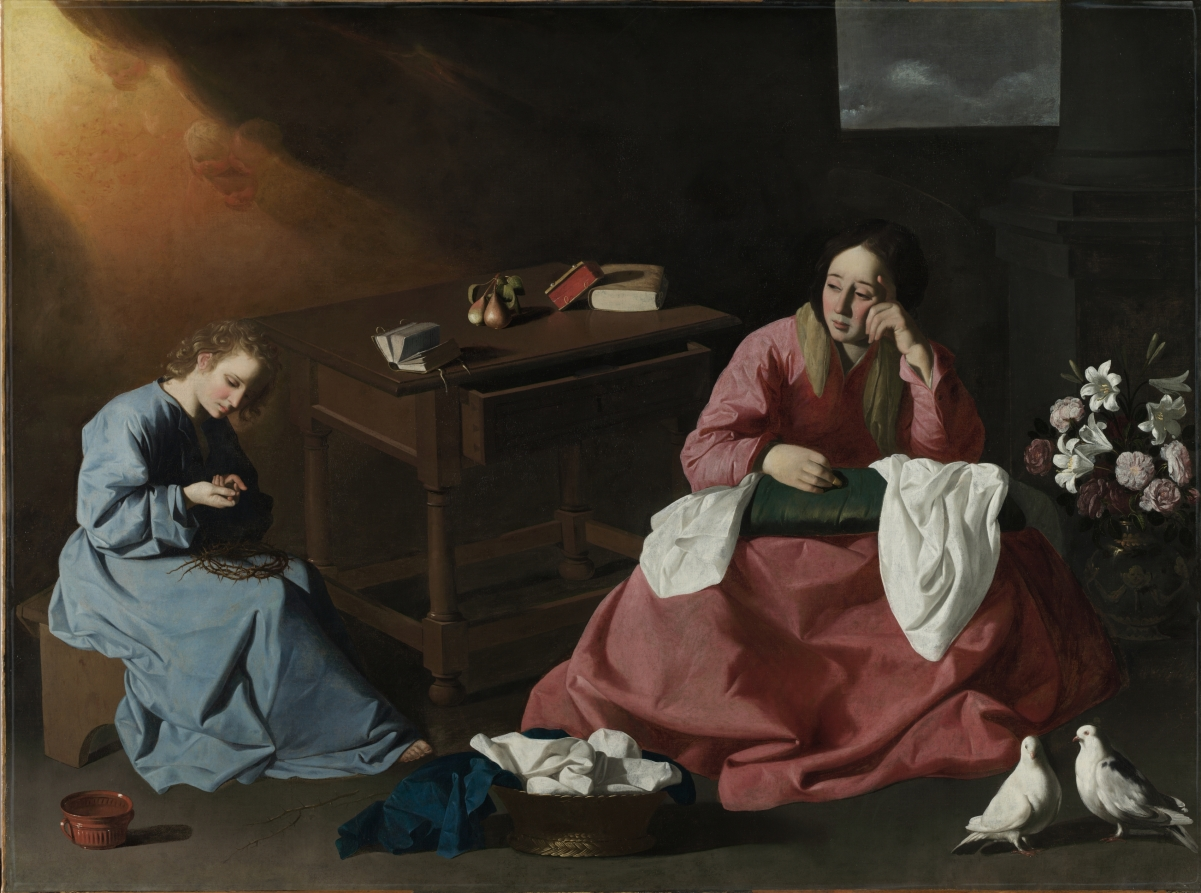
Christ and the Virgin in the House at Nazareth,
c. 1631–1640,
Cleveland Museum of Art

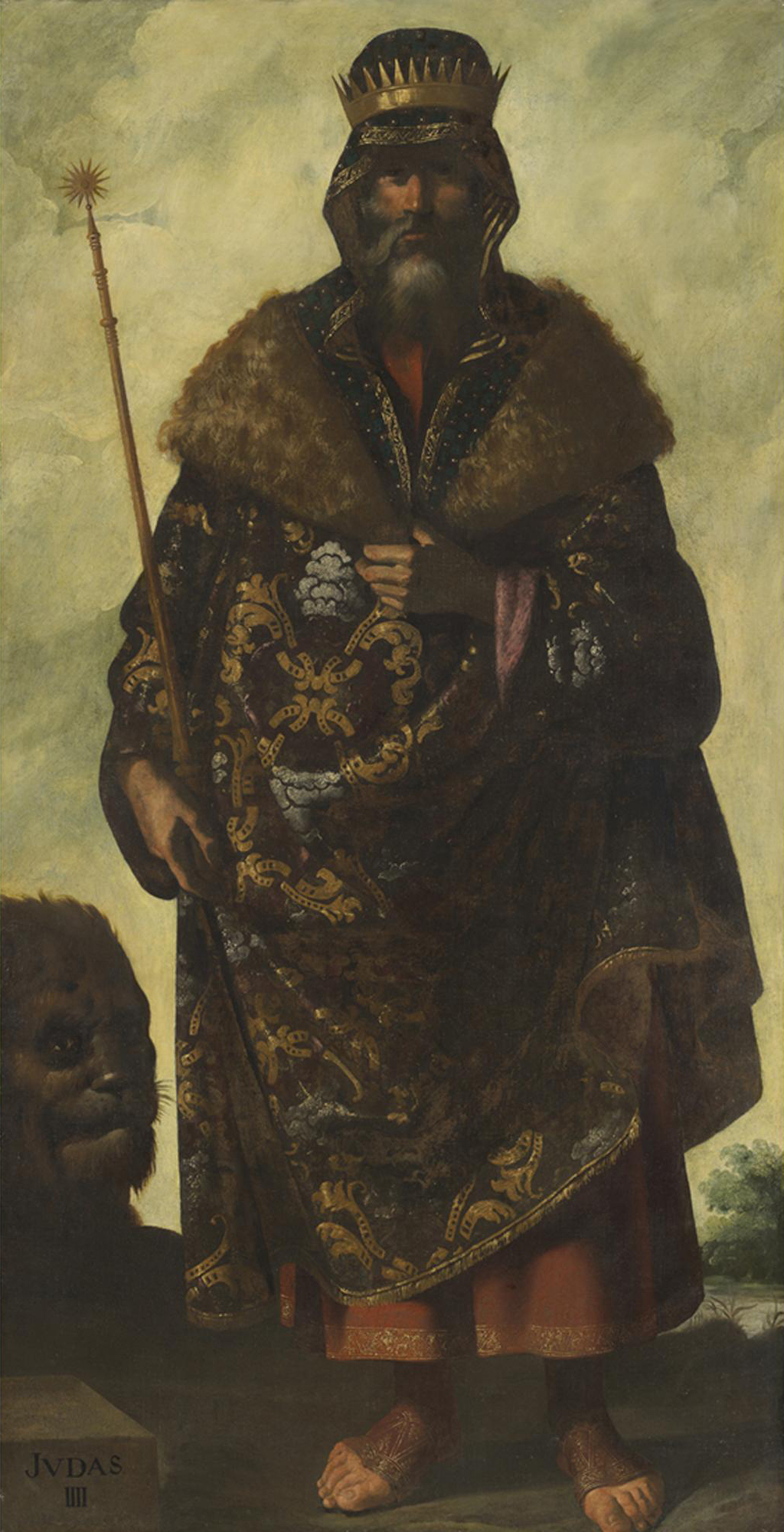
Judah, 1645

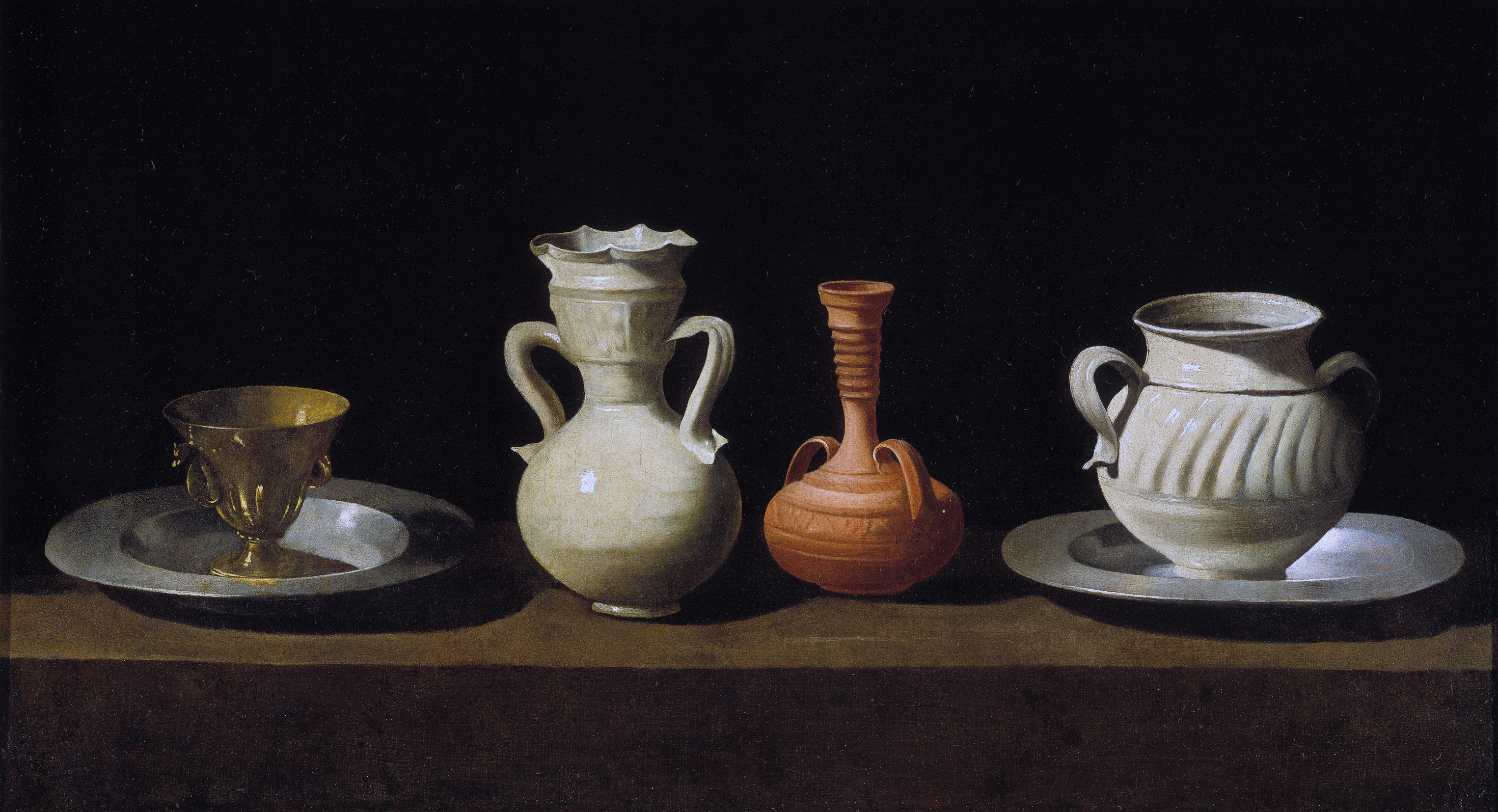
Still Life with Pots, c. 1650, Museo del Prado, Madrid

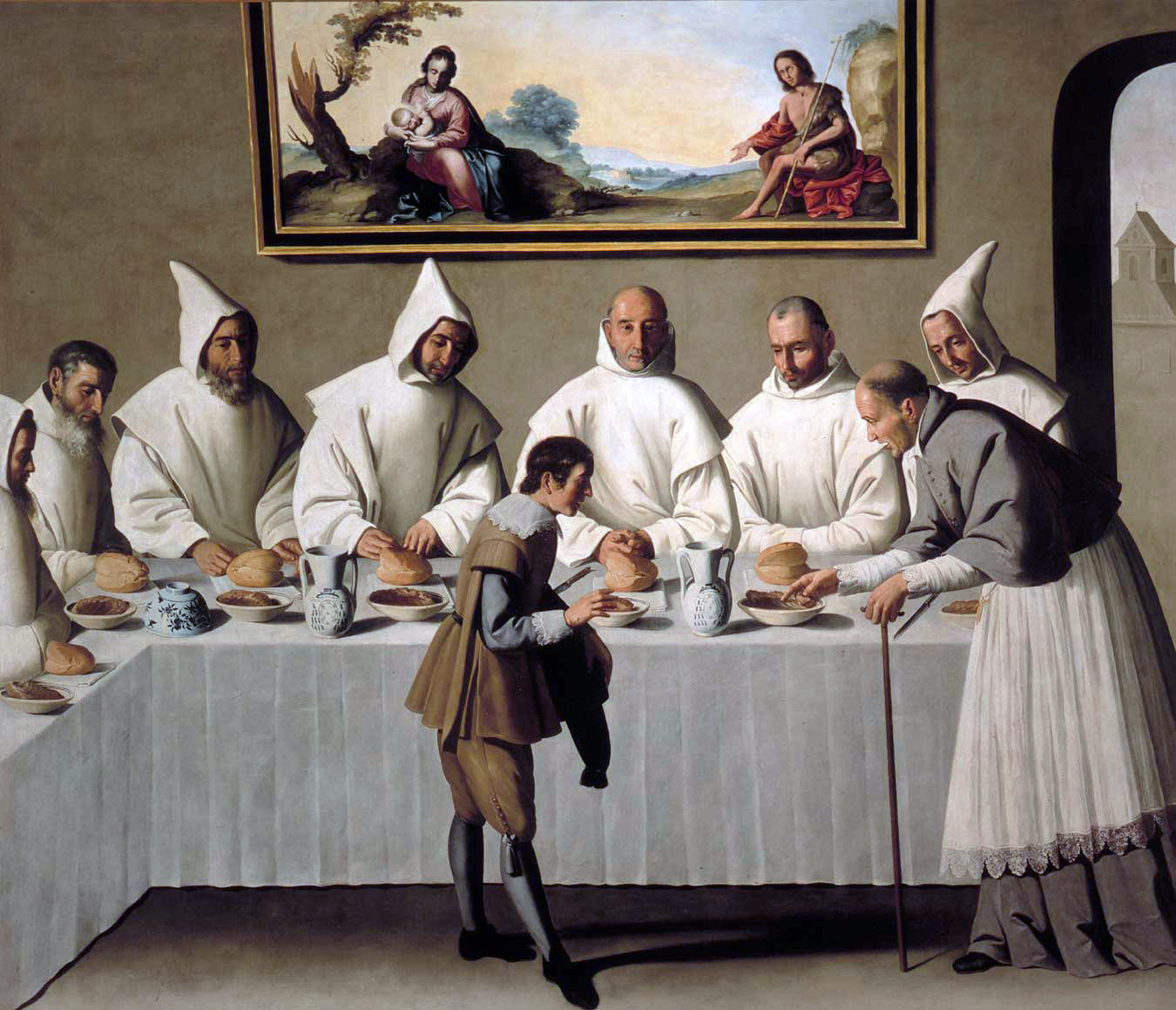
St Hugh in the Carthusian Refectory, c. 1655, Museum of Fine Arts of Seville

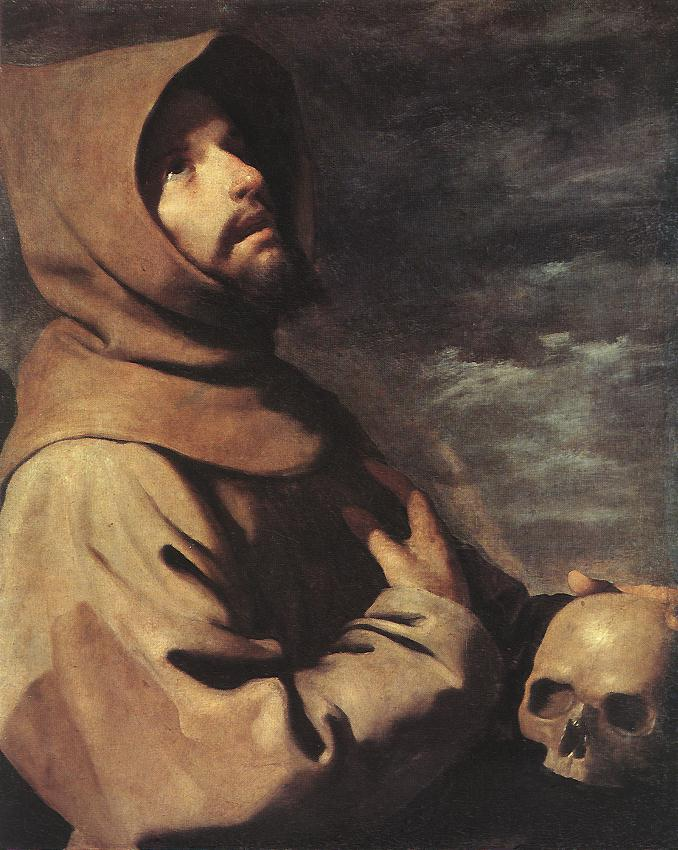
Saint Francis, c. 1658–1664, Alte Pinakothek, Munich

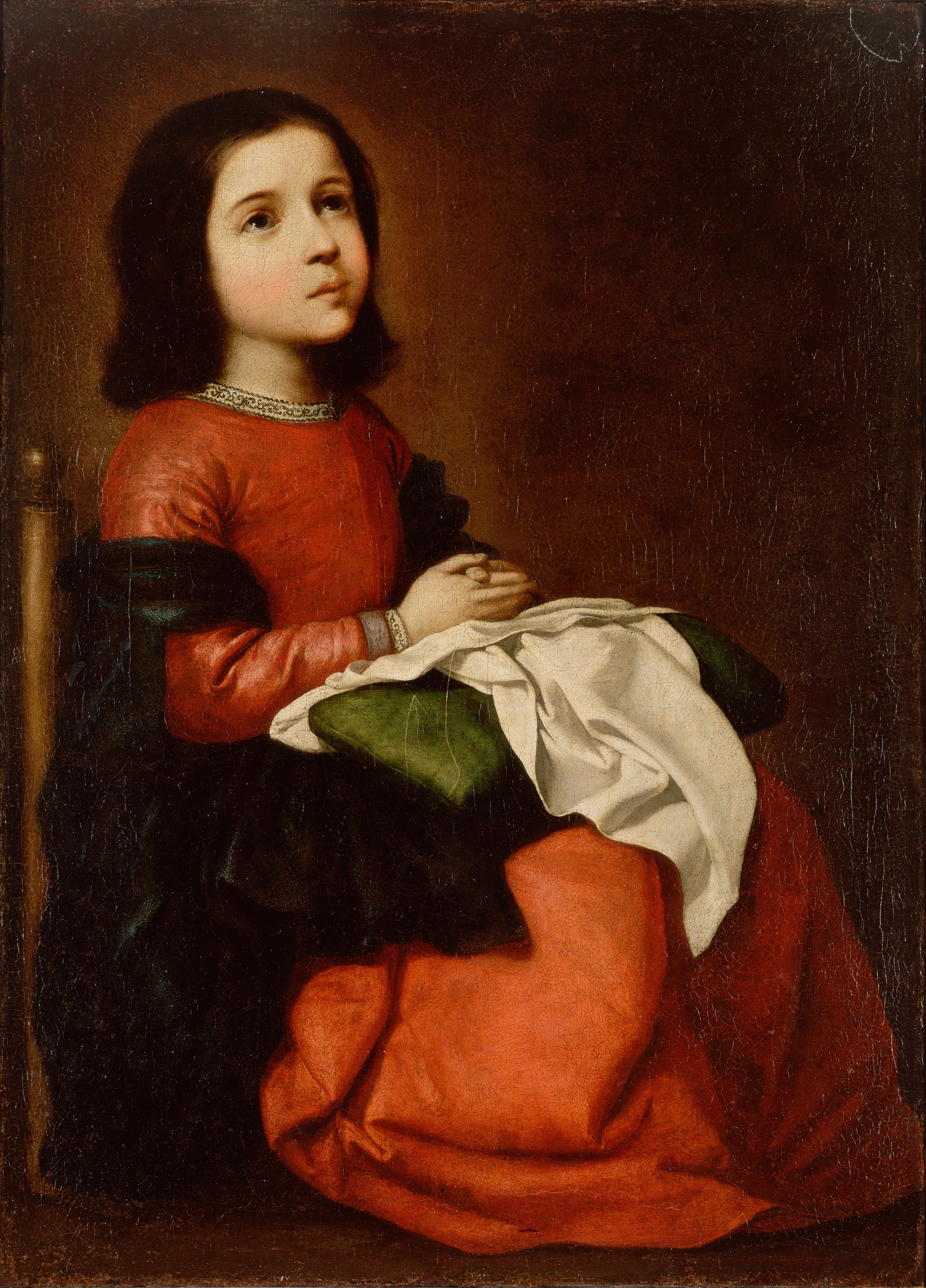
The Virgin Mary as a Child Praying, c. 1658–1664, Hermitage Museum, Saint Petersburg

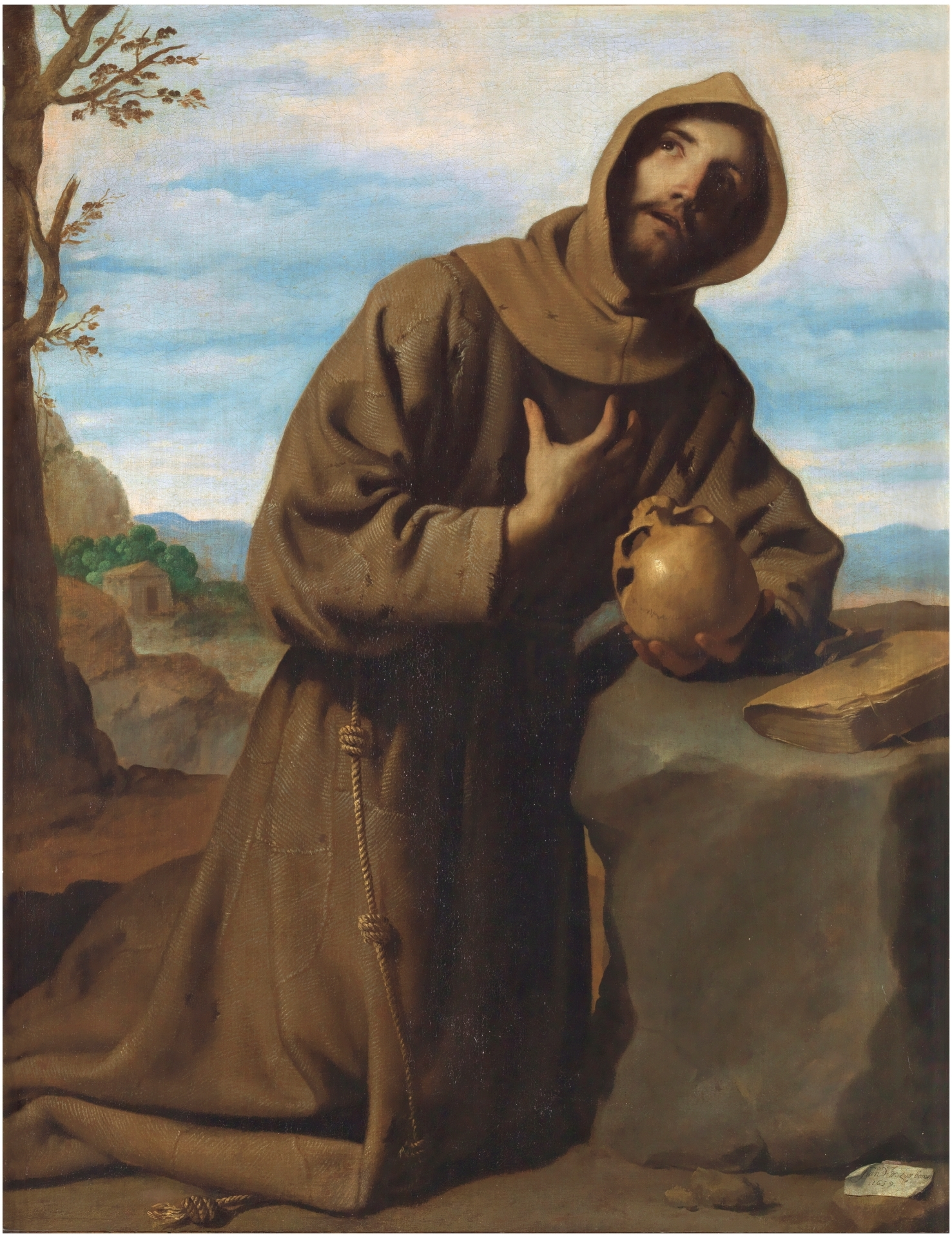
Saint Francis in Prayer, 1659, Museo del Prado, Madrid

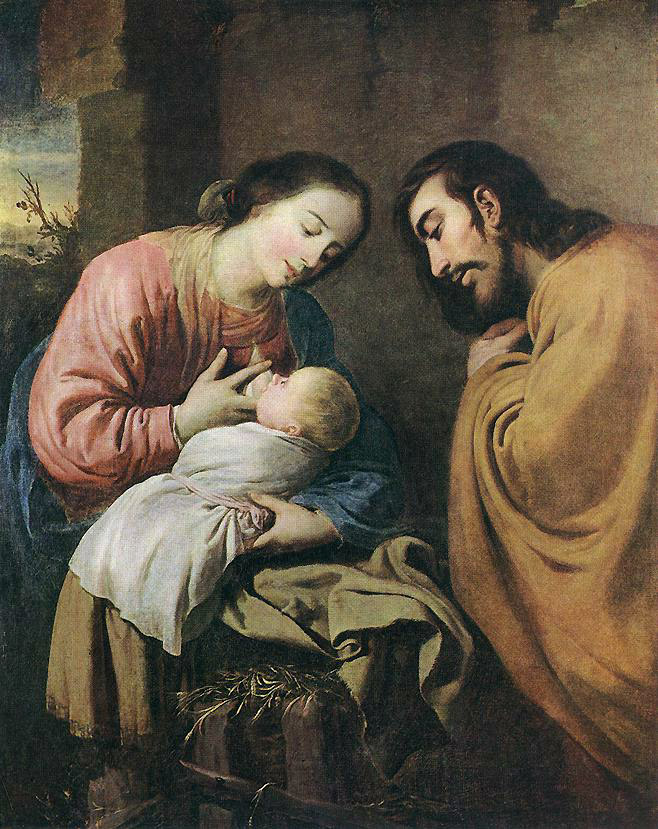
The Holy Family, 1659, Szépművészeti Múzeum, Budapest
