= The Young Virgin =

Painting by Francisco de Zurbarán

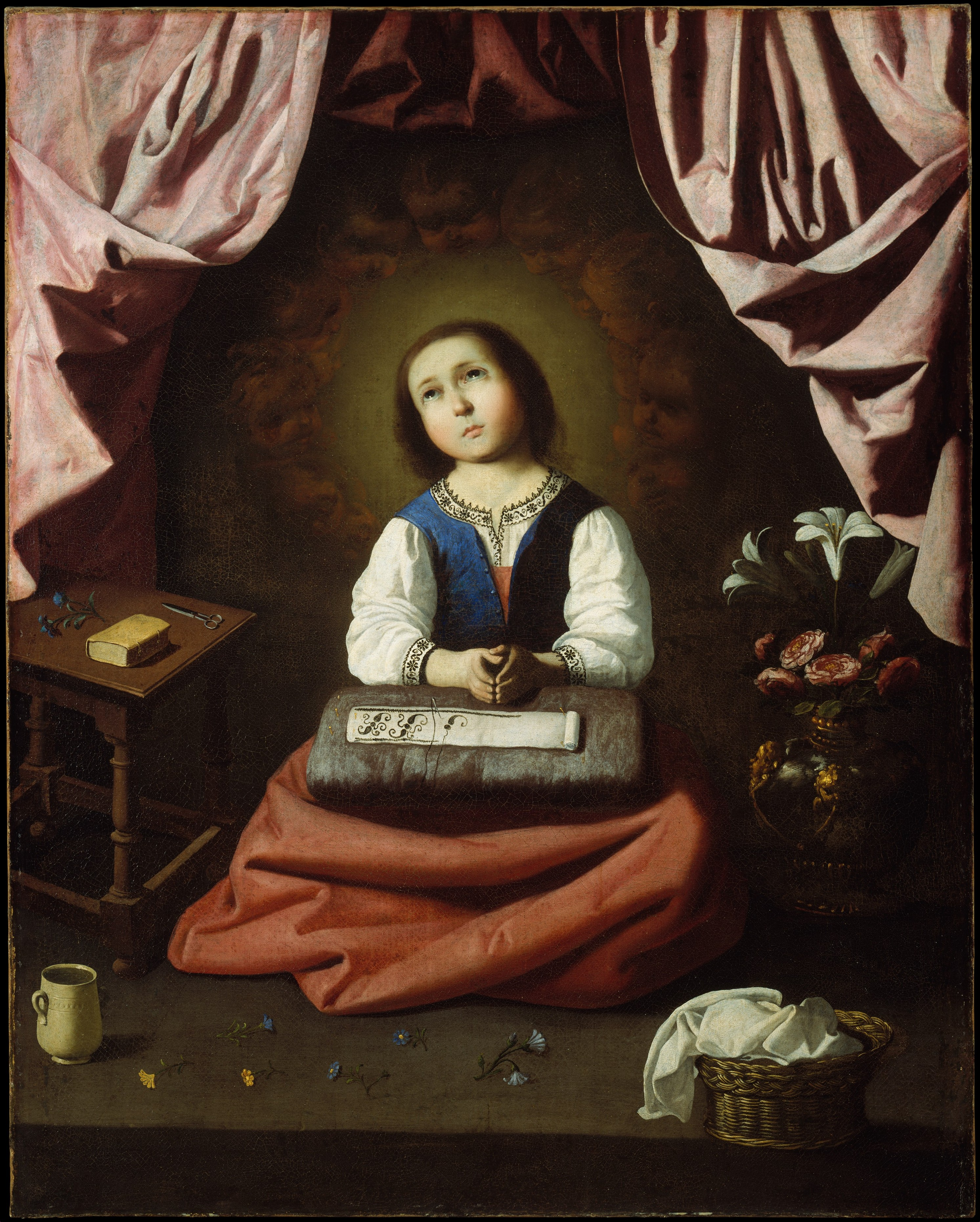
The Young Virgin (1632–1633) by Francisco de Zurbarán, Oil on canvas, 46 x 37 in. (116.8 x 94 cm)

The Young Virgin or The Virgin Mary as a Child in Ecstasy is a 1632-1633 painting by Francisco de Zurbarán. It is now in the collection of the Metropolitan Museum of Art in New York.
