= Still Life with Pots =

Two 1650 paintings by Francisco Zurbaran

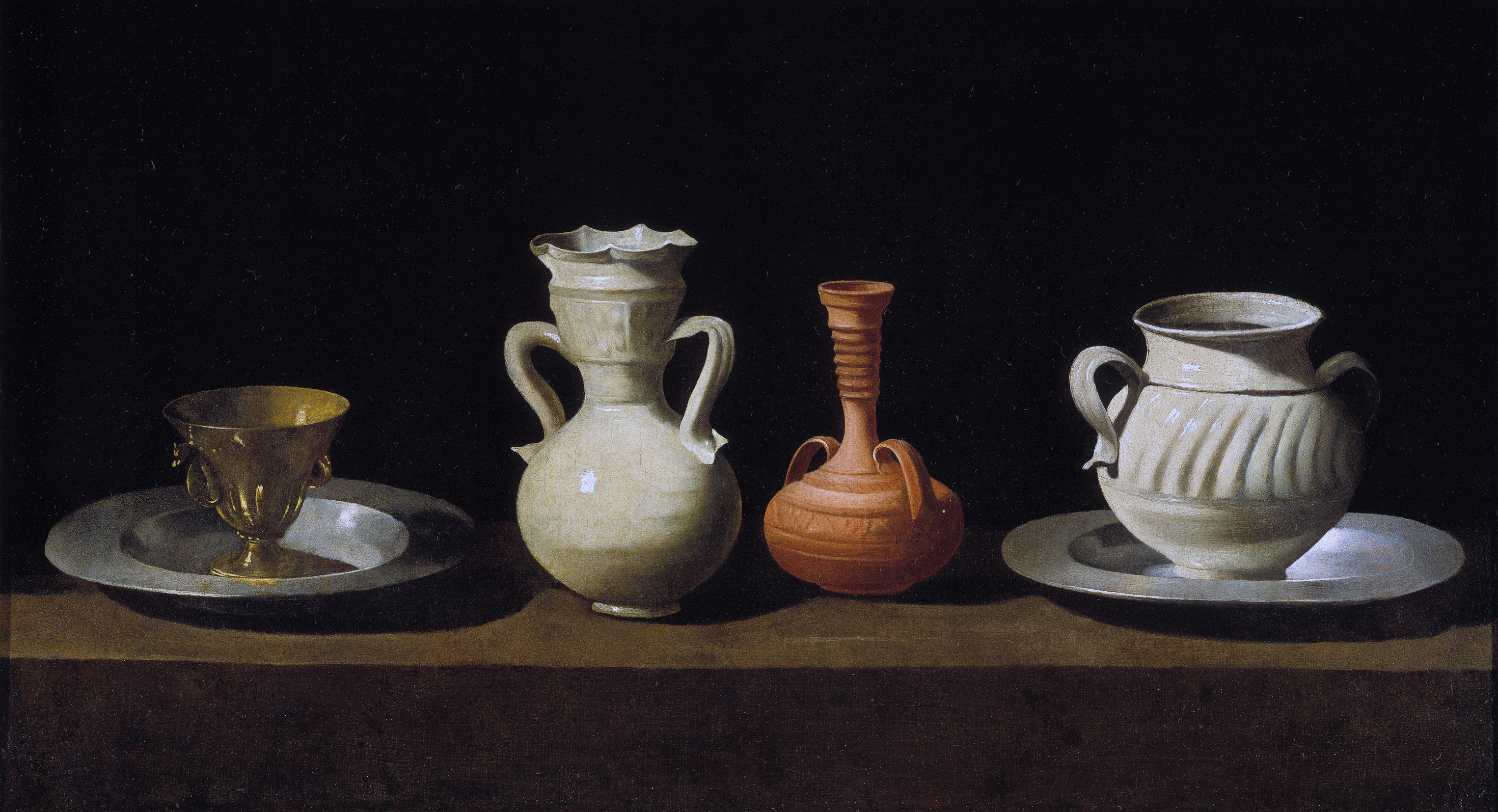
The Prado version

Still Life with Pots is the title of two 1650 paintings by Francisco de Zurbarán. The autograph version is now in the Museo del Prado, to which it was donated in 1940 by the collector Francesc Cambó. He also collected a second copy of the composition, which is now in the National Art Museum of Catalonia in Barcelona.
