= Enric Serra Auqué =

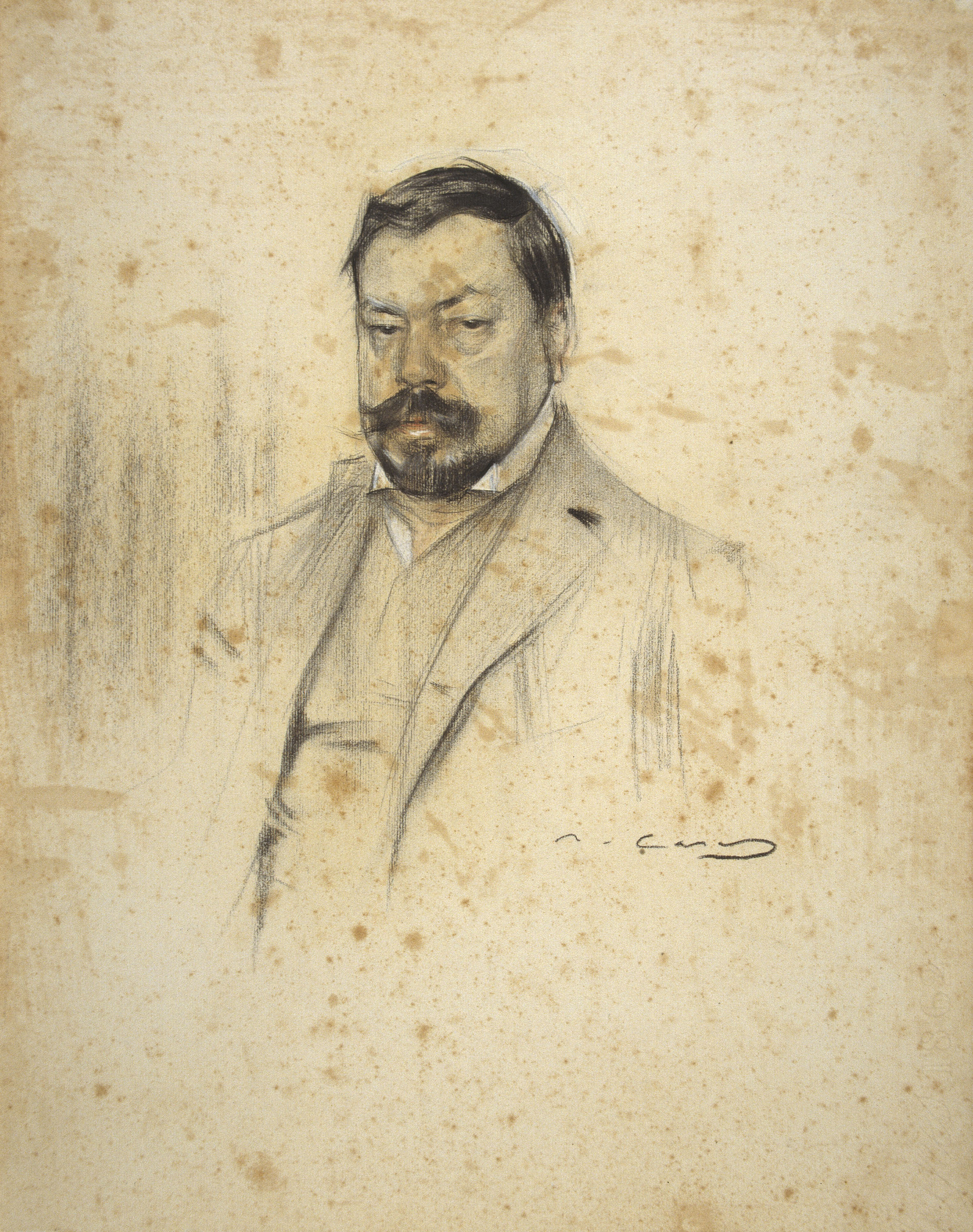
Enric Serra i Auque; portrait by Ramón Casas

Enric Serra i Auqué (7 January 1858, Barcelona – 16 February 1918, Rome) was a Catalan painter; best known for his landscapes in the Neoclassical style.

== Biography ==
His father, Pere Serra i Flaqué, a shoemaker, was a native of L'Escala. He studied at the Escola de la Llotja until 1874, under the direction of Domènec Talarn and Ramon Martí Alsina, among others.

As did most of his contemporaries, he chose to continue his studies in Rome; supported financially by the Masriera brothers, Josep and Francesc, and Joaquim de Càrcer i d'Amat, the Marquès of Castellbell. He arrived in time to become one of the last followers of Marià Fortuny, and was a member of the Accademia Chigi.

After completing his studies, in 1878, he remained in Rome. Many of the paintings he produced there featured lakes. He was also influenced by the works of Ramón Tusquets.

Later, when he had established himself, his workshop became a popular place for young painters to visit. As a hobby, he collected furniture and various antiques, many of which he used for backdrops in his paintings. He regularly sent his works back to Barcelona for exhibit at the Sala Parés. In 1895, he relocated to Paris. That same year, he was awarded a third-class medal at the National Exhibition of Fine Arts.

Later, he received a commission from Pope Leo XIII to design a mosaic of the Virgin and Child for installation at the monastery of Santa Maria de Ripoll.

His works may be seen at the Museu Nacional d'Art de Catalunya and at the Biblioteca Museu Víctor Balaguer in Vilanova i la Geltrú.

== Selected paintings ==
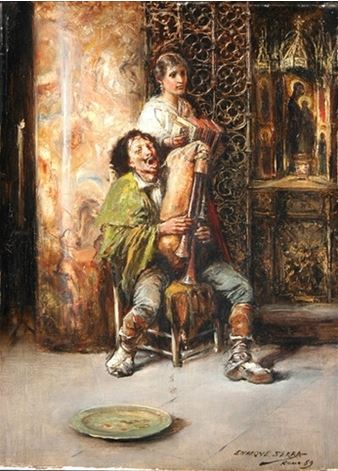
Musicians Playing for Alms

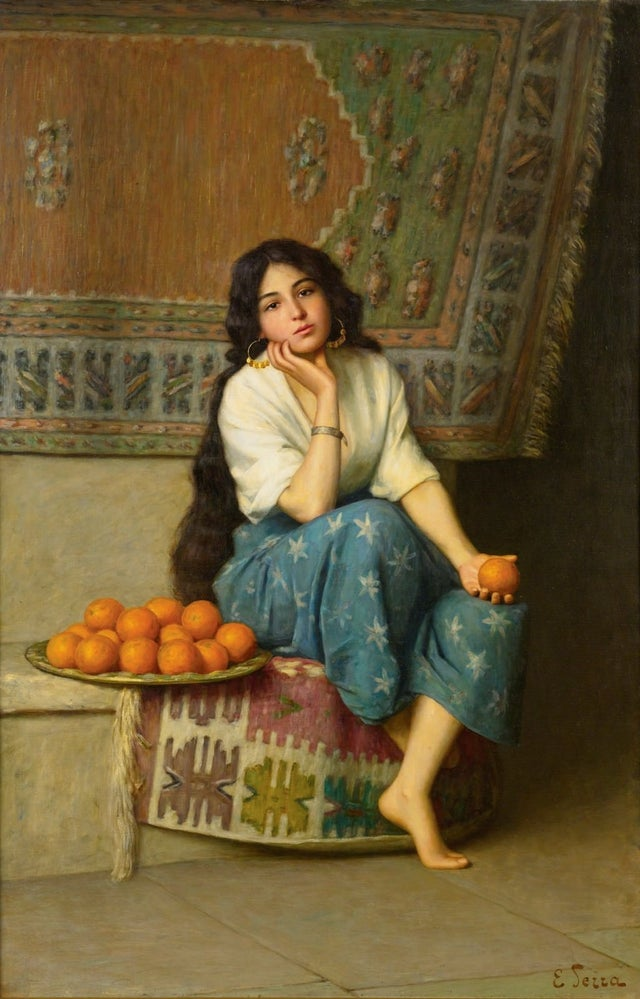
The Orange Seller

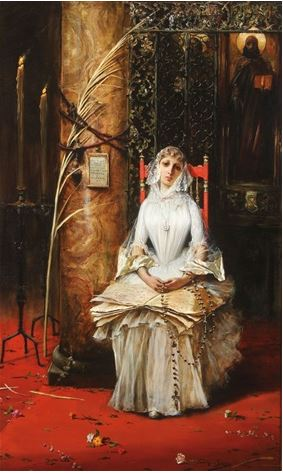
Lectio Divina

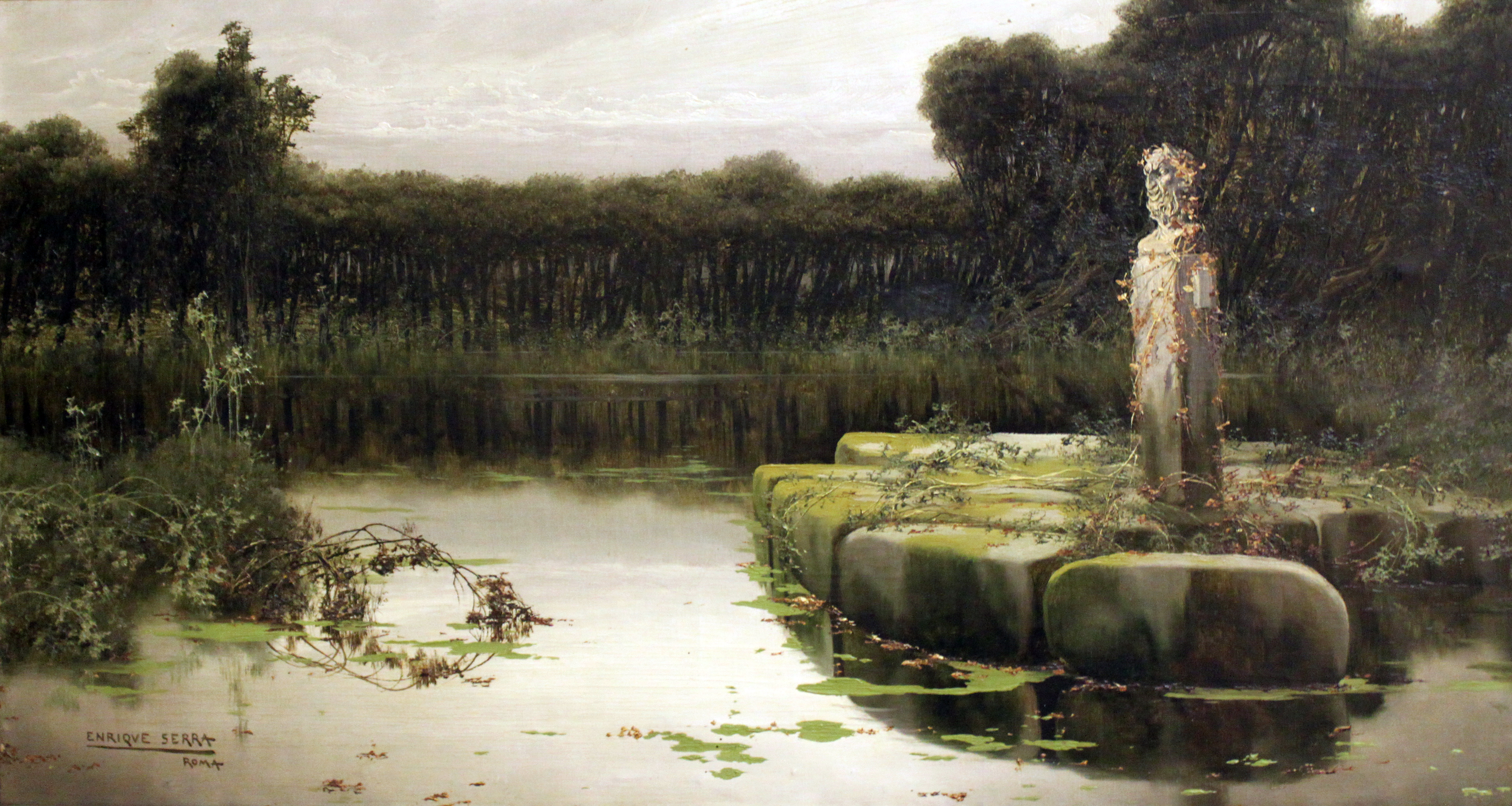
The Idol

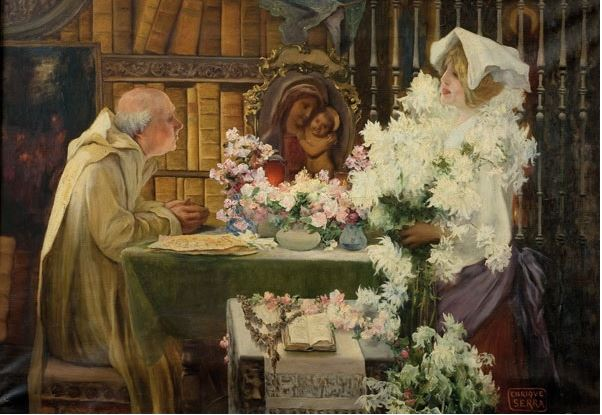
The Visit
