= Latium =

Historical region of Italy where Rome was founded

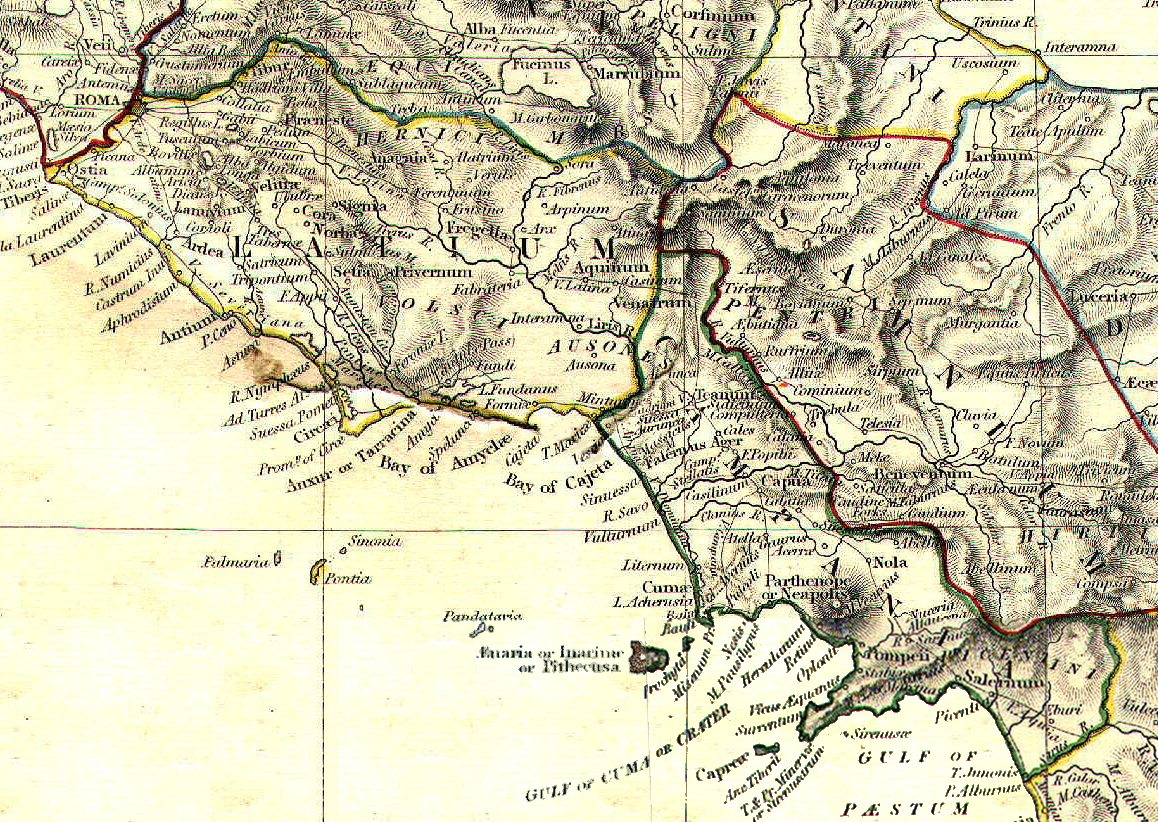
The Regioni of Latium and Campania

Latium (/ˈleɪʃiəm/ LAY-shee-əm, US also /-ʃəm/ -shəm; Latin: [ˈɫati.ũː]) is the region of central western Italy in which the city of Rome was founded, the capital city of the Roman Empire. The wide (Latin: latus), flat region lends its name to Latin.

== Definition ==
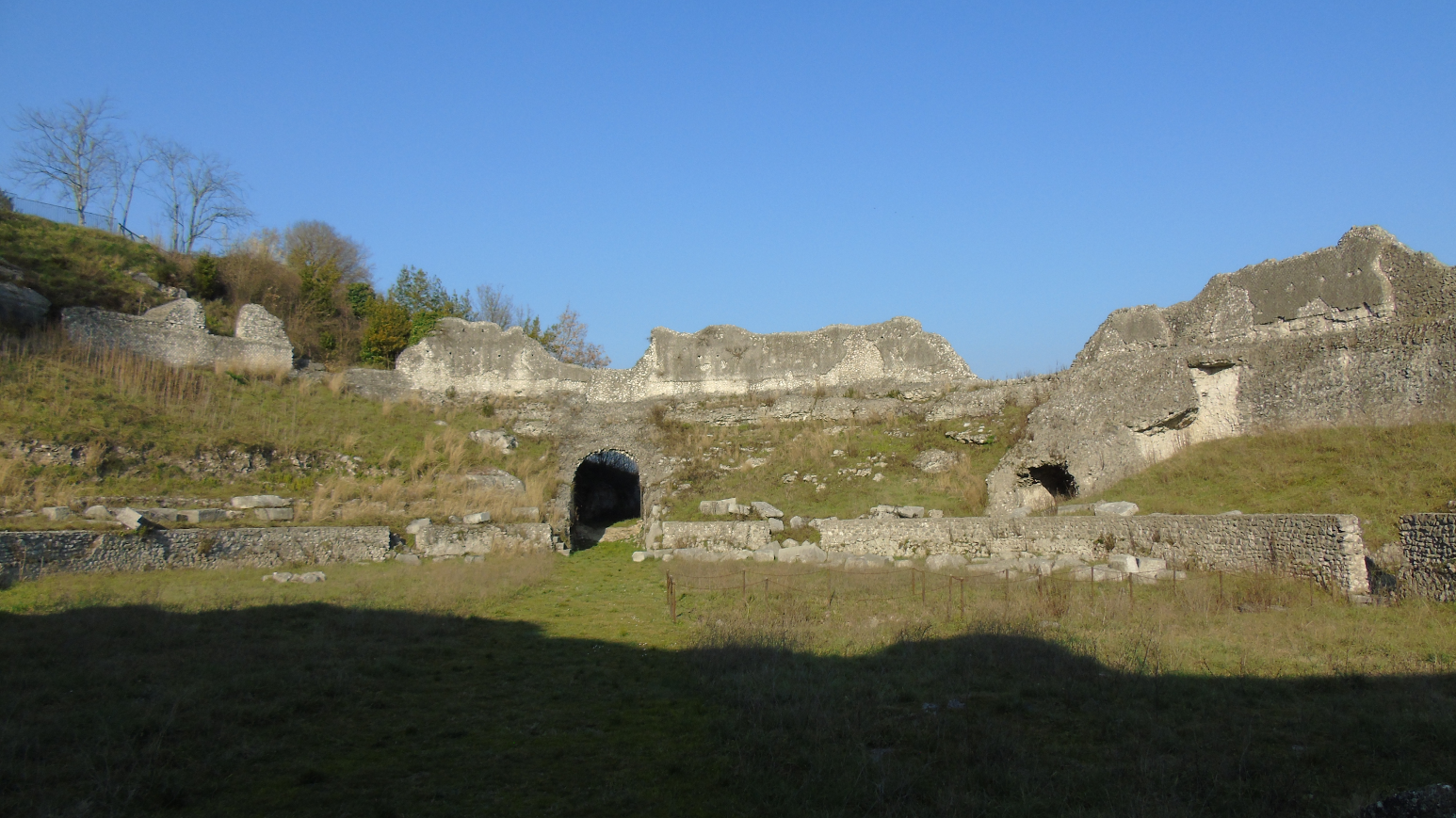
The town of Casinum

Latium was originally a small triangle of fertile, volcanic soil (Old Latium) on which resided the tribe of the Latins or Latians. It was located on the left bank (east and south) of the River Tiber, extending northward to the River Anio (a left-bank tributary of the Tiber) and southeastward to the Pomptina Palus (Pontine Marshes, now the Pontine Fields) as far south as the Circeian promontory. The right bank of the Tiber was occupied by the Etruscan city of Veii, and the other borders were occupied by Italic tribes. Subsequently, Rome defeated Veii and then its Italic neighbours, expanding its dominions over Southern Etruria and to the south, in a partly marshy and partly mountainous region. The latter saw the creation of numerous Roman and Latin colonies: small Roman colonies were created along the coast, while the inland areas were colonized by Latins and Romans without citizenship. The name Latium was thus also extended to this area south of Rome (Latium adiectum), up to the ancient Oscan city of Casinum, defined by Strabo as "the last city of the Latins".

The modern descendant, the Italian Regione of Lazio, also called Latium in Latin, and occasionally in modern English, is somewhat larger still, though less than twice the size of Latium vetus et adiectum, including a large area of ancient Southern Etruria and Sabina.

The ancient language of the Latins, the tribespeople who occupied Latium, was the immediate predecessor of the Old Latin language, ancestor of Latin and the Romance languages. Latium has played an important role in history owing to its status as the host of the capital city of Rome, at one time the cultural and political center of the Roman Empire. Consequently, Latium is home to celebrated works of art and architecture.

== Geography ==
The earliest known Latium was the country of the Latini, a tribe whose recognised center was a large, dormant volcano, Mons Albanus ("the Alban Mount", today's Colli Albani), 20 kilometres (12 mi) to the southeast of Rome, 64 kilometres (40 mi) in circumference. In its center is a crater lake, Lacus Albanus (Lago Albano), oval in shape, a few km long and wide. At the top of the second-highest peak (Monte Cavo) was a temple to Jupiter Latiaris, where the Latini held state functions before their subjection to Rome, and the Romans subsequently held religious and state ceremonies. The last pagan temple to be built stood until the Middle Ages when its stone and location were reused for various monasteries and finally a hotel. During World War II, the Wehrmacht turned it into a radio station, which was captured after an infantry battle by American troops in 1944, and it currently is a controversial telecommunications station surrounded by antennas considered unsightly by the population within view.

The selection of Jupiter as a state god and the descent of the name Latini to the name of the Latin language are sufficient to identify the Latins as a tribe of Indo-European descent. Virgil, a major poet of the early Roman Empire, under Augustus, derived Latium from the word for "hidden" (English latent) because in a myth Saturn, ruler of the golden age in Latium, hid (latuisset) from Jupiter there. A major modern etymology is that Lazio comes from the Latin word "latus", meaning "wide", expressing the idea of "flat land" meaning the Roman Campagna.

== History ==
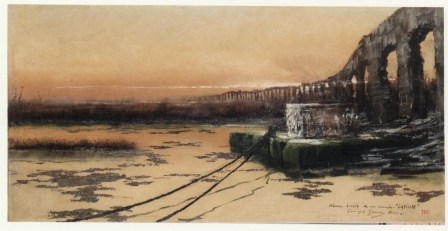
Latium, Enric Serra Auqué, 1888. Biblioteca Museu Víctor Balaguer

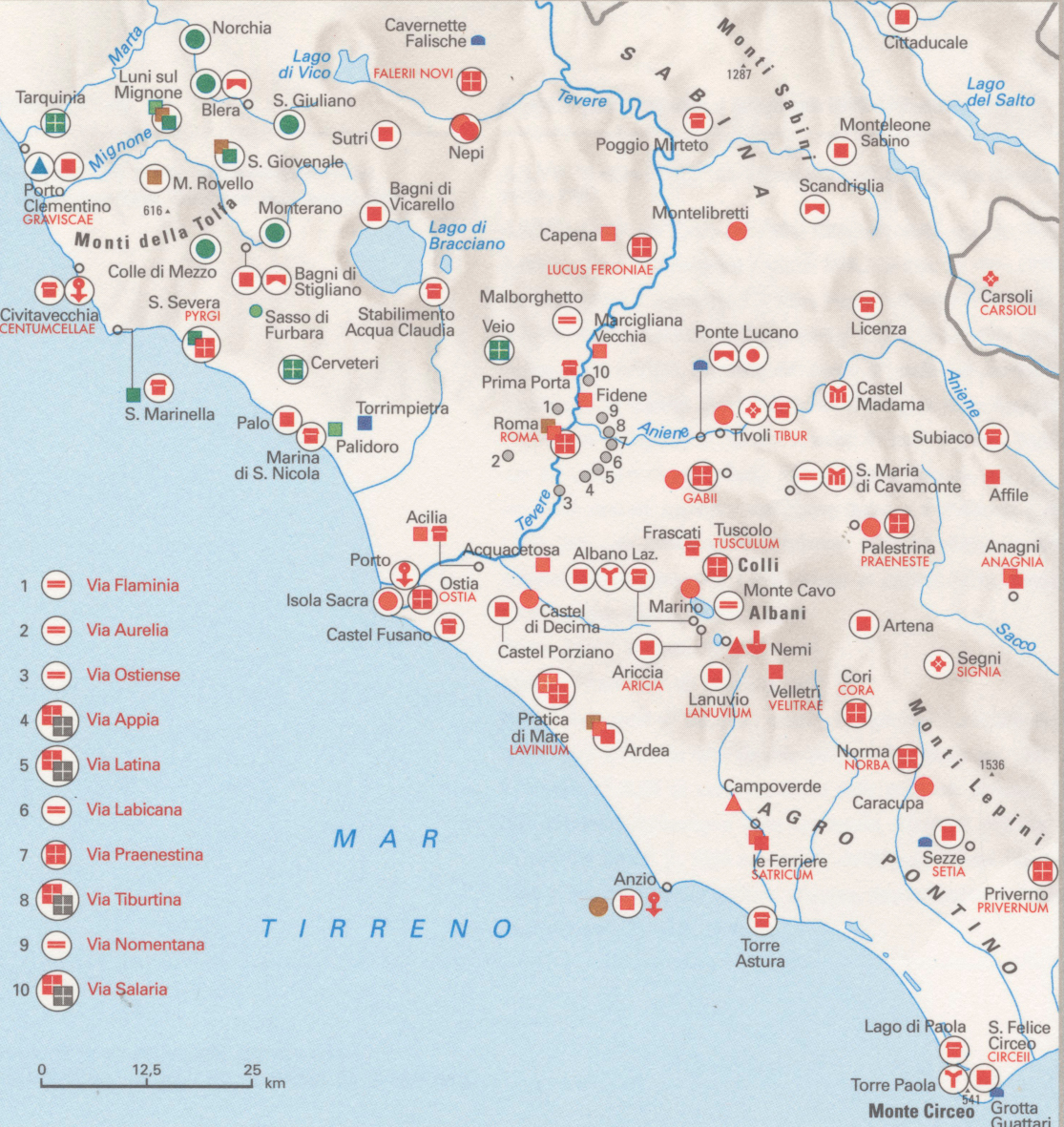
Archeological sites of Latium

The region that would become Latium had been home to settled agricultural populations since the early Bronze Age and was known to the Ancient Greeks and even earlier to the Mycenaean Greeks. The name is most likely derived from the Latin word "latus", meaning "wide", expressing the idea of "flat land" (in contrast to the local Sabine high country). The Etruscans, from their home region of Etruria, exerted a strong cultural and political influence on Latium from about the 8th century BC onward. However, they were unable to assert political hegemony over the region, which was controlled by small, autonomous city-states in a manner roughly analogous to the state of affairs that prevailed in Ancient Greece. Indeed, the region's cultural and geographic proximity to the cities of Magna Graecia had a strong impact upon its early history.

By the 10th century BC, archaeology records a slow development in agriculture from the entire area of Latium with the establishment of numerous villages. The Latins cultivated grains (spelt and barley), grapes (Vitis vinifera), olives, apples, and fig trees. The various Latini populi (lit. "Latin peoples") lived in a society led by influential clans (gentes). These clans were a sign of their tribal origin, which continued in Rome as the thirty curiae which organized Roman society. However, as a social unit the gens was replaced by the family which was headed by the paterfamilias - the oldest male who held supreme authority over the family.

A fixed local center seemed necessary as the center of the region cannot have been one of the villages, but must have been a place of common assembly, containing the seat of justice and the common sanctuary of the district, where members of the clans met for purposes of administration and amusement, and where they obtained a safer shelter for themselves in case of war: in ordinary circumstances such a place was not at all or but scantily inhabited. Such a place was called in Italy "height" (capitolium, the mountain-top), or "stronghold" (arx, from arcere); it was not a town at first, but it became the nucleus of one, as houses naturally gathered around the stronghold and were afterwards surrounded with the "ring" (urbs, connected with urvus and curvus).

The isolated Alban range, that natural stronghold of Latium, which offered to settlers a secure position, would doubtless be first occupied by the newcomers. Here, along the narrow plateau above Palazzuola between the Alban lake (Lagiod di Castello) and the Alban mount (Monte Cavo), extended the town of Alba Longa, which was regarded as the primitive seat of the Latin stock, and the mother city of Rome as well as of all the other Old Latin communities; here on the slopes lay the very ancient Latin districts of Lanuvium, Aricia, and Tusculum. Here too are found some primitive works of masonry, which usually mark the beginnings of civilization.

The district-strongholds there later gave rise to the considerable towns of Tibur and Praeneste. Labici too, Gabii, Nomentum in the plain between the Alban and Sabine hills and the Tiber, Rome on the Tiber, Laurentum and Lavinium on the coast, were all more or less ancient centers of Latin colonization, not to speak of many other less famous and in some cases almost forgotten.

=== Latin League ===
All these villages were politically sovereign, and each of them was self-governing. The closeness of descent and their common language not only pervaded all of them, but manifested itself in an important religious and political institution—the Latin League. The Latins were tied together by religious associations, including worship of Venus, Jupiter Latiaris, and of Diana at the Lake of Ariccia. So, by virtue of her proximity to the sanctuary of Jupiter, the village of Alba Longa held a position of religious primacy among the Latin villages. Originally, thirty villages were entitled to participate in the league, known as the Alban colonies. Only a few of the individual names of these villages are recorded.

The ritual of this league was the "Latin festival" (feriae Latinae), at which, on the Mount of Alba, upon a day annually appointed by the chief magistrate for the purpose, an ox was sacrificed by the assembled Latin stock to the "Latin god" (Jupiter Latiaris). Each community taking part in the ceremony had to contribute to the sacrificial feast. However; the sacred grove of Aricia, the Nemus Dianae, on the Lake of Aricia, was always among the most popular place of pilgrimage for the Latins.

Although Alba Longa enjoyed a position of religious primacy, the Alban presidency never held any significant political power over Latium, e.g. it was never the capital of a Latin state. It is probable that the extent of the Latin League's jurisdiction was somewhat unsettled and thus fluctuated; yet it remained for its existence not an accidental aggregate of various communities, but the positive expression of the relationship of the Latin stock. The Latin League may not have at all times included all Latin communities, but it never granted the privilege of membership to any that were not Latin.

Very early in its existence, Rome acquired the presidency of the league, and Alba Longa appeared as a rival for which it was destroyed in the mid-7th century BC; the league, as it was, had been dissolved and the foremost families were compelled to move to Rome: Alba Longa, the mother city, was dissolved into Rome, the daughter.

According to Livy, Alba Longa was razed to the ground - spare the temples - by King Tullus of Rome. The Latin festival would still be held on the Alban mount, but by Roman magistrates.

=== Roman hegemony ===
Having destroyed Alba Longa, Rome was in command of the Latin festival and thus held presidency over the Latin peoples. By the mid-7th century BC, Rome had secured itself as a maritime power and secured its salt supply; the Via Salaria (lit. "salt road") was paved from Rome down to Ostia on the northern bank of the river Tiber - the closest salt-field in Western Italy.

At the same time, archaeologists detect, there was an urban transformation of the area. Roman huts were being replaced by houses, and a social space, or forum, was built by c. 620 BC. The influence of the Etruscans played an important role, and migrants came from Etruscan towns. Soon (according to tradition) it was followed by the rule of Etruscan kings, the Tarquins (traditionally, 616-509 BC).

While Rome may have acquired considerable territory (some 350 sq. miles) in Latium, Roman kings never exercised absolute power over Latium. The Latin cities did, however, look to Rome for protection, for Rome had more manpower than any other city in Latium. This was due, in part, to Rome's generous policy of asylum: Roman kindness was unique in its readiness to grant citizenship to outsiders, citizenship was even granted to former slaves. The children of freedmen provided an important source for Roman armies and gave Rome a definite edge in manpower over other cities of the time.

=== Roman Republic and after ===
The emperor Augustus officially united all of present-day Italy into a single geo-political entity, Italia, dividing it into eleven regions. Latium – together with the present region of Campagna immediately to the southeast of Latium and the seat of Naples – became Region I.

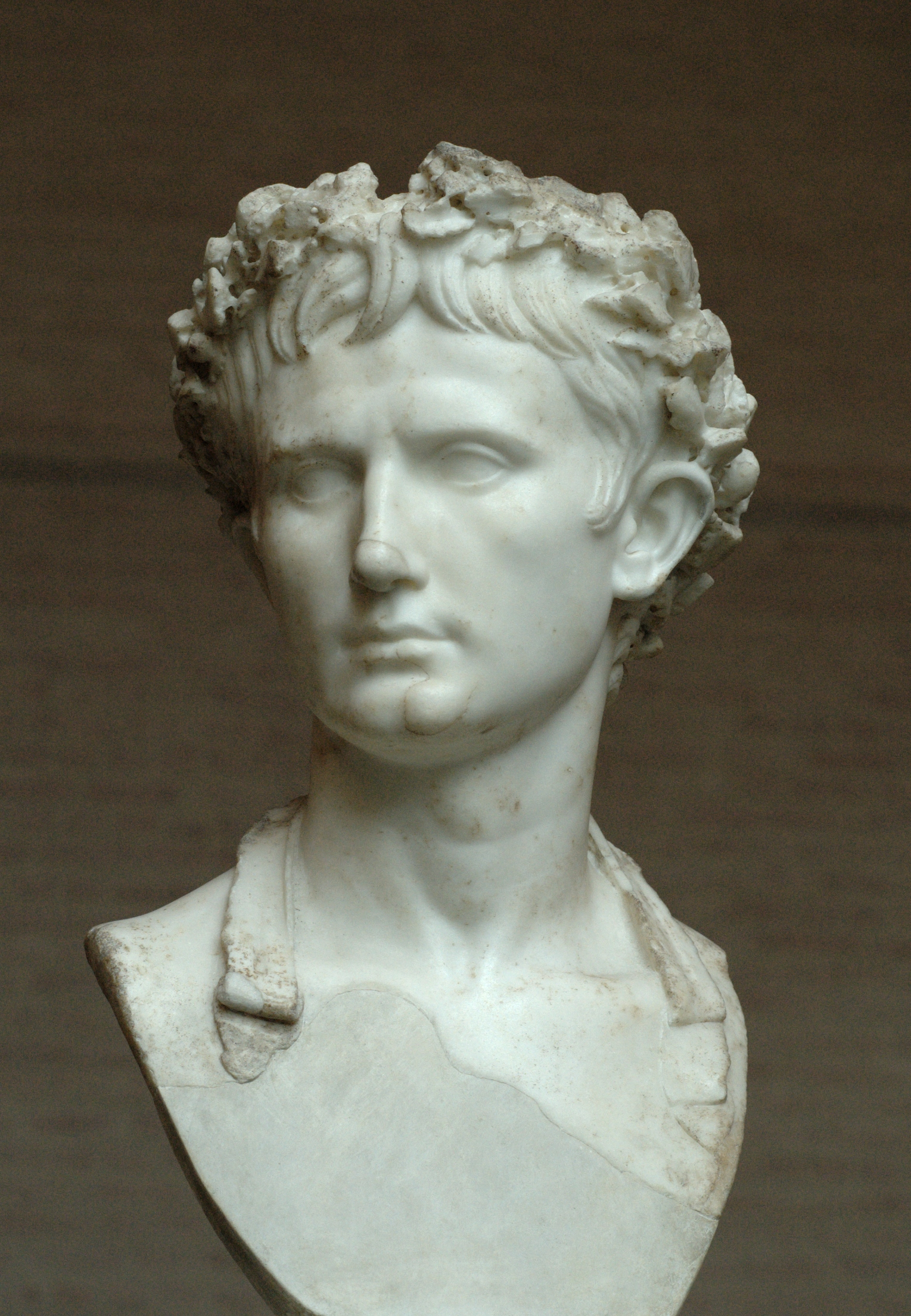
Bust of Augustus wearing the Civic Crown. Glyptothek, Munich

After the Gothic War (535–554) A.D. and the Eastern Roman (Byzantine) conquest, this region regained its freedom, because the "Roman Duchy" became the property of the Eastern Emperor. However the long wars against the barbarian Longobards weakened the region, which was seized by the Roman Bishop who already had several properties in those territories.

The strengthening of the religious and ecclesiastical aristocracy led to continuous power struggles between lords and the Roman bishop until the middle of the 16th century. Innocent III tried to strengthen his own territorial power, wishing to assert his authority in the provincial administrations of Tuscia, Campagna and Marittima through the Church's representatives, in order to reduce the power of the Colonna family. Other popes tried to do the same.

During the period when the papacy resided in Avignon, France (1309–1377), the feudal lords' power increased due to the absence of the Pope from Rome. Small communes, and Rome above all, opposed the lords' increasing power, and with Cola di Rienzo, they tried to present themselves as antagonists of the ecclesiastical power. However, between 1353 and 1367, the papacy regained control of Latium and the rest of the Papal States.

From the middle of the 16th century, the papacy politically unified Latium with the Papal States, so that these territories became provincial administrations of St. Peter's estate; governors in Viterbo, in Marittima and Campagna, and in Frosinone administered them for the papacy.

After the short-lived Roman Republic (18th century), the region's annexation to France by Napoleon Bonaparte in February 1798, Latium became again part of the Papal States in October, 1799.

On 20 September 1870, the capture of Rome, during the reign of Pope Pius IX, and France's defeat at Sedan, completed Italian unification, and Latium was incorporated into the Kingdom of Italy.

== Modern region of Latium ==
Latium, often referred to by the Italian name Lazio, is a government region, one of the first-level administrative divisions of the state, and one of twenty regions in Italy. Originally meant as administrative districts of the central state, the regions acquired a significant level of autonomy following a constitutional reform in 2001. The modern region of Latium contains the national capital Rome.

== See also ==
- Latin League
- Latium adiectum
- Latin Valley
- Fidenae
- Etruria
- Ladina
