= Pablo Rey =

Spanish painter (born 1968)

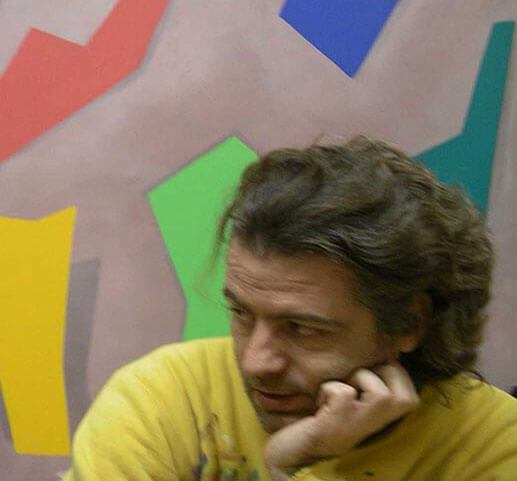
- Born: Pablo Gabino Rey Sendón; 1968; Barcelona, Spain
- Education: University of Barcelona, Baruch College
- Known for: Painting
- Movement: Contemporary

Pablo Gabino Rey Sendón ([ˈpaβlo ɣaˈβino ˈrej senˈdon], known artistically as Pablo Rey) is a Spanish painter artist born in Barcelona in 1968.

== Early life ==
His father was the Spanish realist painter Gabino Rey. In 1989 he received the Talens prize in the contest of young painters at the Sala Parés Gallery (Barcelona), and in 1992 he won the Raimon Maragall i Noble prize in the same contest. In 1994 the University of Barcelona acquired one of his works. In 1994 he graduated in Fine Arts from Barcelona University.

== Career ==
In 1996, Rey moved to New York City. In 1997 he participated in The Gramercy International Art Fair in New York, with the gallery Pierogi 2000 and was one of the artists from New York in the exhibition "New Tide" at the Williamsburg Art & Historical Center in Brooklyn, New York. In 1998 he was one of the artists in the documentary film 98 IN NY produced by Canal +, about Spanish artists in New York.

In 1999 he made a car trip from New York to Texas, from which he made a series of works entitled NY-TX, exhibited in the Holland Tunnel Art Projects gallery in New York City in June 2000. In 2004 he and Luis Trullenque had an exhibition "Two painters on the same canvas," in Benedormiens castle in Santa Cristina d’ Aro in Girona.

In 2009 in Sant Feliu de Guíxols Rey presented the exhibition "Conjunctions three painters on the same canvas", with painters Alex Pallí and Luis Trullenque. It opened that summer in the monastery of Sant Feliu de Guíxols and in 2011 it traveled to the House of Culture of Gerona.

In 2013 he held an individual exhibition entitled 'Recent Work' at the Fundació Casa Josep Irla, in Sant Feliu de Guíxols, Costa Brava, Gerona and in 2014 he was in the exhibition ' Framed ', in the Holland Tunnel gallery from New York.

== Featured exhibitions ==
He has exhibited at the Williamsburg Art & Historical Center in Brooklyn, New York.

== Gallery ==
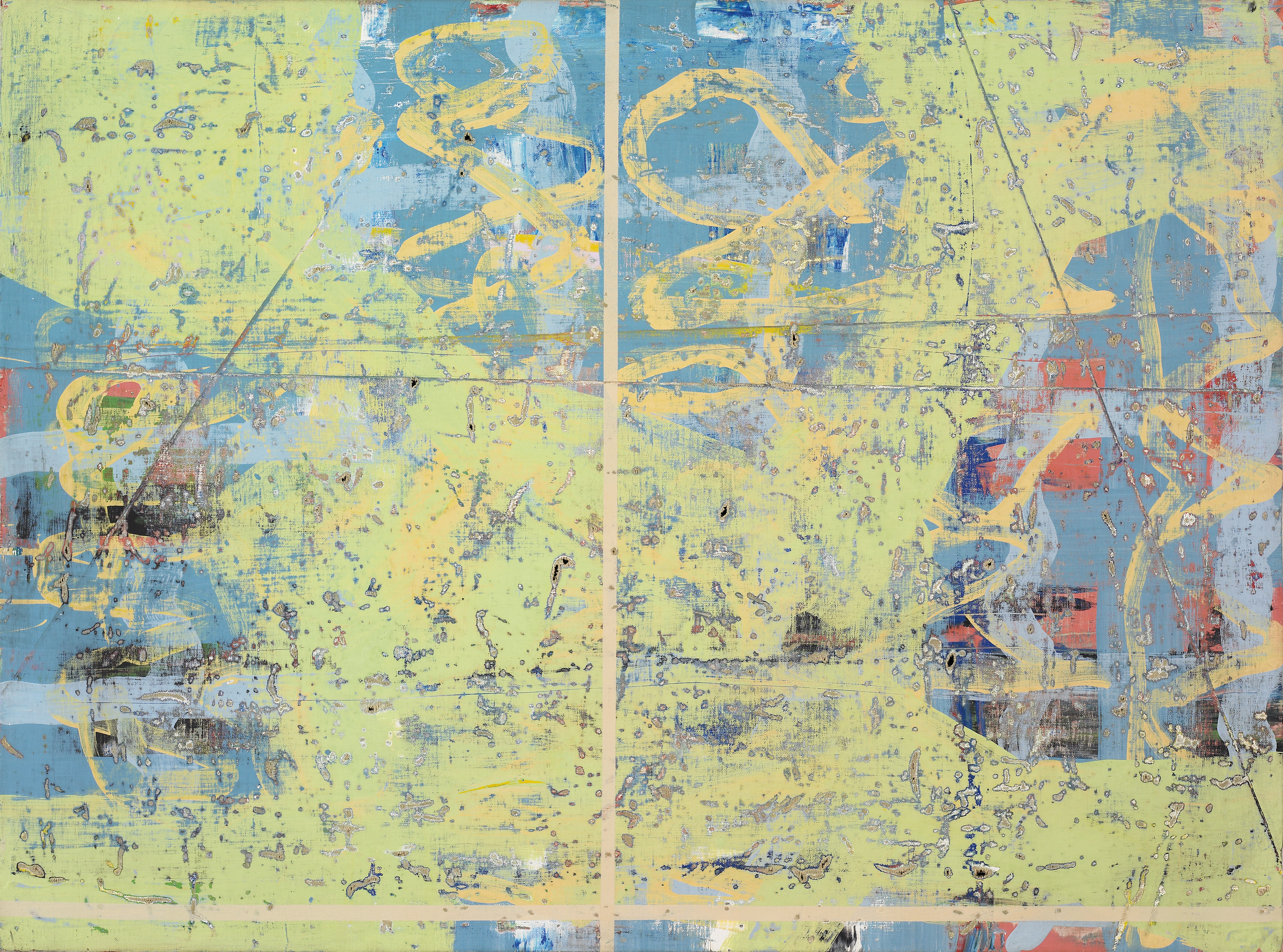
Pablo Rey, Green Stain, Brooklyn, NY 1996

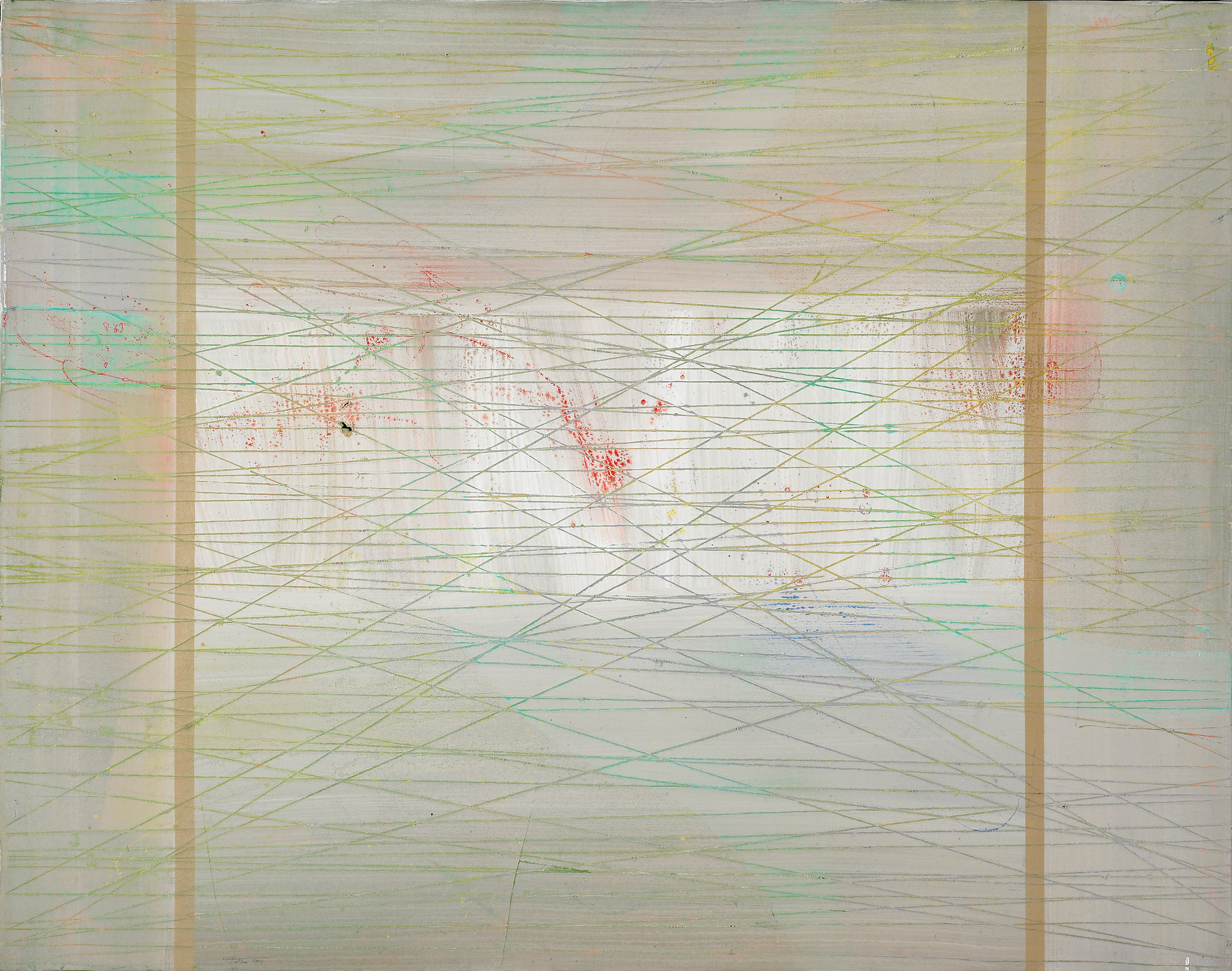
Pablo Rey, Sueño en el puente de Brooklyn, Williamsburg, bklyn, NY 1997

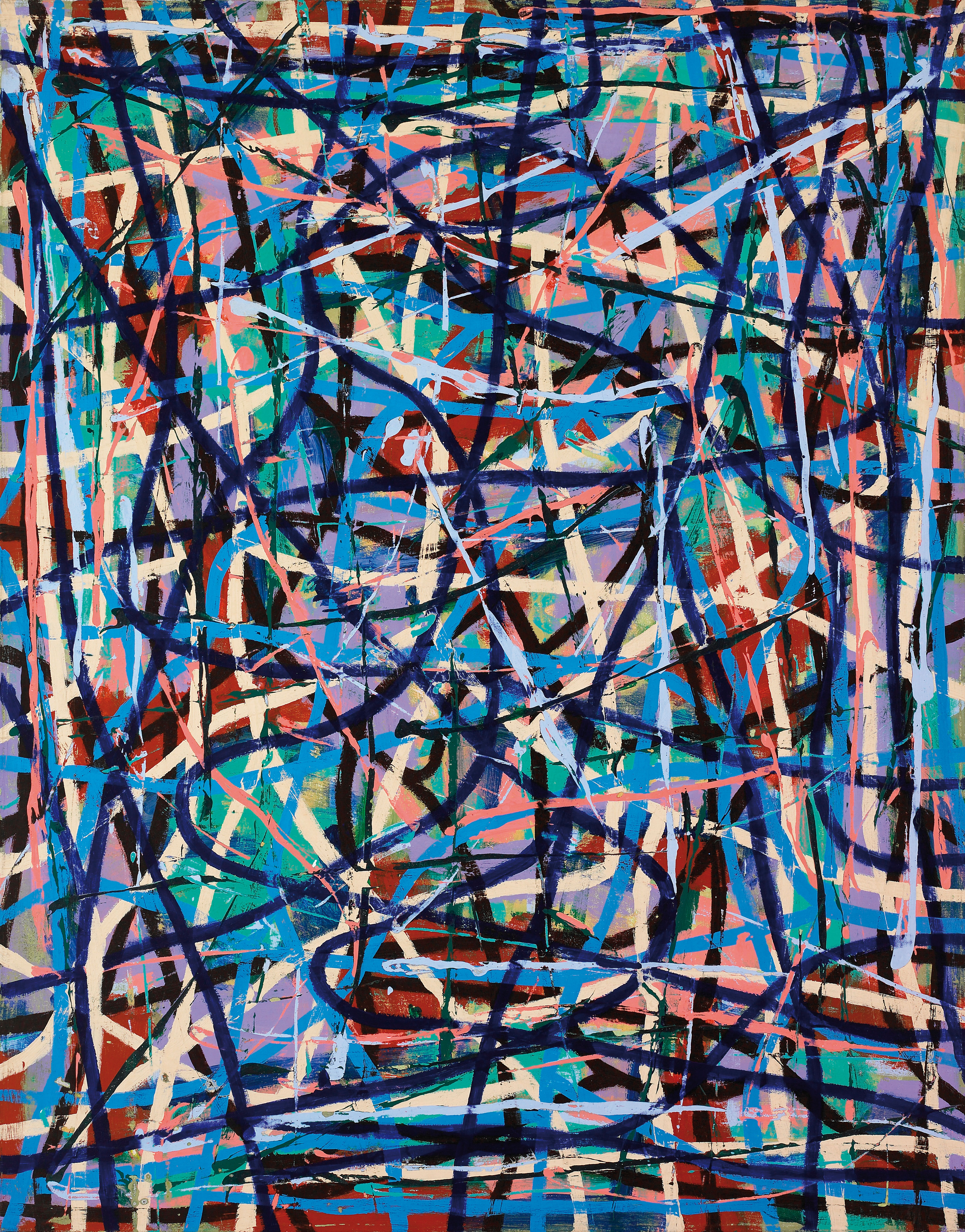
Pablo Rey, Correction 40, NY, 1998

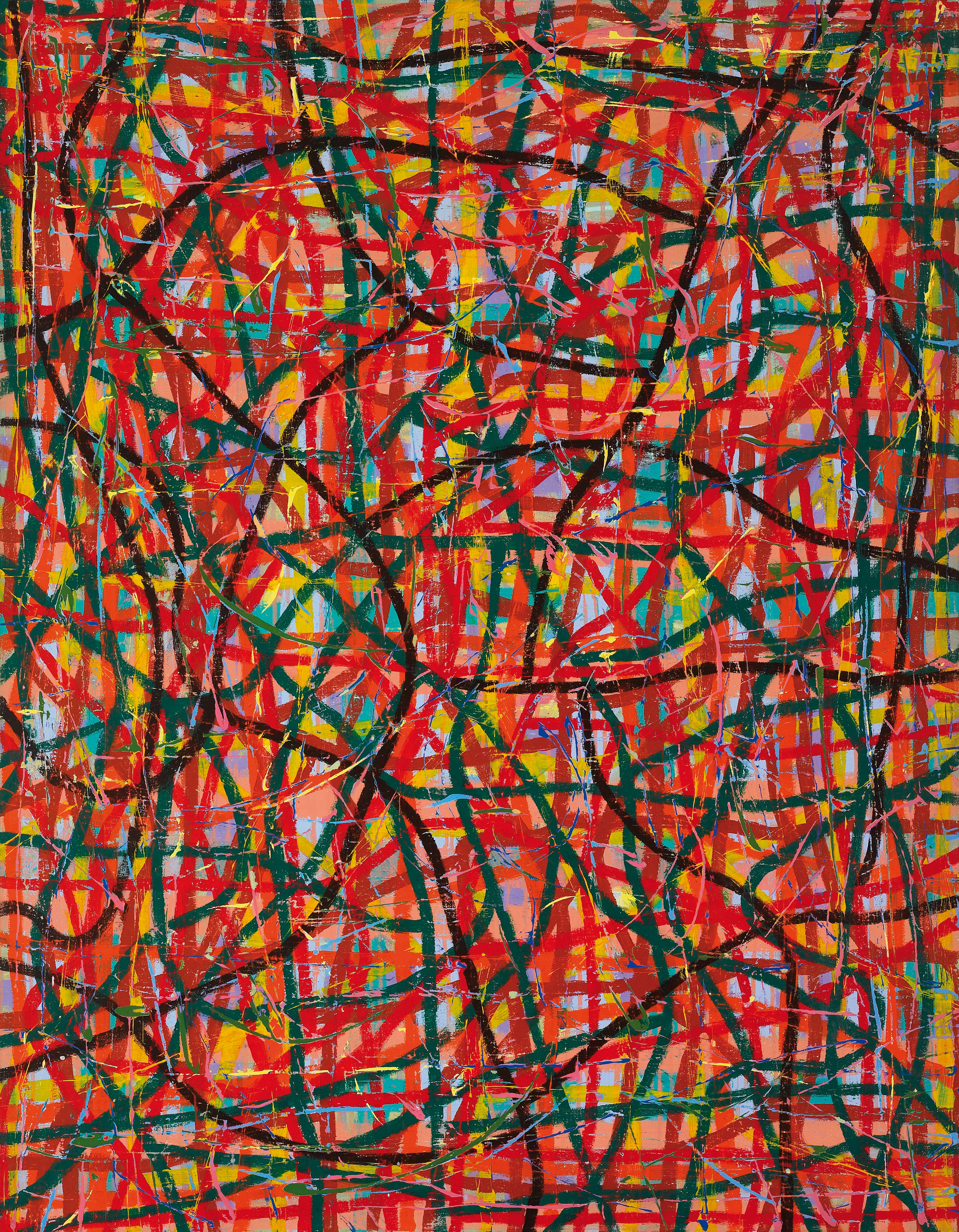
Pablo Rey, Correction 32, NY, 1999

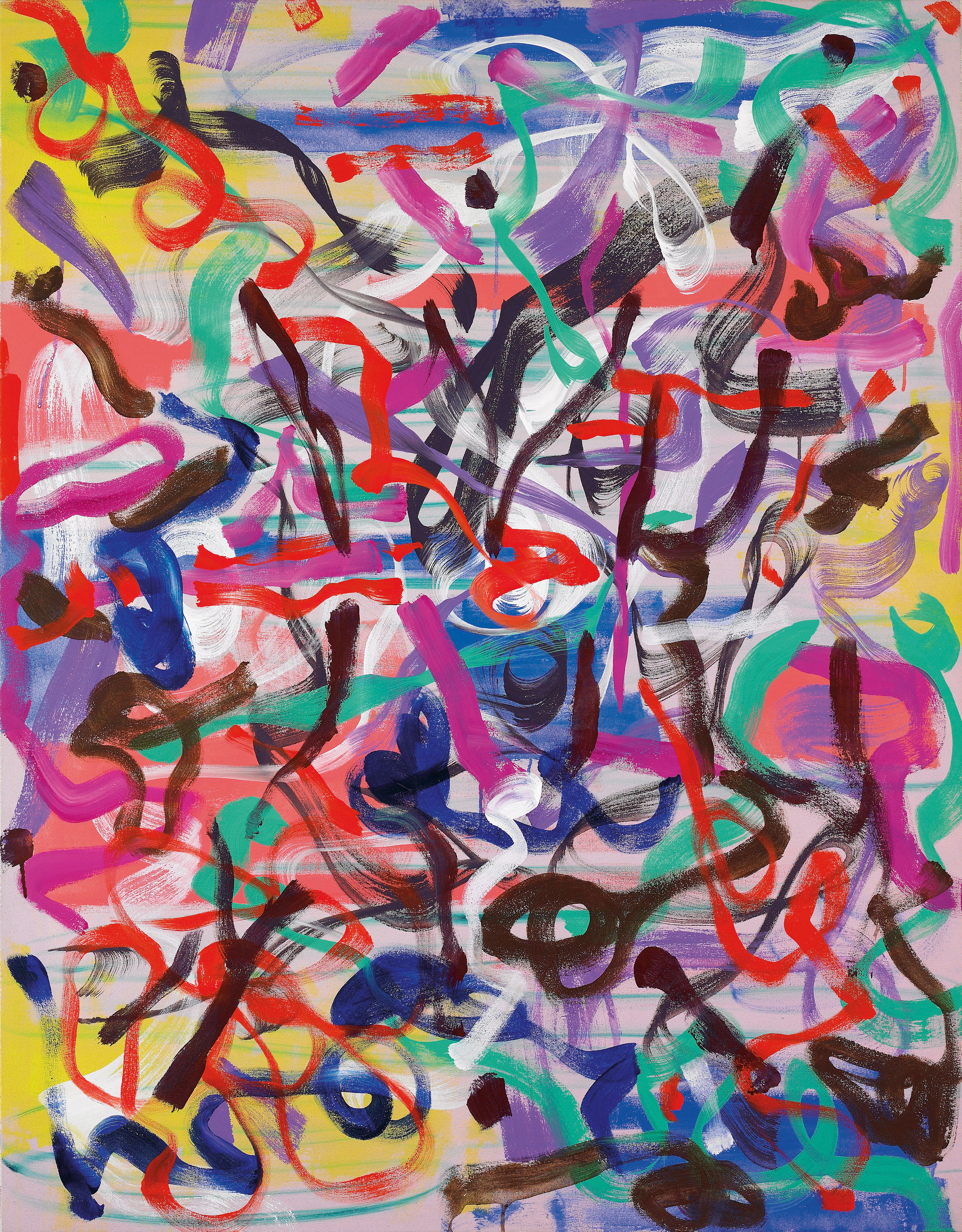
PabloRey, Campo policrónico 56, Bcn 2000

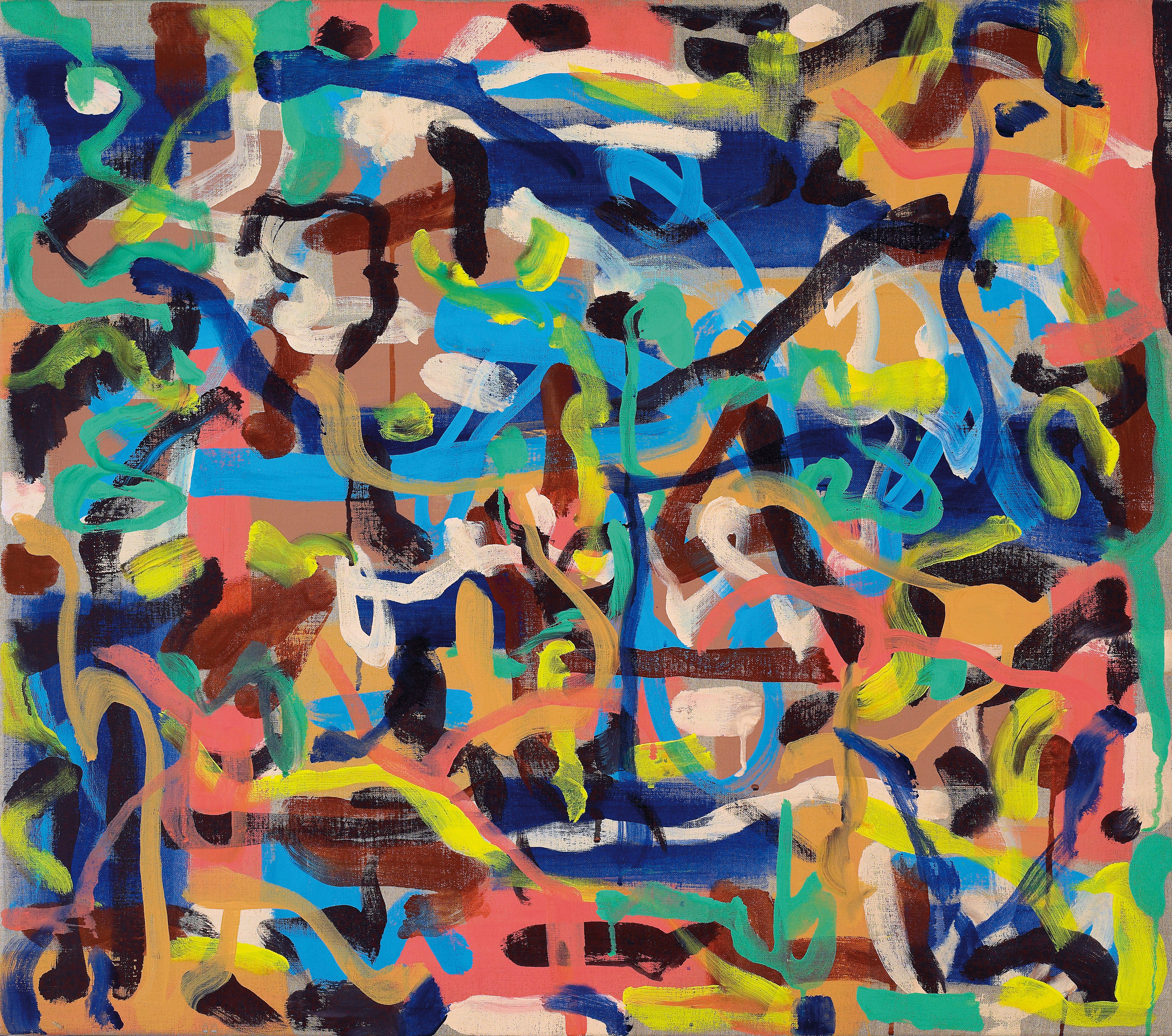
Pablo Rey, Campo policrónico 40, Bcn 2000

== Bibliography ==
- Pilar Giró; Arnau Puig; Carles Lapuente (2008). Pablo Rey, Pinturas / Paintings 1996-2008. Madrid: SAP Editor. ISBN 978-8-469-16889-9. Wikidata Q64438100
  - Library of the Museo Nacional Centro de Arte Reina Sofía
  - Library of the Museo d'Art Contemporani de Barcelona
  - Library of the Centro Galego de Arte Contemporánea
  - Library of the Euskal Herriko unibertsitateko liburutegia
  - Library of the Universidad de BBAA de Sevilla
  - Jacques Dupin Library, of the Fundació Joan Miró
  - Library of the CRAI Belles Arts, Universitat de Barcelona
  - Library of Fine Arts, Universidad Complutense, Madrid
  - Library of the Universidad Alfonso X El Sabio
