= Lluís Masriera i Rosés =

Spanish jewellery designer (1872–1958)

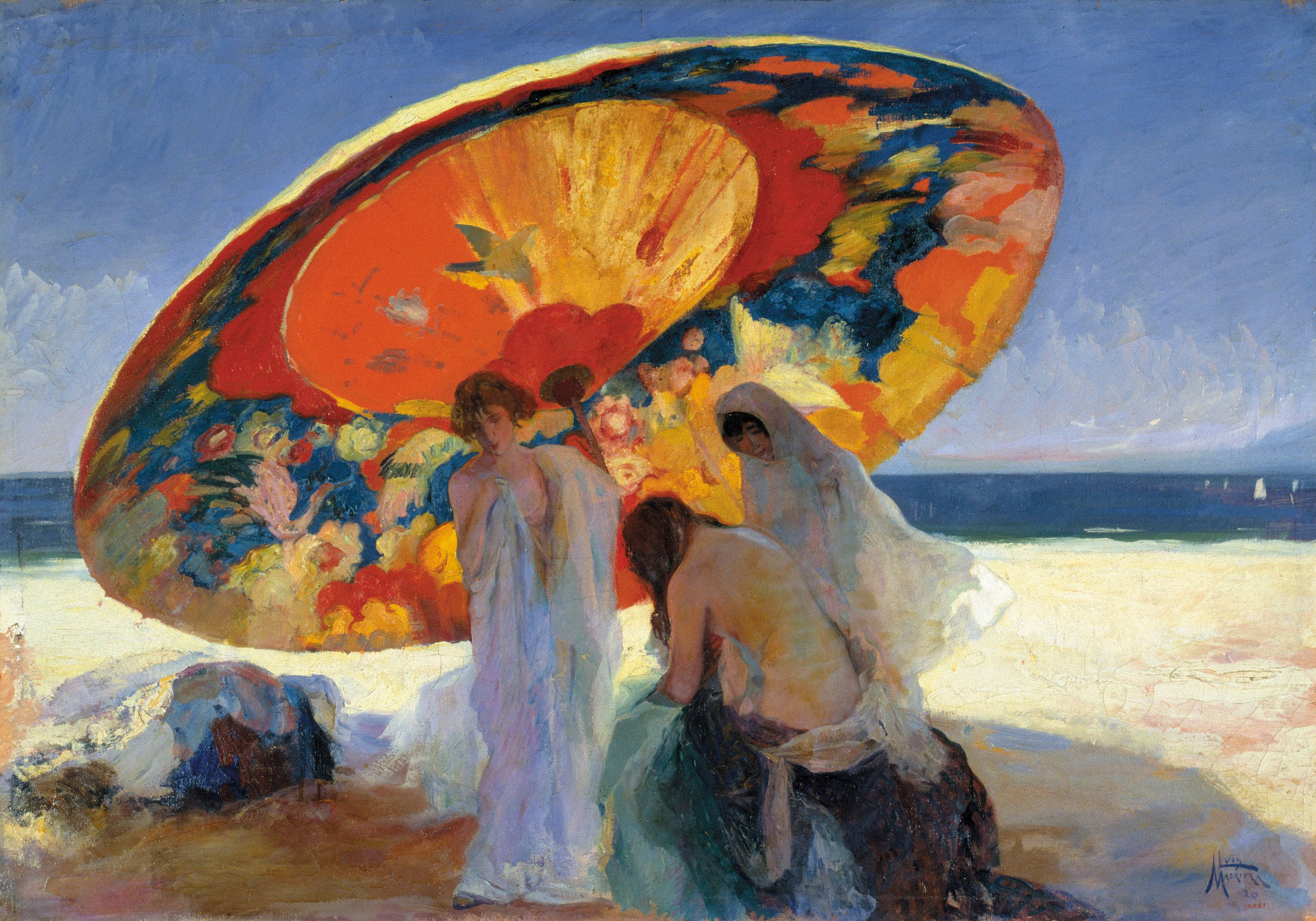
Reflected Shadows

Lluís Masriera i Rosés (1872–1958) was a Spanish jewellery designer.

== Biography ==
He was born in Barcelona in 1872 to the painter Josep Masriera, who was also a well-known silversmith and, along with his brother Francesc Masriera, ran the family jewelry business started by his father, José Masriera i Vidal.

Lluís Masriera started in his family's workshop and created pieces with the same aesthetic and precision that the workshop had always been known for; one which highlighted technical perfection but little creativity.

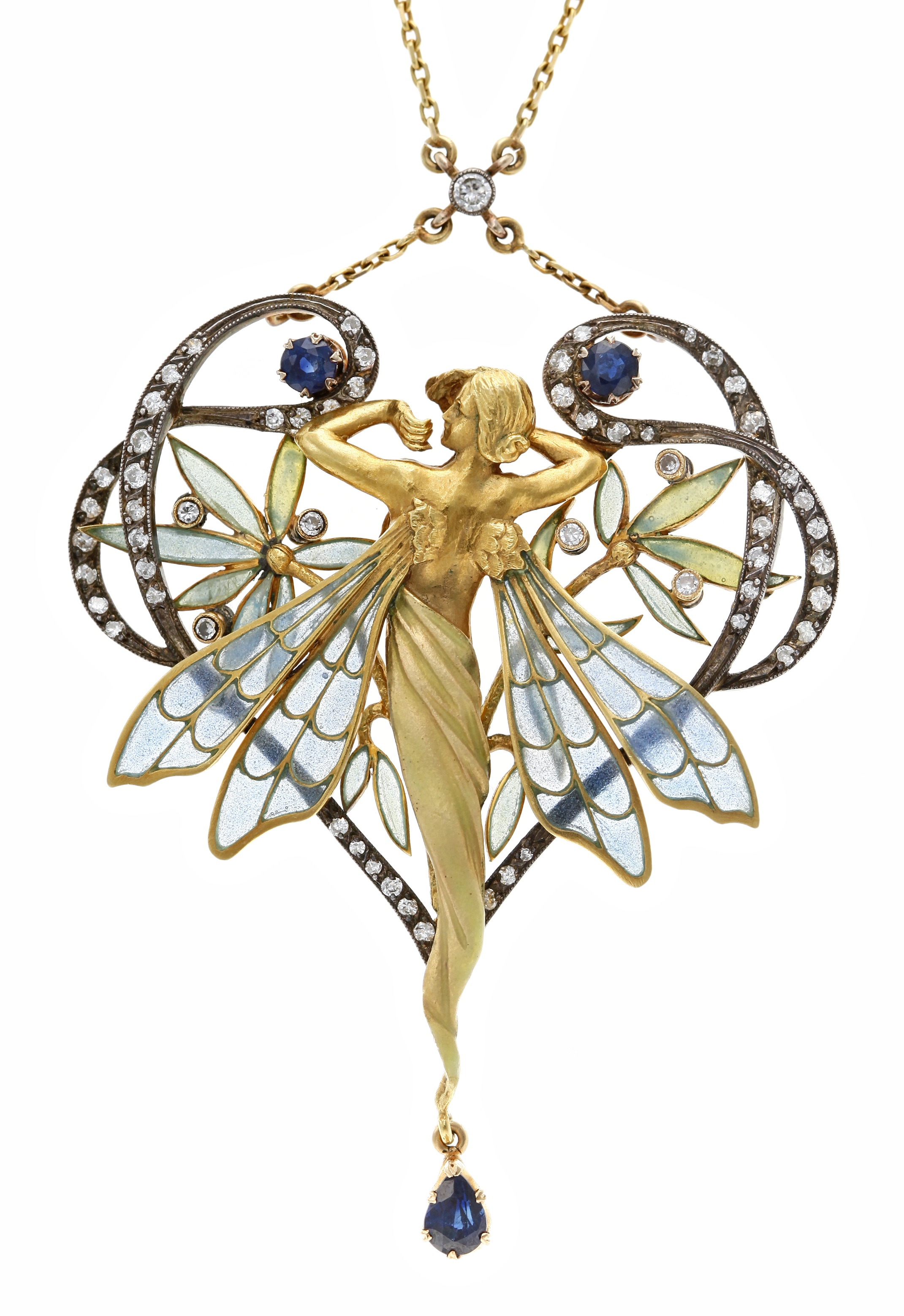
Necklace in the form of a nymph

=== Education ===
In 1889, Masriera went to study at the Academy of Beaux Arts in Geneva where he was taught by the enameller Edward Lossier.

The geographic positioning afforded him the opportunity to travel to Paris often and frequent the salons. It was in these legendary meetings that Masriera was introduced to the idea of Art Nouveau and the work of René Lalique.

=== Career ===
In 1900, at the age of twenty eight, Masriera returned to Barcelona and was named the new artistic director of the family workshop and changed the direction and style of the jewellery that was produced.

Inspired by Lalique's designs, Masriera melted down all the family’s existing jewellery stock in order to use the raw materials to redesign the pieces into his new style/aesthetic: Modernisme. The total inventory overhaul was completed in six months. The new collection debuted on Saint Thomas day in 1901 and the pieces "were immediately successful and sold out in a single week."

Masriera continued to create Modernisme pieces until 1913, when he stated in an essay, The Fall of Modernism, that "Modernism [was] dead."

After Art Nouveau had fallen out of favor, Masriera moved on to the Noucentisme school of design which embraced classical, timeless design elements until his death in 1958.

== Legacy ==
His work lives on today under the Bagués-Masriera firm, established in 1985. Today, the store sits on the first floor of an example of Modernisme in Barcelona, Casa Amatller on Passeig de Gràcia. The firm keeps Masiera's art alive by "continu[ing] to master the artesian techniques of translucent enamelling and fire enamelling."

== See also ==
- List of jewellery designers
- List of people from Catalonia
- List of Spanish artists
- Pendant with Saint George, design conserved at Museu Nacional d'Art de Catalunya, in Barcelona
