= Ramón Tusquets y Maignon =

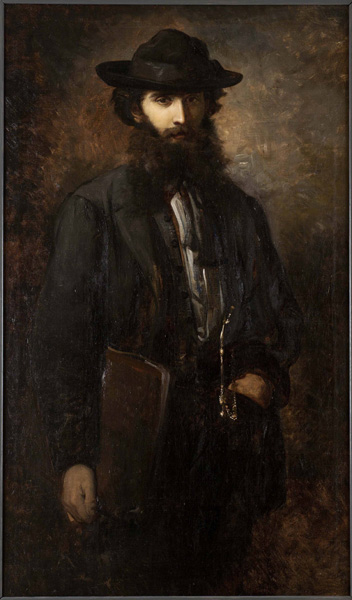
- Portrait by Ramón Martí Alsina (1867)
- Born: 1837; Barcelona, Spain
- Died: 11 March 1904 (aged 66–67); Rome, Italy

Raimondo or Ramón Tusquets y Maignon (Barcelona, 1837 - Rome, 11 March 1904) was an Italian-Spanish painter, known for his eclectic subjects, ranging from orientalist themes, historical compositions to genre scenes of the countryside in Campania.

== Biography ==
Tusquets was a son of a wealthy Barcelonese merchant who obligated him, in the first years of his adult life, to continue the family line of commerce. After his father died, Tusquets became an artist. He began his studies with a local artist named Ramón Moliné and shortly after, subsidized his own move to Rome, where he studied in the Chigi Academy and established relations with the circle of Catalan painters who were settled there.

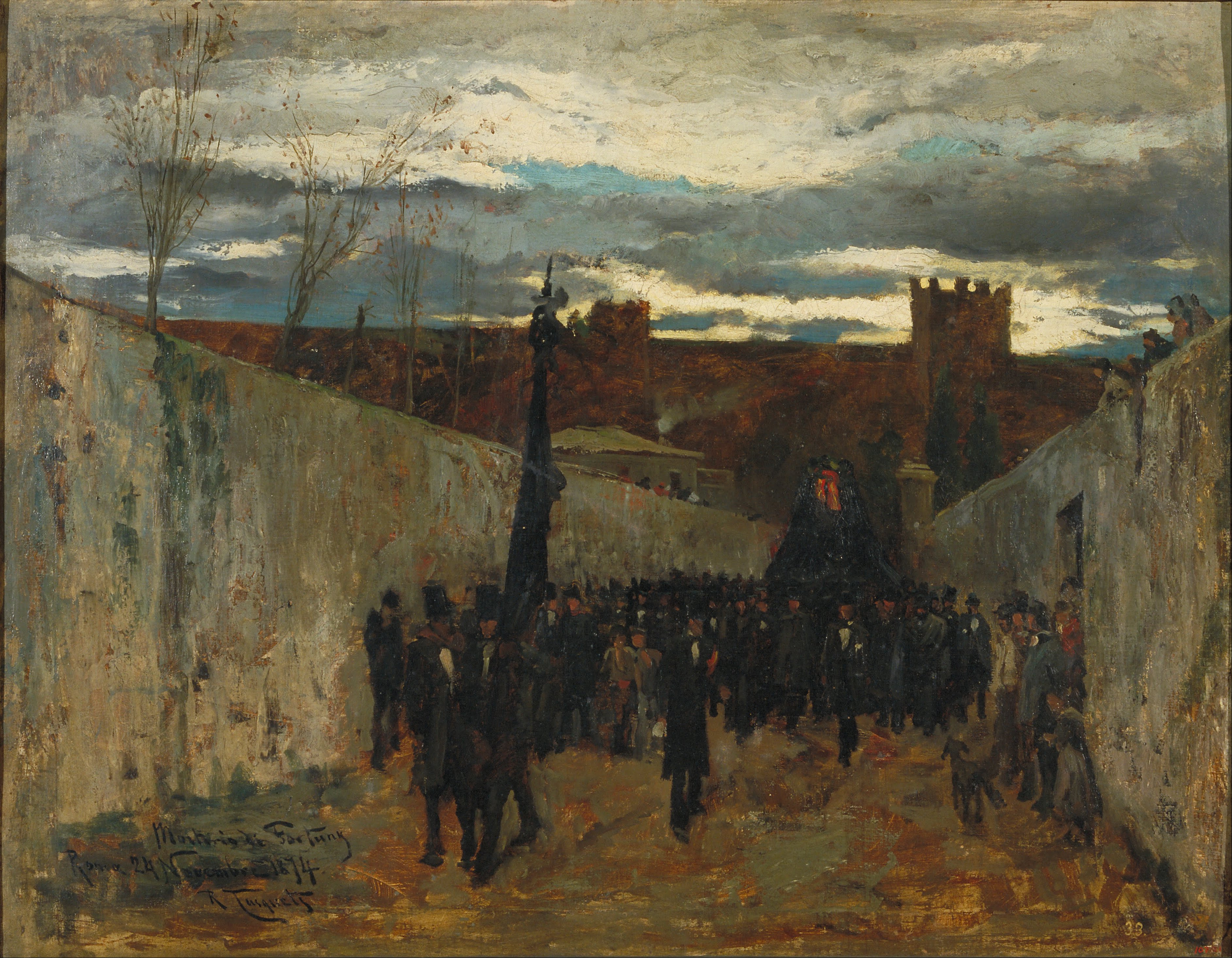
The Burial of Mariano Fortuny (1874)

While he remained in Italy, he never severed artistic links with Spain. In 1867 he sent to the National Exhibition a painting titled “El mendigo o Periódico” (The beggar or Newspaper) awarded a medal of third class. His exhibited in Spain throughout the last third of the 19th century. Thus, he got a medal of second class for his work Le Opere, campiña romana in 1871, took part in the Exhibition of Barcelona in 1867, and the International Exhibition of Fine arts of the Town hall of Barcelona in 1886.

But, simultaneously, his success in Spain and his foreign contacts allowed him to appear in the international exhibitions such as the one in Naples in 1877, where he won a diploma of honor with Al toque del Ave María, the Universal Exhibition in Vienna in 1876 or the one in Paris in 1878.

He was trained and for many years active in Naples painting in oil and watercolor. He mixed Spanish and Italian influences. Once in Italy, he became a close friend of the Spaniard Mariano Fortuny, who influenced him to paint orientalist themes, as well as the views of Rome and its surroundings. However, at the same time, the influence of Domenico Morelli and the group of Neapolitan School of Portici is also observed in his paintings. With time, his artistic ambitions within the canons of the epoch led him to great themes of genre and history.

In 1886, he painted five large canvas on Catalan history for the residence of Miguel Boada (Proclamation of the Prince of Viana, Fiveller and Ferdinand of Antequera, Embarcation of Jaime I to Mallorca, Roger de Lluria and the son of the count of Anjou y The Countess of Urgell asking for grace from the Count of Antequera).

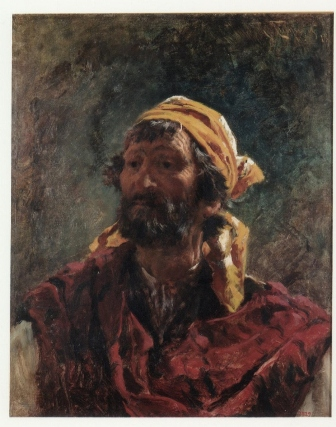
Contadino (Farmer, or Peasant) c.1886

He was nominated President of the International Artistic Circle of Rome and was asked to paint the official portrait of Queen Maria Cristina for the town hall of Barcelona. He later produced paintings like Después del Oficio del Pontificado (1888), Joven argelina (1891), Guardia suizo del Vaticano, and La fuga. His paintings were published in most important illustrated magazines of the time and exhibited on International Expositions. The Sala Parés of Barcelona dedicated an exposition to his works; he collaborated frequently with the publication “Album Salón”.

Among his works are: La fuga interrotta and La conca dell' Ave Maria, exhibited at Naples in 1877. At Turin, in 1880, he exhibited two oils, Il bosco and La laguna; and three watercolors: La befana, Svizzero del Papa, and Toilette.
