= Ladina (given name) =

Female given name

Ladina is a feminine given name in regular use in Liechtenstein, and the Romansh community in Switzerland. It may mean "woman from Latium" in Romansh.

== Notable Ladinas ==
- Ladina Jenny (born 1993), Swiss snowboarder
