= Pendant with Saint George =

Pendant designed by Lluís Masriera i Rosés

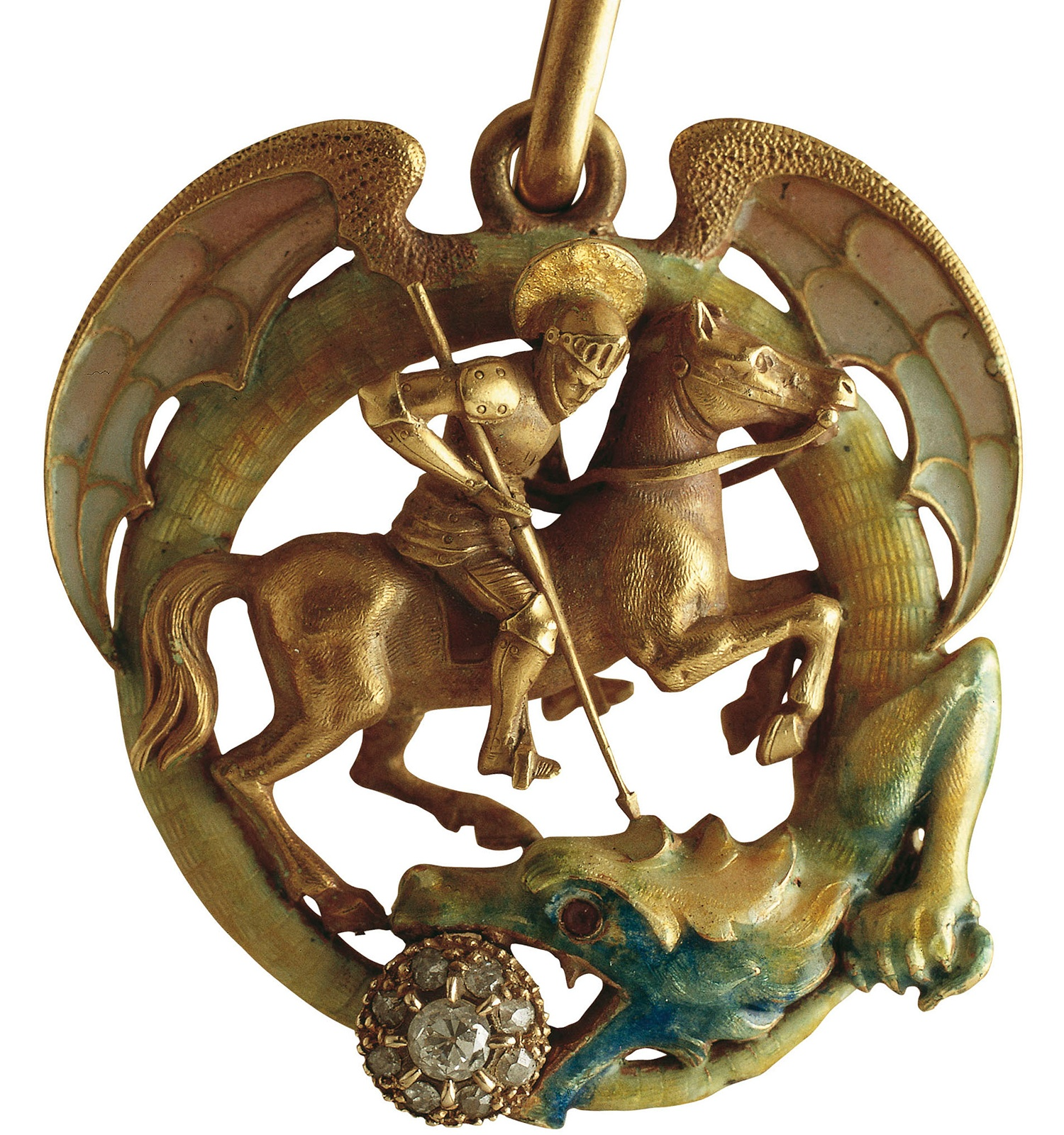
- Artist: Lluís Masriera i Rosés
- Year: 1901–1902
- Catalogue: 071983-000
- Type: Jewelry
- Medium: Cast gold, opalescent 'plique-a-jour' enamel, 'basse-taille' enamel, diamonds and rubies
- Dimensions: 4.6 cm × 3.6 cm × .8 cm (1.8 in × 1.4 in × 0.31 in)
- Location: Museu Nacional d'Art de Catalunya; Barcelona
- Website: http://www.museunacional.cat/en/colleccio/pendant-saint-george/lluis-masriera/071983-000

The Pendant with Saint George is a gold and enamel pendant designed and created by Lluís Masriera i Rosés, now in the permanent collection of the National Art Museum of Catalonia in Barcelona.

== Description ==
Masriera created this piece depicting the patron saint of Catalonia, Saint George, slaying a dragon in 1901-1902 after returning from the Exposition Universelle in 1900 where he decided to reinvent his entire manner of design including genre and style. The piece features the new staples of Masriera's Modernisme style including delicate gold work, plique-à-jour and basse-taille enamel work, and the incorporation of precious stones. The body of the dragon creates the form of the entire circular pendant highlighting, again, the themes of Art Nouveau by focusing on nature as the principal source of inspiration to create shapes and art. A single ruby creates the dragon's eye and it is holding six diamonds within its vicious maw. The dragon's body and wings are resplendent with delicate enamel work. By contrast, Saint George himself is an imposing figure wrought from unadorned gold, as is his horse. The pendant measures 4.6 cm x 3.6 cm x 0.8 cm and was purchased in 1966 by the Museu Nacional d'Art de Catalunya (National Art Museum of Catalonia) for their permanent collection. The pendant features in the Modern Art exhibit, which was renovated in 2014.

== The Legend of Saint George ==
There are many versions of the legend of Saint George but the most traditional tells the story of Saint George in Libya. Saint George travelled to Libya and, upon arrival, he happened upon a pond where a ferocious dragon lived. The dragon was terrorizing the country and, every day, to appease the mighty beast, the people had been feeding the dragon a sheep. When the town had no sheep remaining, the dragon had demanded that a young maiden be substituted and sacrificed to him each day. Saint George discovered that all the young girls, save one princess, had already been sacrificed. The king promised his last daughter's hand to any knight that could slay the dragon and break the cursed cycle. The next day, the princess was to be sacrificed, but Saint George sent her back to the castle and approached the dragon himself. The dragon, roused by the hoof beats of Saint George's horse, exited his cave. Saint George was not afraid and keenly moved under the dragon to strike him under its wing where there were no protective scales. The dragon fell dead and the town was saved.

Saint George was adopted as the patron saint of Catalonia in the 15th century as a mixture of celebrations: one part that adopted the legend as local lore, having occurred in Catalonia and not Libya, and the other, as an allegory for the battle between the early Christians and Moors in Spain.

== Modernisme ==
Modernisme (Catalan for "art nouveau") is the name given to the Art Nouveau movement in the Catalonia region of northern Spain. It is the equivalent to a number of fin-de-siècle art movements, such as Art Nouveau, Jugendstil, Secessionism, and Liberty style, and was active from roughly 1888 to 1911. The Modernisme movement was centered on the city of Barcelona, and is best known for its architectural legacy, mainly the work of Antoni Gaudí, but was also significant in sculpture, poetry, theater, and painting. In Spain, Masriera "made the only significant contribution known to date to Art Nouveau jewelry."

== Exhibition History ==
	Exhibition	Site	City
1964	Artes Suntarias del Modernismo Barcelonés	Palacio de la Virreina	Barcelona
1969	El Modernismo en España	Casón del Buen Retiro	Madrid
1985	Homage to Barcelona. The city and its art.	Hayward Gallery	London
1990	El Modernisme, vol. II	Museu d'Art Modern	Barcelona
