= Gabino Rey =

Spanish painter (1928–2006)

Gabino Rey Santiago
- Born: January 8, 1928; Marín, Spain
- Died: April 30, 2006 (aged 78); Barcelona, Spain
- Known for: Painting
- Children: Pablo Rey (son)

Gabino Rey Santiago (January 8, 1928 – April 30, 2006), known artistically as Gabino, was a Spanish painter. He was the son of the republican politician Agustín Rey Fonseca and father of the painter Pablo Rey.

== Biography ==
He was born January 8, 1928, in Marín, Pontevedra. In 1936, due to the Spanish Civil War, he moved from his native Galicia to Barcelona, from where he did throughout his career, important fact because it was influenced by the Catalan pictorial school.

Considered a realist painter, he worked all subjects of realistic painting, from the figures and still lifes, through the landscapes and seascapes, to portraits, which showed a prominent artistry.

In 1943, he was selected in the first Salón de la Juventud of Galeries Dalmau in Barcelona, where he won the first prize, consisting of a solo exhibition at the same gallery, this was the first official exhibition of the painter in 1945.

He was one of the painters of the Sala Parés Art Gallery of Barcelona, where he exhibited his entire life, from his first exhibition in 1957 until his death.

He exhibited in Madrid and Barcelona, as well as in London, Paris, and New York.

He died April 30, 2006, in Barcelona, Spain.
