= Sala Parés =

Oldest art gallery in Barcelona, Spain

Coordinates: 41.3826°N 2.1732°E

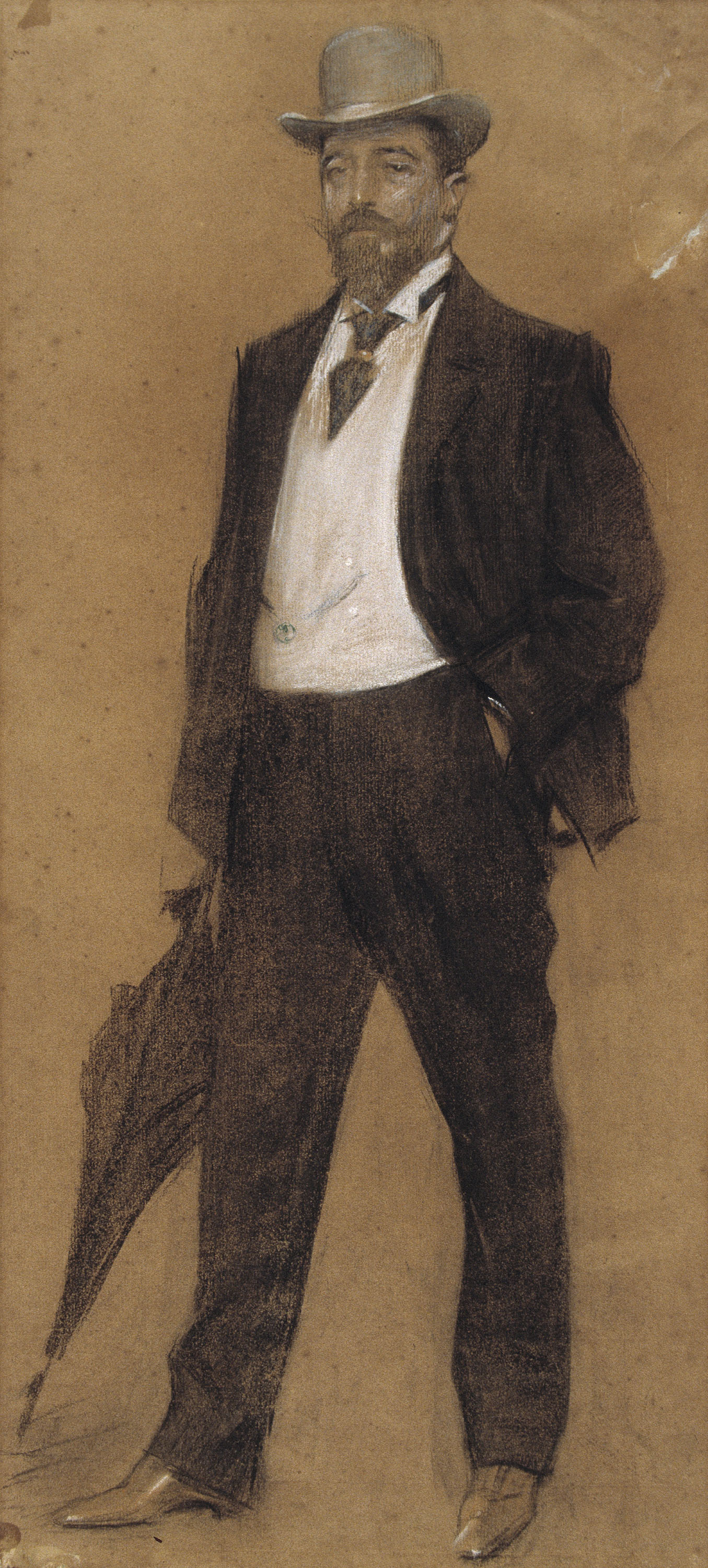
Joan Baptista Parés by Ramon Casas

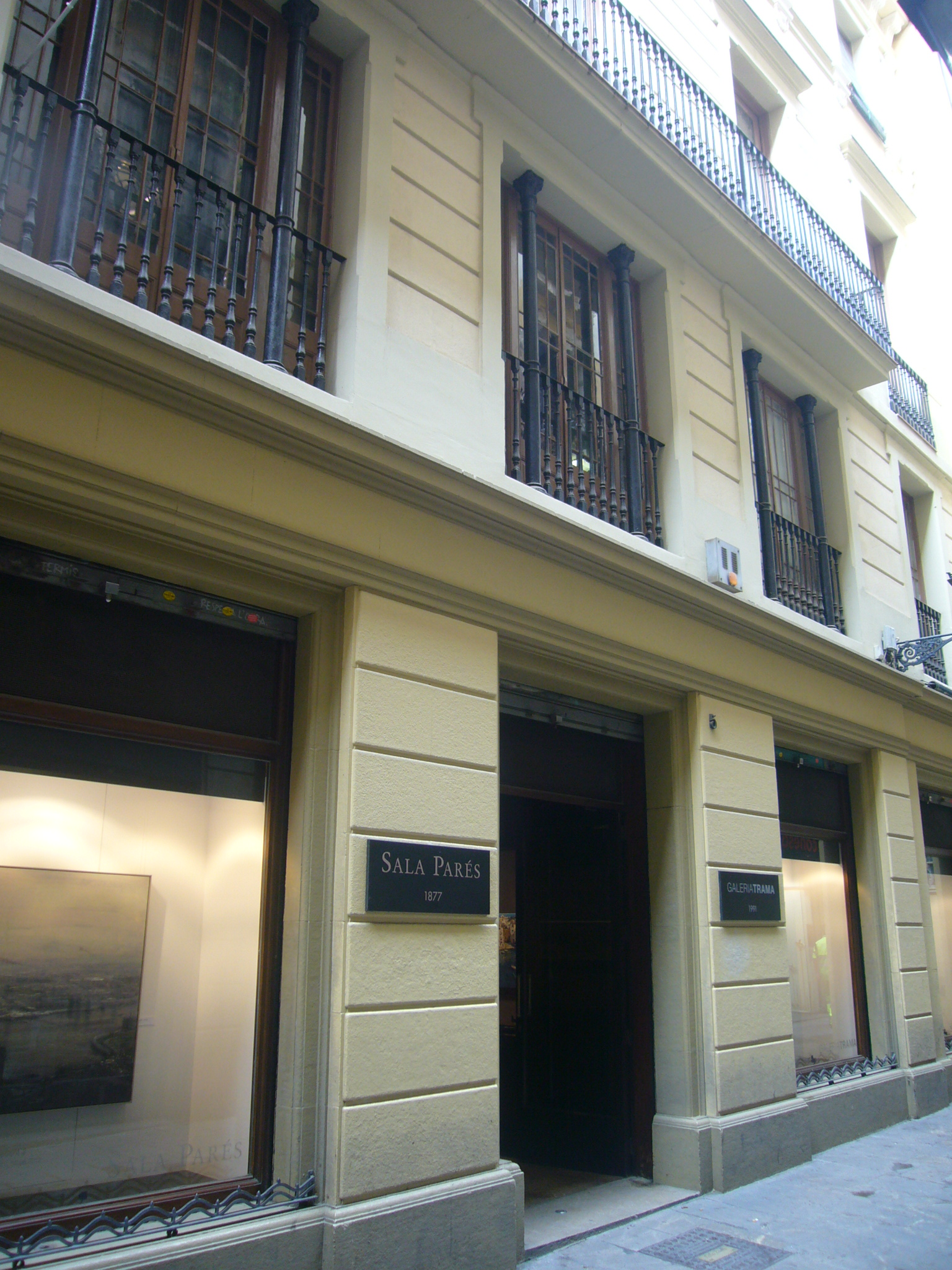
The Sala Parés in 2012

The Sala Parés is the oldest art gallery in Barcelona, Spain. Initially an art store, established in 1840 by Joan Parés, it slowly evolved into a gallery and formally became one in 1877.

== History ==
Founded by the original store owner's son, Joan Baptista Parés, an art collector, it became the primary artistic showcase for Barcelona during the "Febre d'Or" (Gold Rush), a period of rapid economic growth for the Catalan bourgeoisie. The artists who got their start there at that time include Modest Urgell, Romà Ribera, Josep and Francesc Masriera and Simó Gómez.

In the early 1890s, it became the home base for a new generation of Modernist painters such as Santiago Rusiñol and Ramon Casas. It also became the exhibit hall of choice for the Cercle Artístic de Sant Lluc. A decade later, it was home for the Post-Modernists; notably Isidre Nonell, Joaquim Mir and Marià Pidelaserra.

Parés himself showed no particular inclination for any artistic style and was quite eclectic in his choice of works for display. This eventually led to a decline in favor of other galleries with more specific orientations, such as the Faianç Català, the Galeries Laietanes (both devoted to Noucentisme) and the Galeries Dalmau (Avant-garde).

In 1925, it was acquired by the art dealer, Joan-Antoni Maragall, youngest son of the poet Joan Maragall. The gallery was completely redesigned and began to promote younger artists, including Josep Mompou, Alfred Sisquella, Manolo Hugué, Josep de Togores and Salvador Dalí. Auctions were also established and it became a major supplier of older paintings for museums. After World War II, although the gallery maintained its connections to the avant-garde, it also began to focus more on Postimpressionism and other relatively conservative styles.

A branch in Madrid, known as the "Swan Gallery" is operated by Maragall's son. In 2013, it was announced that a showroom would be opened in Shanghai, China.

Some of the artists represented were, Gabino Rey, Josep Roca-Sastre, Josep Serra i Llimona, and Simó Busom i Grau, among others.
