= Josep Masriera =

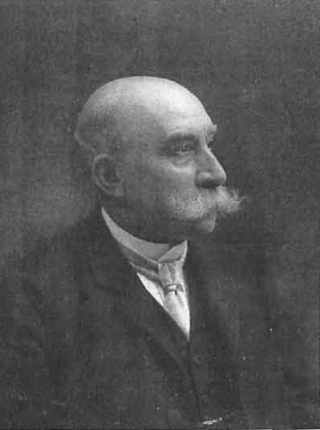
Josep Masriera; photograph by Pau Audouard.

Josep Masriera i Manovens (22 January 1841, in Barcelona – 31 January 1912, in Barcelona) was a Catalan landscape painter, goldsmith and businessman.

== Biography ==
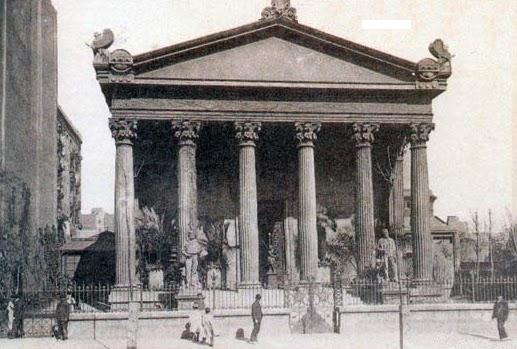
The Taller (workshop) Masriera in 1907

He was born to an artistic family and, together with his brother Francesc, began his training with his father, who was a silversmith. After finishing there, he was sent to study with Lluís Rigalt at the Escola de la Llotja. In 1857, he and his brother were apprenticed to Josep Serra i Porsón, a Professor there. Later, he studied with Claudi Lorenzale.

He was married in 1864 and eventually had five children, including Lluís Masriera, who also became a well-known painter and goldsmith. Shortly after, he and his brother were in Paris, where they may have worked with Alexandre Cabanel. In 1867, he was back at the Escola for some graduate courses and returned to Paris for the International Exhibition to see the latest trends in jewelry.

In 1869, he was appointed President of the "Guild of Jewellers and Silversmiths" and became Secretary of the liberal arts division of the "Association for the Encouragement of National Production", a protectionist group. In 1873, he was named an Academician at the "Royal Academy of Arts and Natural Sciences".

Between 1882 and 1884, he and Francesc built an elaborate workshop on Bailen Street, modeled after the ancient Temple of Augustus on Mont Tàber. It was designed by Josep Vilaseca i Casanovas. Flanking the entrance were statues of Eduardo Rosales and Marià Fortuny, created by Josep Reynés. The Masriera's combined art collections were kept there and it became a major cultural center, featuring dramatic performances as well as art shows. In 1932, it became the Teatre Studium and was later connected to the adjoining buildings. It is now a residence for the nuns of the "Petita Companyia del Cor Eucarístic de Jesús".

He served on the arts jury at the 1888 Barcelona Universal Exposition and was also an author of some note; publishing books on ornamental design, engraving, chiseling and oriental art as well as biographies of Lluís Rigalt and Claudi Lorenzale. For many years, he and some friends met weekly to create a "magazine" called El Recuerdo. No issues were ever published, but the manuscripts provide an important historical record of the art scene in Barcelona.

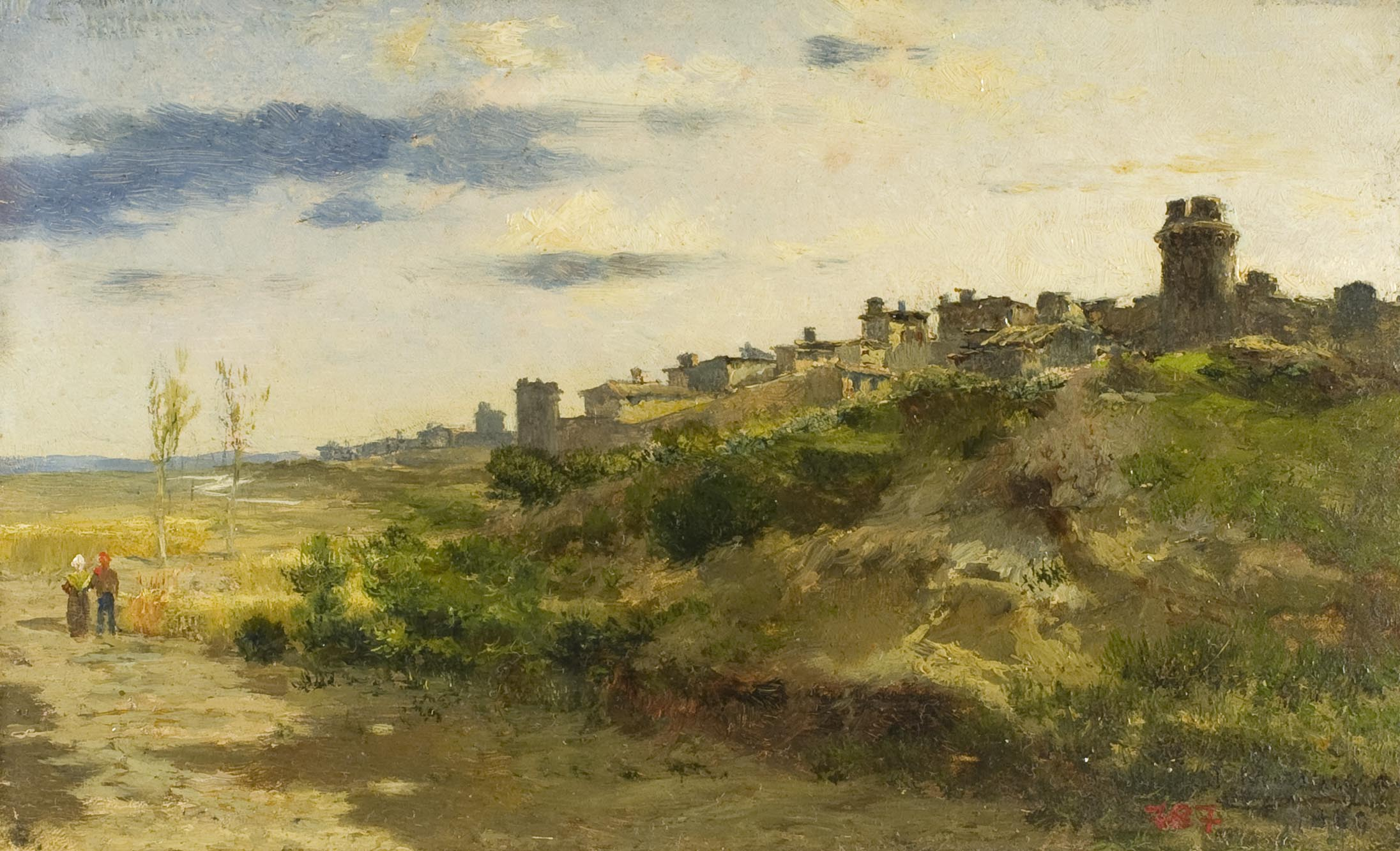
View of Hostalric.

In 1915, on the suggestion of his son Lluís, the Reial Acadèmia Catalana de Belles Arts de Sant Jordi created the "Josep Masriera Medal" for young landscape painters. It was awarded until 1962.
