= Francesc Masriera =

Spanish painter and goldsmith

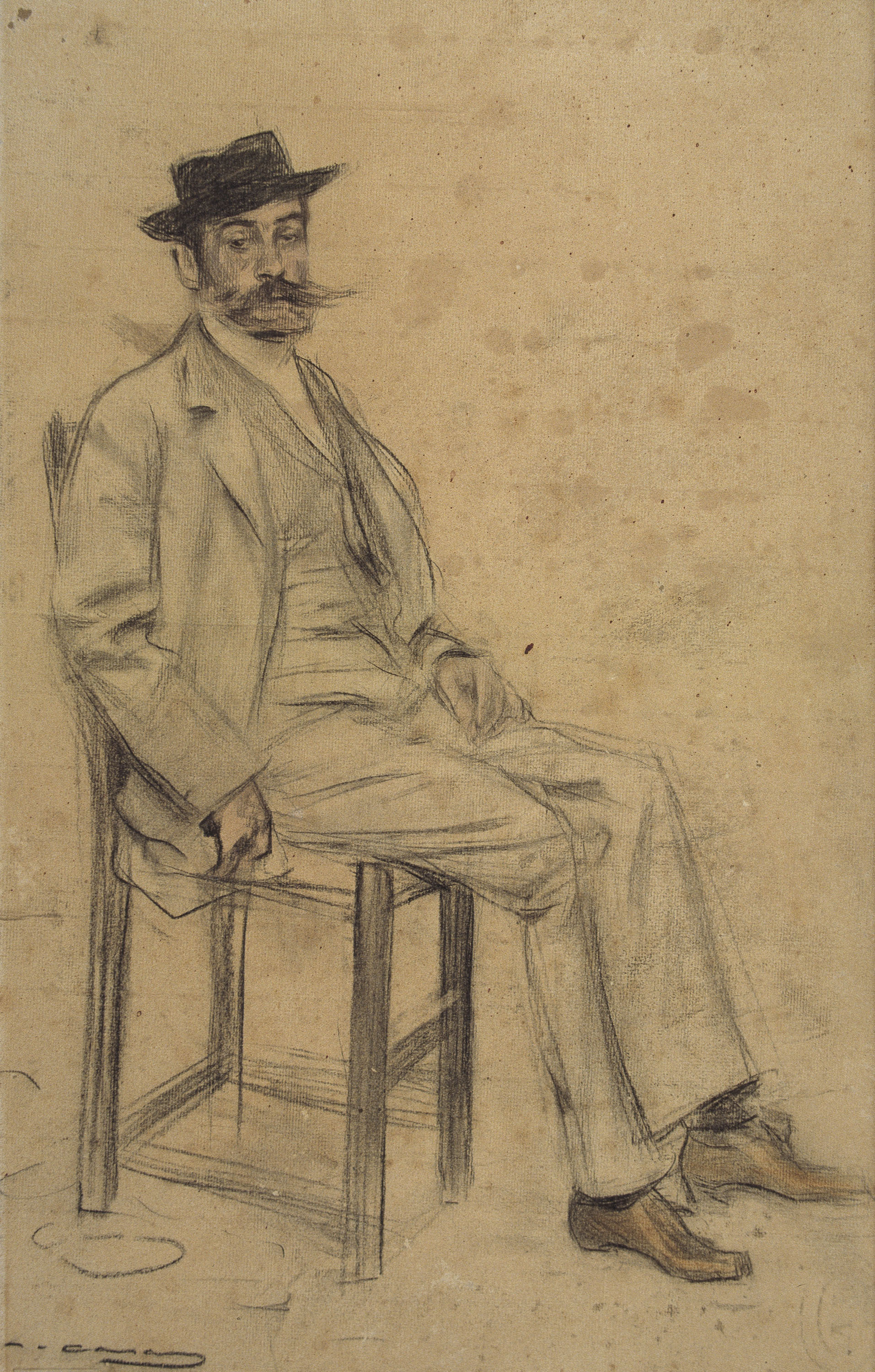
- Portrait of Francesc Masriera by Ramon Casas, date unknown
- Born: Francesc Masriera i Manovens; October 1842; Barcelona, Spain
- Died: 15 March 1902 (aged 59)
- Education: Apprenticeship with Josep Serra i Porsón
- Known for: Painter, writer and goldsmith
- Movement: Orientalist

Francesc Masriera i Manovens (21 October 1842, Barcelona — 15 March 1902, Barcelona) was a Spanish figure painter and goldsmith who was influenced by Orientalism.

== Biography ==
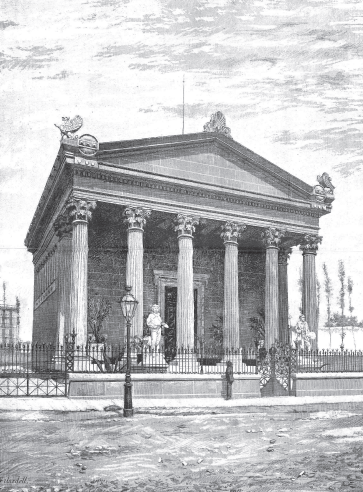
Taller Masriera, from La Ilustració Catalana (1884)

He was born into a family of painters, set designers and silversmiths and began his artistic training in his father's workshop. When he was only thirteen, he went to Geneva to learn the techniques for painting on enamel. In 1857, he and his brother Josep (who would also become a well-known painter) were apprenticed in the workshop of Josep Serra i Porsón, a professor at the Escola de la Llotja, followed in 1865 by a trip to London and Paris, where they may have briefly worked in the studios of Alexandre Cabanel.

He opened his first studio in 1871 and participated in the "Exposició General Catalana". The following year, he returned to Paris alone and established contact with Goupil & cie, one of the most important art dealerships at that time. He was awarded second prize at the National Exhibition of Fine Arts in 1878 with his painting "La esclava" (The Slave), which was later purchased by King Alfonso XII. In 1889, he was awarded a medal at the Exposition Universelle. For most of his life, he was active in the family jewelry business, Masriera y Hijos (later, Hermanos Masrieras).

Between 1882 and 1884, he and Josep built an elaborate workshop on Bailen Street, modeled after the ancient Temple of Augustus on Mont Tàber. It was designed by Josep Vilaseca i Casanovas. Flanking the entrance were statues of Eduardo Rosales and Marià Fortuny, created by Josep Reynés. The Masriera's combined art collections were kept there and it became a major cultural center, featuring dramatic performances as well as art shows. In 1932, it became the Teatre Studium and was later connected to the adjoining buildings. It is now a residence for the nuns of the "Petita Companyia del Cor Eucarístic de Jesús".

As a jeweler, he was well known for his use of Plique-à-jour, a notoriously difficult technique. He was also an amateur playwright and a regular contributor to a weekly "magazine", El Recuerdo, created by his brother Josep and his friends, but never actually published.

== Selected paintings ==
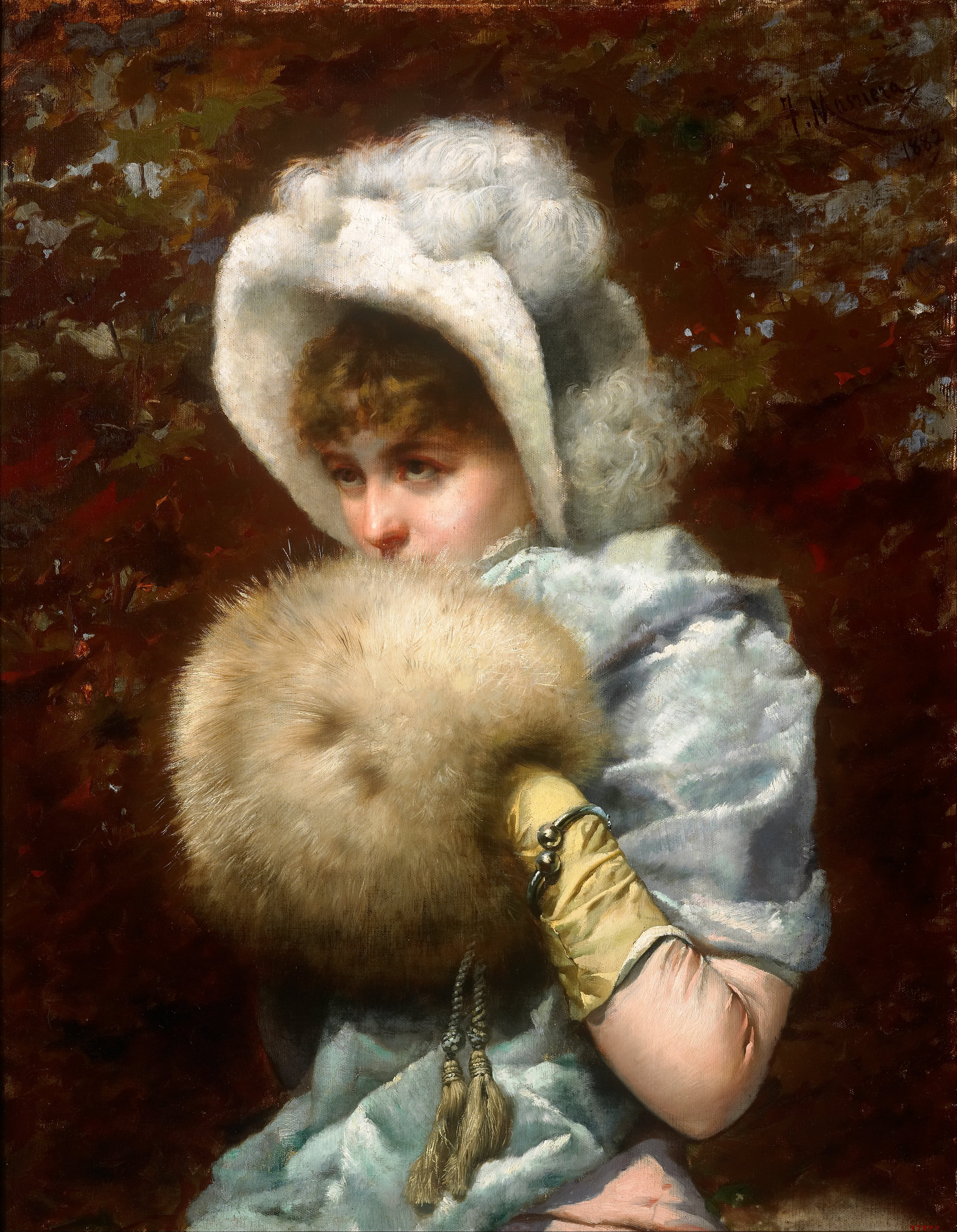
Winter (1882)

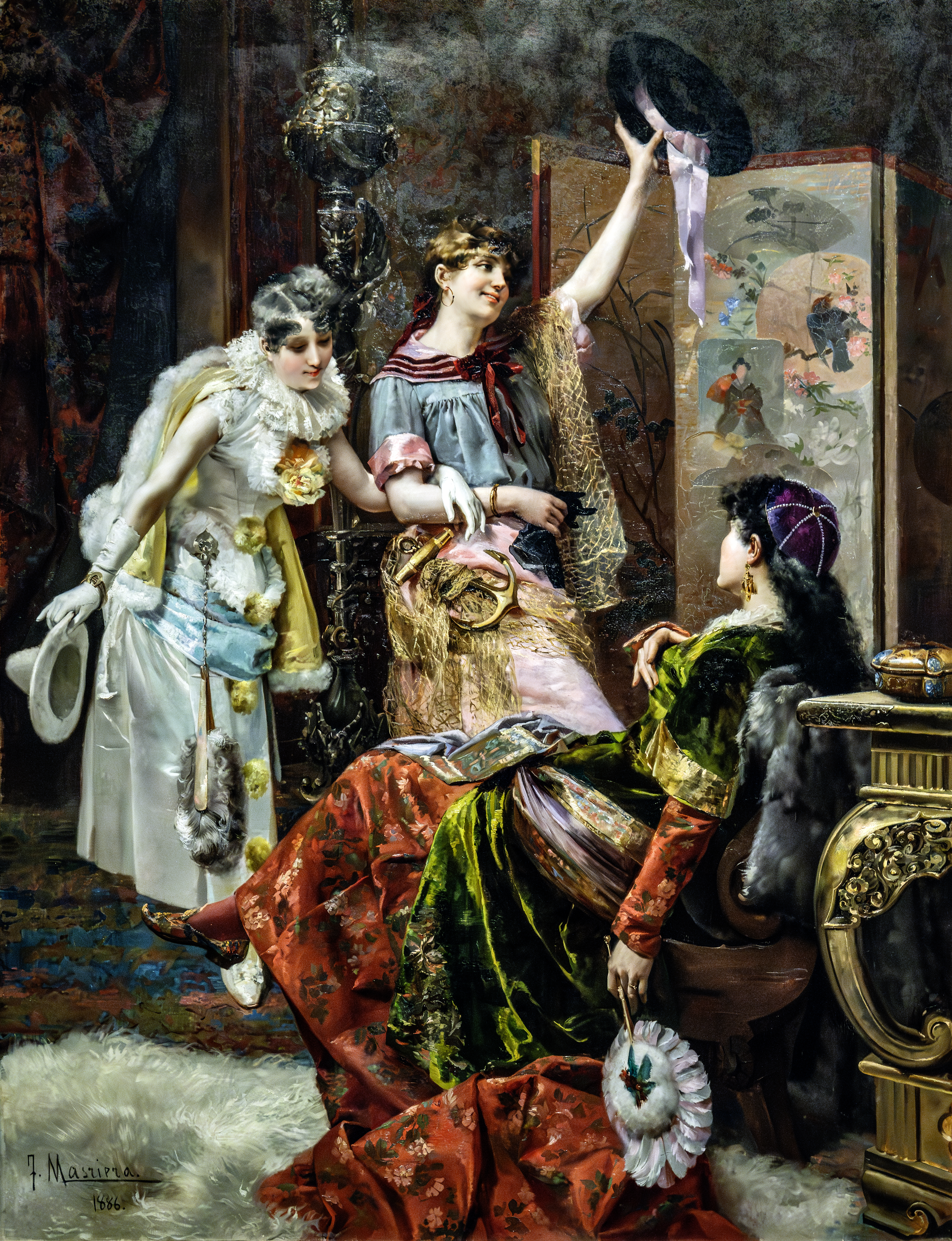
Before the Ball (1886) MNAC

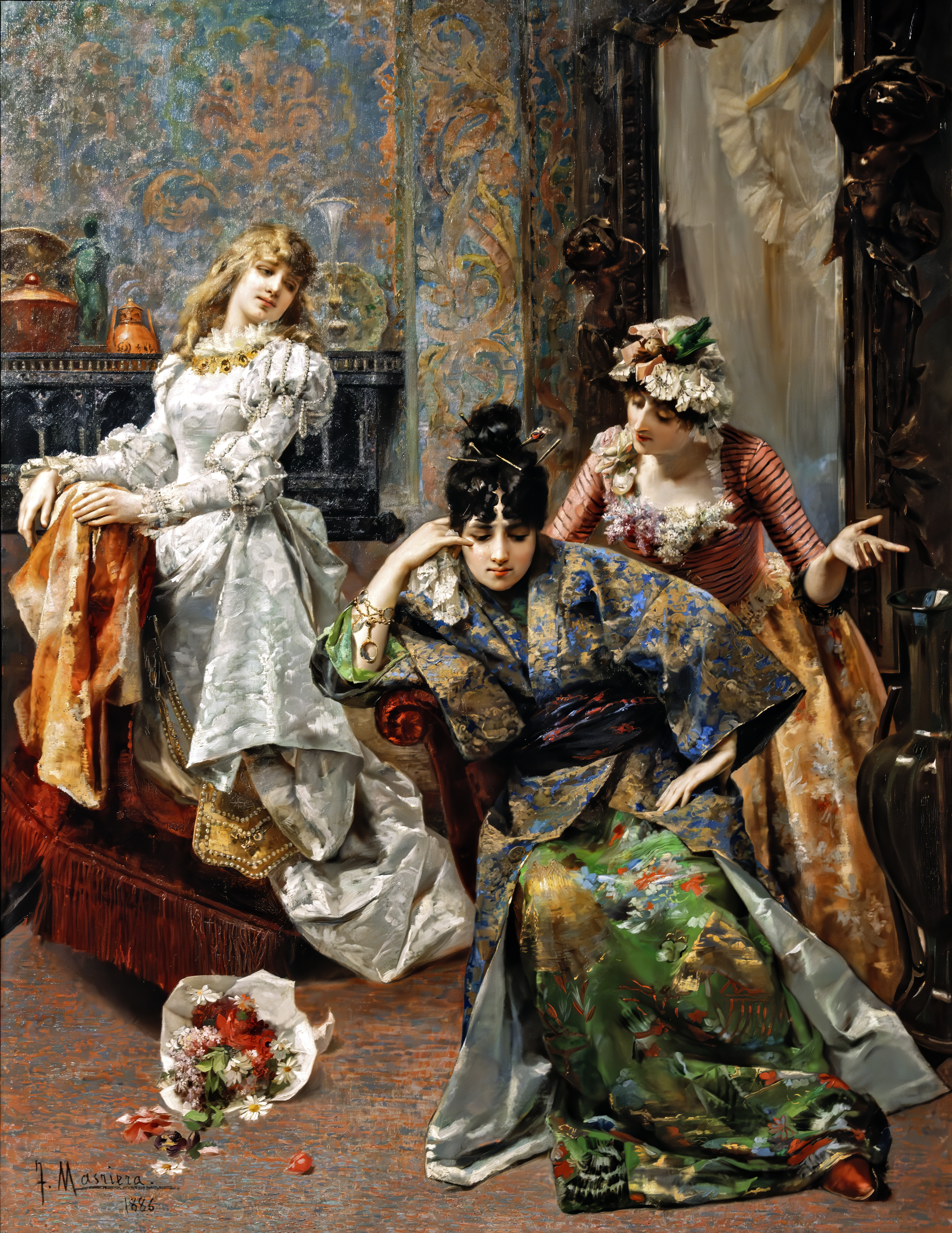
After the Ball (1886) MNAC

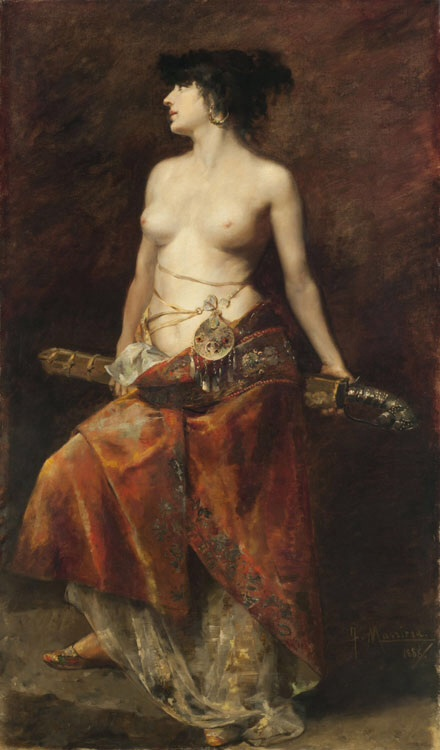
Salome (1888)

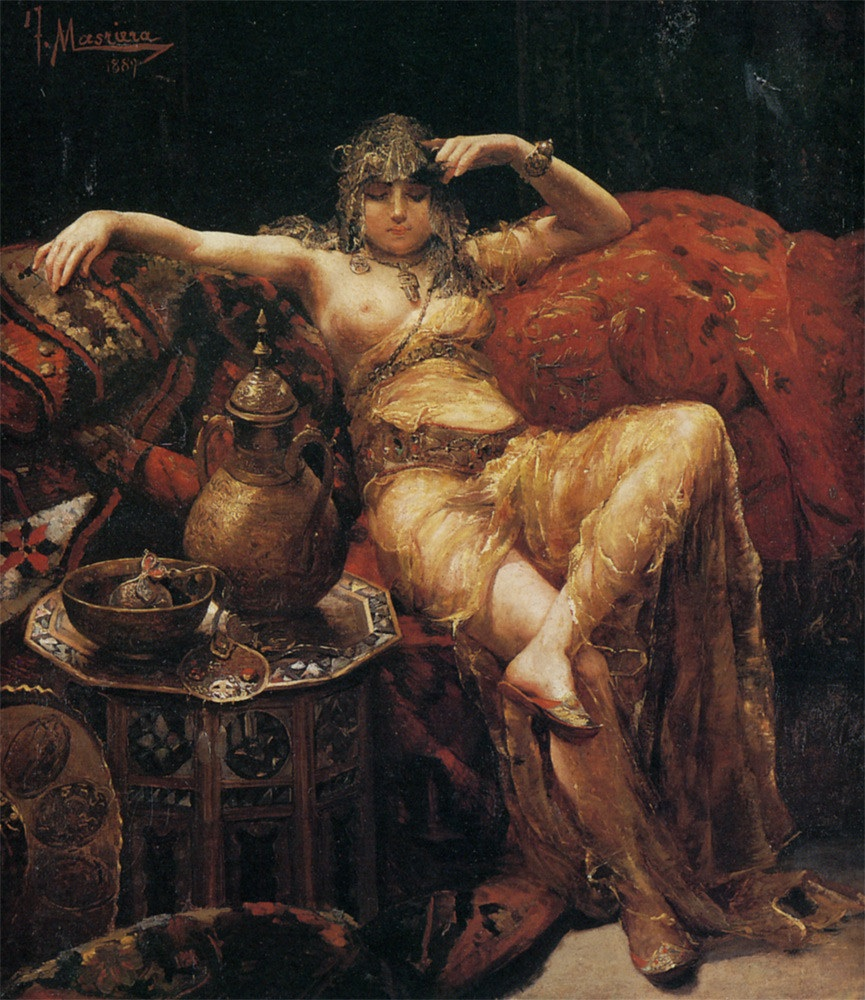
Harem Girl (c. 1890)

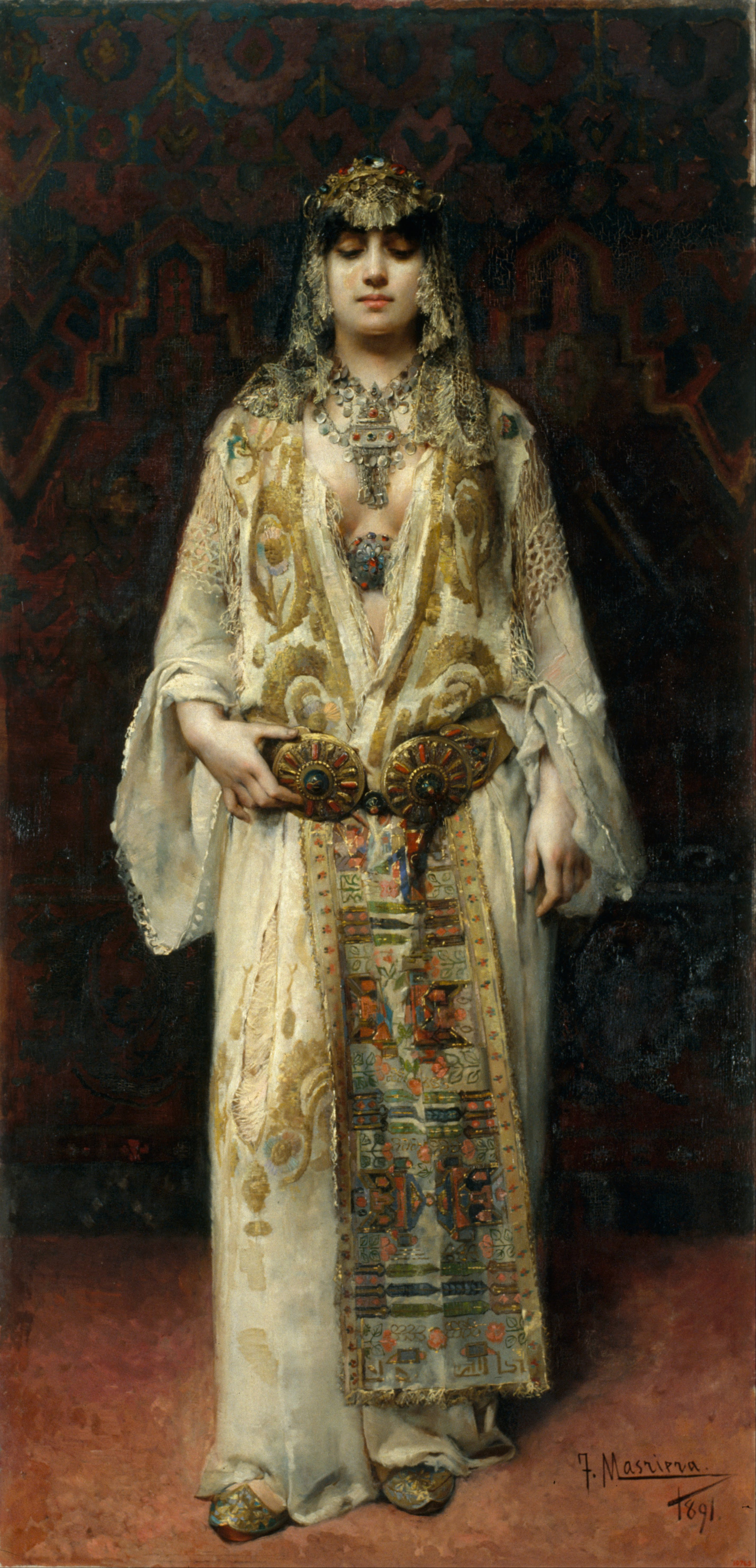
In the Presence of the Lord (1891)

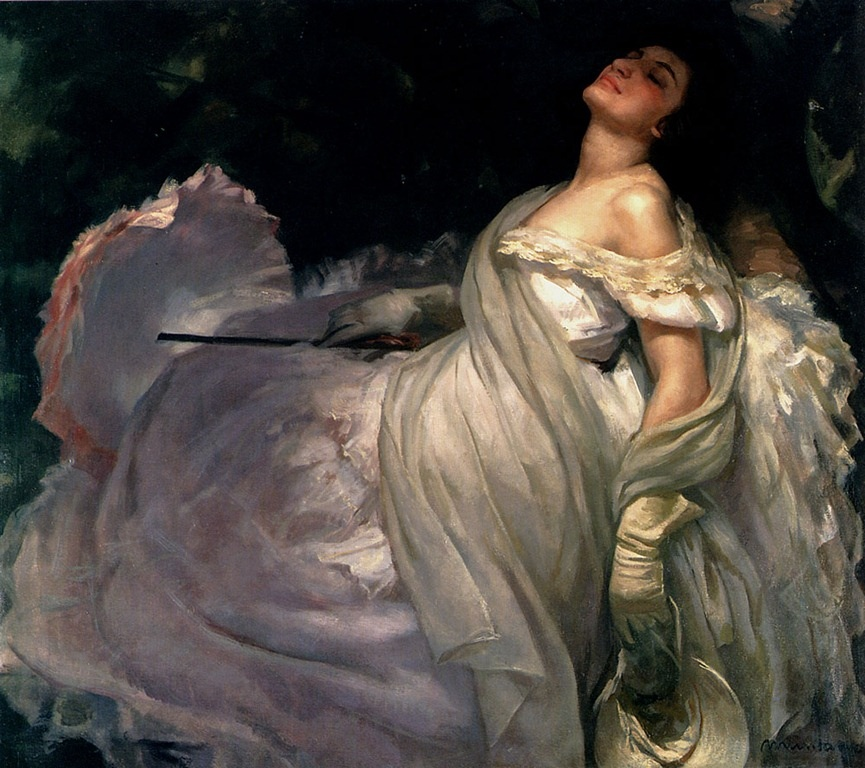
Reclining Lady (1894)

== See also ==
- List of Orientalist artists
- Orientalism
