= Pere-Enric de Ferran i de Rocabruna =

Catalan-Spanish composer (1865–1919)

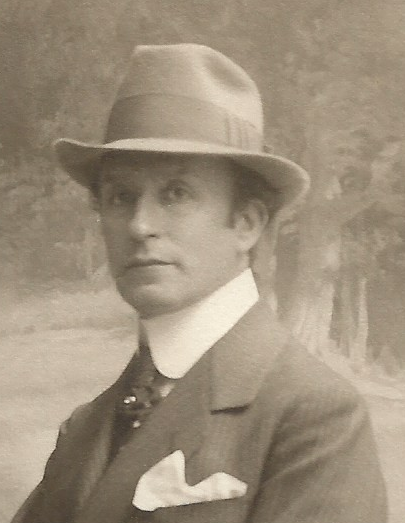
- Born: 2 June 1865; Barcelona
- Died: 6 November 1919 (aged 54); City of Brussels
- Occupation: Composer
- Style: classical music

Pere-Enric de Ferran i de Rocabruna (Catalan pronunciation: [ˈpe.ɾə ənˈrik də fəˈran ˈi də ˈrɔ.kəˈbɾu.nə], Barcelona, 1865 – Brussels, 1919) was a Catalan-Spanish music composer.

He received his first composition lessons from Rodríguez Alcántara in Barcelona, completing his studies with Enric Morera. He was considered one of the budding young musician of the modernist period. In the works he produced, he distinguished himself in his handling of instrumentation.

Among his works are an Andante premiered in Barcelona by the orchestra Crikboom; the stage works La Bodas de Camacho (libretto by Jacint Grau and Adrià Gual) and La Cegueta (libretto by Modest Urgell); the symphonic poem Le Soir (lyrics by the Belgian painter and poet Jean Delville); and Primavera, a work premiered in Brussels in 1914.

His published songs include Primavera, Berceuse, Au Rosignol; Ofrena, and Praeterita. Few remained unfinished after his death: Les amantes de Palerme, opera in three acts; Barnum, operetta and El Silfo, symphonic poem. His documentary collection, with scores of more than 80 works, is archived and cataloged in the Library of Catalonia.

== Biography ==
=== Personal life ===
Pere-Enric de Ferran i de Rocabruna (Spanish: Pedro-Enrique, French: Pierre-Henri) was born in Barcelona on June 2, 1865 (Note: In some sources it is incorrectly indicated that the composer's birth year is 1875. The correct birth year is 1865, as stated in his marriage certificate and in the catalog of the Biblioteca Nacional de España.) into a wealthy, influential family with noble roots.

His paternal grandfather was Andrés de Ferran y Dumont, a lawyer, founder of the Institut Agrícola Català de Sant Isidre. His father, Ignacio Maria de Ferran y de Ribes was also doctor of law, as well as professor of law and political economy. His mother, Petra de Rocabruna y Jordà, was the daughter of the Baron of Albi. When Pere-Enric was five years old, his mother Petra died, and when he was fifteen, his father Ignacio died, leaving Pere-Enric under the tutelage of his grandfather Andrés, who had a great influence on Pere-Enric, particularly in directing and boosting his education.

As a child he already showed interest and admiration for music, becoming a hobby that the family repressed, considering that music was an inappropriate dedication for the social position they held. The grandfather-guardian insisted that Pere-Enric study law and become a lawyer like his father and grandfather had been. Thus, Pere-Enric followed family plans and pursued a law degree, restraining and postponing his musical vocation.

By the end of the 19th century he married Francesca Finet i Pansas, who died shortly after and with whom he had no children. In 1901 he married Camila Sardà i Ballester, from a family from Reus, with whom he had six children.

In his private and family life, Pere-Enric de Ferran adopted options considered avant-garde or extravagant for the time, such as following a vegetarian diet, or having his children sunbathe naked on the rooftop of their house.

He lived in Barcelona, Brussels, Reus and Madrid, and died in Brussels in 1919.

=== Musical career in Barcelona ===
When he was 30 years old he abandoned the legal profession (it seems that he never practiced), and passionately devoted himself to studying music under the mastery of Melcior Rodríguez d'Alcàntara and Enric Morera. He developed musically in the environment of the artistic and musical Catalan modernist movement, which flourished in Barcelona at the end of the 19th century and beginning of the 20th century.

In 1902 he premiered his first work, Andante for bowed instruments, at the Novedades theater in Barcelona, by the orchestra of the Barcelona Philharmonic Society, an entity directed by the Belgian violinist and pedagogue Mathieu Crickboom, who was a great influence on Pere-Enric, as was also the violinist Eugène Ysaÿe, Crickboom's teacher and contributor to the Philharmonic Society. The press of the time highlights the good reception that Andante received from the public and critics.

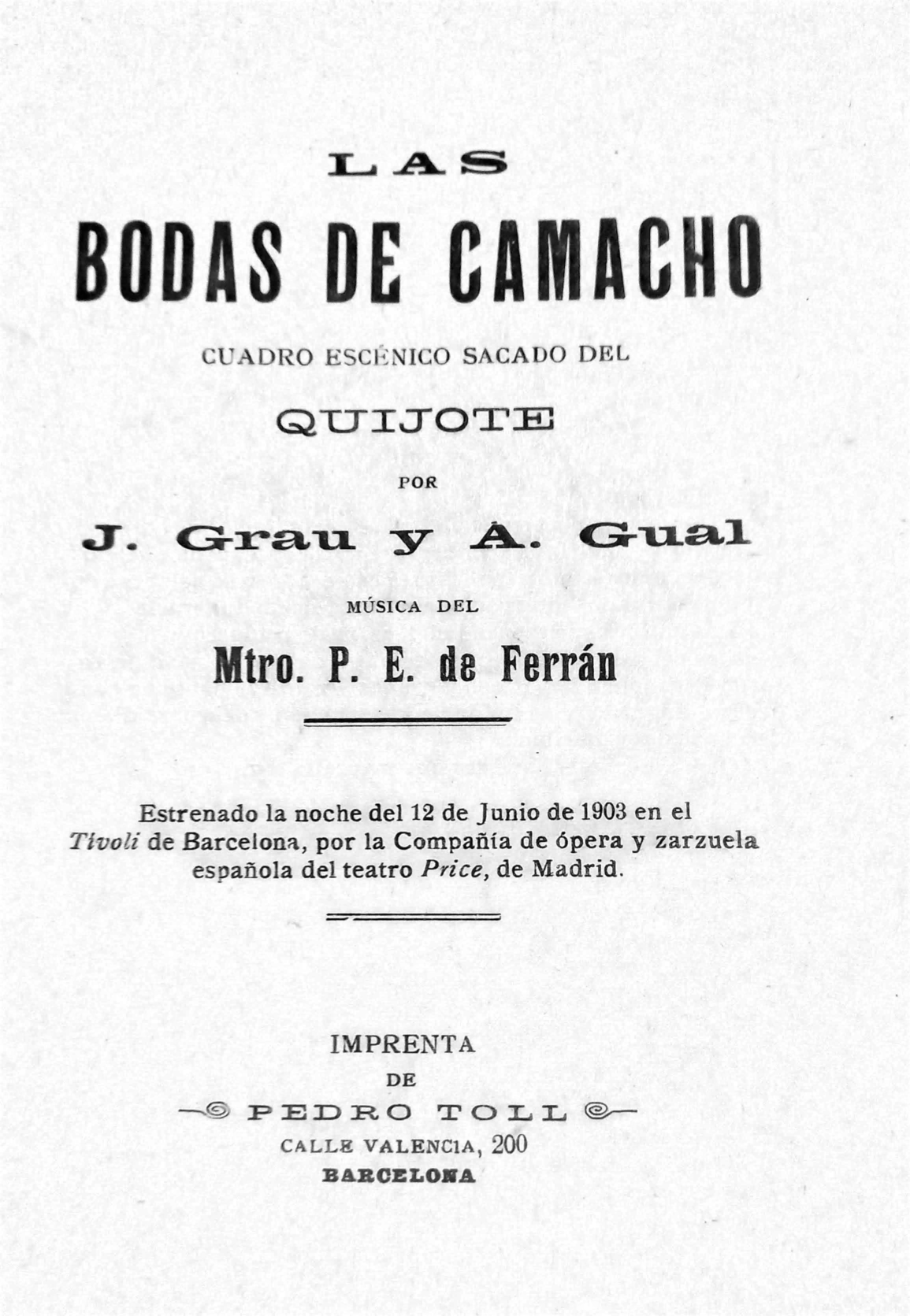
Cover of the libretto of Las Bodas de Camacho, Barcelona 1903

In 1903 the lyrical work Las Bodas de Camacho premiered at the Tivoli theater in Barcelona, with music by Pere-Enric de Ferran and libretto by Jacint Grau and Adrià Gual, based on an episode of Don Quixote. The reviews in the press highlight very favorably the quality and workmanship of the music, particularly spotlighting the prelude.

Between 1902 and 1910, Pere-Enric de Ferran set music to several lyrical plays, some of them framed in the Teatre Líric Català by Enric Morera, such as La Núvia, lyrics by Adrià Gual, and L' Eterna Lluita, lyrics by Enric de Fuentes. Furthermore, in 1909 he premiered at the Apolo theater in Barcelona the work La Canción de la Ninfa, with lyrics by Emilio Roig (pseudonym of Baldomer Gili i Roig).

He also composed choral pieces and songs for voice and piano. In all these pieces we find texts by relevant authors of the time, such as Apel·les Mestres, Modest Urgell, Jacint Grau, Emili Guanyavents, Jaume Massó, Enric de Fuentes, Paul Bourget and notably, the author and theater entrepreneur Adrià Gual, with whom Pere-Enric collaborated many times and had a friendship.

Particularly noteworthy are the songs with piano accompaniment A un Rossinyol, and the cycle of five pieces: Ofrena, Praeterita, Et veig per tot, Amor! and Primaveral; some of them were published by the editorials Universo Musical and Casa Dotesio (predecessors of Unión Musical Española).

During this period Pere-Enric de Ferran occasionally wrote music chronicles and reviews for some newspapers in Barcelona.

=== Brussels ===
In 1910, Pere-Enric de Ferran decided to move to Brussels with his family. As the composer explained in an interview, in Spain he did not find the artistic and musical environment that he needed for his creative ambitions, and he believed that art and music were much more appreciated in Belgium than in Spain.

This decision was probably influenced by the fact that two of his mentors had left Barcelona: Mathieu Crickboom had returned to Belgium in 1904, and in 1909 Enric Morera had moved to Argentina. The composer's eldest daughter Camila explains in her memoirs that the decision was also influenced by the rarefied political and social climate that Barcelona was experiencing after the events of the Tragic Week of 1909.

In Brussels he began to establish contacts and relationships to convey his creative activity; he undoubtedly received the support of Mathieu Crickboom, now professor at the Liège Conservatory, to whom he dedicated the romance for violin and piano Primavera, premiered in 1914 at the Théâtre de la Monnaie in Brussels, and published by Breitkopf & Härtel.

A very relevant friendship was the Belgian symbolist painter and poet Jean Delville, whose poem Le Soir Confidentiel was set to music by Pere-Enric de Ferran in what is probably his most celebrated work, the symphonic poem Crepúsculo (Le Soir), which in 1914 was being finalized for its planned premiere in Brussels. He also began a collaboration with the poet Maurice Boné de Villiers, with a libretto from which he began the composition of the opera Les amantes de Palerme.

Simultaneously, while he was in Brussels he served as correspondent in Belgium for the Barcelona newspaper La Vanguardia.

=== Back to Spain ===
At the beginning of August 1914, the first world war broke out, the German army entered Belgium and marched towards Brussels. Pere-Enric de Ferran decided to hastily flee with his family back to Spain, before the communication routes were cut off, taking with him the maximum of musical work that he could transport.

While the war lasted, Pere-Enric de Ferran settled in Reus, where he had the support of his wife's family (except for the first few months he spent in Barcelona, and a short period of residence in Madrid), alternating with frequent trips to Madrid, where he had introduced himself to the artistic and musical circles of the capital.

He resumed his musical activity, and in 1915 he presented at the Palau de la Música Catalana in Barcelona his romance for violin and piano Primavera, which he had already premiered in Brussels in 1914; the same piece was presented at the hotel Ritz in Madrid in 1917, with good reviews from critics in both cases.

His musical career culminated with the premiere in 1917 at the Gran Teatro de Madrid of the symphonic poem Crepúsculo (Le Soir), with lyrics by Jean Delville, a piece that the war had prevented from being premiered in Brussels. Performed by the orchestra Benedito and conducted by the maestro Rafael Benedito himself; it had a great reception, and the success was reflected in the musical reviews and chronicles of the Madrid newspapers.

He composed some solo piano pieces, such as Abril, dedicated to Andrés Segovia, he began the composition of the operetta Barnum with a libretto by Marc-Jesús Bertran Tintorer, started collaborations with Enrique García Álvarez and Alfonso Hernández-Catá for some operettas, he worked on a symphonic poem based on the poem Le Sylphe by Victor Hugo, and continued developing the opera Les amantes de Palerme that he had started in Belgium.

=== Return to Brussels and death ===
Once the war was over, and after waiting a reasonable amount of time for the situation in Belgium to stabilize, Pere-Enric de Ferran returned to settle in Brussels with his family in July 1919, and resumed contacts and work, with certain initial difficulties because during the war their home in Brussels had been looted and not only household items had been lost, but also musical documentation left behind when they hurriedly fled.

Unfortunately, on November 6, 1919, less than four months after his return to Brussels, Pere-Enric de Ferran died suddenly at the age of 54, the victim of a heart attack. He did not get to know his youngest daughter Genoveva, who was born just 8 days after the death of his father.

=== Legacy ===
He left unfinished the opera Les Amantes de Palerme, libretto by Maurice Boné de Villiers, the operetta Barnum, libretto by Marc-Jesús Bertran Tintore and the symphonic poem Le Sylphe on a poem by Victor Hugo.

The fact that he had died outside of Spain, where he was beginning to be recognized and appreciated, and his widow decided to stay in Belgium, when the country was still recovering from the ravages of the war, caused the work of Pere-Enric de Ferran to stop being programmed and promoted.

The composer's personal archive, containing most of the scores of his works, was kept for more than 70 years, first by his widow and later by his daughters; in 2005 the archive was transferred to the Library of Catalonia, where it is inventoried and catalogued.

== Works ==
List of the most relevant works by Pere-Enric de Ferran, with indication, where appropriate, of the premiere and publication data.

=== Symphonic Orchestra ===
Crepúsculo (Le Soir)
Symphonic poem for orchestra and voice (soprano).
Lyrics by Jean Delville.
Premiered at the Gran Teatro de Madrid on April 15, 1917.
Orchestra Rafael Benedito.

La Bodas de Camacho
Stage work based on an episode of Don Quixote.
Libretto by Jacint Grau and Adrià Gual.
Premiered at the Tivoli theater in Barcelona on June 12, 1903.
Lyrical company of the Teatro Price in Madrid.

La Canció de la Ninfa
Stage work with libretto by Baldomer Gili i Roig.
Premiered at the Apolo theatre in Barcelona on June 26, 1909.

=== String Orchestra ===
Andante for bowed instruments
Premiered at the Novedades Theater in Barcelona on June 22, 1902.
Orchestra of the Barcelona Philharmonic Society.
Conductor: Domènec Mas y Serracant.
Violin: Mathieu Crickboom.

Berceuse
Published in 1910 by Imprenta y Litografía Blasi, Barcelona.

=== Violin and Piano ===
Primavera
Dedicated to Mathieu Crickboom.
Premiered in 1914 at the Théatre Royal de la Monnaie in Brussels, in 1915 at the Palau de la Música Catalana in Barcelona, and in 1917 in the Hotel Ritz in Madrid.
Published in 1913 by Breitkopf & Härtel, Brussels.

=== Vocal and piano ===
Au Rossignol
Lyrics by Emili Guanyavents.
Published in 1902 by Universo Musical, Barcelona.

Ofrena
Lyrics by Enric de Fuentes.
Published in 1912 by Sociedad Anónima Casa Dotesio, Barcelona.

Praeterita
Lyrics by Paul Bourget.
Published in 1912 by Sociedad Anónima Casa Dotesio, Barcelona.

Et veig per tot
Lyrics by Adrià Gual.

Amor!
Lyrics by Adrià Gual.

Primaveral
Lyrics by Jaume Terri.

Tu pupila es azul
Lyrics by Gustavo Adolfo Bécquer.
Dedicated to Antonio Tirabassi .

=== Choral music ===
Cançó d'Agost
Lyrics by Apel·les Mestres.

Celístia
Lyrics by Emili Guanyavents.

Muntanyes
Lyrics by Jaume Massó.

Muntanyes del Canigó

=== Piano solo ===
Abril
Dedicated to Andrés Segovia.

Tendre Aveu
Waltz.
