= Ricardo Urgell Carreras =

Catalan painter (1873–1924)

Ricardo Urgell Carreras (in Catalan, Ricard Urgell i Carreras) (Barcelona, 1873-1924) was a Spanish painter. He was the son of modernist landscape painter Modest Urgell.

== Career ==
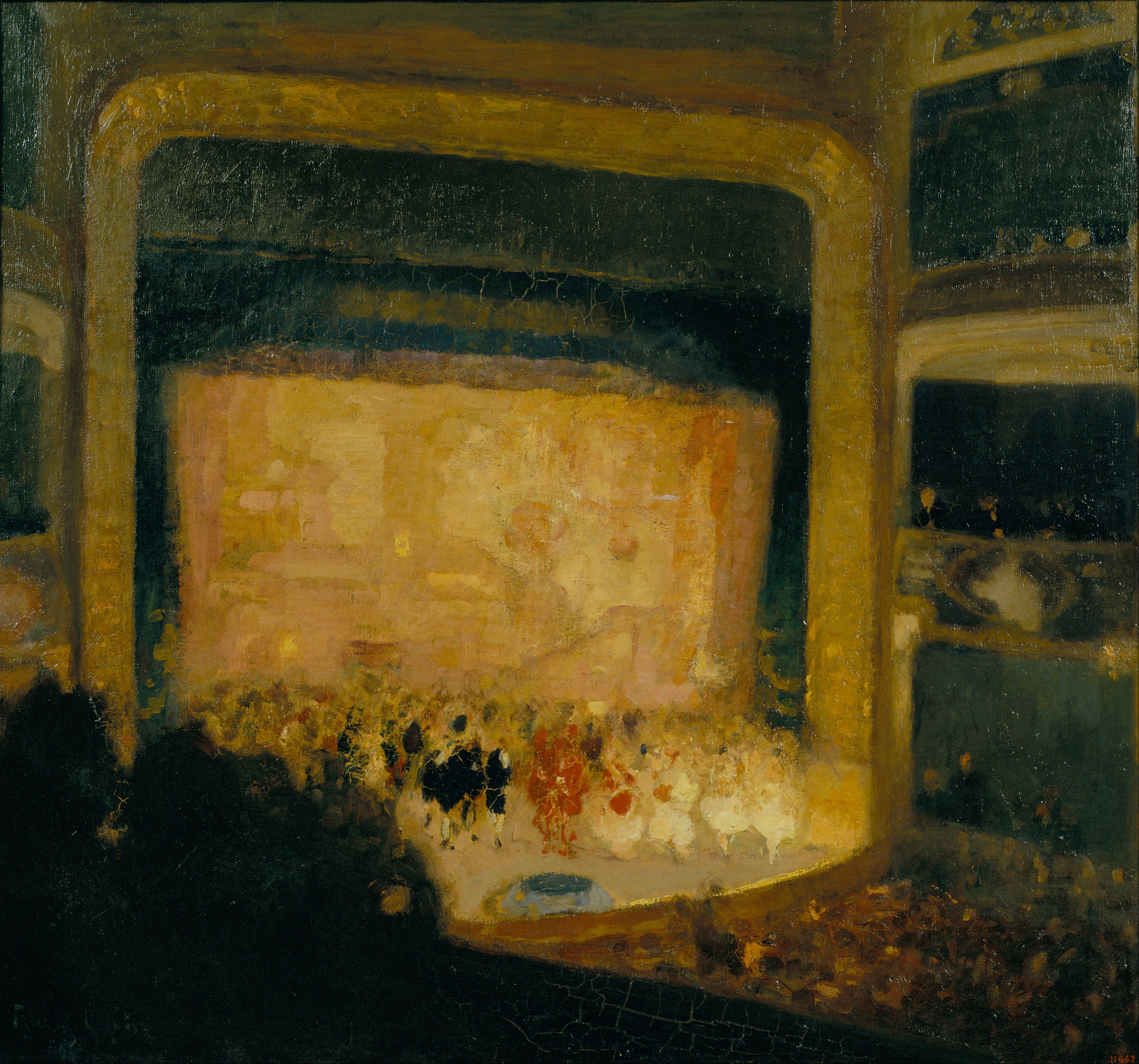
Ricard Urgell - Opera - Google Art Project

Born in Barcelona, his artistic training began in his father's workshop. In 1888 he exhibited his art for the first time in the art section of the Universal Exhibition of Barcelona, and at the end of that same year he exhibited in the Sala Parés in Barcelona. This would be the first of a long series of exhibitions in that gallery throughout his life.

In 1895 he became a student at the School of the Lonja of Barcelona. That same year he won a second medal in the Exhibition of Plants and Flowers of his hometown. In 1897 he exhibited at the National Exhibition of Fine Arts in Madrid, winning a third medal with his work entitled "Gaudeamus".

In 1900 he participated in the first exhibition of the Societat Artistica i Literària de Catalunya, a commercial artistic group promoted by his father and painters Lluís Graner and Enric Galwey. The following year Carreras was appointed as auxiliary professor in the School of the Lonja of Barcelona. In 1903 he married Rosa Esplugas, daughter of one of the most important local photographers, Antonio Esplugas. In 1906, his son Josep Maria Urgell was born.

In 1907 he won a second medal at the International Exhibition of Fine Arts in Barcelona, with one of his most ambitious works, the title of which can be translated in English as "In the early hours of the market". Also, in 1908, he obtained an honorable mention in the National Exhibition of Beautiful Arts of Madrid, and a third medal in the edition of 1910. He also won third medal in the International Exhibition of Buenos Aires in 1910 with his work "El bolsín".

He won a medal at the Universal Exhibition of Brussels and at the Hall of the Société des Artistes Français of Paris. In 1911, he won the highest decoration in the VI Exhibition of Beautiful Arts of Barcelona, with the painting titled "La filla del carboner". He also exhibited in various spaces in Barcelona (Sala Parés, Cercle Artístic, Galeries Laietanes, etc.), in London, Pittsburgh and Madrid. He was chosen as one of the artists to participate in the great art exhibition from Spanish Baroque to the present day, held at the Royal Academy of London. In 1923, he was granted a special room in the Spring Exhibition organized by the Barcelona City Council, with a unanimous critical reception.

He died in Barcelona, in his house in the San Gervasio neighborhood.

== Reception ==
His work is being reassessed by modern critics; earlier critics viewed him as an artist of second rank. His work is held in different museums, including the National Museum of Art of Catalonia and the Víctor Balaguer Museum & Library.
