= Matons =

Matons is a surname. Notable people with the surname include:

- Fidel Roig Matons (1887–1977), Catalan painter and musician
- Laureano Fuentes Matons (1825–1898), Cuban composer and violinist
