= Modest Urgell =

Spanish painter

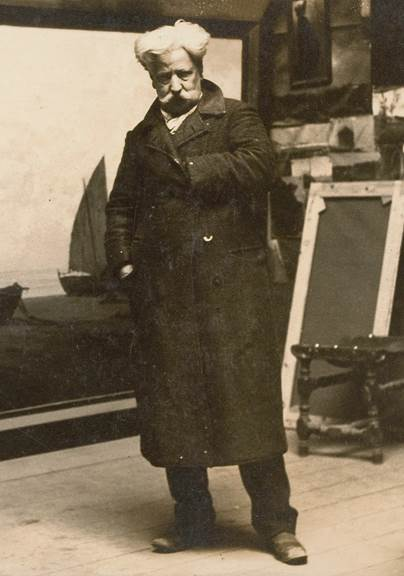
Modest Urgell in his studio (1903)

Modest Urgell i Inglada, also known by the nickname Katúfol (13 June 1839, Barcelona - 3 April 1919, Barcelona) was a Spanish landscape painter and comic playwright. He used his nickname for cartoons and illustrations.

== Biography ==
He was born to a wealthy family. In his youth, he was interested in the theater and participated in several amateur companies, but his family did not want him to associate with actors, so he agreed to study painting instead.

He studied at the Escola de la Llotja with Ramón Martí Alsina, Claudi Lorenzale and Lluís Rigalt. During the 1860s, he attempted to show his works in exhibitions at the Escola, but they were rejected. He exhibited in Madrid, instead, but with very little success. In 1868, he made a trip to Paris where he spent some time with Gustave Courbet and was influenced by the Barbizon school.

In 1870, there was a yellow fever outbreak in Barcelona, so he went to Olot, where he joined with Antoni Caba and a friend from the Escola, Joaquim Vayreda, to create landscapes en plein air. While there, he decided to devote himself exclusively to that genre.

After the creation of the Sala Parés in 1877, he exhibited there regularly. His works also received positive critical attention at the National Exhibitions in 1876, 1892 and 1895, when he won first prize. He also won major awards at expositions in Barcelona, Munich, and Philadelphia. In 1894, following the death of Rigalt, he was appointed Professor of perspective and landscape at the Escola de Belles Arts de Barcelona. In 1900, together with Lluís Graner and Enric Galwey, he helped create the "Sociedad Artística y Literaria de Cataluña".

In the late 1890s, he returned to his early interest in the theater, working as a scenic director. He also wrote several plays; notably the comedy, Lluny dels Ulls, a Prop del Cor (Far from the Eyes, Near to the Heart), which premiered at the Teatre Principal in 1901. Most of his plays have rural settings. None of them were very successful.

His works consist almost entirely of landscapes and maritime scenes, often set in isolated places such as cemeteries and monasteries, but he created illustrations depicting the Tragic Week of 1909 and the Rif War as well. His son, Ricardo Urgell Carreras, was also a painter.

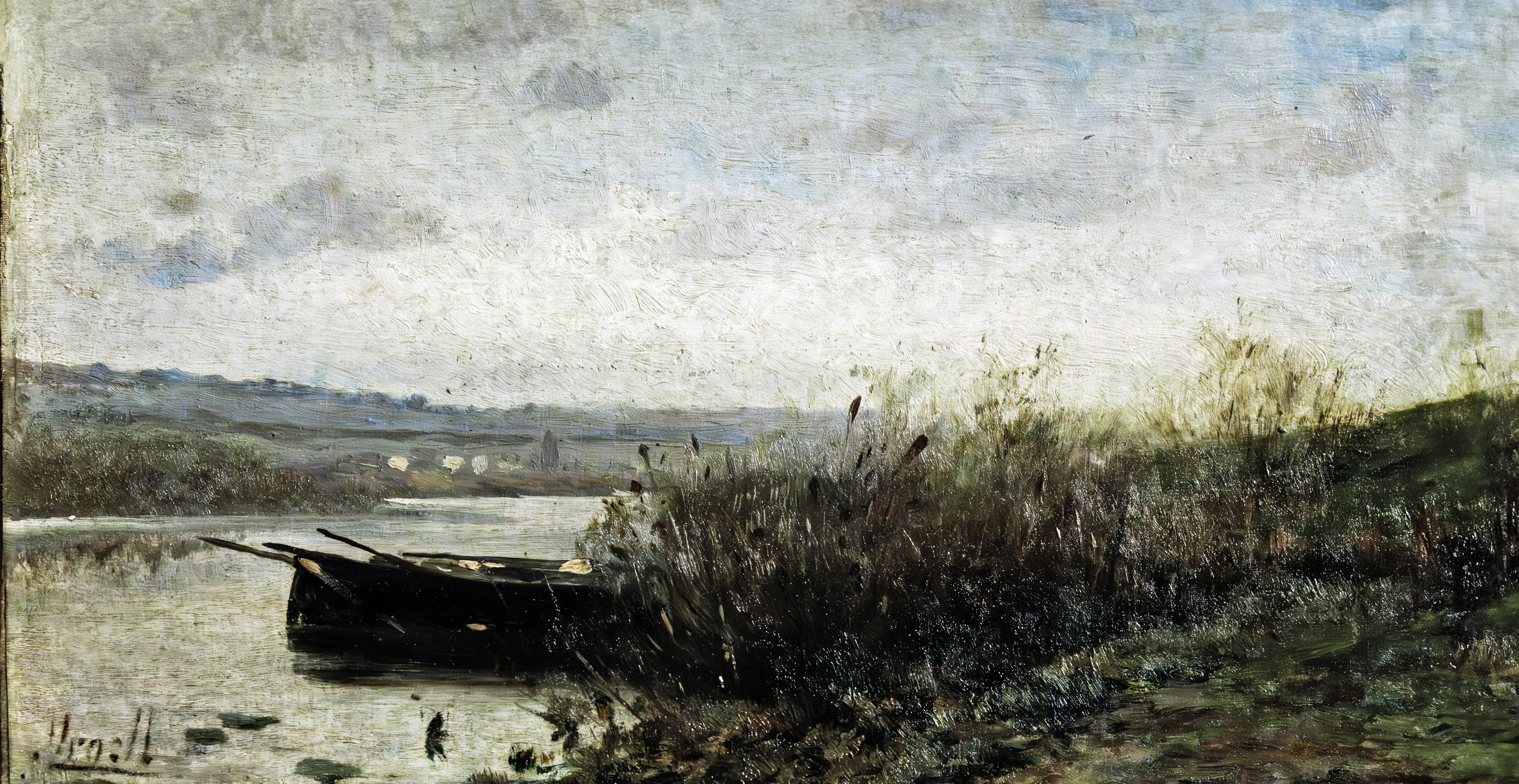
Boat on the Shore of the Lake of Banyoles Museu Nacional d'Art de Catalunya

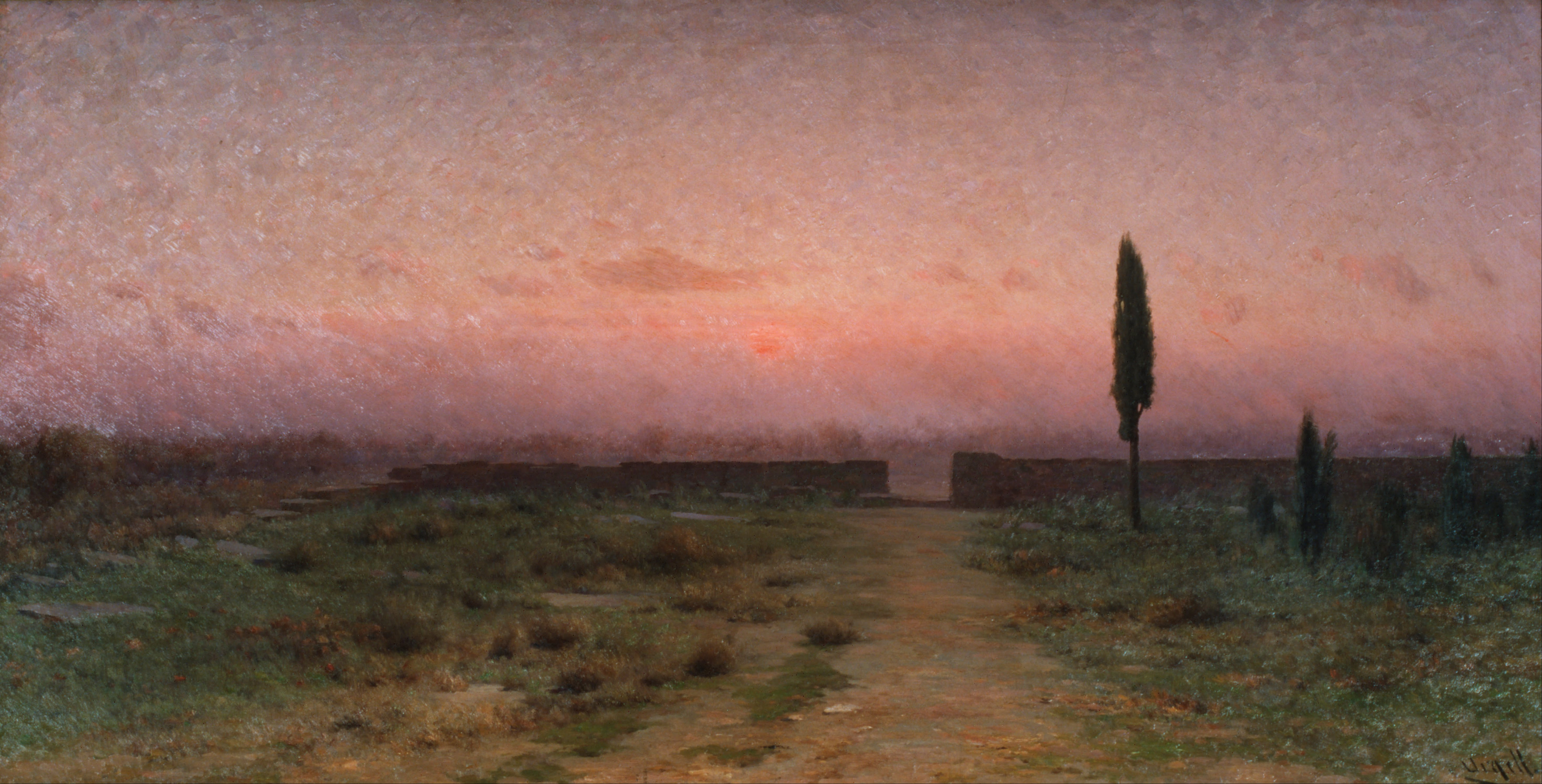
Untitled landscape
