= Enric Galwey =

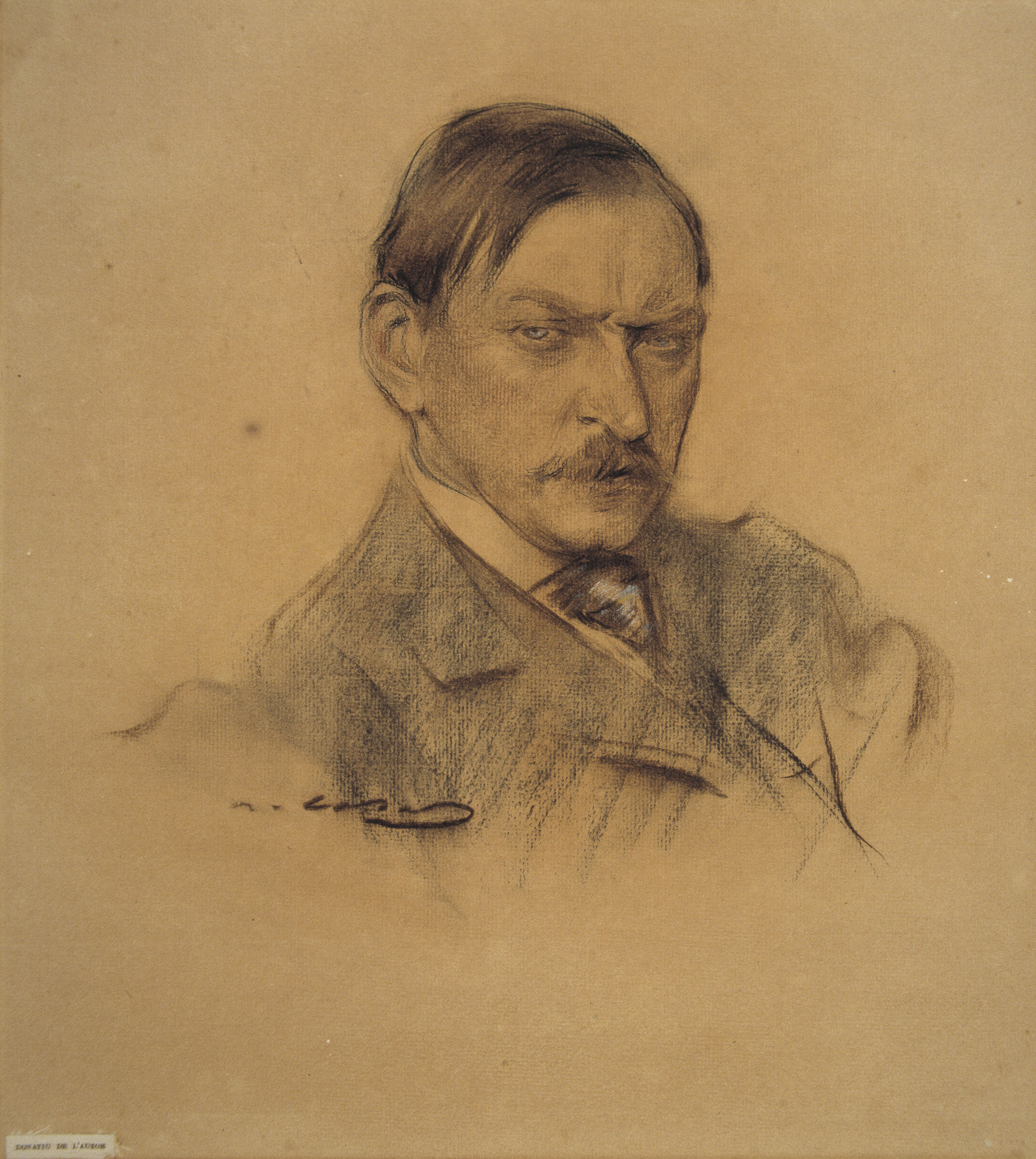
- Enric Galwey; portrait by Ramon Casas
- Born: Enric Galwey i Garcia; 17 April 1864; Barcelona, Catalonia, Spain
- Died: 10 February 1931 (aged 66); Barcelona, Catalonia, Spain
- Known for: Painting
- Movement: Landscape painting

Enric Galwey i Garcia or, in Spanish, Enrique Galwey y García (1864 – 10 February 1931) was a Spanish painter, associated with the Olot school of landscape painting.

== Biography ==
He was born in Barcelona, son of a merchant of Irish descent. He began his studies at the Escola de la Llotja and, in 1885, went to Olot to perfect his technique with the landscape painter, Joaquim Vayreda. His first exhibition of watercolors in Barcelona came that same year.

In 1889, he decided that his paintings were a bit static and went to Paris to study the works of Rousseau, Corot, Millet and other members of the Barbizon school. His stay coincided with the first major Impressionist exhibition, which also had a significant influence on his style.

When he returned in 1890, he held an exhibition at the Sala Parés, which received good critical reviews, and opened a workshop in central Barcelona. He continued to make frequent trips to Olot until Vayreda's death and, for the rest of his life, was a regular visitor to Valldemossa on Mallorca. His first showing at the National Exhibition of Fine Arts came in 1895 and he took second place there in 1897.

Together with Modest Urgell and Lluís Graner, he founded the "Societat Artística i Literària de Catalunya", a society of middle-class artists, writers and art collectors who were opposed to Modernisme. From 1900 to 1926, the society held annual exhibitions at the Sala Parés. He was also an active member of the Cercle Artístic de Sant Lluc. He died in Barcelona.

In 1934, the Sala Parés published his brief memoir: El que he vist a can Parés en els darrers quaranta anys: memòries d'Enric Galwey.

== Selected paintings ==
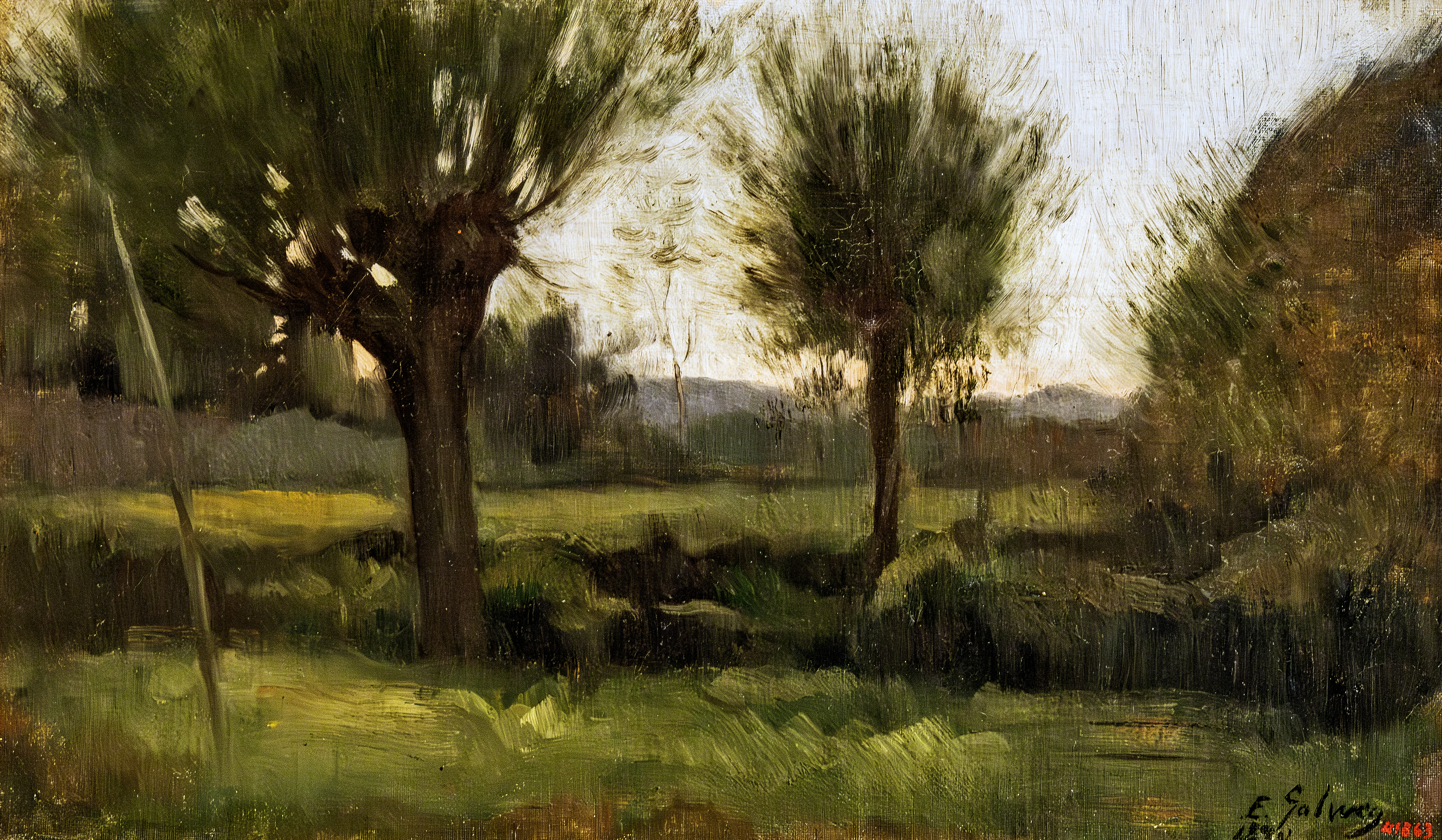
Willows at sunset MNAC (1890)

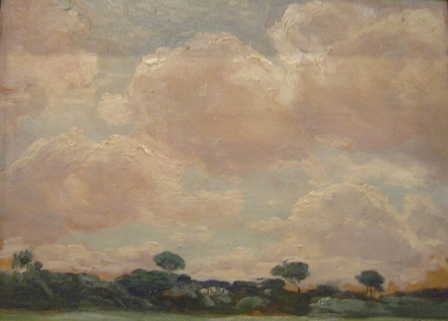
Untitled landscape

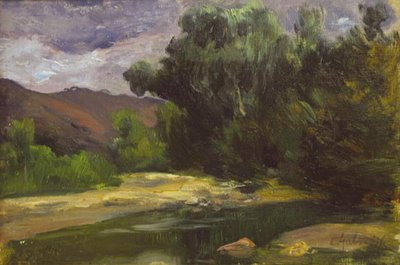
Untitled landscape

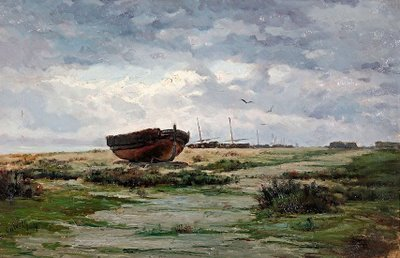
Boats on the Beach

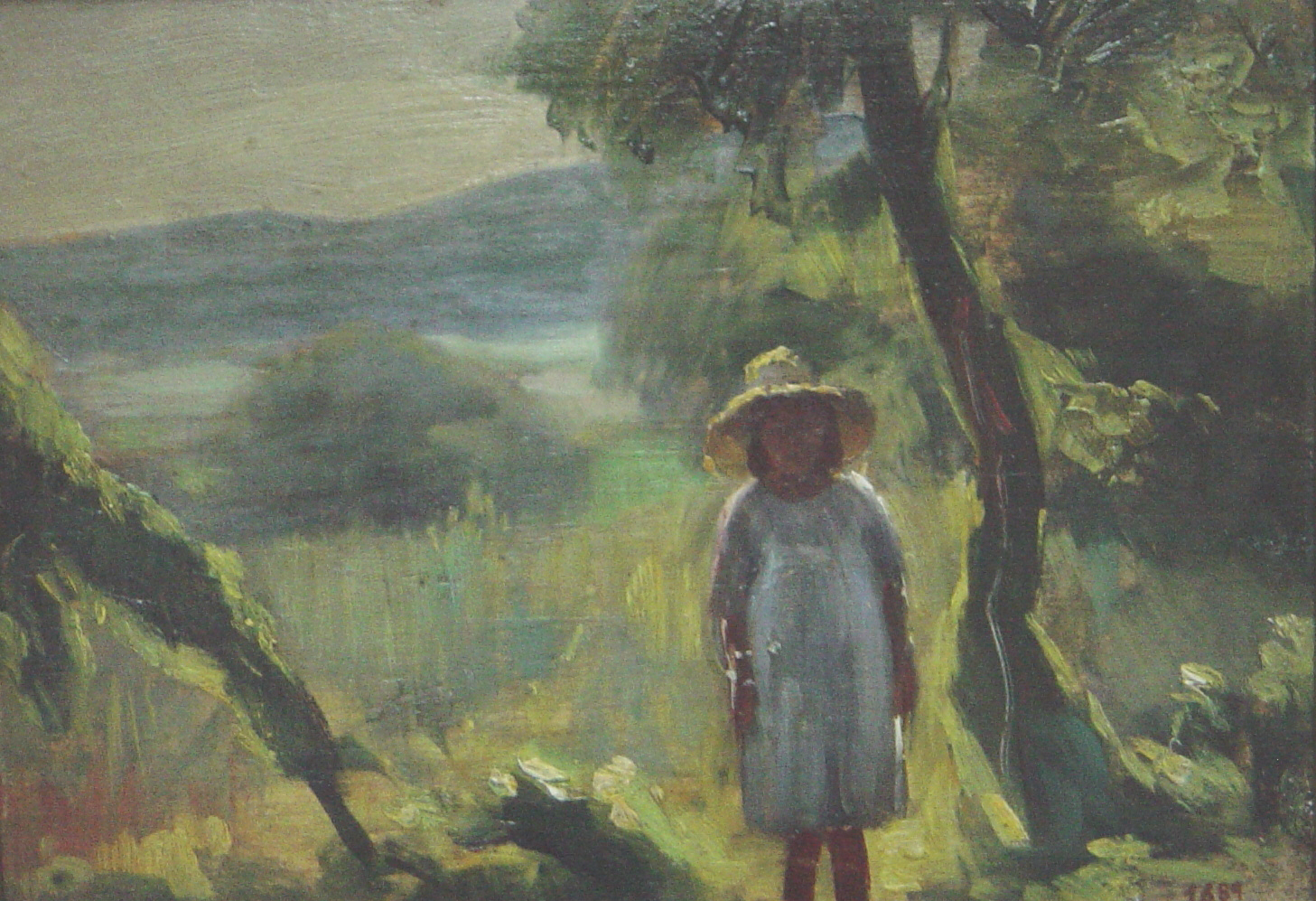
Landscape with Figure
