= Vicenç Cuyàs =

Spanish composer

Vicente Cuyás (Catalan: Vicenç Cuyàs i Borés) (Palma de Mallorca, 6 February 1816 – Barcelona, 7 March 1839) was a Spanish composer known for his romantic opera La fattucchiera.

Vicente Cuyás was born to a Catalan family in Palma de Mallorca where his family had fled during the Peninsular War. Shortly thereafter, the family returned to Barcelona where Cuyás began studies in medicine, which he soon abandoned. At the age of 17 he began to study music with Ramón Vilanova, one of Barcelona's most prestigious teachers during the early nineteenth century, who in turn had trained in Milan with abbé Isidore Piantanida.

Cuyás' early works consist of some operatic music which was premiered widely in private salons, but it was at the Teatre de la Santa Creu where almost all of his works were produced. His First Symphony, written in 1835, although it is actually an extensive opera overture in a single movement — but it gained him some notice when it was dedicated to the actress Matilde Díez. Of his Second Symphony only a fragment remains. By 1835 several arias and duets had been composed for a drama of Antonio Ribot.

As far as opera is concerned, Vincenzo Bellini was his prime influence.

== Work in opera: La fattuchiera ==
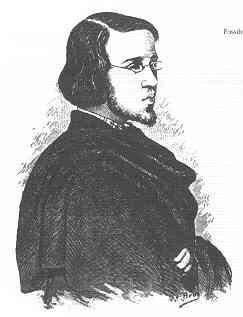
Vicenç Cuyàs

Cuyás is known almost exclusively for La fattucchiera (The Sorceress or The Fortune-Teller), regarded as "perhaps the biggest event in Spanish nineteenth century opera", although it is sung in Italian. In order to finish La fattuchiera "in record time", he abandoned writing an opera, Ugo conte di Parigi, for which a libretto had been prepared by the well-known Italian librettist, Felice Romani. Another Romani libretto—for El sonámbulo—was never completed.

Premiered on 17 June 1838 in Barcelona, La fattuchiera, it was a "resounding success" and had 20 performances in the first season, then seven in the 1839 season. Cuyàs would probably have become an important composer of operas but had died at 22 of tuberculosis at the time of the final scene of the last performance of the opera in March 1839. Cuyàs father had also died of tuberculosis during the rehearsals.

The opera is based on a novel by the Viscount of Arlincourt which had already been a success among the sentimental literature of the period. The action takes place in the twelfth century, after the Third Crusade, and in the plot, historical references are combined "into a story filled with magic, witchcraft, diabolic powers, and the redemptive power of romantic love." Felice Romani had written a libretto based on the same plot for Saverio Mercadante's opera Ismalia ossia Morte ed amore which was given on 27 October 1832 at La Scala).

Ramón Carnicer reused the same libretto for an opera premiered in Madrid.

== Recordings ==
- La fattuchiera, Ofèlia Sala (Ismalia), Simon Orfila (Ulrico), José Sempere (Oscar), under Josep Pons with the Orquestra Simfònica del Gran Teatre del Liceu. Columna Musica: Cat #: 1CM0101.
