= Fidel Roig Matons =

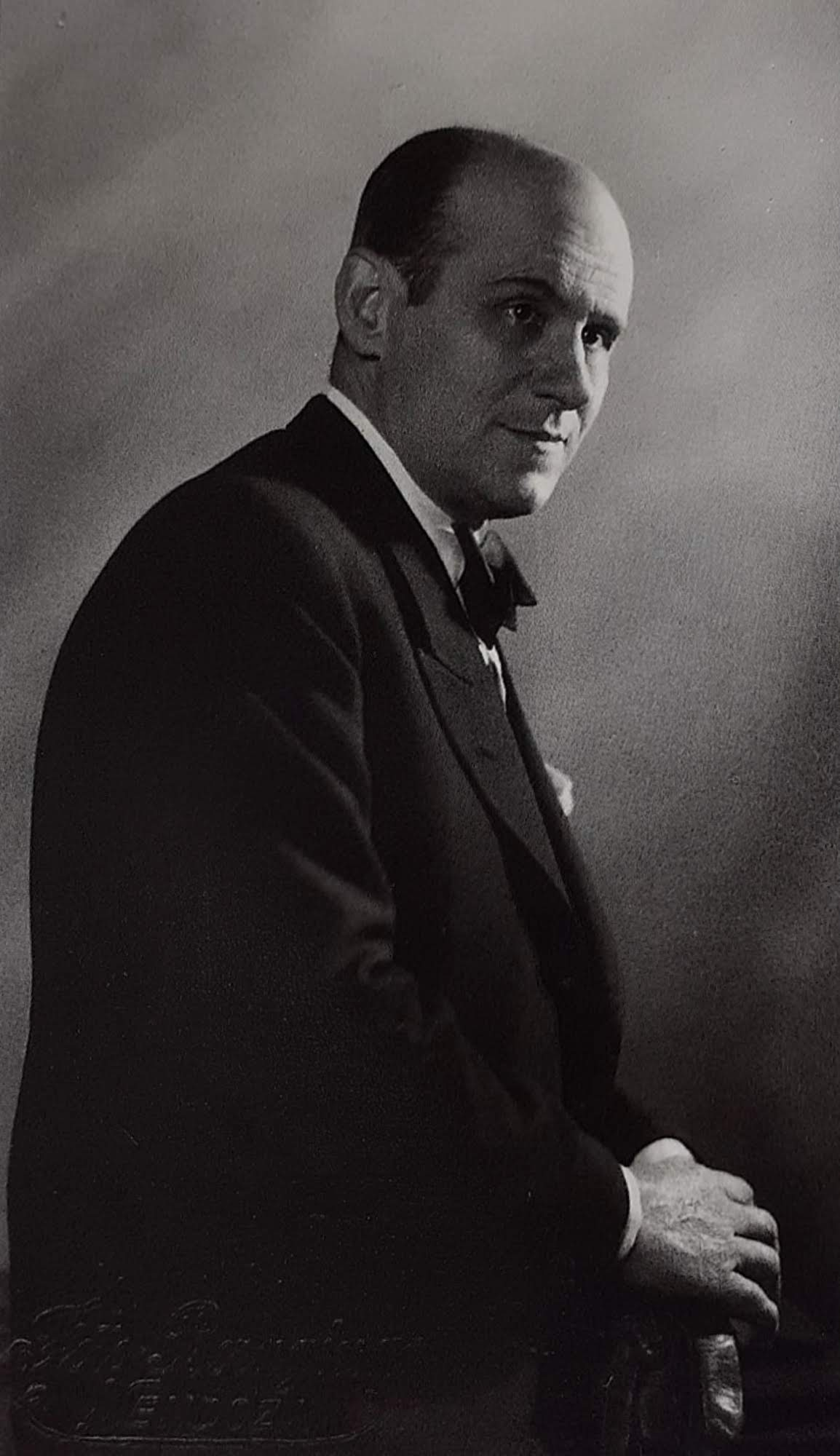
Fidel Roig Matons

Fidel Roig Matons (born Fidel Enric Jaume Roig i Matons, Girona, Catalonia, May 27, 1887 - Mendoza, Argentina, Argentina, May 26, 1977) was a Catalan painter and musician. He did his first studies at the Academia de Belles Arts de Barcelona (nowadays Real Academia Catalana de Bellas Artes "de Sant Jordi") under the direction of Lluís Perich and Lluís Graner. In 1907 he moved to Argentina, staying for a short period of time in Buenos Aires and settling finally in 1908 in Mendoza. By the late '30s, he was active as a chamber music interpreter and teacher of fine arts at the Don Bosco College (from 1911 to 1925) and the Agustin Alvarez National College (from 1926 to 1931). From 1925 onwards he gradually abandoned his musical activity and turned on to painting. His work initially focused in depictions of the people and customs of the Huarpes indigenous population. After 1936, he fully devoted his work to Andes Andes mountains landscapes, aiming to produce a whole pictoric sequence of the Crossing of the Andes, the military campaign of General Jose de San Martin to expel the Spanish royalists from Chile in 1818. He was co-founder of the Orchestral Society of Mendoza in 1922, and of the Academia Provincial de Bellas Artes of Mendoza in 1925. His prolific work had to be abandoned from 1952 due to his gradual loss of sight.
