= Jacinto Grau =

Spanish playwright

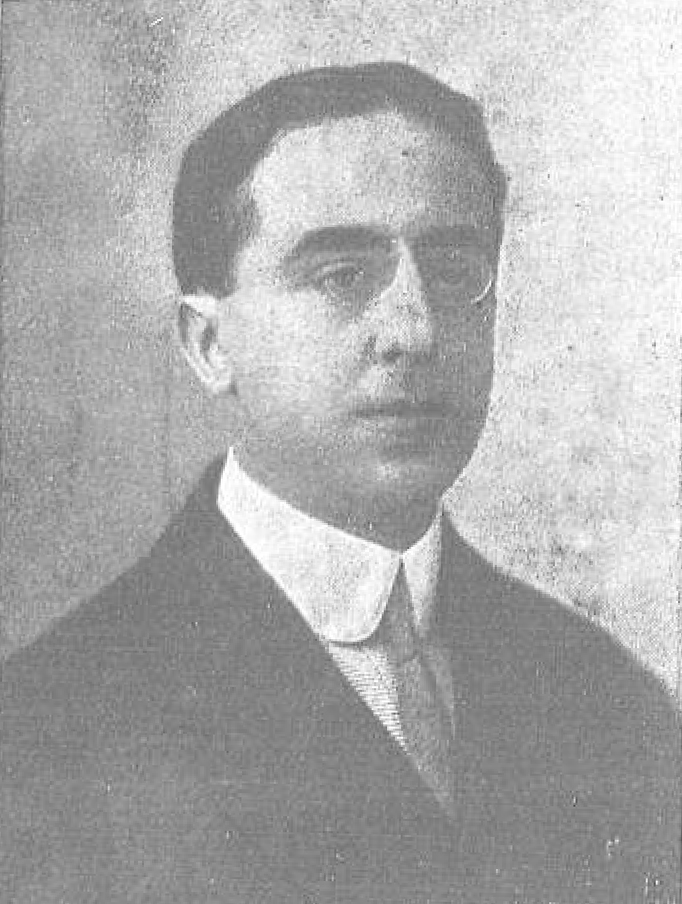
- Born: 1877; Barcelona, Spain
- Died: 14 August 1958 (aged 80–81); Buenos Aires, Argentina

Jacinto Grau Delgado (1877 – 14 August 1958) was a Spanish writer. Best known for his plays, and his theoretical approach to theater, he also wrote essays, short stories, and criticism.

== Life ==
Grau was born in Barcelona. He served as the Envoy Extraordinary and Minister Plenipotentiary of Loyalist Spain to Panama during the Spanish Civil War. Following the war he emigrated to Argentina, where he died in exile in 1958.

== Career ==
Grau published twenty-five plays over the course of fifty-five years. His most celebrated work is El señor de Pigmalión (1921), which remained relatively unknown in Spain during his lifetime, though it was successful in Europe and Latin America. Grau has stated that he writes plays 'with the greatest intensity possible within the limits of classical harmony'.^{:23-24}

His work is 'anti-realistic', and heavily influenced by George Bernard Shaw, as well as Henrik Ibsen, Jean Anouihl and Buero Vallejo.^{:269-70} His contemporary critics 'universally' identified his theatre as avant-garde, though Grau 'scorned avant-garde theatre'. Modern scholars have identified him as a 'psychological idealist'.^{:23}

He was nominated for a Nobel Prize in Literature in 1949.

== Plays ==
Play	Year Published	Year Premiered	Location Premiered
El Conde Alarcos	1917		
El hijo pródigo	1918	1918	
El Mismo daño	1921		
El señor de Pigmalión	1921	1923	Charles Dullin's L'Atelier (Paris)^{:135}
La Casa del Diablo	1933		
En Ildaria			
Entre Llamas			
El Caballero Varona			
