= Adrià Gual =

Catalan playwright and theatre businessman

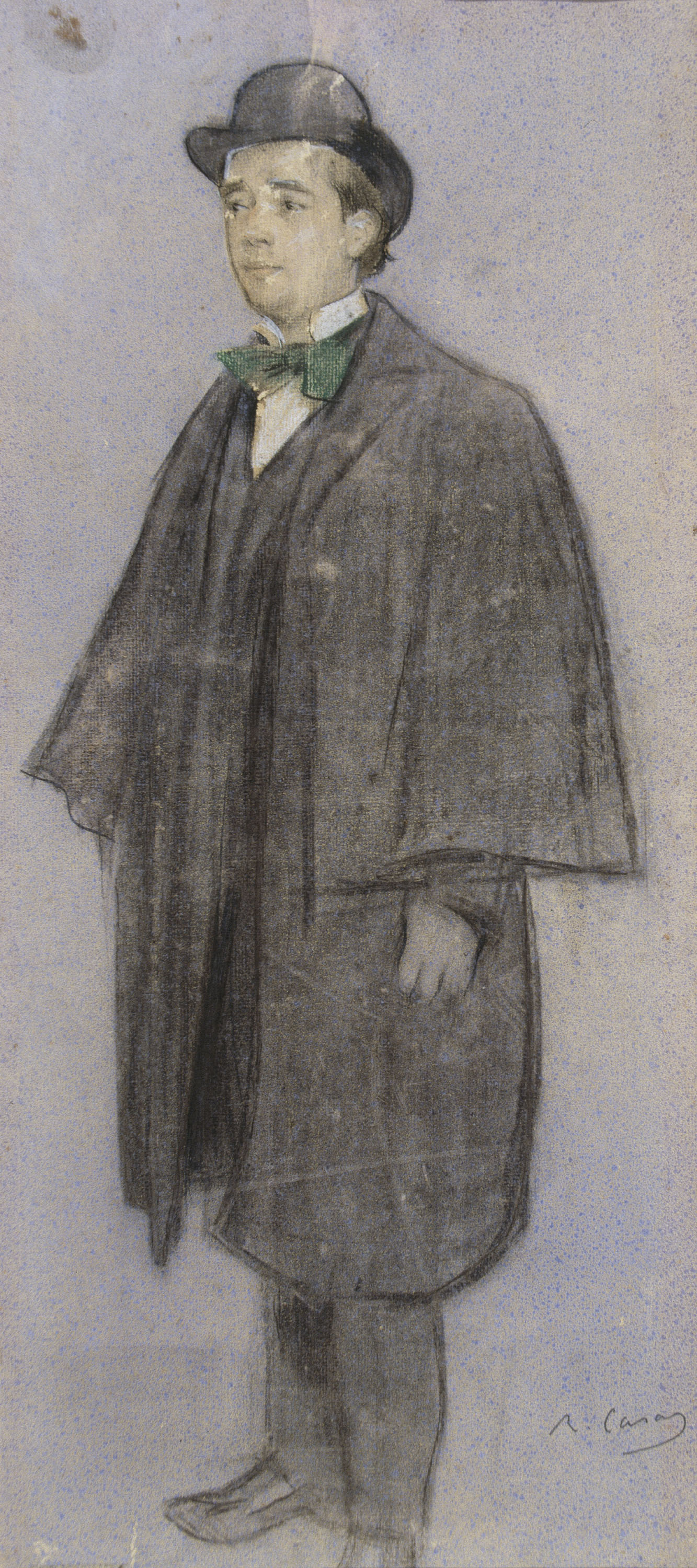
Adrià Gual seen by Ramon Casas (MNAC).

Adrià Gual i Queralt (Catalan pronunciation: [əðɾiˈa ˈɣwal i kəˈral]; 1872 in Barcelona – 1943) was a Catalan playwright and theatre businessman, founder of the Escola Catalana d'Art Dramàtic and a pioneer of cinema in Barcelona.

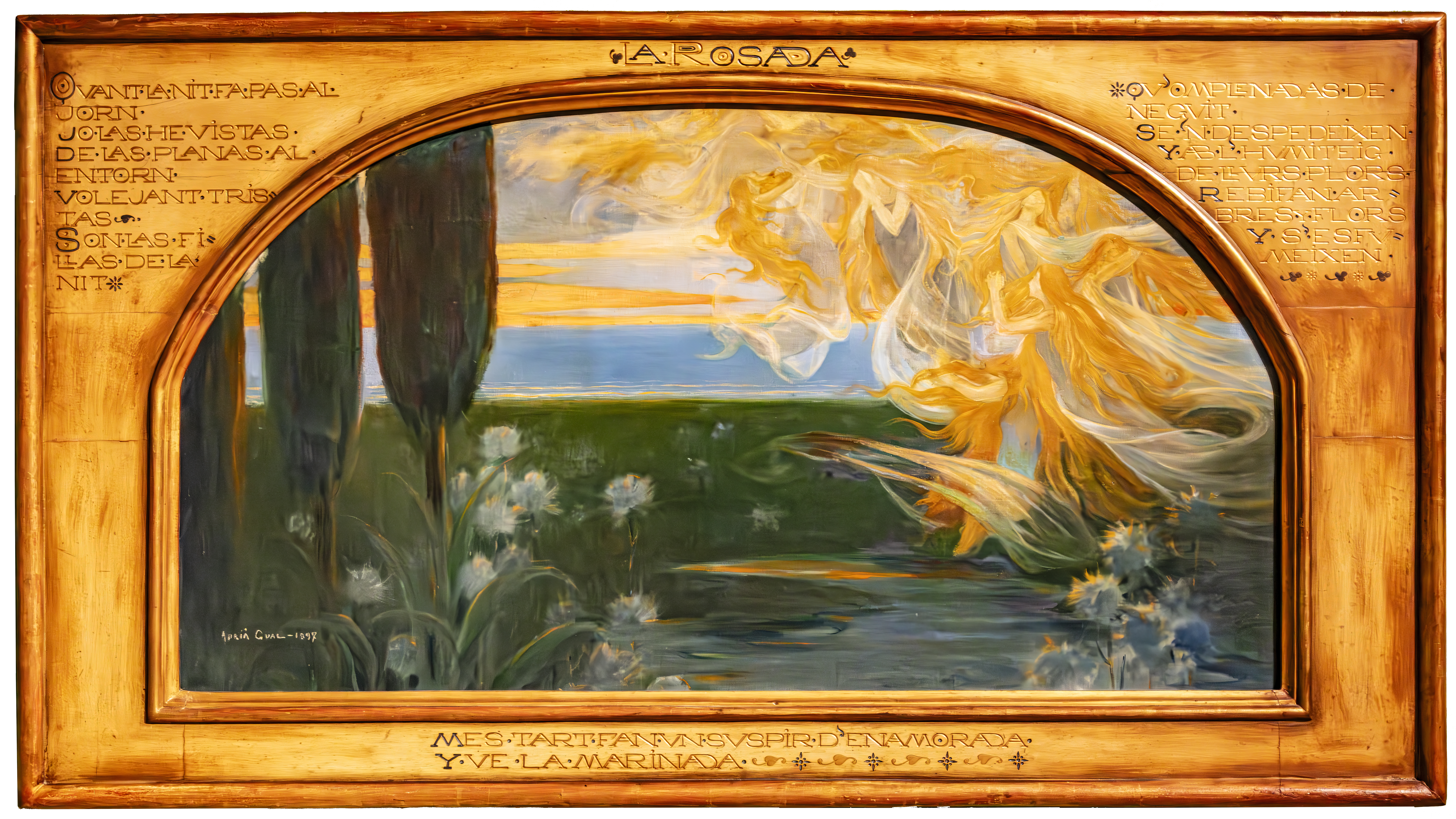
The Dew, painting by Adrià Gual from 1897. 725×1305 mm. Museu Nacional d'Art de Catalunya

He founded El Teatre Íntim (The Intimate Theatre). He was Director of the Catalan School of Drama and artistic director of the film production Barcinógrafo (1913). Document important were his memoirs, published posthumously: Mitja vida de teatre (Half Life Theatre, 1960). As a plastic artist, focused on a modernist style typical symbolist ("La rosada" The dew, MNAC). He was one of the leading graphic artists of Modernism, emphasizing their posters. Finally devoted their efforts to the set of works assembled by him. It is well represented in the Library of Catalonia, where even the twelve panels are preserved in oil painted for the Wagnerian Association, around 1902.

He also dignify the Catalan drama, which he stood at the same level as in other modern nations. For this purpose he built a Catalan repertoire full of classics, contemporary and native size plays like Aeschylus, Molière, Shakespeare, Goethe, Pérez Galdós, Maragall, Àngel Guimerà o Santiago Rusiñol. At the same time, the creation of l'Escola Catalana d'Art Dramàtic (School of Dramatic Art, 1913–1934), the current seed of l'Institut del Teatre (Theatre Institute), helped institutionalize the Catalan theater. It was the first organization dedicated to teaching the performing arts.

Aiming to renew the drama from head to toe Catalan sign nineteenth century, alternated eclectic references, from Henrik Ibsen and Maurice Maeterlinck to Richard Wagner, to Gabriele d'Annunzio and Gerhart Hauptmann and aesthetic heterogeneous.

Gual grew as a playwright at the height modernist and symbolist poetry was soaking his early works. Nocturn. Andante. Morat (1896) and Silenci (1898), with decadent atmosphere and a very suggestive correspondence between music and colors and words.

The successful Misteri de dolor(1904) inaugurated a new period. First, Gual opted for a dramatic style of drawing more realistic, melodramatic and social, which is quite visible in Els pobres menestrals (1908). On the other hand, with Blancaflor (1899) opts for a combination of myth and song. He also made a foray into comedy with Les alegres comediantes (1905). Still, he ventured into the poetic theater, characterized by verse, scenic wonder and atmosphere with legendary Donzell qui cerca muller (1910).

== Theater ==
- Oh, Estrella! (1891)
- La mosca vironera (1891)
- La visita (1893)
- L'últim hivern (1893)
- La mar brama (1894)
- Morts en vida (1894)
- El perill (1895)
- Nocturn (Audante Morat) (1895)
- Blancaflor(1897)
- Silenci (Drama de món) (1898)
- L'emigrant (1900)
- Camí d'Orient (1901)
- Misteri de dolor (1901)
- Les alegres comediantes (1902)
- La fi de Tomàs Reynald (1904)
- Els pobres menestrals (1906)
- Marcolf (1907)
- La pobra Berta (1907)
- Donzell qui cerca muller (1910)
- En Jordi Flama (1911)
- L'Arlequí vividor (1912)
- La comèdia extraordinària de l'home que va perdre el temps (1913)
- La gran família (1915)
- Els avars (1916)
- Shumann al vell casal (1916)
- Els pastors en revolta (1916)
- Les filoses (1916)
- La serenata (1916)
- Joan Ezequiel (1916)
- Hores d'amor i de tristesa (1916)
- Fígaro o la dama que s'avorria (1917)
- La mentidera (1927)
- El camí (1939)

== Bibliography ==
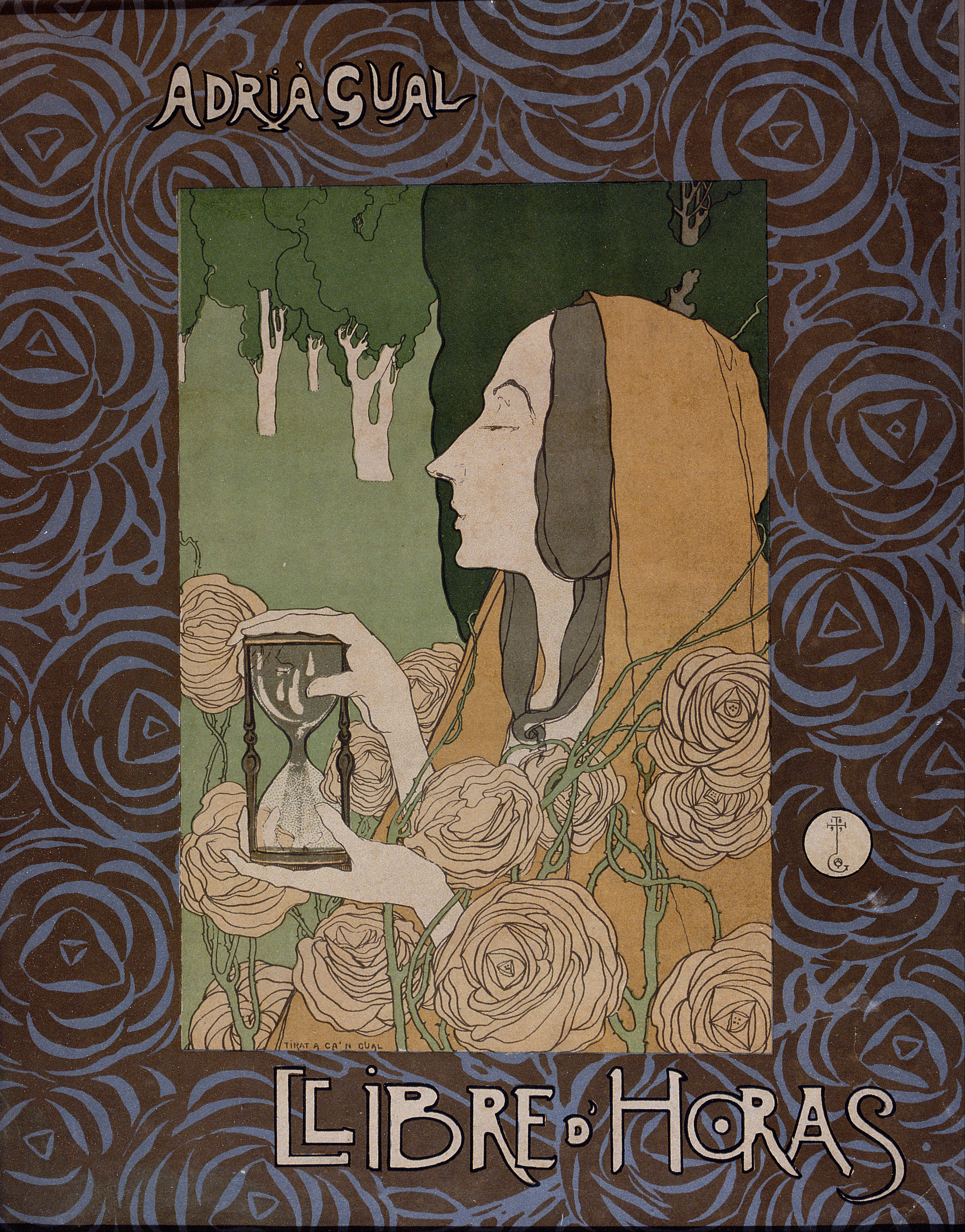
Llibre d'Horas, poster by Adrià Gual from 1899. 545 × 426 mm. Museu Nacional d'Art de Catalunya

- Adrià Gual, Mitja vida de teatre: memòries d'Adrià Gual, Aedos, 1960.
- Adrià Gual, Misteri de dolor, dins Teatre modernista, antologia a cura de Xavier Fàbregas, Edicions 62 i La Caixa, MOLC 77.
- Adrià Gual, Mitja vida de modernisme, Institut del Teatre, 1992.
- Carles Batlle i Jordà, El teatre d'Adrià Gual: 1891-1902, Universitat Autònoma de Barcelona, 1998.
- Carles Batlle i Jordà, Adria Gual (1891–1902): per un teatre simbolista, Abadia de Montserrat, 2001.
- Hermann Bonnin Llinàs, Adrià Gual i l'Escola Catalana d'Art Dramàtic (1913–1923), Dalmau, 1974.
- Enric Ciurans, Adrià Gual, Infiesta, col·lecció Gent nostra, 2000.
- Miquel Porter Moix, Adrià Gual i el cinema primitiu català, Universitat de Barcelona, 1985.
- Ricard Salvat, Adrià Gual i la seva època, Edicions 62, 1972.
