= Teatre Principal (Barcelona) =

Theatre in Barcelona, Spain

Coordinates: 41°22′43″N 2°10′31″E

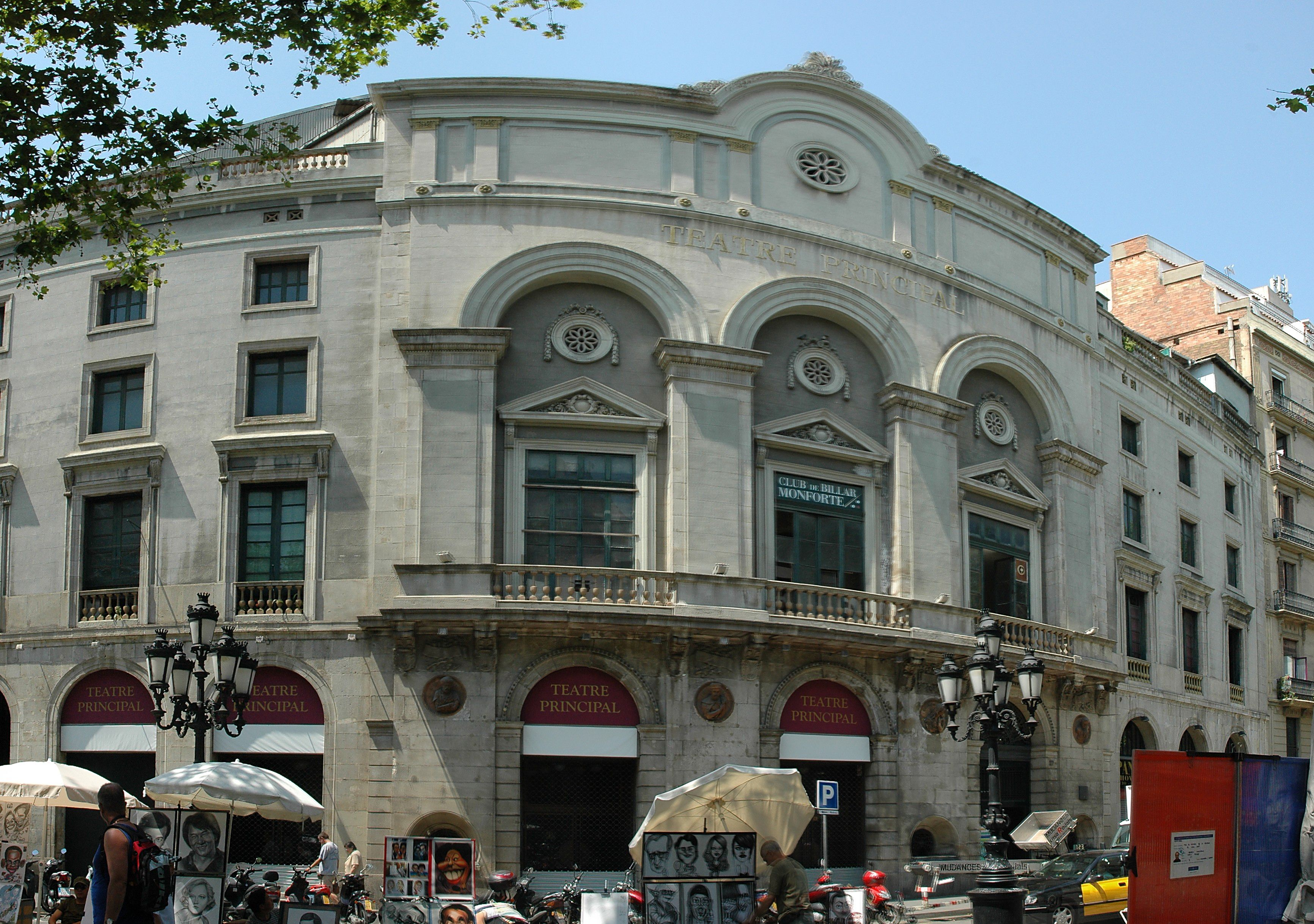
Teatre Principal, on the Rambla

The Teatre Principal (in Catalan, or in Spanish Teatro Principal) is the oldest theatre in Barcelona, founded in 1579, built between 1597 and 1603 and rebuilt several times, mainly in 1788 and again in 1848. The theatre was originally named the Teatro de la Santa Cruz in Spanish (or Teatre de la Santa Creu in Catalan). It is located on the famous avenue of La Rambla.

The theatre was founded by a donation of land and houses on the Rambla de Barcelona, made by Joan Bosch in favour of the Hospital of the Holy Cross, then the most important hospital in the city, to build a theatre in it. With the benefits of the plays and shows, the hospital could bear part of its expenses. For these benefits to be greater, the theatre would have the exclusive right to host theatrical performances in the city. On 27 October 1787 the theatre underwent a fire that completely destroyed it. Rebuilt thanks to the donations of nobles like the Marquess of Ciutadella and the Count of El Asalto, the new theatre, more sumptuous, was inaugurated on 4 November 1788. After three more fires and the opening of the Liceu opera house in 1847 the Teatro Principal fell into decadence. A popular campaign prevented it from demolition in 1889. In January 2006 it closed its doors as working theatre.

It was the scene of the Spanish premieres on many plays and operas (since 1750 there was a stable opera season), and for the world premieres of Spanish works including operas by Ferran Sor, Vicenç Cuyàs or Ramon Carnicer.
