= Lluís Graner =

Catalan painter (1863–1929)

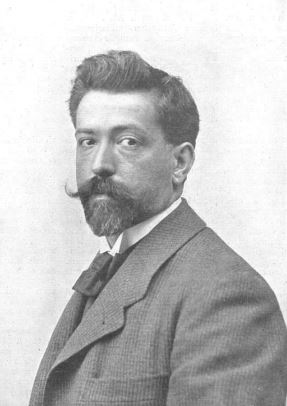
Portrait of Lluís Graner.

Lluís Graner i Arrufí, or Arrufat in Spanish (5 February 1863–7 May 1929) was a Catalan painter in the Realistic style, artistic director and theater entrepreneur from Barcelona, Spain. After achieving notable success in painting, he moved into lighting design for theatrical shows and developed the Catalan lyrical theater genre of "musical visions".

He was the owner of the sala Mercè, on Barcelona's Rambla, where he established the first stable season of cinematograph sessions and musical visions. In 1905 he won the competition for the lease of Barcelona's Teatro Principal, where he set up the company Espectacles-Audicions Graner. Under his artistic direction, notable pieces of Catalan lyric theater were premiered, such as La santa espina, by Enric Morera and Àngel Guimerà.

== Biography ==
He was born in Barcelona, and studied at the Escola de la Llotja from 1883, with Antoni Caba (color/composition) and Benet Mercadé (drawing).

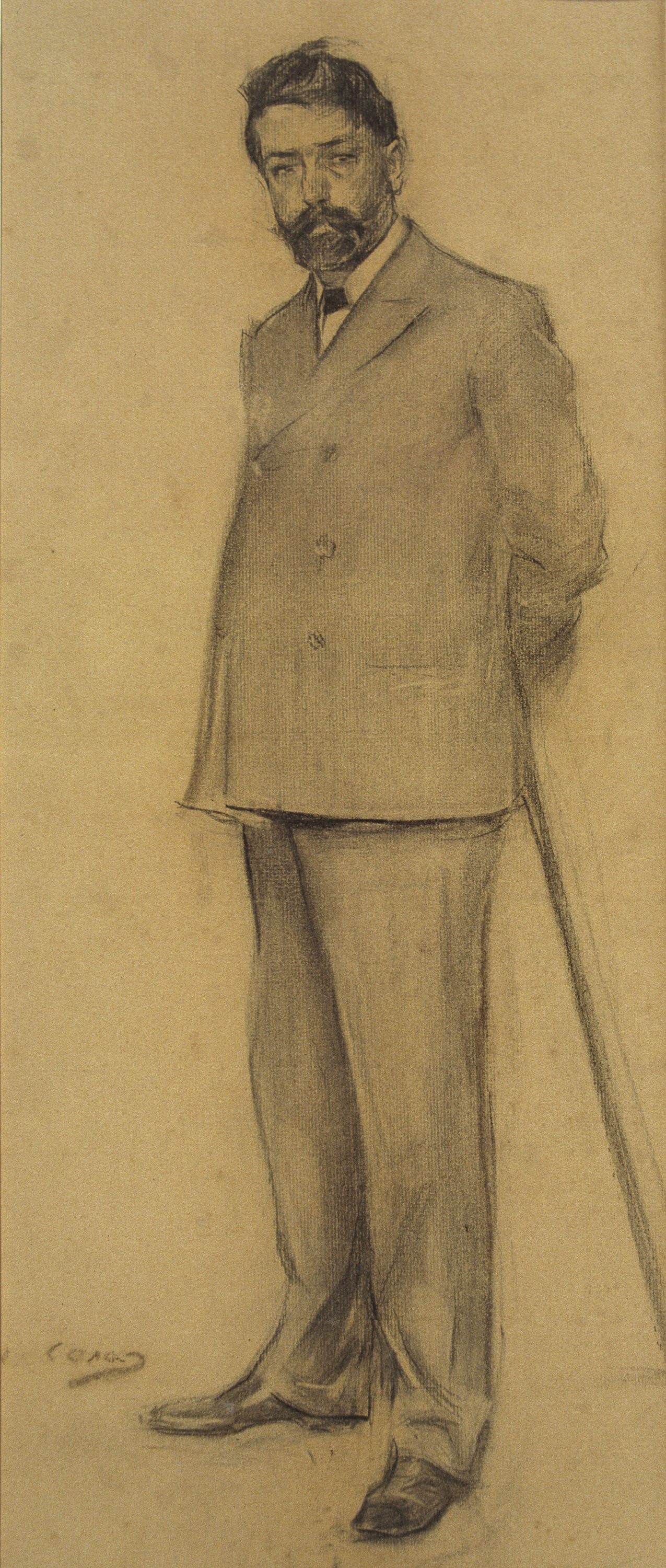
Lluís Graner, by Ramon Casas.

During his final year at school, he received a grant to study in Madrid, where he copied and learned from the Old Masters at the Museo del Prado. After that, supported by a fellowship, he moved to Paris and became a member of the Academie des Beaux-Arts. Later, he returned to Barcelona, but continued to travel to cities throughout Europe, including Berlin, Munich and Düsseldorf.

Driven by the idea of offering a total art show where all the arts were involved, he founded in 1904 the sala Mercè on Barcelona's Rambla, whose design was commissioned to Antoni Gaudí, being the only scenic space designed by the modernist architect. The hall offered cinema sessions combined with the representation of musical visions. Caves were created in the basement, where visual attractions such as dioaramas, life-size statues or monumental nativity scenes were installed.

Due to the success of the sala Mercè during its first season, Graner embarked on the adventure of renting the Teatro Principal in Barcelona in 1905, where he set up his company Espectacles-Audicions Graner, which, despite the great success of his shows, set up a loss-making production model due to the painter's lack of business experience and forced him to survive economically by making portraits on commission.

In his later years, he left Spain, living successively in Havana, New York and several other places while travelling to Santiago, Buenos Aires and Rio de Janeiro. During these years, he lived almost entirely on money sent to him by his friends. He returned to Barcelona in 1928, the year before his death, and held a major show at the Hotel Ritz. He died in Barcelona.

== Relationship with Gaudí ==
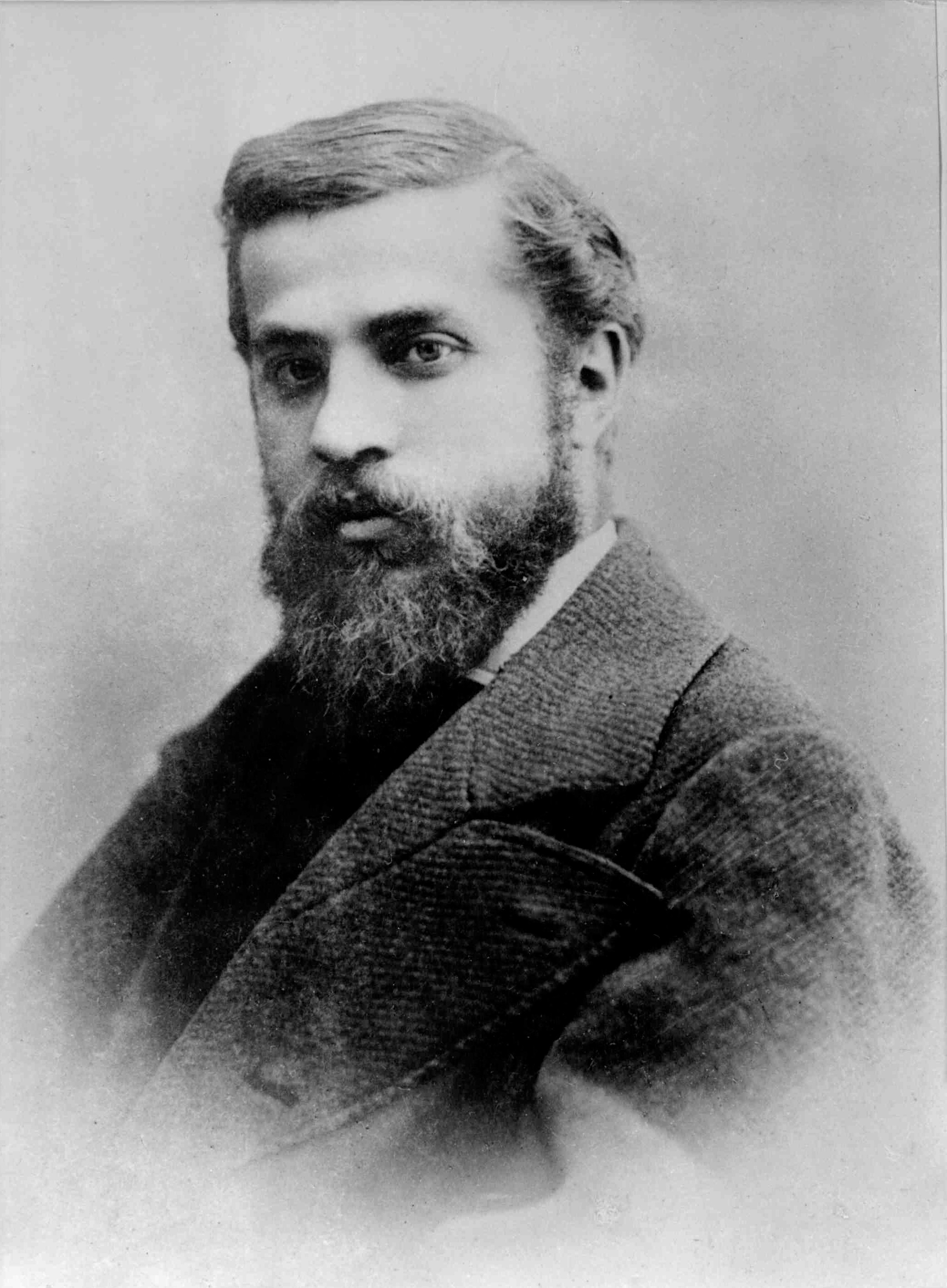
Picture of Antoni Gaudí.

In 1904, Graner commissioned the architect Antoni Gaudí to design a single-family house in Bonanova, a neighborhood in the upper part of Barcelona. For the so-called Graner villa, the architect designed a project halfway between the Batlló house and the porter's lodge in Park Güell. Two sketches of the plan and elevation of the building are preserved from the project, published by Josep Francesc Ràfols in his 1929 biography of the architect. The house was not finished due to the financial ruin of the owner due to his theatrical business. Only the foundations of the building and the garden gate were built, made of masonry and with three openings, one for pedestrians, one for carriages and a circular hole above the pedestrian door that Gaudí called "door of the birds". This door remained standing for several years —a 1927 photo taken by Marino Canosa is preserved— until it was demolished.

That same year, he commissioned Gaudí to design the decoration of the sala Mercè, on the Rambla dels Estudis, one of the first cinemas in Barcelona. The room imitated a grotto, inspired by the Drach caves of Mallorca. Together with Gaudí, the set designers Salvador Alarma, Fèlix Urgellès and Maurici Vilomara were involved. The hall closed in 1910 due to the bankruptcy of the owner and his exile to America in order not to pay the outstanding debts.

== Lluís Graner as a theater entrepreneur ==
=== The musical visions ===
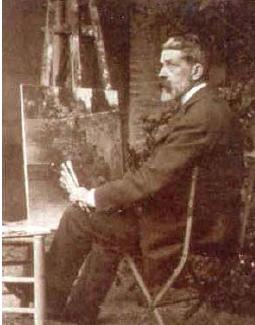
Lluís Graner painting in his studio.

Influenced by the theories of total art, he decided to abandon painting in 1904 in order to offer shows that would represent a synthesis of all of the arts. He began, at the age of 40, to learn how to play the piano and read music. His interest in chiaroscuro in painting was then transferred to experimentation with electric lighting on the theatrical stage. As artistic director of his theatrical shows, he experimented with the mixture of colors and intensities of stage lighting and with the recreation of natural phenomena on stage, a clear example of which is the case of La matinada, a work commissioned to Felip Pedrell, which recreates the sunrise on stage through the gradual increase of the lighting.

With Adrià Gual as stage director of his theatrical companies, he revived the theory of the "popular song harmonized for the stage" that the playwright Gual had essayed in 1897 with Blancaflor and adapted it to present his own proposal of the "musical visions". This genre of Catalan lyric theater aimed to stage pieces from Catalan folklore (songs, legends and tales) as performances of short duration, symbolist aesthetics and great impact and visual suggestion. These "musical visions" were the main stage repertoire of the sala Mercè and their success made Lluís Graner rent the Teatro Principal of Barcelona when it was put out to auction in 1905 in order to accommodate more spectators for his shows.

=== The sala Mercè ===
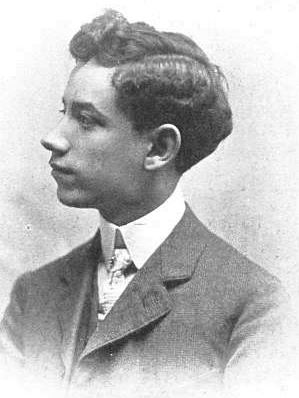
Photograph of Joan B. Lambert, first pianist of the Sala Mercè.

The sala Mercè, the first theatrical space directed by Graner (as manager, owner and artistic director), was inaugurated in 1904. It was located on what is now the Rambla, near Plaça Catalunya, and Gaudí was commissioned to design the space and its decorations. It was a performance hall that aimed to combine various artistic languages, from the cinematograph to the dioramas and visual attractions located in the caves of the Mercè hall. Since its opening, the project counted on the collaboration of important figures related to the Catalan culture of the time: Antoni Gaudí, Adrià Gual, Salvador Alarma, Enric Morera, Josep Carner, Joan B. Lambert and many others were linked, at various times in its existence and to varying degrees of intensity. The project operated between 1904 and 1910, when Graner announced the transfer of the business.

=== The Espectacles-Audicions Graner ===
The main theatrical company of Lluís Graner was the one installed in the Teatro Principal of Barcelona under the name of "Espectacles-Audicions Graner". Initiated in 1905, the first season was based mainly on musical visions, the genre that the businessman had conceived the year before for the sala Mercè. It defined the company's identity brand and differentiated it from other theatrical projects and events, such as that of the Romea theater. During the years of activity of the Espectacles-Audicions Graner, the Principal and the Romea theatres competed as the two "Catalan theaters" of the city.

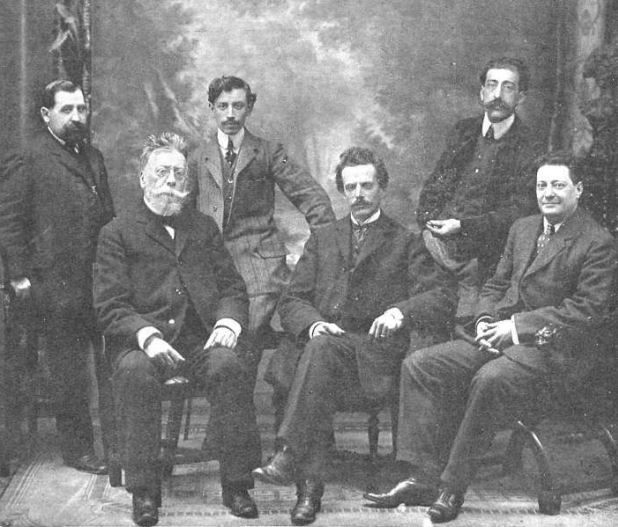
The creative team of La reina vella, premiered at the Espectacles-Audicions Graner, including authors Àngel Guimerà and Enric Morera, musical director Joan B. Lambert and stage director Enric Giménez.

The following seasons of the "espectacles-audicions", in addition to musical visions, also included other genres of lyric theater, such as lyric dramas, translations of French musical comedies and even some opera. Therefore, it concentrated all the proposals of Catalanism related to Catalan lyric theater during its years of activity. Moreover, it offered subscriptions to extraordinary sessions of non-musical theater and concerts, and each theater session combined the stage performance with screenings of short films.

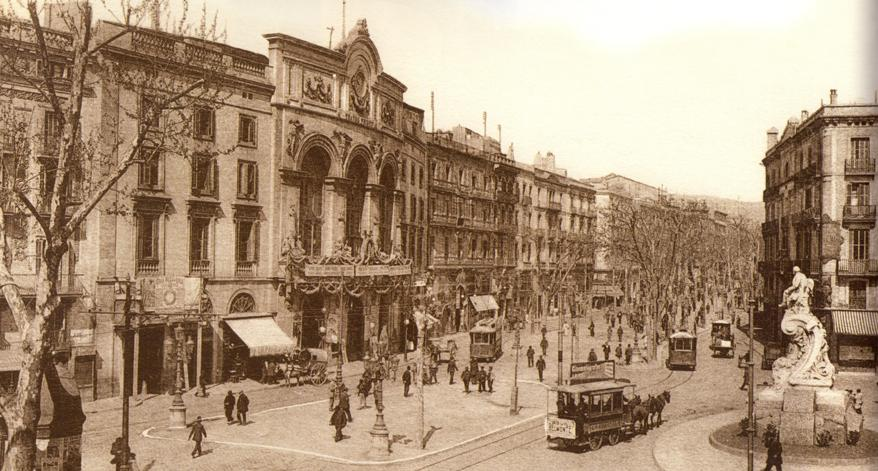
The Teatro Principal of Barcelona during the time of the Espectacles-Audicions Graner (1905–1908).

After three seasons and great successes such as El comte l'Arnau, La presó de Lleida, La santa espina or La reina vella, Lluís Graner left the artistic direction of the company to go to America and work again as a painter. Graner had declared bankruptcy due to his business at the Principal theater, which offered shows of a loss-making nature due to the painter's high investment to offer quality shows at low prices. This forced him to survive economically by making portraits on commission.

== Awards and recognitions ==
- 1888 - Third medal at the Universal Exposition of Barcelona.
- 1889 - Third medal at the Universal Exposition of Paris.
- 1894 - Extraordinary prize of the Queen Regent at the General Exhibition of Fine Arts in Barcelona.
- 1895 and 1901 - Medals at the National Exhibitions.
- 1907 - Gold medal from the Barcelona City Council to the sala Mercè and the Espectacles-Audicions Graner as the best cinematographs and theaters in the city.

== Selected paintings ==
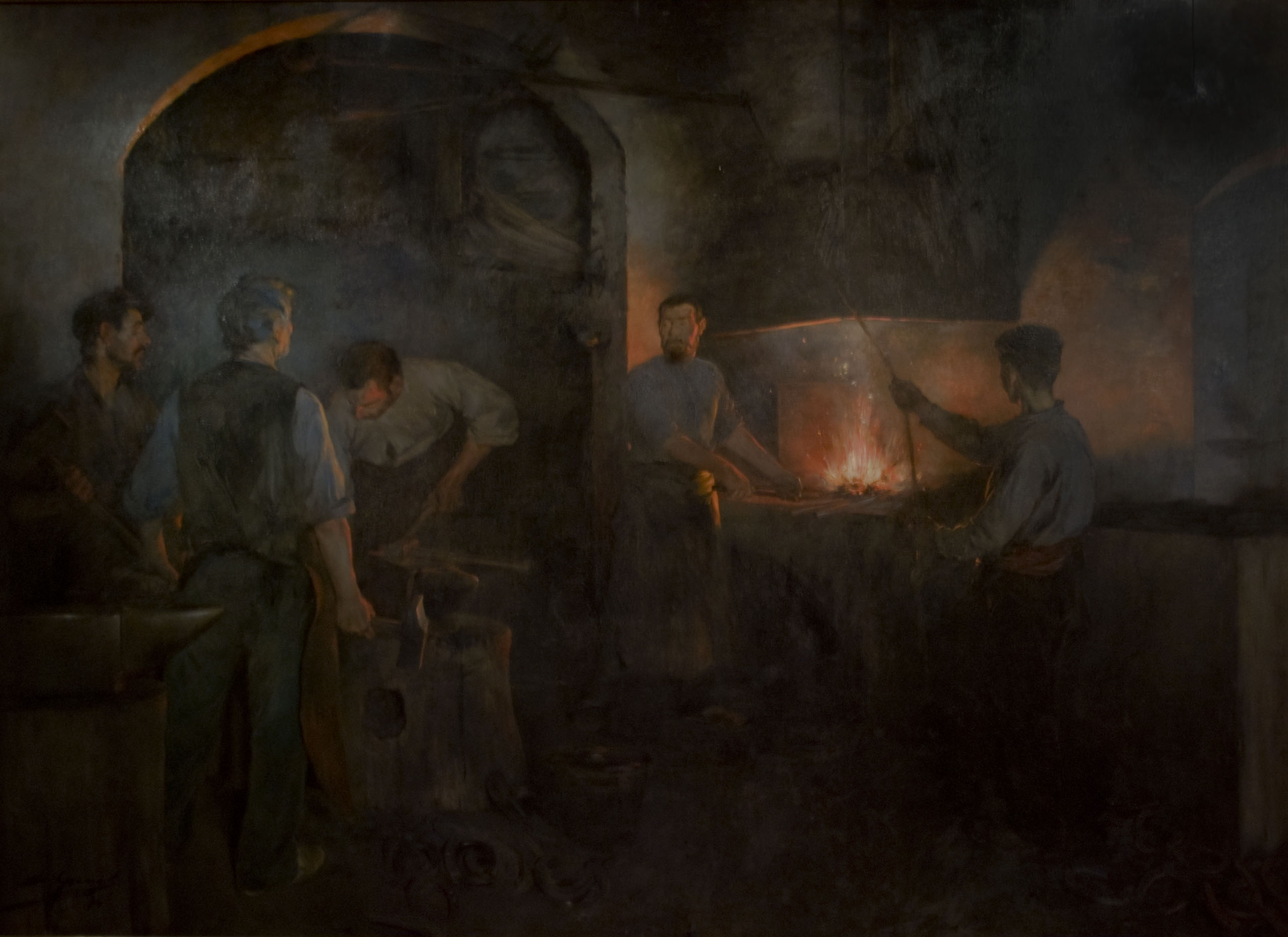
The smithy

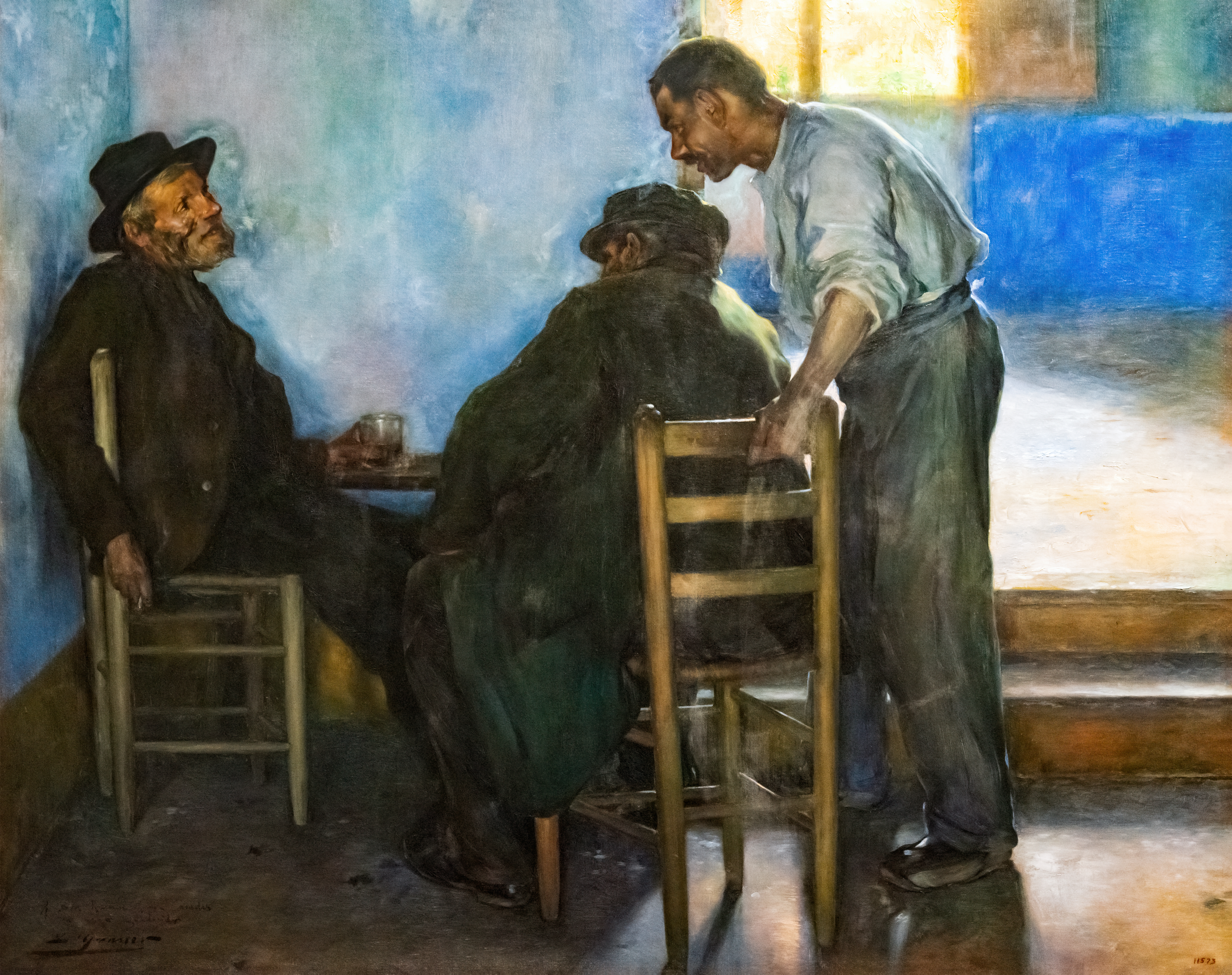
Tavern interior

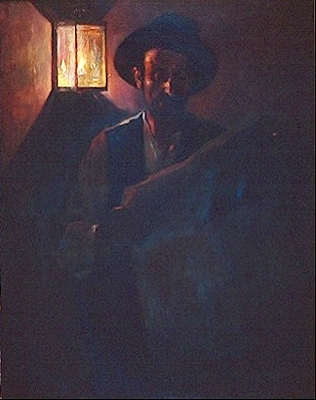
The Latest News

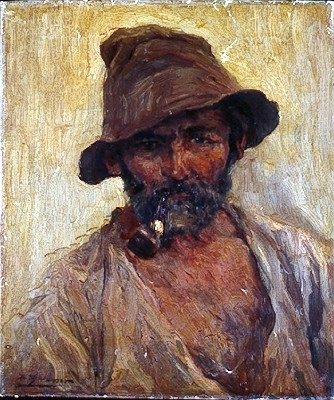
Smoker

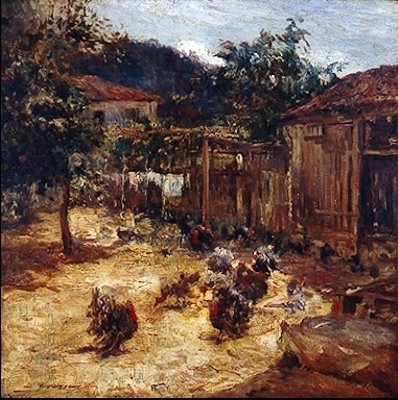
Turkeys in the Sun

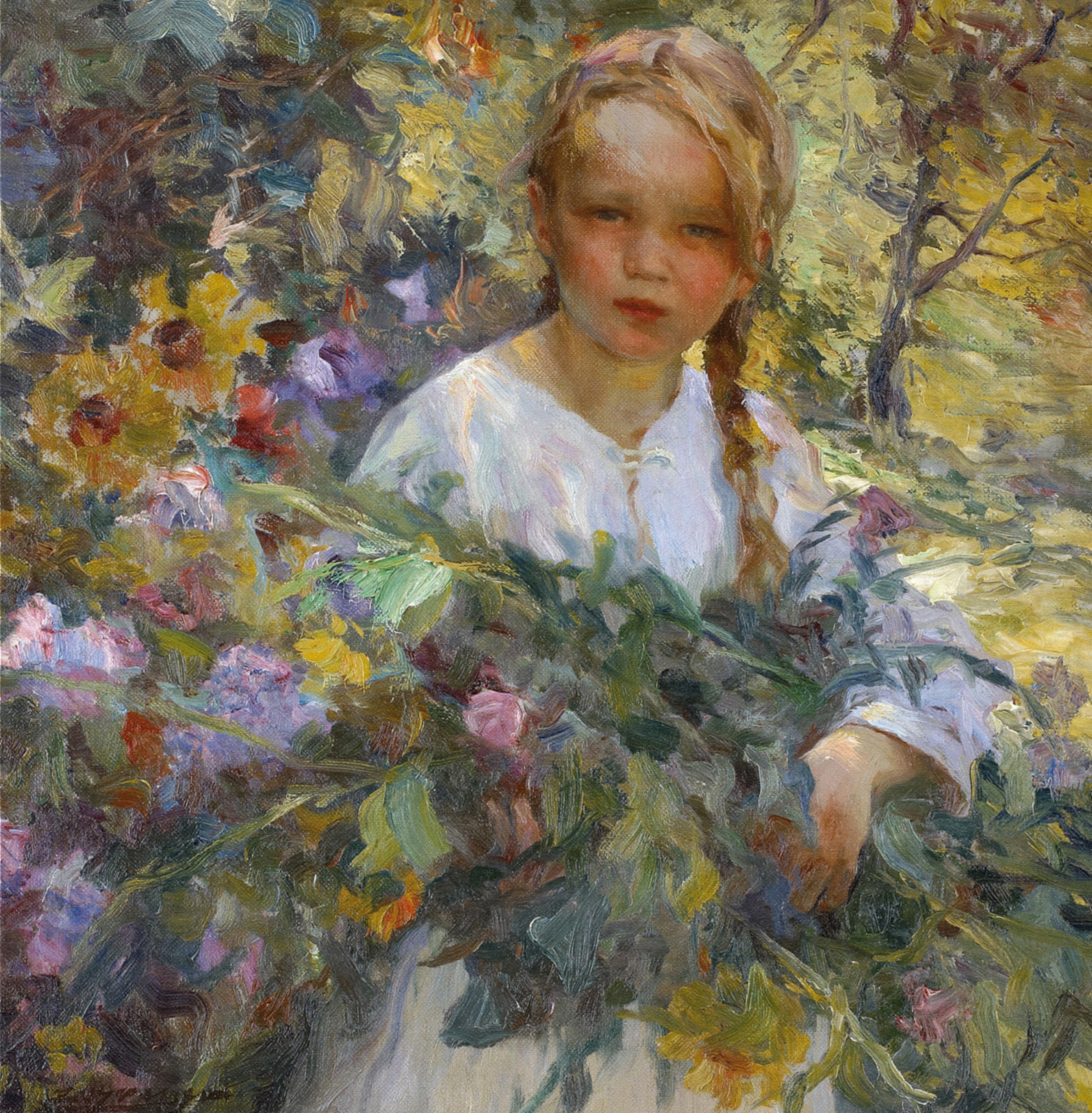
A Girl with Flowers
