= An account of the lives and works of the most eminent Spanish painters, sculptors and architects =

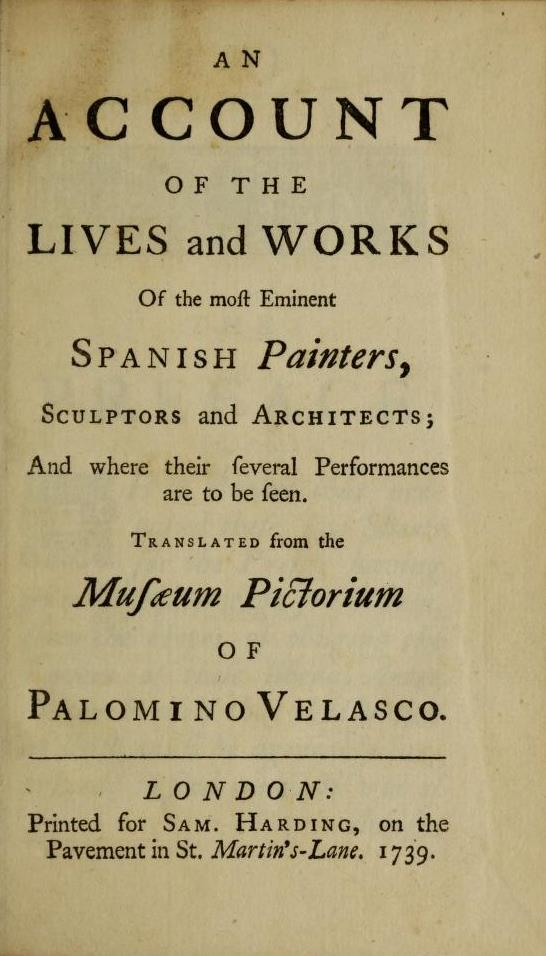
- Author: Antonio Palomino
- Original title: El parnaso español pintoresco y laureado
- Language: Spanish
- Published: 1724
- Publication place: Spain
- English publication date: 1739

An account of the lives and works of the most eminent Spanish painters, sculptors and architects is a book written by the Spanish painter Antonio Palomino and dedicated to the biographies of the most eminent artists who worked in Spain during the so-called Siglo de Oro, the golden age of Spanish art.

It was published for the first time in the original Spanish edition in 1724, entitled El parnaso español pintoresco y laureado and appearing as the third and last volume of Palomino's El museo pictorico y escala optica, featuring also biographies of Italian artists who worked in Spain (Pietro Torrigiano, Tiziano, Sofonisba Anguissola, Federico Zuccari, Luca Giordano and many others) as well as Flemish artists (Antonio Moro, Pieter Paul Rubens). The book includes the first biographies ever published of many Spanish artists, Diego Velázquez among others, and was translated and published in English, French and German during the 18th century; the English translation appeared in 1739.

The book has been described as "the starting point for all students of Spanish painting".

== Artists treated ==
Note: page numbers next to artists' names refer to the English edition of 1739 (see external links below).

- Antonio del Rincon; p. 1
- Torrigiano Torrigiani; p. 2
- Julio e Alexandro (Italian artists, not identified); p. 3
- Alonzo Berruguete; p. 3
- Antonio Flores e Pedro Campagna; p. 4
- Fernando Gallegos; p. 4
- Diego de Arroyo; p. 5
- Blas de Prado; p. 5
- Cristopher de Utrecht; p. 5
- Antonio Moro; p. 5
- Juan Bautista el Bergamasco (Giovan Battista Castello detto il Bergamasco); p. 6
- Cristopher Lopez; p. 6
- Gaspar Becerra; p. 6
- Maesse Pedro Campagna; p. 7
- Juan Fernandez de Navarrete (El Mudo); p. 7
- Sofonisba Angusciola; p. 8
- Tiziano Vecellio Veneciano; p. 8
- Luqueto or Lucas Cangiafo; p. 8
- Fray Nicolas Fator; p. 9
- The Divine Morales (Luis de Morales); p. 9
- Sofonisba Gentilesca (Sofonisba Anguissola, erroneously published two times with two different names); p. 9
- Luis de Vargas; p. 10
- Michael de Barroso; p. 10
- Alonso Sanchez Coello; p. 10
- Fray Domingo Beltran; p. 11
- Juan Bautista de Toledo; p. 11
- Theodosio Mingot; p. 11
- Luis de Carbajal; p. 12
- Juan de Arte Villafagne; p. 12
- Juanes, Painter of Valencia (not identified); p. 12
- Juan Labrador; p. 13
- Mateo Peres de Alesio; p. 14
- Christoph Zarignena; p. 14
- Fernando Yagnes (Fernando Yáñez de la Almedina); p. 14
- Diego Polo (the younger); p. 15
- The Perolas: Juan e Francisco Perolas; p. 15
- Federico Zucchero; p. 16
- Romulo Cincinnato; p. 16
- Pompeyo Leoni (Pompeo Leoni); p. 16
- Caesar Arbasia (Cesare Arbasia); p. 17
- Bartholome de Cardenas; p. 17
- Peregrin de Bolonia (Pellegrino Tibaldi, detto il Pellegrini); p. 18
- Paul de Cespedes (Pablo de Céspedes); p. 18
- Bartholome Carducho (Bartolomeo Carducci); p. 19
- Juan Pantoja de la Cruz; p. 20
- Bartholome Gonzales; p. 20
- Juan de Juni e Gregorio Hernandez; p. 21
- Francisco Galeas; p. 21
- Juan de la Miseria; p. 22
- Pablo de las Roelas (Juan de las Roelas); p. 22
- Juan de Soto; p. 24
- Juan de Chirinos; p. 24
- Luis Pascuel Gaudin; p. 24
- Philip de Liagno; p. 25
- Patricio Caxes; p. 25
- Antonio Mohedano; p. 25
- Dominico Greco (El Greco); p. 27
- Augustin de Castillo; p. 27
- Diego de Romulo; p. 28
- Sanchez Cottan (Juan Sánchez Cotán); p. 28
- Francisco Ribalta and his son; p. 28
- Adriano Donado; p. 29
- Pedro de las Cuevas; p. 30
- Juan de Pegnalosa; p. 30
- Vicencio Carducho (Vincenzo Carducci); p. 30
- Juan Luis Zambrano; p. 31
- Augustin Leonardo; p. 31
- Antonio Lanchares; p. 31
- Juan Antonio Ceroni; p. 32
- Peter Paul Rubens; p. 32
- Juan de Castillo; p. 33
- Juan Martinez Montagnes; p. 33
- Eugenio Caxes; p. 34
- Pedro Orrente; p. 34
- Francisco Fernandez; p. 35
- Geronimo Hernandez; p. 35
- Luis Tristan (Luis Tristán de Escamilla); p. 35
- Diego de Lucena; p. 36
- Alonso Vasquez; p. 36
- Juan Bautista Mayno; p. 37
- Antonio de Contreras; p. 37
- Luis Fernandez; p. 37
- Pedro Nunges (Pedro Nunez); p. 38
- Francisco Pacheco; p. 38
- Diego Polo (the Younger); p. 39
- Joseph Leonardo; p. 39
- Domingo de la Rioja, Manuel de Contreras e Juan de Vejarano; p. 39
- Joseph de Ribera (lo Spagnoletto); p. 40
- Gregorio Bausa; p. 40
- Felix Castello; p. 41
- Francisco de Herrera (the Elder); p. 41
- Francisco Varela; p. 43
- Francesco Collantes (Francisco Collantes); p. 43
- Pedro de Obregon; p. 44
- Francisco Gassen; p. 44
- Don Juan Galvan; p. 44
- Christopher Vela; p. 45
- Bartolomé Román; p. 45
- Micier Pablo; p. 46
- Anton de Horfelin; p. 46
- J. Vanderhamen (Juan van der Hamen); p. 47
- Angelo Nardi; p. 47
- Estevan Marc; p. 48
- Juan de la Corte; p. 48
- Don Juan Bautista Crescencio (Giovanni Battista Crescenzi); p. 49
- Don Diego Velasquez da Silva; p. 49
- Francisco Lopez Caro; p. 56
- Francisco Zurbaran; p. 57
- Miguel e Geronimo Garcia; p. 58
- Juan de Toledo; p. 58
- Pedro Cuquet; p. 59
- Pedro de Moya; p. 60
- Ignatio Raeth; p. 61
- Cristopher Garcia Salmeron; p. 61
- Joseph de Arfe; p. 62
- Pablo Pontos; p. 62
- Don Francisco Ximenez; p. 63
- Manuel Pereyra; p. 64
- Don Eugenio de las Cuevas; p. 64
- Don Francisco Caro; p. 65
- Sebastian Martinez (Sebastián Martínez Domedel); p. 65
- Antonio de Castillo y Saavedra; p. 66
- Alonzo de Messa; p. 69
- Pedro Valpuesta; p. 70
- Joseph de Sarabia; p. 70
- Adrian Rodriguez; p. 71
- Don Antonio Pereda; p. 71
- Juan de Pareja; p. 73
- Don Juan Bautista del Mazo Martinez (Juan Bautista Martínez del Mazo); p. 75
- Juan Sanchez Barba; p. 77
- Juan de Arellano; p. 77
- Miguel Mark; p. 78
- Joseph de Ledesma; p. 79
- Benito Manuel de Aguero; p. 80
- Juan Antonio Escalante (Juan Antonio de Frías y Escalante); p. 80
- Don Sebastian de Herrera Barnuevo; p. 81
- Bernabe Ximenez de Illescas; p. 83
- Francisco Camilo; p. 83
- Luis de Sotomayor; p. 85
- Juan Martinez de Cabezalero; p. 86
- Andres de Vargas; p. 86
- Ambrosio Martinez; p. 87
- Joseph Moreno; p. 87
- Phelipe Gil (Felipe Gil de Mena); p. 88
- Matheo Cerezo (Mateo Cerezo); p. 89
- Juan Ricci; p. 90
- Pedro Antonio; p. 91
- Don Joseph Antonilez; p. 91
- Don Antonio Bela; p. 92
- Franciscos Palacios; p. 93
- Cornelio Scut; p. 93
- Alonso Cano; p. 94
- Don Antonio Garcia Reynoso; p. 97
- Michael Geronimo de Ciezar; p. 99
- Manuel de Molina; p. 100
- Geronimo de Bobadilla; p. 100
- Don Juan de Alfaro (Juan de Alfaro y Gamez); p. 101
- Enrique de la Marinas; p. 104
- Jacinto Geronimo de Espinosa; p. 105
- Juan de Guzman; p. 105
- Joseph Romani (maybe the Italian painter Giuseppe Romani); p. 106
- Jusepe Martinez and his son; p. 108
- Juan Montero de Roxas; p. 109
- Don Francisco de Solis; p. 109
- Dionis Mantuano; p. 110
- Antonio de Arias Fernandez; p. 111
- Don Juan de Revenga; p. 112
- Don Francisco Rici; p. 112
- Alonzo del Barco; p. 113
- Ignacio de Iriarte; p. 114
- Don Francisco de Herrera; p. 115
- Don Juan Carregno (Juan Carreño de Miranda); p. 117
- Don Bartholome Murillo; p. 119
- Don Joseph Ramirez; p. 122
- Don Joseph Donoso; p. 122
- Manuel Gutierrez; p. 124
- Simon de Leon Leal; p. 124
- Lorenzo de Soto; p. 125
- Pedro Athanasio (Pedro Atanasio Bocanegra); p. 126
- Nicolas de Villacis; p. 127
- Antonio Castrejon; p. 127
- Sebastian Munoz; p. 128
- Juan de Valdes (Juan de Valdés Leal); p. 129
- Juan de Laredo; p. 130
- Bartolome Perez; p. 130
- Claudio Coello; p. 131
- Pedro de Mena; p. 132
- Juan Arnau; p. 133
- Gabriel de la Corte; p. 133
- Juan de Sevilla; p. 134
- Joseph de Ciezar (José De Cieza); p. 135
- Juan Cano de Arevalo; p. 135
- Diego Gonzales de la Vega; p. 136
- Juan Nino de Guevara; p. 136
- Alonso del Arco; p. 138
- Eugenio Gutierrez de Torices; p. 139
- Pedro Roldan; p. 139
- Pedro Nunez de Villavicencio; p. 140
- Francisco Ochoa y Antonilez (Francisco Antolínez); p. 141
- Alonso de los Rios; p. 142
- Francisco Guirro; p. 143
- Mateo Gilarte; p. 143
- Bartholome Vicente; p. 144
- Francisco de Vera Cabeza de Baca; p. 145
- Pablo Rabiella, Francisco Plano (Francisco del Plano); p. 145
- Gregorio de Mesa; p. 146
- Miguel de Rubiales; p. 146
- Isidoro Arredondo; p. 147
- Mosen Vicente Bru; p. 148
- Vicente de Benavides; p. 148
- Luisa Roldan; p. 149
- Lucas Jordan (Luca Giordano); p. 150
- Francisco Ignacio Ruiz de la Iglesia; p. 156
- Joachin Juncola; p. 158
- Senen Vila; p. 159
- Juan Vanchesel (Jan van Kessel, junior); p. 161
- Francisco Perez Sierra; p. 162
- Pedro Ruiz Gonzales; p. 164
- Geronimo Secano; p. 165
- Lorenzo Montero; p. 166
- Mathias de Torres; p. 167
- Francesco Leonardoni; p. 169
- Juan Conchillos; p. 170
- Vicente Victoria; p. 172
- Gaspar de la Huerta; p. 173
- Joseph de Mora; p. 174
