= Andrés de Vargas =

Spanish painter (1613–1647)

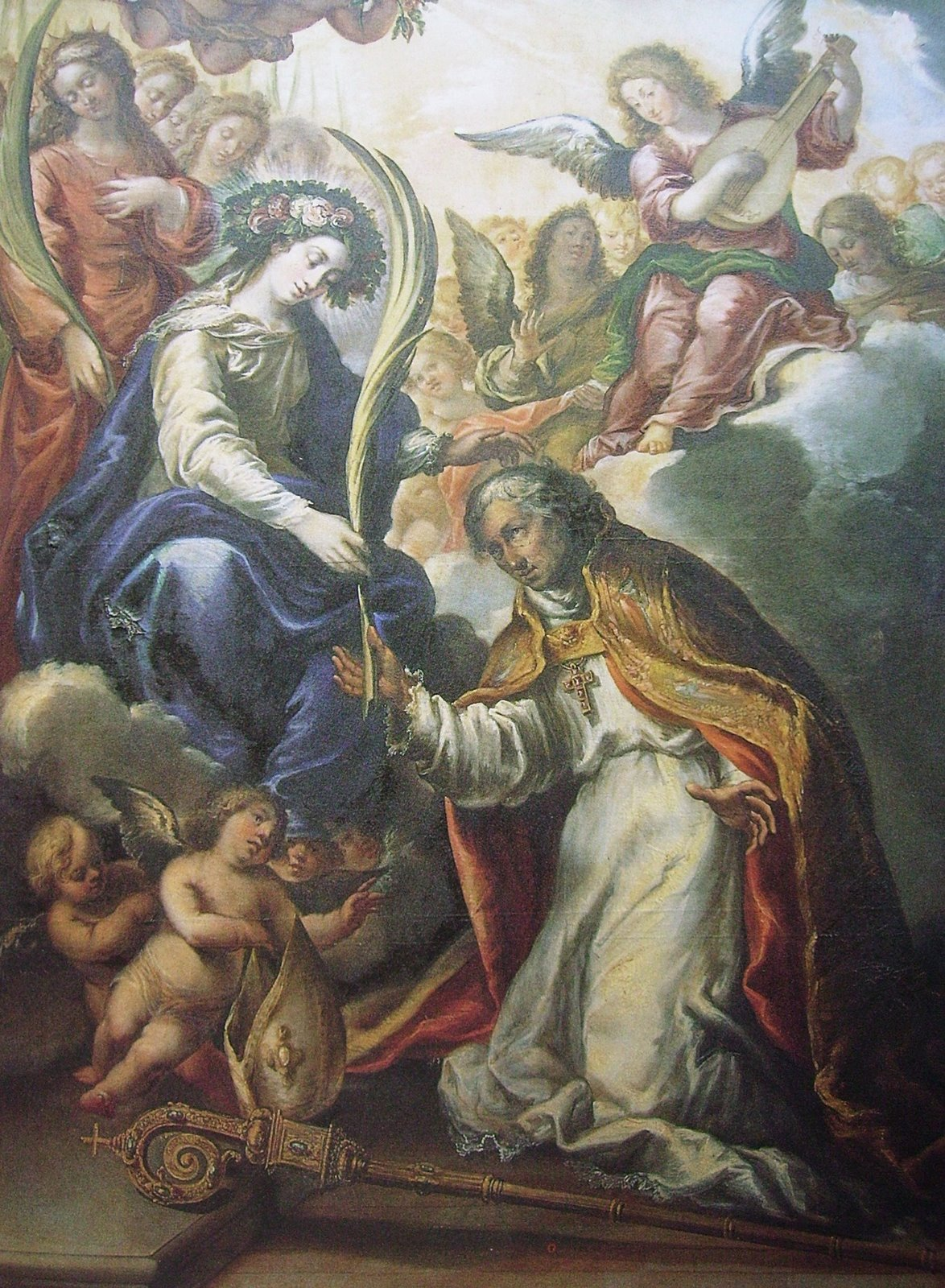
La Virgen entrega la palma a San Julián, Cuenca Cathedral, capilla del Sagrario.

Andrés de Vargas (1613–1647) was a Spanish painter. He was born at Cuenca, and came to Madrid as a young man. He studied under Francisco Camilo. He painted religious works for the friaries as well as for private patrons of Madrid. He painted works for the cathedral and churches of Cuenca. He painted a series of frescoes in the Our Lady of the Sagrario by order of the Chapter of Cuenca. His style was called by Juan Agustín Ceán Bermúdez "feeble," and injurious to his art was Vargas' practice of regulating the quality of his pictures by their price.

== Works ==
- Transverberación de Santa Teresa (1644)
- Martirio del brasero, later at the Museo de la Trinidad
- Ascensión de la Magdalena
- San Roque (1663), San Miguel church, Cuenca

== Bibliography ==
- Angulo Íñiguez, Diego, and Pérez Sánchez, Alfonso E. Pintura madrileña del segundo tercio del siglo XVII, 1983, Madrid, Instituto Diego Velázquez, CSIC, ISBN 84-00-05635-3.
- Palomino, Antonio, An account of the lives and works of the most eminent Spanish painters, sculptors and architects, 1724, first English translation, 1739, p. 86
- Palomino, Antonio (1988). El museo pictórico y escala óptica III. El parnaso español pintoresco laureado. Madrid, Aguilar S.A. de Ediciones. ISBN 84-03-88005-7.
- Pérez Sánchez, Alfonso E. (1992). Baroque Paintings from Spain, 1600–1750 (Pintura barroca en España 1600–1750). Madrid, Ediciones Cátedra. ISBN 84-376-0994-1.
