= Antonio Castrejon =

Spanish painter (1625–1690)

Antonio Castrejon (1625–1690) was a Spanish painter.

== Life ==
Castrejon was born at Madrid in 1625. He was a pupil of Francisco Fernandez, and possessed more facility in colouring than skill in drawing. His best works are of small dimensions, but he sometimes painted large altar-pieces, as the Martyrdom of Santa Lucia, in the church of San Felipe el Real at Madrid, which was destroyed by fire in 1718. He painted figures in the architectural pieces of Roque Ponce and of Josef Garcia, and groups within the flower-garlands of Gabriel de la Corte. He died at Madrid in 1690.

== Sources ==
- Antonio Palomino, An account of the lives and works of the most eminent Spanish painters, sculptors and architects, 1724, first English translation, 1739, p. 127
- Allende-Salazar, Juan, José Antolínez, pintor madrileño, Boletín de la Sociedad Española de Excursiones, vol. XXIII, Madrid, 1915.
- Agulló Cobo, Mercedes (1981). Más noticias sobre pintores madrileños de los siglos XVI al XVIII. Madrid: Excmo. Ayuntamiento de Madrid. ISBN 84-500-4974-1.
- Gutiérrez Pastor, Ismael, Antonio de Castrejón como retratista y otras obras de su hijo Baltasar, Anuario del Departamento de Historia y Teoría del Arte, (UAM), vol. III, 1991, p. 101-108.
- Salvador Prieto, Ma. Socorro, Una Inmaculada de Antonio Castrejón, pintor del siglo XVII, V Jornadas de Arte (5th Arts Journal). Velázquez and the Art of his Time, CSIC, editorial Alpuerto, Madrid, 1991, ISBN 84-381-0164-X, p. 289-294

Attribution:
