= Nicolás de Villacis =

Spanish painter

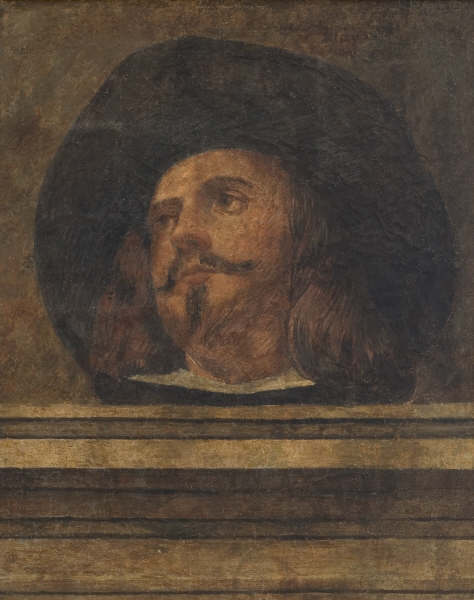
- Caballero del chambergo, Museo de Bellas Artes de Murcia.
- Born: 9 September 1616; Murcia
- Died: 8 April 1694 (aged 77); Murcia
- Occupation: artist

Nicolás de Villacis (9 September 1616 – 8 April 1694) was a Spanish Baroque painter from Murcia, a disciple of Diego Velázquez.

He met Velázquez (their relationship is reported by Antonio Palomino) in Madrid during his youth, and later studied in Italy, where he is documented in 1643 and where he established an atelier at Como. He returned to Murcia around 1650, where he executed his most famous works, the mural paintings of the Trinity Convent.

== Bibliography ==
- Antonio Palomino, An account of the lives and works of the most eminent Spanish painters, sculptors and architects, 1724, first English translation, 1739, p. 127
- Doval Trueba, María del Mar, co-published with: Pérez Sánchez, Alfonso E. (2003). Los "velazqueños": pintores que trabajaron en el taller de Velázquez., Vol. I, Complutense University, Madrid. ISBN 84-669-1050-6.
- López Jiménez, José Crisanto (1964). Don Nicolás de Villacis Arias, discípulo de Velázquez. University of Valladolid, Boletín del Seminario de Estudios de Arte y Arqueología, Volume 30, p. 195-210. ISSN 0210-9573.
- Pina Pérez, Ángel (1992). Los frescos de Villacis en la iglesia del convento de la Trinidad: historia de una tragedia, Murcia: Verdolay, Revista del Museo Arqueológico de Murcia, no. 4, p. 203-210. ISSN 1130-9776.
