= Félix Castello =

Spanish painter (1595–1651)

Félix Castello or Castelo (4 July 1595 – 12 September 1651) was a Spanish painter of the Baroque period.

== Early life ==
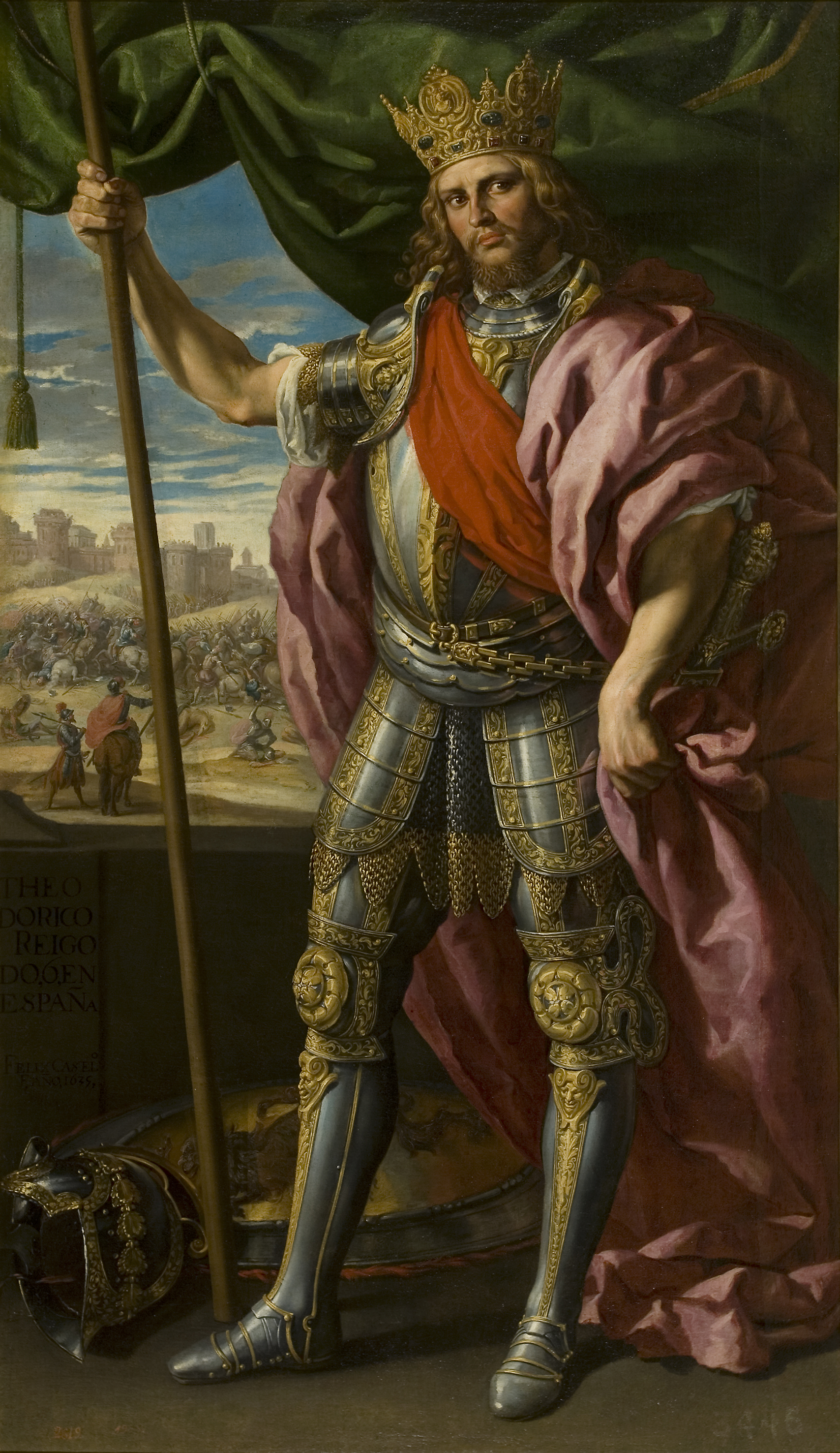
Felix Castello, Theodoric, King of the Goths, 1635.

He was born and died in Madrid. His father, Fabrizio Castello, was a painter for King Philip II of Spain in El Escorial, the palace of Alba de Tormes, and the Palacio de Pardo. His mother died in childbirth in 1608. Felix's grandfather was the painter Giovanni Battista Castello (known as Il Bergamasco). He later trained with Vincenzo Carducci and Bartolomeo Carducci. In December 1615, he married Catherine de Argüello. Two years later, he received the title of Painter to the King, which was made vacant on the death of his father,

== Career ==
Castello's style was very similar to Carducci's, and therefore, there have been challenges in identifying attributions. It seems likely he remained several years working as an officer in Carducci's workshop, because until 1633, there is no documentation of his work as an independent painter. In 1627, he was called for the second time as Painter to the King position, left vacant now after Bartolomé González y Serrano's death.

Castello painted for the chapel of Santo Cristo de la Paciencia in the Convent of the Capuchins. He also painted for the cloister of the Convent of Santa Barbara. He is also said to have contributed along with Alonso Cano and others to the portraits of kings for the Royal Palace of Madrid. He also worked on the Lactation of the Virgin to St. Bernard, in the church of San Juan in Telde ( Gran Canaria ), and some works attributed by stylistic similarity, among which the Saint Francis of Assisi at the Prado Museum.

== Later life ==
The next documented event in his life comes in November 1647, when he is widowed, and then remarried soon after to Barbara Huete (February 1648). He died in Madrid on 12 September 1651.

== Sources ==
- Antonio Palomino, An account of the lives and works of the most eminent Spanish painters, sculptors and architects, 1724, first English translation, 1739, p. 41
- Madrazo, Pedro de (1872). Catálogo Descriptivo e Histórico del Museo del Prado de Madrid (Parte Primera: Escuelas Italianas y Españolas). Calle del Duque de Osuna #3; Original from Oxford University, Digitized 1 May 2007: M. Rivadeneyra. p. 375.
- Angulo Iñiguez, Diego, and Pérez Sánchez, Alfonso E. Painting Madrid the first third of the seventeenth century, 1969, Madrid: Diego Velazquez Institute, CSIC,
- Pérez Sánchez, Alfonso E. (1992). Baroque Painting in Spain 1600-1750. Madrid: Ediciones Chair. ISBN 84-376-0994-1.
- Corpus Velazquez. Documents and Texts, volume I, Madrid, 2000, Ministry of Education, p. 66. ISBN 84-369-3345-1
