= Imlac (disambiguation) =

IMLAC was an American graphical display systems manufacturer.

Imlac may also refer to:

- A fictional philosopher in Samuel Johnson's novella, The History of Rasselas, Prince of Abissinia
- A city in the State of Georgia, in Meriwether County; see List of places in Georgia (U.S. state) (I–R)
- A philosophical artificial intelligence in the Vincent Cespedes's essay Le Monde est flou: L'avenir des intelligences ("Hazy World: The future of intelligences"); an acronym for "Intelligent Matricial Language About Concepts"
