= Roque Ponce =

Spanish landscape painter

Roque Ponce (late 17th century) was a Spanish painter of landscapes, active in Madrid, where he trained with Juan de la Corte. He flourished around the year 1690. In some of his pictures, the figures are by Antonio Castrejon.
