= Antonio Arias =

Antonio Arias may refer to:

- Antonio Arias (mayor) (c. 1847–1913), mayor of Ponce, Puerto Rico in 1903
- Antonio Arias (footballer) (born 1944), Chilean football player
- Antonio Fernández Arias (died 1684), Spanish painter of the Baroque period
- Antonio Arias Arias, Spanish Republican Air Force pilot and air ace
- Antonio Arias (referee) (born 1972), Paraguayan football referee
