= Francisco Pérez Sierra =

Neapolitan painter (1627–1709)

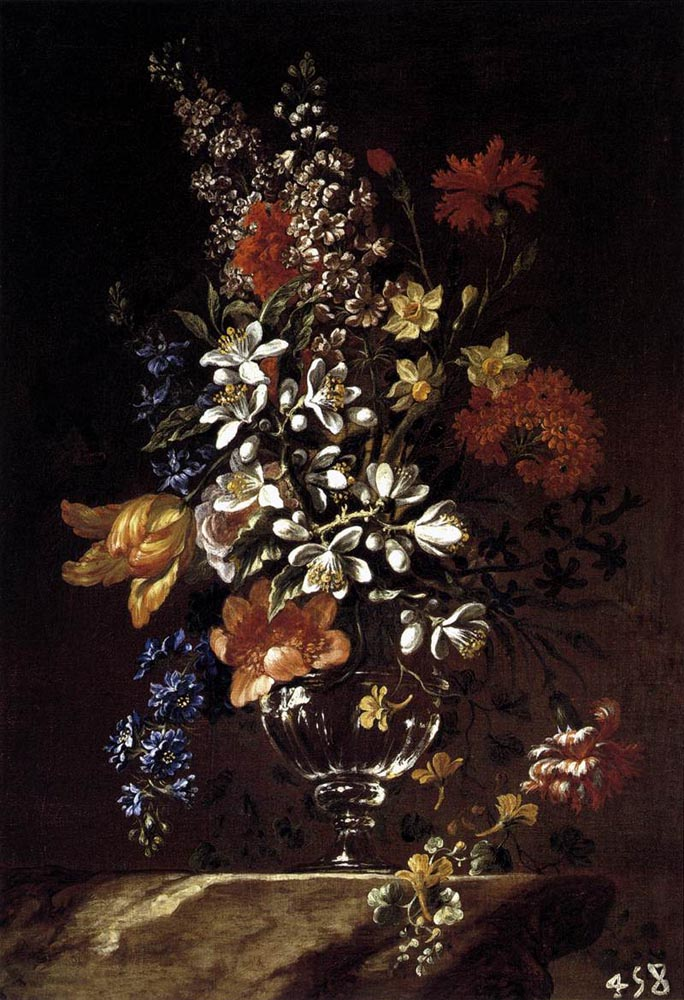
Vase of Flowers (c. 1690)

Francisco Pérez Sierra (c. 1627 in Naples – 1709) was a Neapolitan painter of Spanish descent. According to Antonio Palomino, he was the son of a Spanish general. He was a disciple of Aniello Falcone and Juan de Toledo. Numerous works that he painted included the Immaculate Conception, painted in 1655 in the convent of the Trinitarias de Madrid, Santa Ana conduciendo a la Virgen which is now at the Museo del Prado and Saint Joachim which is now at the Museo de Bellas Artes de Granada, he also painted Vase of Flowers in around 1690 (oil on panel, 62x43 cm) which is now at the Royal Palace in Madrid.
