= Antonio Mohedano =

Spanish painter

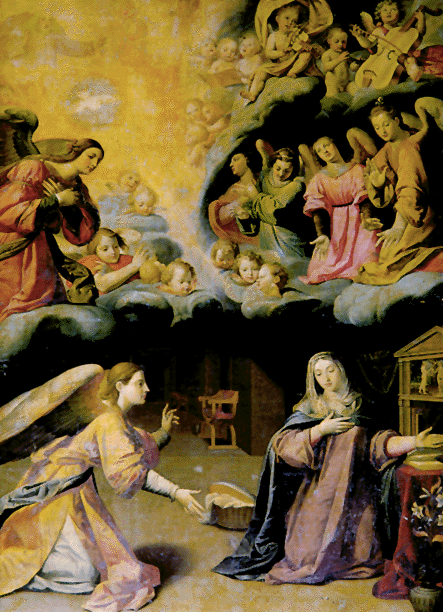
La Anunciación, by Mohedano in the Church of the Anunciación, Sevilla.

Antonio Mohedano (1561–1625) was a Spanish painter of the Renaissance period.

It is assumed that he was born at Lucena, to a magistrate of Antequera, since he is referred to as a vecino of Antequera and a native (natural) of Lucena. He trained with Pablo de Céspedes, after his return to Córdoba in 1577. He started by painting " sargas" and the leathern hangings for rooms, which were then in general use. Having seen the frescoes of Julio and Alessandro, at Granada, and those of the Perolas, at El Viso, his admiration led him to copy many figures from those works, and to adopt that style of painting. Along with Alonso Vazquez, he painted frescoes for the great cloister of the Franciscans at Seville. In the Sacristy of Cathedral of Córdoba with the Perolas, he painted some now extant frescoes on devotional subjects.

It is not known where Mohedano lived; he may have moved from city to city, and from convent to convent, halting wherever he found occupation for his pencil. His last years, however, were spent at Lucena, where he painted for the high altar for the principal church, and where he died.

Two of his love-sonnets, of little interest, have been preserved in the anthology of his friend, Pedro de Espinosa, who also printed, in the same collection, a sonnet in his honour.
