= Pedro de las Cuevas =

Spanish painter

Pedro de las Cuevas, a Spanish painter, was born at Madrid in 1568. According to Palomino, he painted several pictures for private collections, for which he was more employed than for public edifices. He gained, however, more celebrity by his academy than by his own works. Some of the most distinguished painters of the time, such as José Leonardo, Antonio Pereda, Antonio Arias, and Juan Carreño, were educated in his school, called the School of Madrid, which was distinguished for its extraordinary and masterly colouring. He died at Madrid in 1635. His stepson, Francisco Camilo was also his pupil.
