= Francisco Caro =

Spanish painter

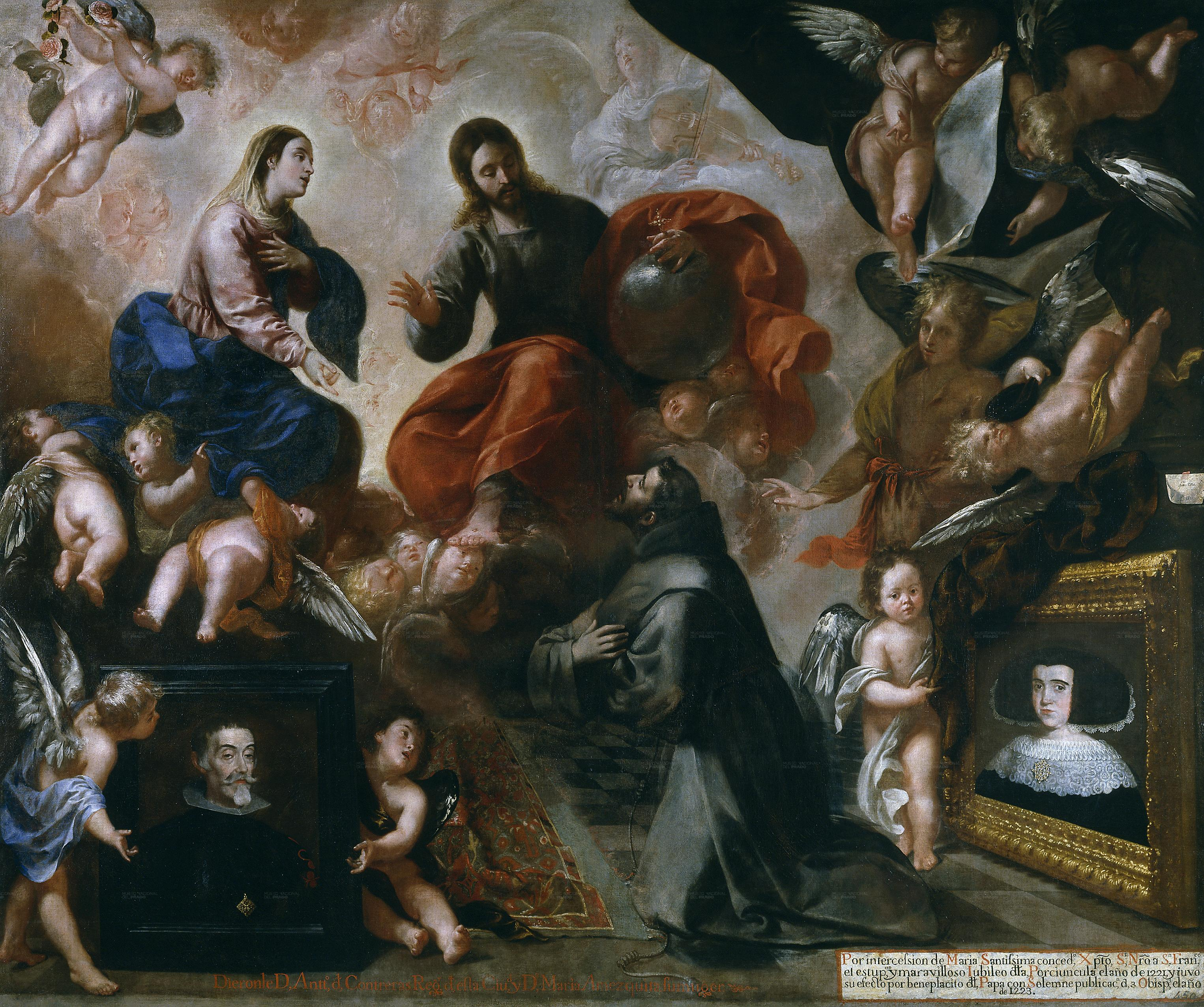
Francis of Assisi in the Portiuncula with donors Antonio Contreras and Maria Amezqueta, 1659, now at the Museo del Prado in Madrid.

Francisco Caro (1627 – 1667) was a Spanish Baroque painter.

== Life ==
Caro was the son of Francisco Lopez Caro, and was born at Seville in 1627. He received his initial artistic education from his father, but later went to Madrid, where he studied under of Alonso Cano. According to Antonio Palomino his most important l works were the Life of the Virgin, in the chapel of San Isidoro in the church of St. Andrew, and the celebrated Porciuncula, for the church of San Francisco at Segovia, now in the collection of the Prado in Madrid.

He died at Madrid in 1667.
