= Juan de Alfaro y Gámez =

Spanish painter

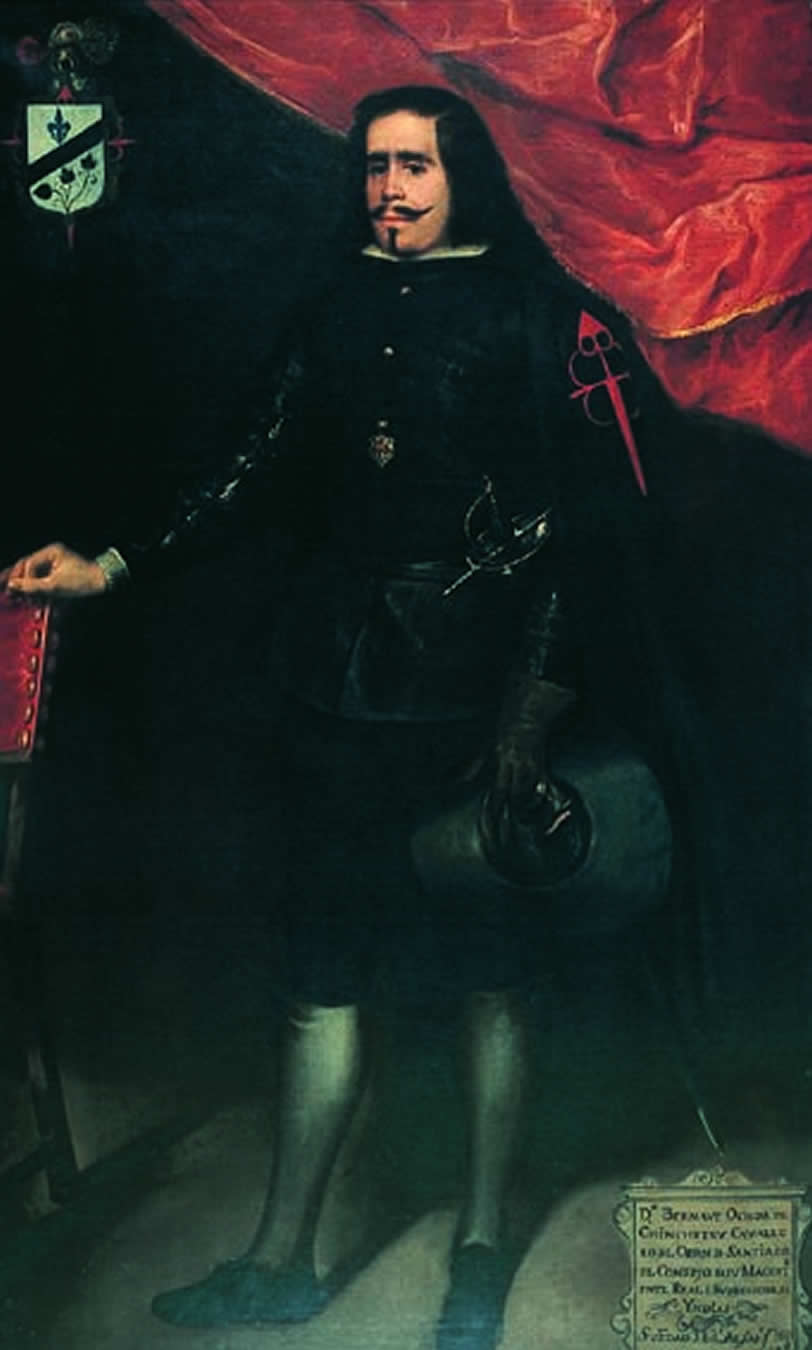
Portrait of Don Bernabe Ochoa Chinchetru by Juan de Alfaro y Gámez, Museo de Bellas Artes de Córdoba, 1661

Juan de Alfaro y Gámez (1643–1680) was a Spanish painter of the Baroque. He was born at Córdoba. He was first a pupil of Antonio del Castillo, but finished his studies at Madrid under Velázquez, whose manner he followed, particularly in portraits. He was employed by Velazquez in copying the works of Titian, Rubens, and Van Dyck. In the church of the Carmelites is an Incarnation and in the church of the Imperial College at Madrid is his picture of the Guardian Angel.

The biographer Antonio Palomino relates a story which proves that he possessed more vanity than skill. Being employed to paint subjects from the life of St. Francis for the cloister of the convent of that name, he took them from prints, but had the folly to put to each of them Alfaro pinxit. His first master, Castillo, to chastise his vanity, obtained permission to paint one, and placed at the bottom non pinxit Alfaro, which passed into a proverb.

He was fond of travelling, was well versed in literature, wrote poetry, and some interesting notes on the lives of Becerra, Céspedes, and Velazquez. He painted the portrait of Calderón de la Barca, which was placed over the tomb of the poet in the church of San Salvador in Madrid. His conduct towards his patron, the Admiral of Castile, has left a greater stain on his memory than even his vanity. He forsook the admiral when he was banished, and meanly solicited his patronage when recalled: the repulse he received produced melancholy, and caused his death, which took place in Madrid.
