= Céspedes =

Céspedes is a Spanish patronymic surname, originating in Spain which is derived from the Spanish césped, meaning "grass; fields." It would have likely denoted a farmer or gardener. It can refer to:

- Alba de Céspedes, Cuban-Italian writer
- Augusto Céspedes Patzi, Bolivian writer, journalist, politician, and diplomat,
- Carlos Manuel de Céspedes, Cuban independence fighter
- Carlos Manuel de Céspedes y Quesada, Cuban writer, politician, diplomat, and President of Cuba
- Eleno de Céspedes (1545-1588 or later), possible intersex person
- Gonzalo de Céspedes y Meneses, Spanish novelist
- Gregorio Céspedes, Spanish missionary
- Jair Céspedes (born 1984), Peruvian soccer player
- Manuel Hilario de Céspedes y García Menocal (born 1944), a bishop of the Roman Catholic Diocese of Matanzas, Cuba
- Pablo de Céspedes, Spanish painter, poet, and architect
- Robert Cespedes (born 1954), Thai actor and singer
- Vincent Cespedes (born 1973), French philosopher, writer and composer
- Yoelqui Céspedes (born 1997), Cuban baseball player
- Yoenis Céspedes (born 1985), Cuban baseball player
