= Antigüedad =

Coordinates: 41°57′N 4°07′W

- municipality
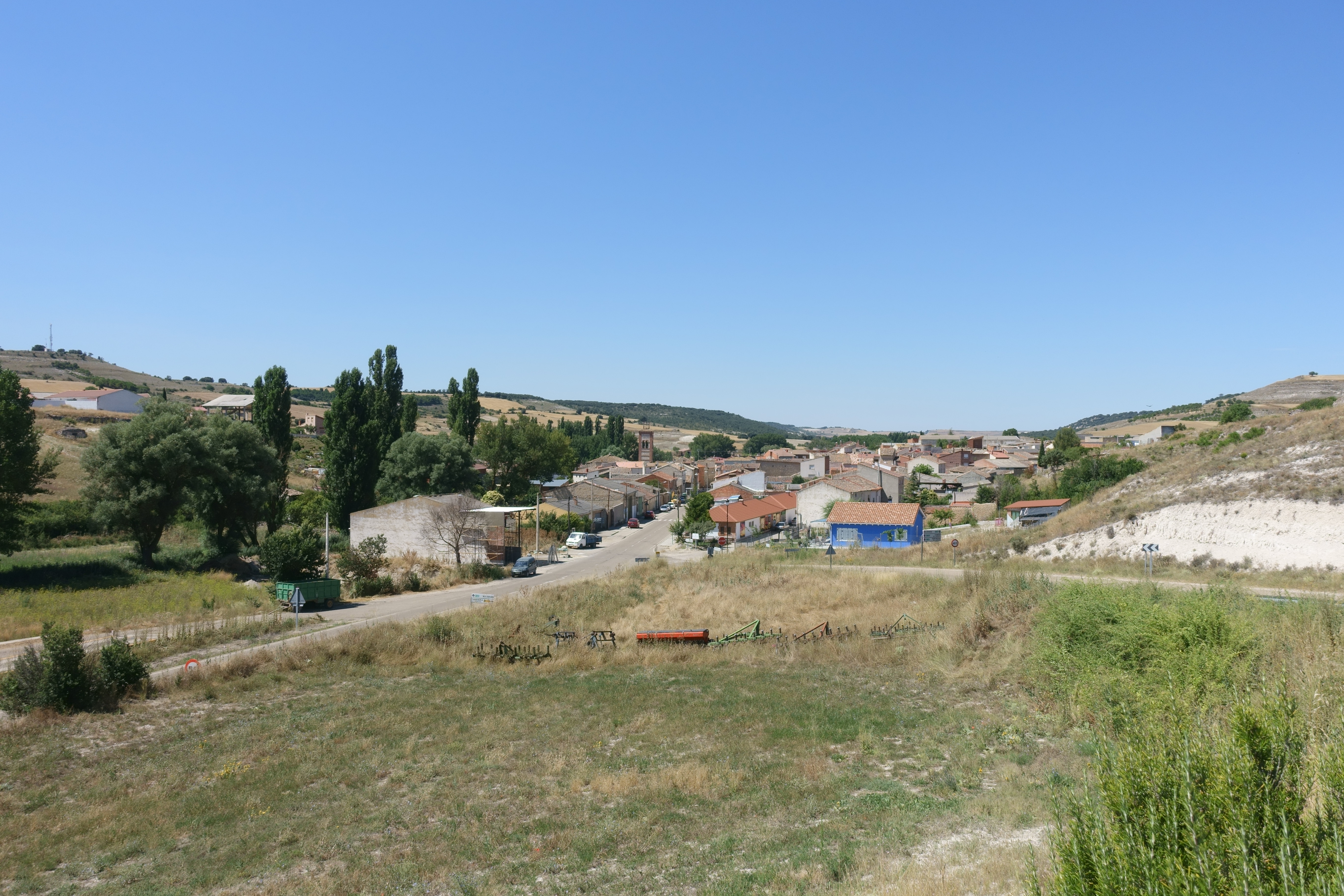

- Flag Coat of arms
- Interactive map of Antigüedad
- Country: Spain
- Autonomous community: Castile and León
- Province: Palencia
- Municipality: Antigüedad

Area
  - Total: 62.83 km^{2} (24.26 sq mi)
- Elevation: 830 m (2,720 ft)

Population (2004)
  - Total: 405
  - Density: 6.45/km^{2} (16.7/sq mi)
- Time zone: UTC+1 (CET)
  - Summer (DST): UTC+2 (CEST)
- Website: http://antiguedad.es

Antigüedad is a municipality located in the province of Palencia, Castile and León, Spain. According to the 2004 census (INE), the municipality had a population of 405 inhabitants.

== Notable people ==
Felipe Gil de Mena, baroque painter
