= Geronimo de Bobadilla =

Spanish painter

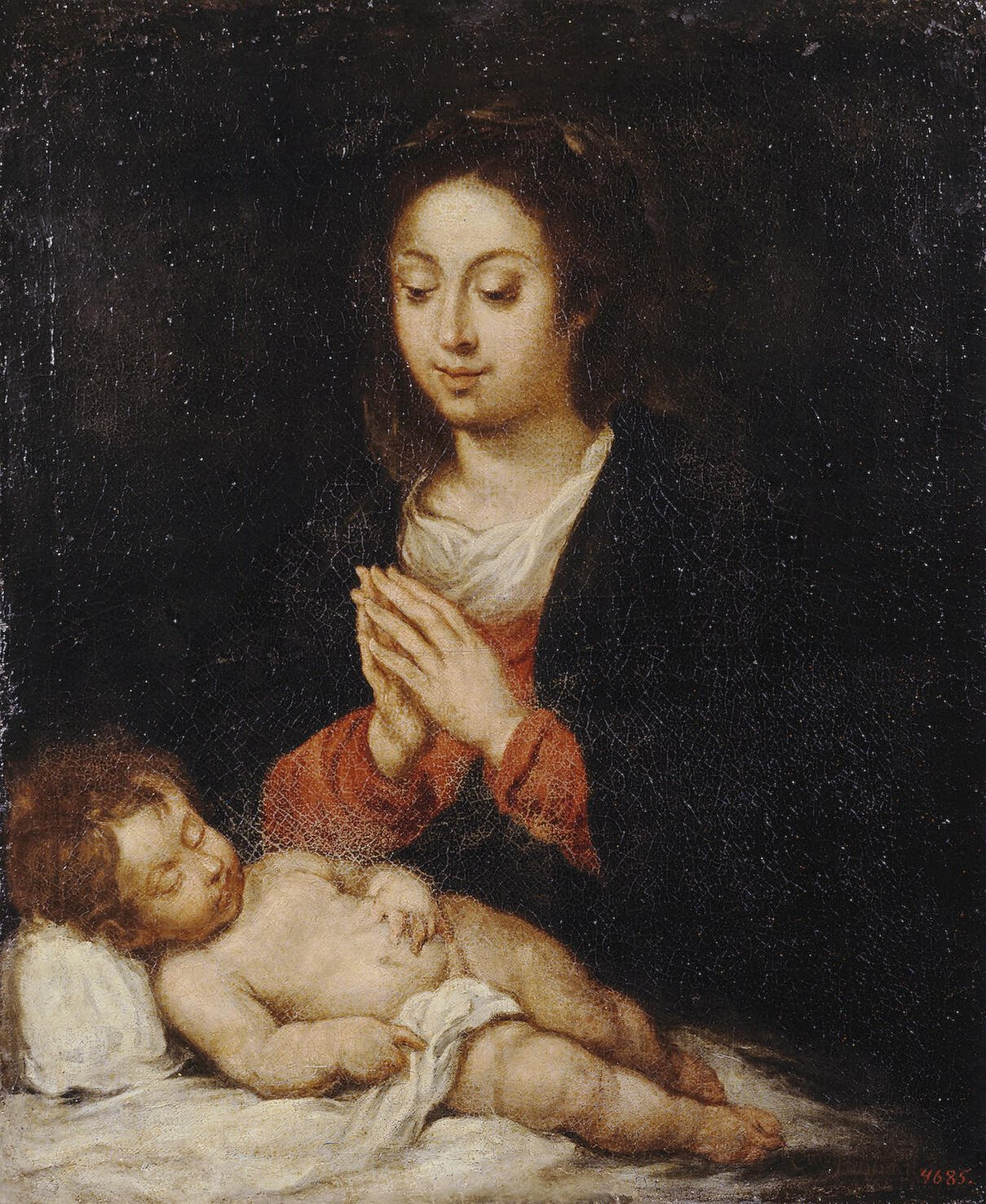
Virgin with the Christ Child Asleep by Geronimo de Bobadilla, Hermitage Museum, 1668

Geronimo de Bobadilla, also Jerónimo de Bobadilla, (1630–1709) was a Spanish painter.

He was born at Antequera, a small town in the vicinity of Málaga, and got married in 1659. According to Palomino, he was a scholar of Francisco Zurbarán, whose manner he followed. He excelled in painting historical subjects of a medium size and perspective views. He used a peculiar varnish on his pictures, which Murillo compared to crystal. He was a great collector of academic figures, drawings, models, and sketches of celebrated artists. He was one of the founders of the Academy at Seville in 1660, and according to art historian Juan Agustín Ceán Bermúdez, continued to support it until his death, which took place in that city in 1680.

In his few known works was a drawing of St. Joseph with the Christ Child signed in 1685 (Kunsthalle, Hamburg) issued by August L. Mayer, who noted the Murillo stylistic closeness, and four paintings with motifs of the infancy of Christ preserved in private collections and signed on the back with the notation that they were sold for 180 reales each. The Hermitage Museum also attributed to him the Virgin with the Christ Child Asleep, dated 1668.
