= Pedro Núñez del Valle =

Spanish painter

Pedro Núñez del Valle (Madrid, c. 1597 – 1649) was a Spanish painter of the Baroque era.

According to Antonio Palomino he was born in Madrid where he lived and worked for the rest of his life after studying in Rome. He was one of the painters concerned in drawing the pictures of the Kings in the Salón de Comedias.
