= Francisco Camilo =

Spanish artist (1610-1671)

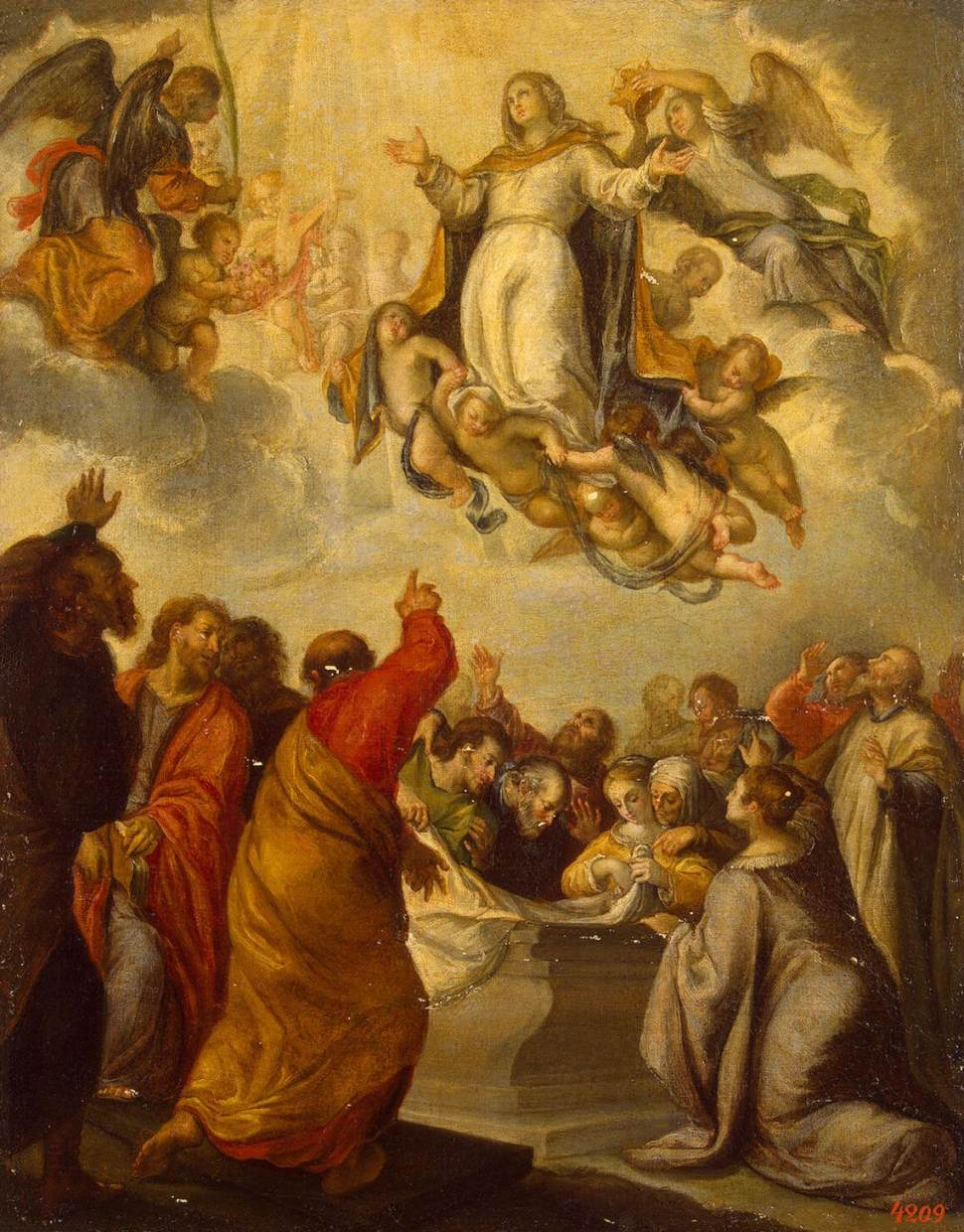
Assumption of the Virgin by Francisco Camilo, Hermitage Museum, 1666

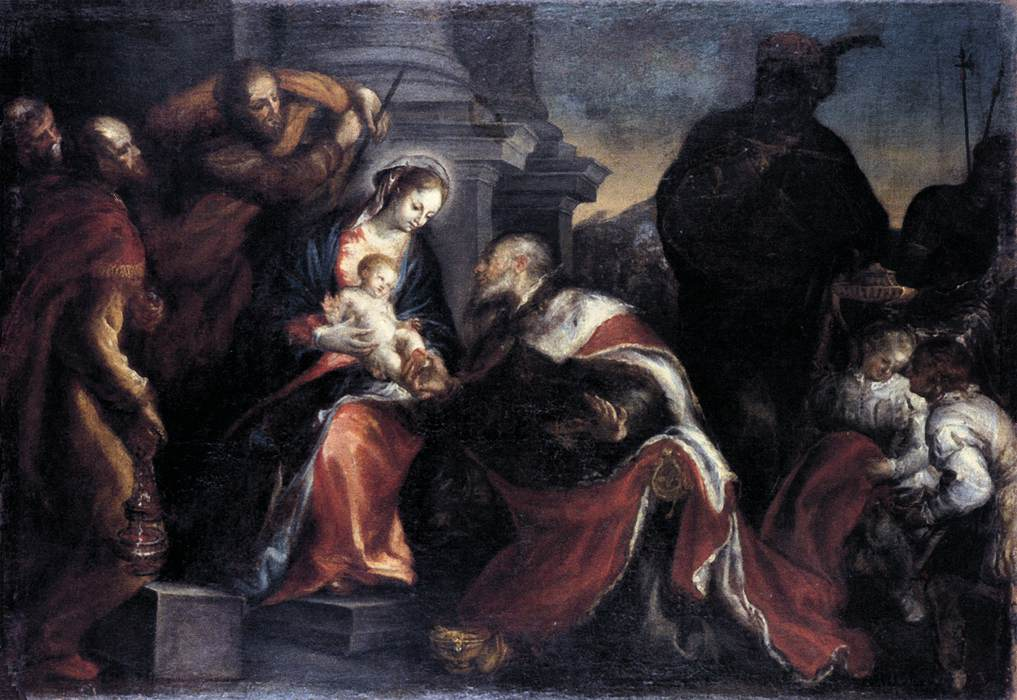
Adoration of the Kings, Museo de Bellas Artes de Bilbao.

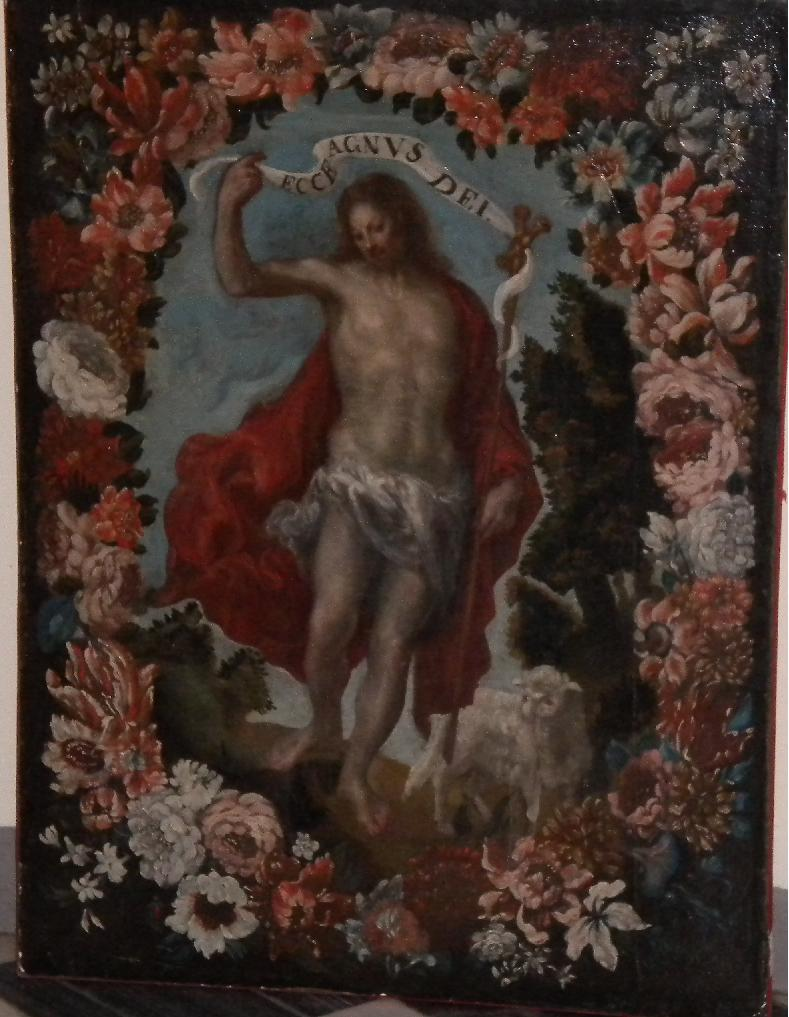
San Juan Bautista en Orla de Flores (private collection)

Francisco Camilo (Madrid 1610–Madrid 1671) was a Spanish painter, the son of an Italian immigrant who had settled in Madrid. When his father died, his mother remarried, and Camilo became the stepson of the painter Pedro de las Cuevas.

De las Cuevas brought Camilo up as his own son, teaching him to paint. At the age of 18, Camilo was asked to paint for the high altar of the Jesuits’ house at Madrid an image representing St. Francis Borgia (which was afterwards removed to make way for an altarpiece in plastic).

The Count-Duke of Olivares ordered Camilo to produce a series of paintings of Kings of Spain for the theater of Buenretiro. The Count-Duke also chose Camilo to adorn the western gallery of the palace with 14 frescoes from Ovid's Metamorphoses. Primarily a painter of religious works, Camilo painted for the monasteries of Madrid, Toledo, Alcalá, and Segovia. He painted and draped some of the statuary of Manuel Pereyra.

== Works ==
- Scenes from Ovid's Metamorphoses (1641), Alcázar de Madrid, now destroyed
- San Juan de Dios (1650), Bowes Museum, Barnard Castle, Durham, England
- Saint Louis of France (1651), Sarasota Museum
- San Jerónimo azotado por los ángeles (1651), Museo del Prado, Madrid
- Martyr of Saint Bartholomew (1651), Museo del Prado
- Adoration of the Kings (Museo de Bellas Artes, Bilba)
- San Carlos Borromeo y los apestados, the New Cathedral of Salamanca
- San Pedro consagrando a San Torcuato, Hospital Tavera, Toledo
- San José con el Niño dormido, Huesca Museum
- Altarpiece of Santorcaz (Madrid) (1656)
- Altarpiece of Otero de Herreros (1659), Segovia
- Altarpiece of the Virgin of Fuencisla (1662), Segovia
- Conversion of Saint Paul, Provincial Museum, Segovia
- Muerte de San Pablo Ermitaño, Museo del Prado
- San Juan Bautista en orla de flores, private collection
- Asunción de la Virgen (1666), Hermitage Museum, Saint Petersburg
- Adoration of the Shepherds, Chazen Museum of Art, Madison, Wisconsin
- Statuary of Manuel Pereyra
- Ascension, (1651), Museu Nacional d´Art de Catalunya

== Bibliography ==
- García López, David (2008). Lázaro Díaz del Valle y las Vidas de pintores de España. Madrid, Fundación Universitaria Española., p. 310 ISBN 9788473927147.
- Palomino, Antonio, An account of the lives and works of the most eminent Spanish painters, sculptors and architects, 1724, first English translation, 1739, p. 83
- Palomino, Antonio (1988). El museo pictórico y escala óptica III. El parnaso español pintoresco laureado. Madrid, Aguilar S.A. de Ediciones., p. 323 ISBN 84-03-88005-7.
- Pérez Sánchez, Alonso E., Baroque Paintings in Spain, 1600–1750 (Pintura Barroca en España, 1600–1750). Ed. Cátedra, Madrid (2009), 5th ed., ISBN 978-84-376-0994-2
- Various authors, Prefiguración Del Museu Nacional D'Art de Catalunya, Ed. Museu Nacional d'Art de Catalunya (1992) ISBN 9788480430043
- Tabar Anitua, Fernando, "New attributions to Francisco Camilo and Francisco Herranz" ("Nuevas atribuciones a Francisco Camilo y Francisco Herranz, seguidor segoviano"), Spanish Arts Archive, Vol. 66, no. 263, 1993, p. 291–296.
