= Antonio L'Horfelin =

Spanish painter

Antonio L’Horfelin (1587–1660) was a Spanish painter. He was born at Zaragoza. He was the son of an obscure artist, named Pedro L'Horfelin, who sent him to Rome for improvement when he was very young. He painted a St. Joseph with two laterals, in the church of the Barefoot Augustines at Zaragoza.
