= Francisco del Plano =

Spanish painter

Francisco del Plano y García de la Cueva (1658 in Daroca – September 15, 1739 in Zaragoza) was a Spanish painter who was active in Navarra and the Basque Country.

== Biography ==
Francisco del Plano was descended from a family of painters and gilders of Daroca. Like his father, Ambrose of Plano, and his maternal grandfather, Juan Garcia de la Cueva, del Plano began as a gilder in the Guild of St. Luke. He spent his youth in Zaragoza.

Francisco del Plano created frescoes of the Battle of Clavijo in 1723 at the Santiago de Zaragoza church. Later on, he worked with Miguel Jerónimo Lorieri and painted canvasses at the San Agustín (Saint Augustine) Chapel at the Salvador de Zaragoza Cathedral. He also carried out other paintings and murals in the Seo de Zaragoza, Olite, Corella and Viana.
