= Felipe Gil de Mena =

Spanish painter

Felipe Gil de Mena (1603 Antigüedad, Palencia, Spain – 1673), was a Spanish baroque painter.

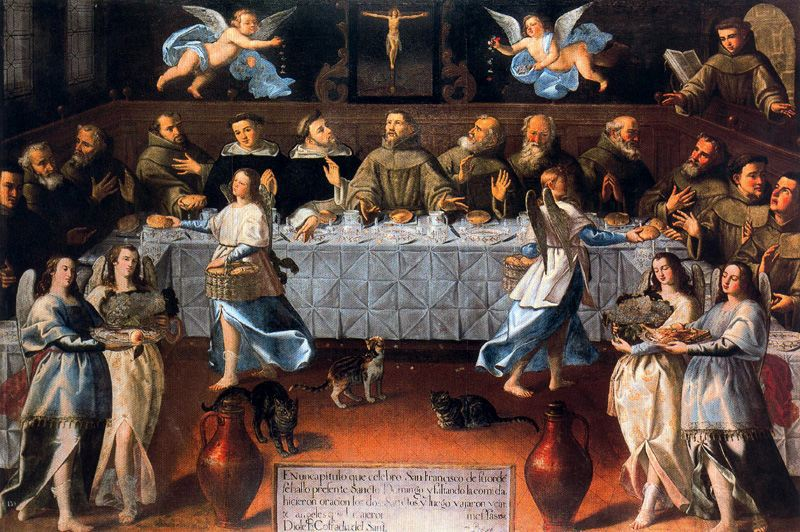
Saint Francisco and Saint Domingo in the refectory by Felipe Gil de Mena (second half of the 17th century)

== Biography ==
Gil de Mena was born in Antigüedad (Palencia). Around 1619 he moved to Valladolid where he became an apprentice of Diego Valentín Díaz (1586-1660), the most important artist in the city at that time. In his Lives, Palomino states that the artist went to the court in Madrid where he met Juan van der Hamen. Although this information seems no more than anecdotal, there is certainly an evident influence of Van der Hamen's work on Gil de Mena's paintings and it is known that his master owned various still lifes by that artist, with which Gil de Mena must have been familiar. His style has also been associated with the work of another Valladolid artist, Antonio de Pereda (1611-1678), although again there is no documentary proof of contact between them. In 1640 he received one of the most important commissions of his career, to decorate the cloister of the monastery of San Francisco in the city, for which he painted 32 works on the saint's life. Gil de Mena consequently became one of the most sought-after artists in the area, primarily painting for the religious communities. He combined this activity with the production of altarpieces for numerous churches in towns and villages in the area.
