= Josef Ramírez =

Spanish painter

Josef Ramírez (1624–1692) was a Spanish painter, active during the Baroque period in his native Valencia.

He was a pupil of Giacinto Gerónimo de Espinosa. He painted in the convent of San Felipe Neri at Valencia. He died in Valencia. He was a learned ecclesiastic, and wrote the Life of St. Philip Neri.
