= Francisco López Caro =

Spanish painter

Francisco López Caro (1578–1662) was a Spanish painter of the Baroque period. Born in Seville, he was a pupil of Juan de las Roelas. He painted with indifferent success in Seville until about 1660, when he went to Madrid where he spent the remainder of his life, and died in 1662. His works were mainly portraits, some of which are in private collections in Madrid, Salamanca, Granada, and Seville.

His son and pupil Francisco Caro (b. Seville in 1627; d. Madrid in 1667) was also a painter.
