= Jusepe Martínez =

Spanish painter

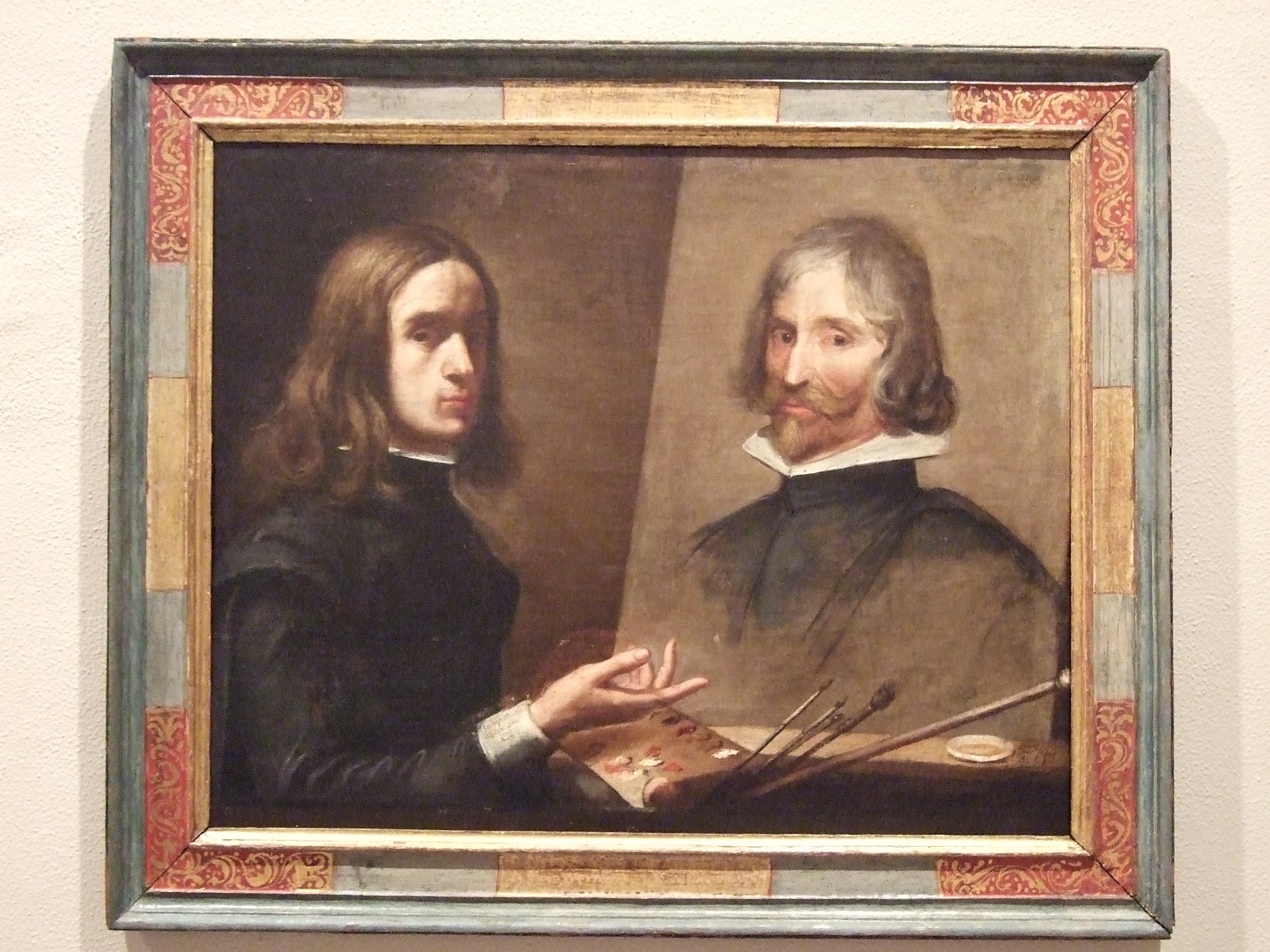
Self portrait painting with his father, Klaas de 2de , around 1630. Oil on canvas, 74 x 93.5 cm, Zaragoza Museum.

Jusepe Martínez Lurbe (1602 in Zaragoza – 1682) was a Spanish painter. He wrote a treatise Discursos practicables del noblisimo arte de la pintura (c.1675, not published until 1866).
