= Pablo Rabiella =

Spanish painter

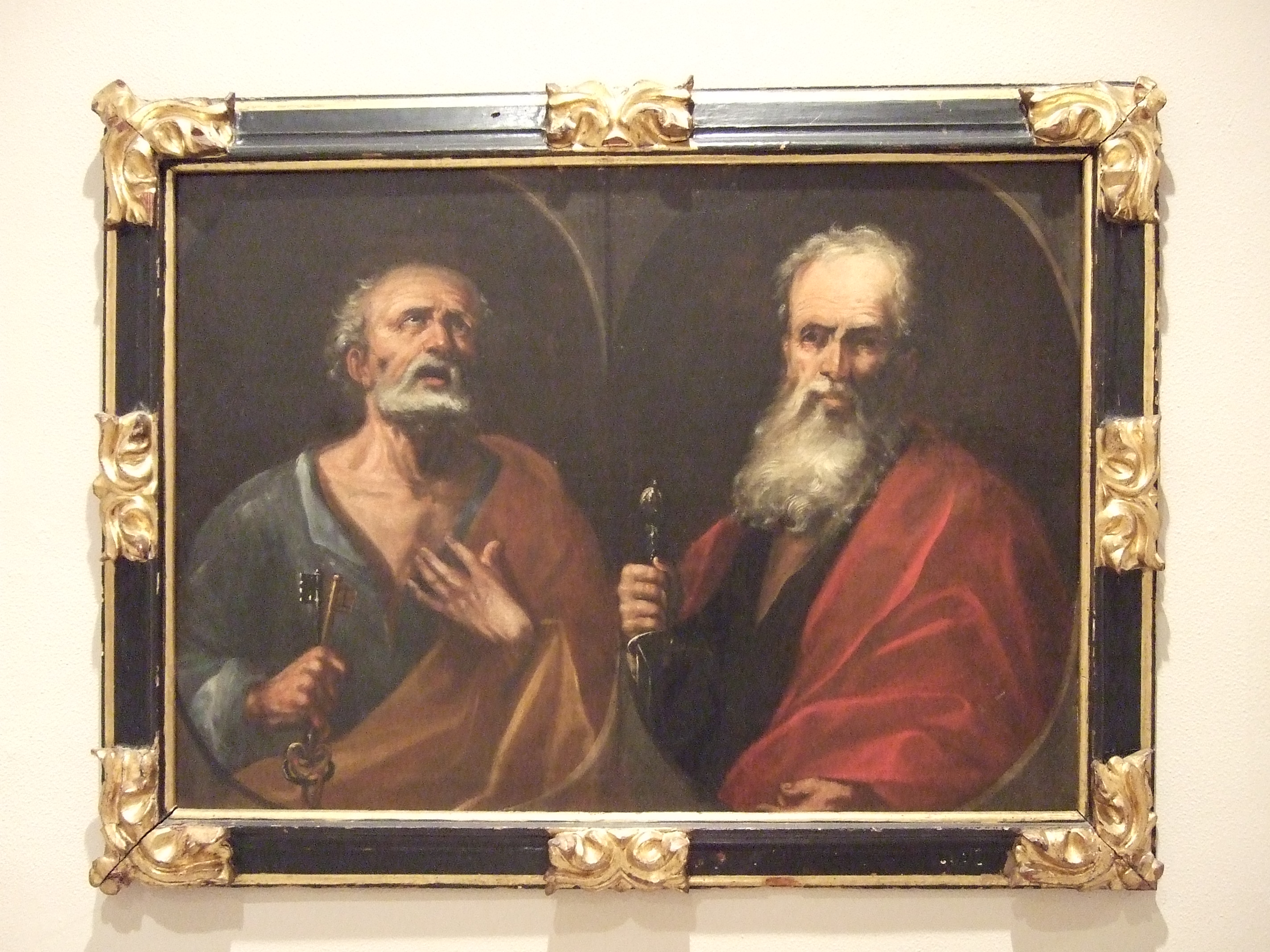
Saints Peter and Paul (Zaragoza Museum).

Pablo Rabiella y Díez de Aux (died 1719) was a Spanish painter of battle-pieces and portraits.

Díez de Aux lived at Zaragosa at the start of the 18th century. His brother Pablo Félix was also a painter.

Díez de Aux painted for the chapels of St. Marco and Santiago, and one in the Cathedral de la Seu at Zaragoza, representing the Battle of Clavijo (1696). His other paintings included the Martyr of Santiago and Saints Peter and Paul which is now at the Zaragoza Museum.

He died in Zaragoza, age unknown.
