= Antonio Fernández Arias =

Spanish painter

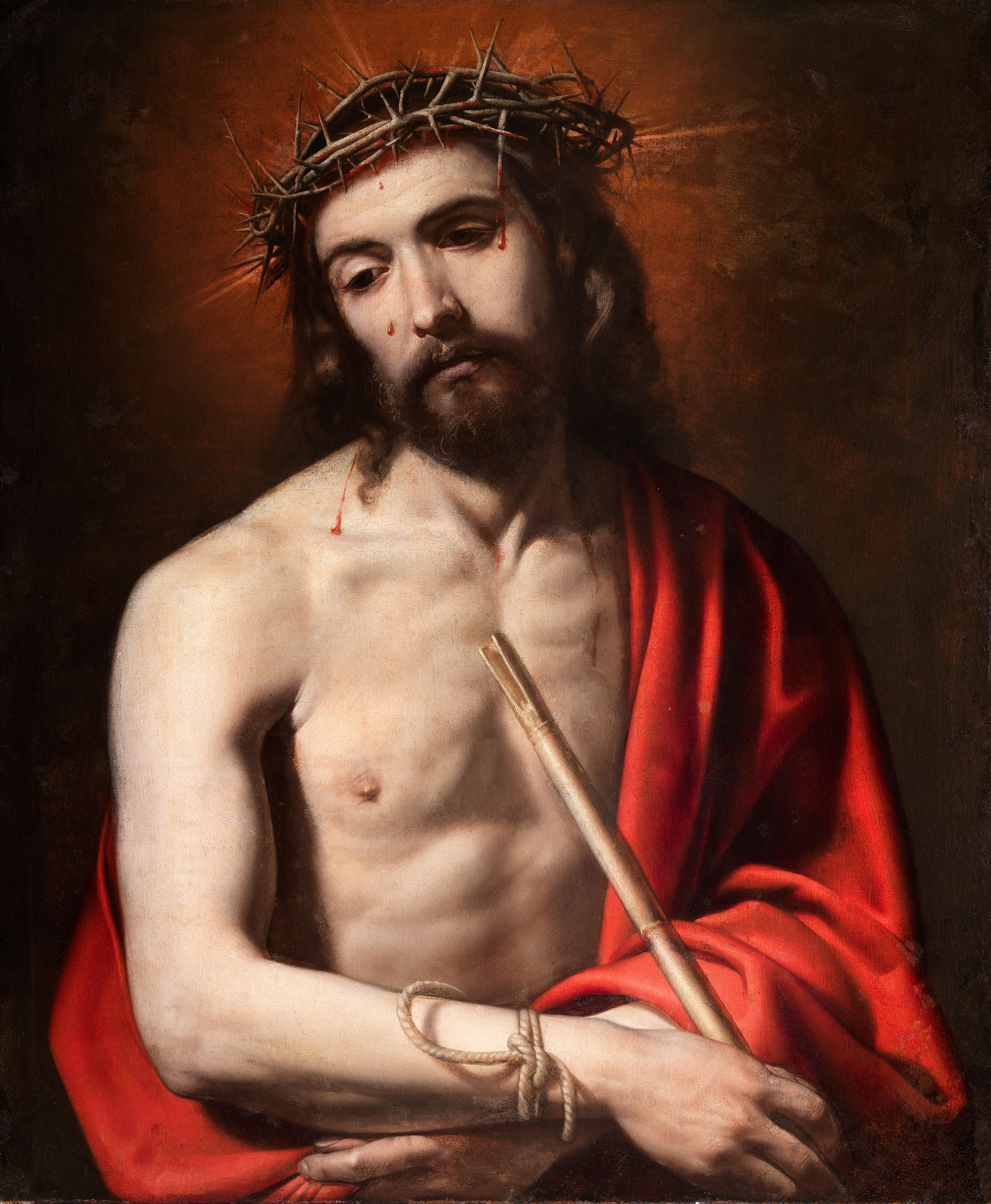
Ecce Homo (Behold the man)

Antonio Fernández Arias (around 1614 – 1684) was a Spanish painter of the Baroque period.

He was born in Madrid to a Galician father. He was a precocious pupil of Pedro de las Cuevas, and employed at the age of 11 years to assist in painting the main altar of chapel of Carmen Calzado de Toledo. By 22 years, he was one of the more prized painters in Madrid, employed by the Conde-Duque de Olivares along with Francisco Camilo and Alonso Cano to paint the portraits in the Hall of the Kings of the Royal Palace of Madrid. He never lacked commissions, he painted 11 paintings for the cloister of the convent of Augustines at San Felipe el Real, in which he represented among other topics, the Passion of Christ and the Baptism of Saint Cines. He painted Sts. Peter, Paul, John, and other saints for the order of Agonizantes de la calle de Fuencarral. Arias died poor in the general hospital of Madrid.

== Works ==
- Retablo de los carmelitas calzados, Toledo (1628, lost)
- Carlos V y Felipe II (Charles V and Philip II) (1639, University of Granada)
- La Virgen del Rosario (164.., Madrid, San Pascual)
- Cristo recogiendo sus vestiduras (1645, Convento de las Carboneras, Madrid)
- La moneda del César (1646, Museo del Prado)
- Virgen con el niño Jesús (c. 1655, Museo del Prado)
- San Agustín y Santa Mónica (Saints Augustine and Monica) (1656, Santa Isabel Monastery, Madrid)
- Camino del Calvario (Road to Calvary) (1657, Convento de San Pascual, Madrid), originally executed for the cloister of the Convent of San Felipe el Real in Madrid
- Lavatorio de los pies a los apóstoles (1657, Museo de Pontevedra).
- Virgen con Cristo muerto en los brazos y San Juan (1658, León, Carvajalas Monastery)
- San Antonio Abad (1675, lower part of the Convento de don Juan de Alarcón de Madrid).

== Gallery ==
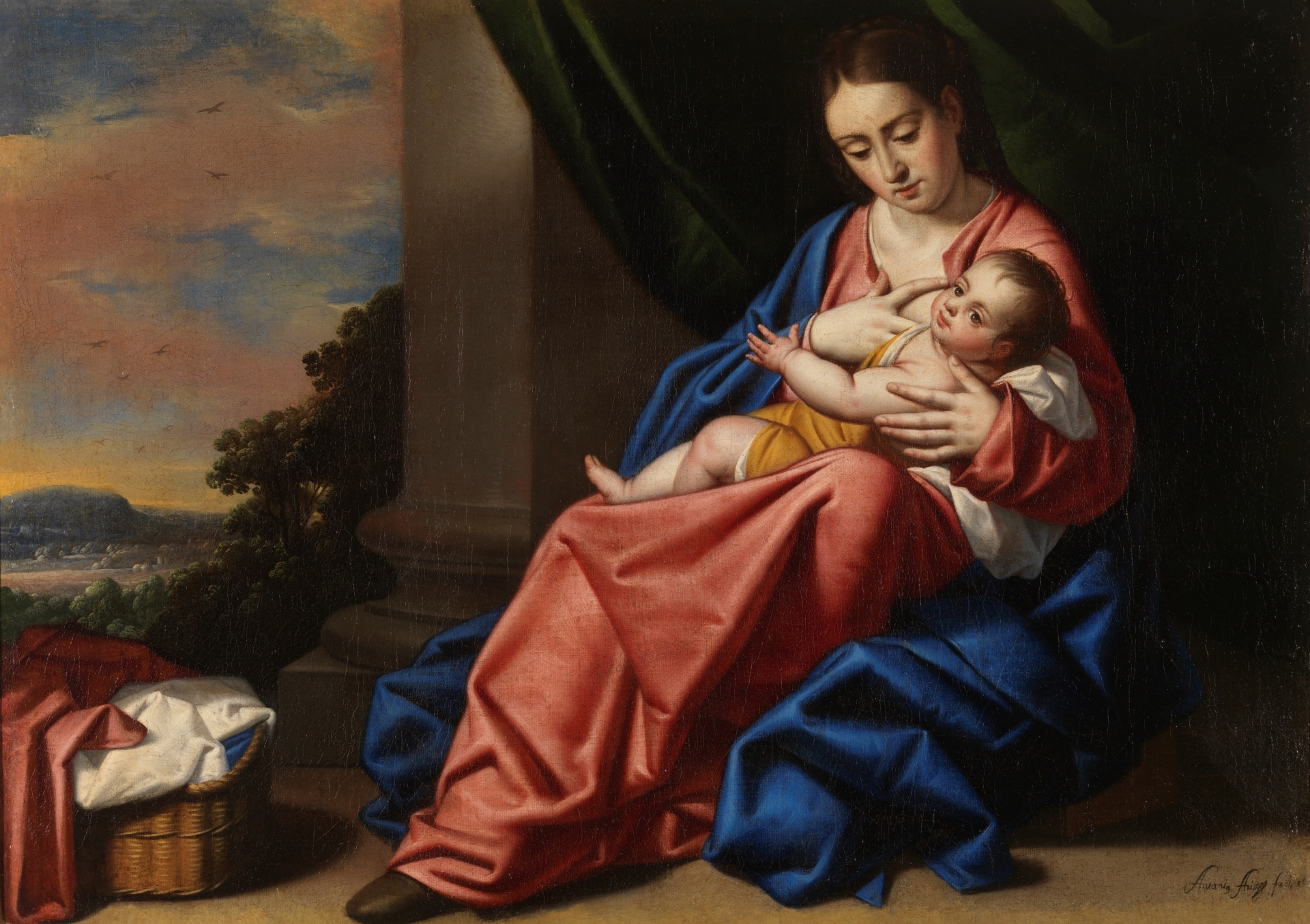
Virgin and Child Jesus

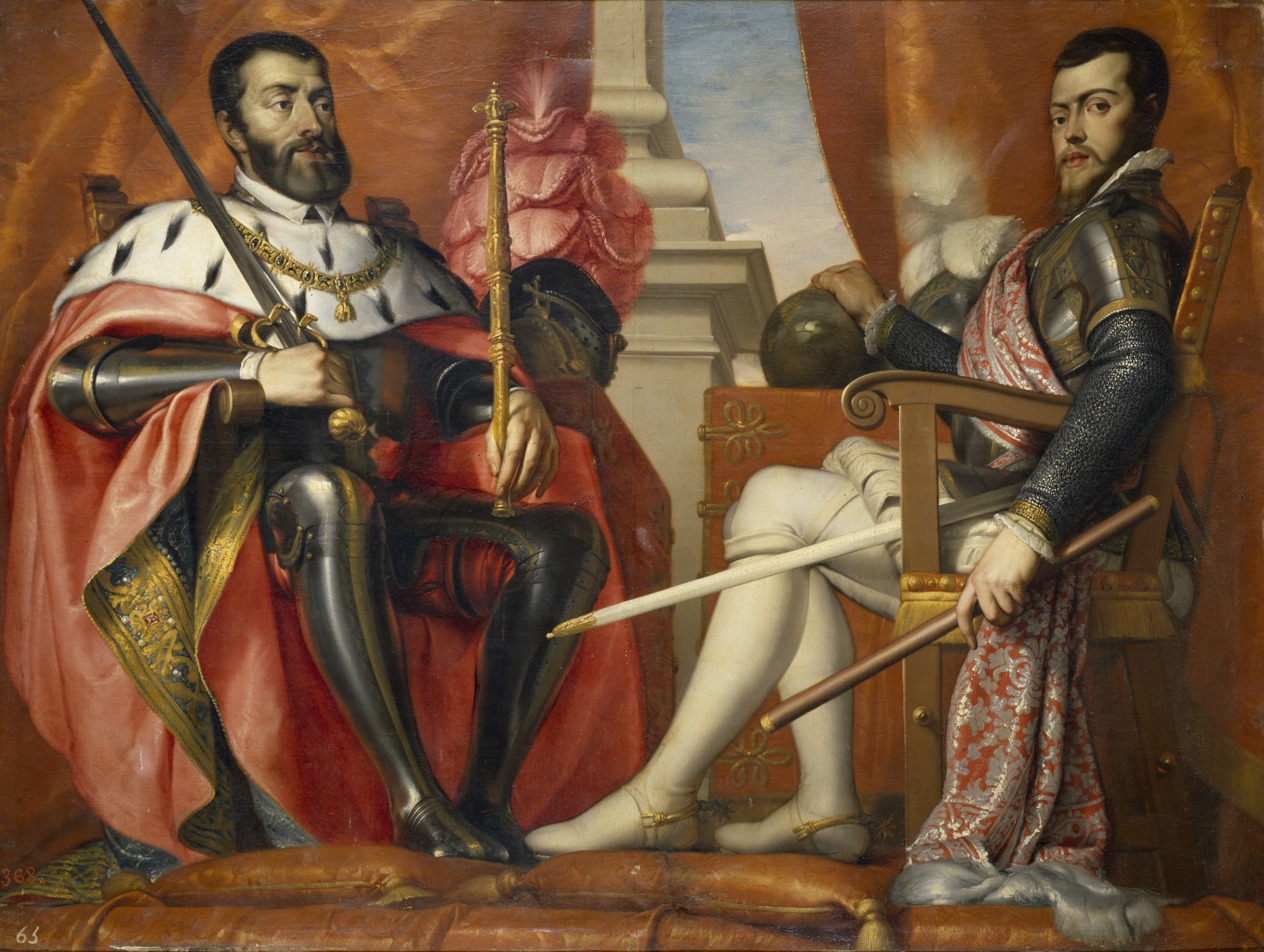
Charles V and Philip II

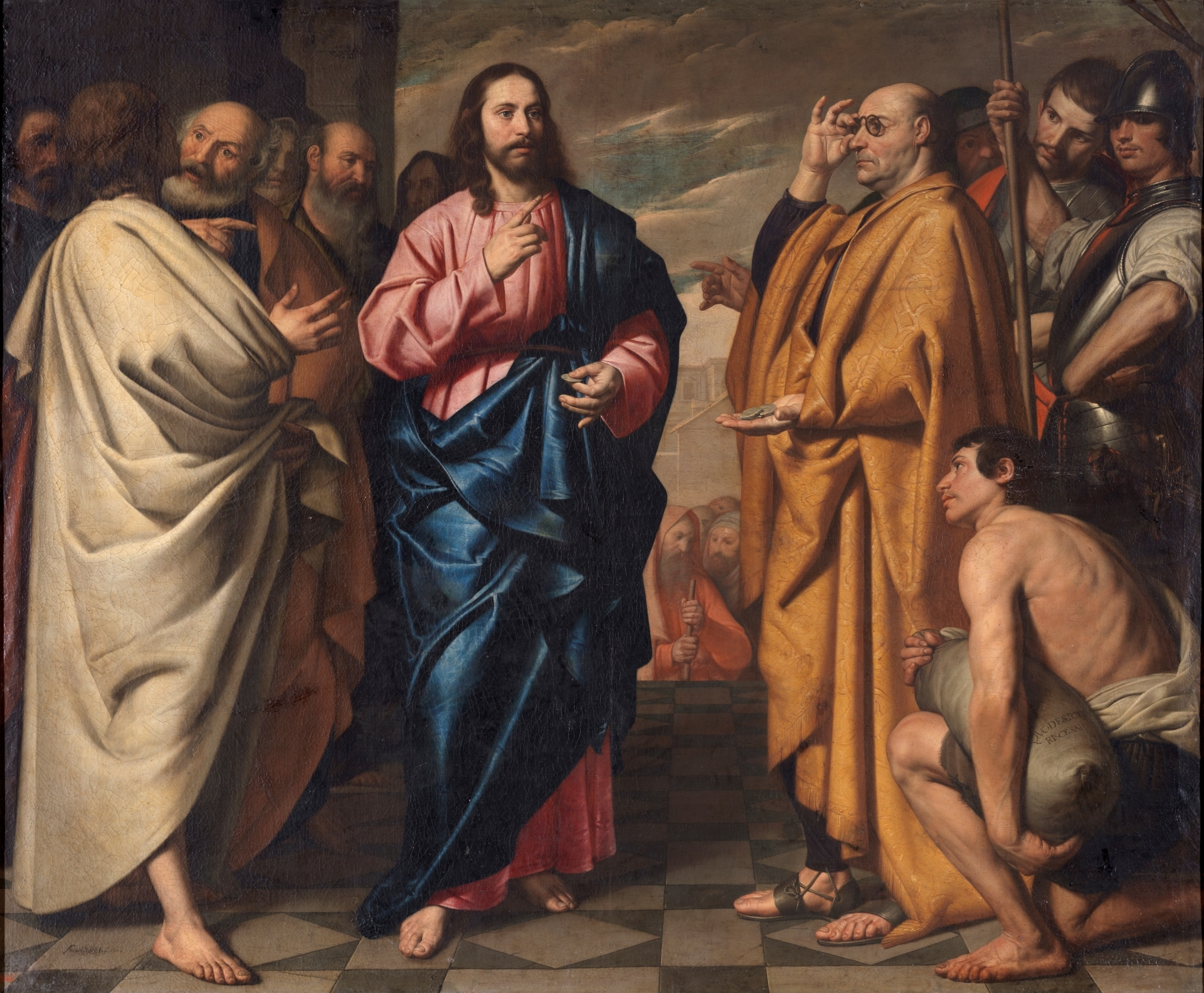
Caesar's coin, depicting Jesus Christ saying "Render to Caesar what is Caesar's and to God what is God's."

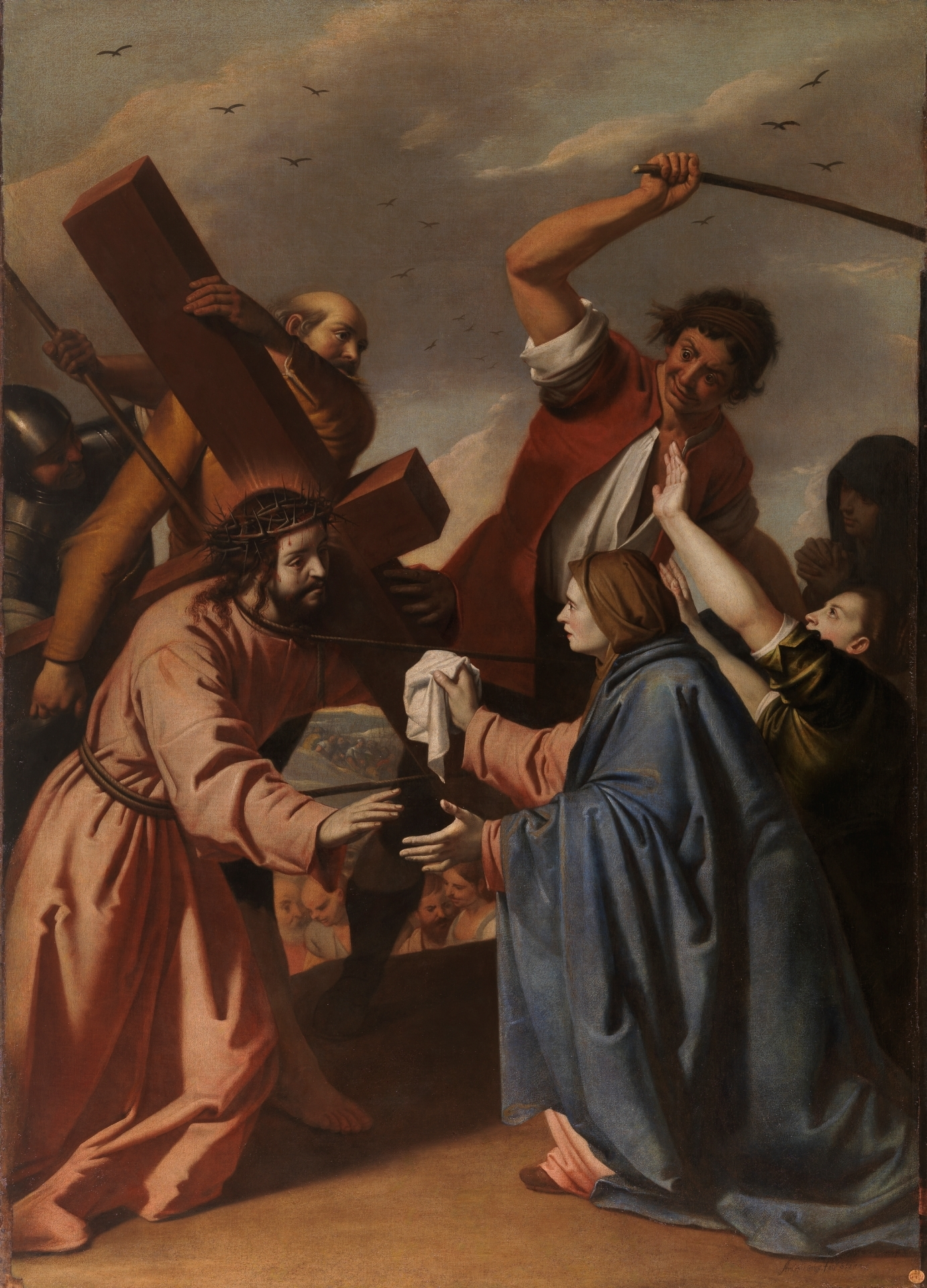
Veronica and the Carrying of Christ

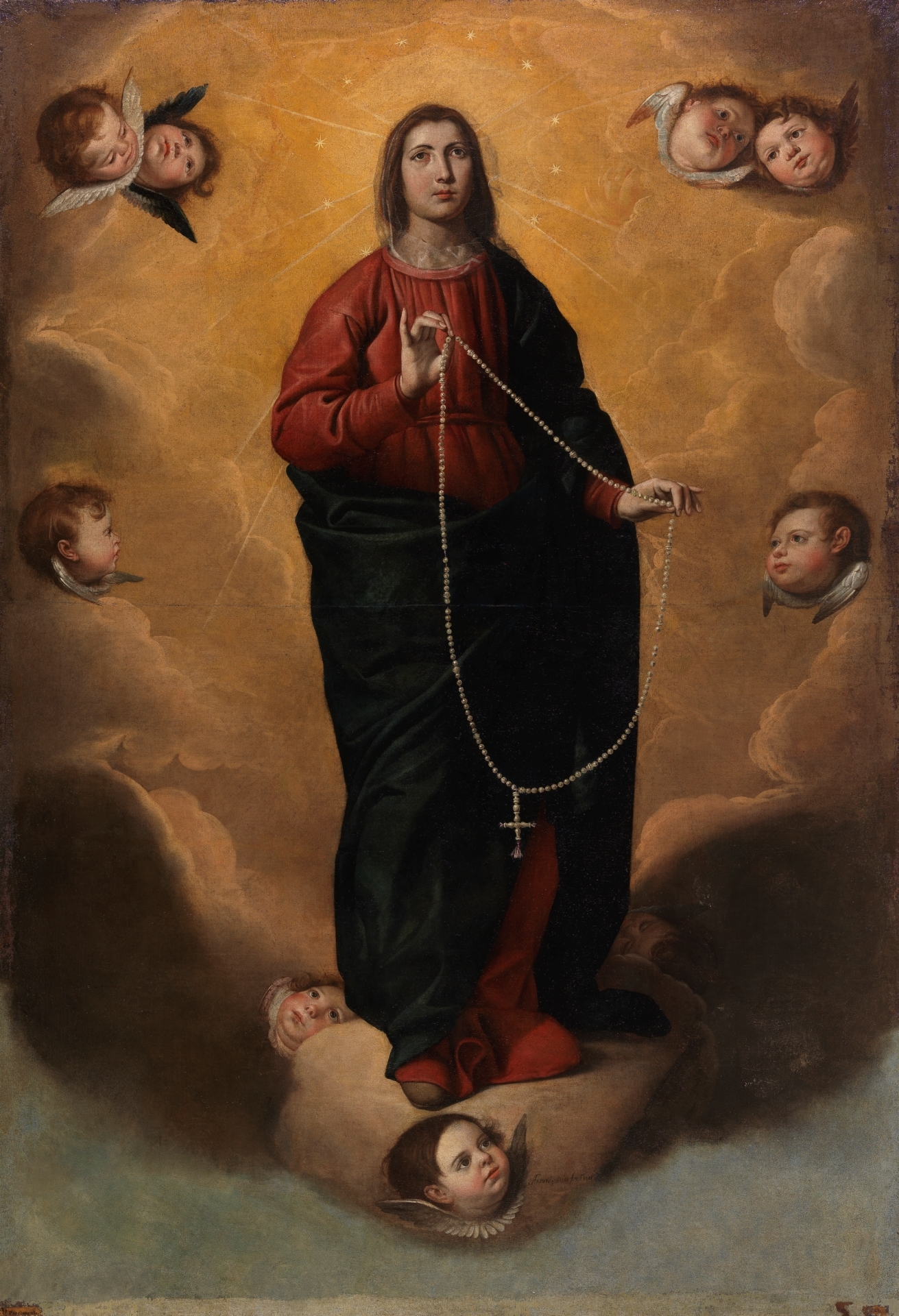
The Virgin of the Rosary, 1644

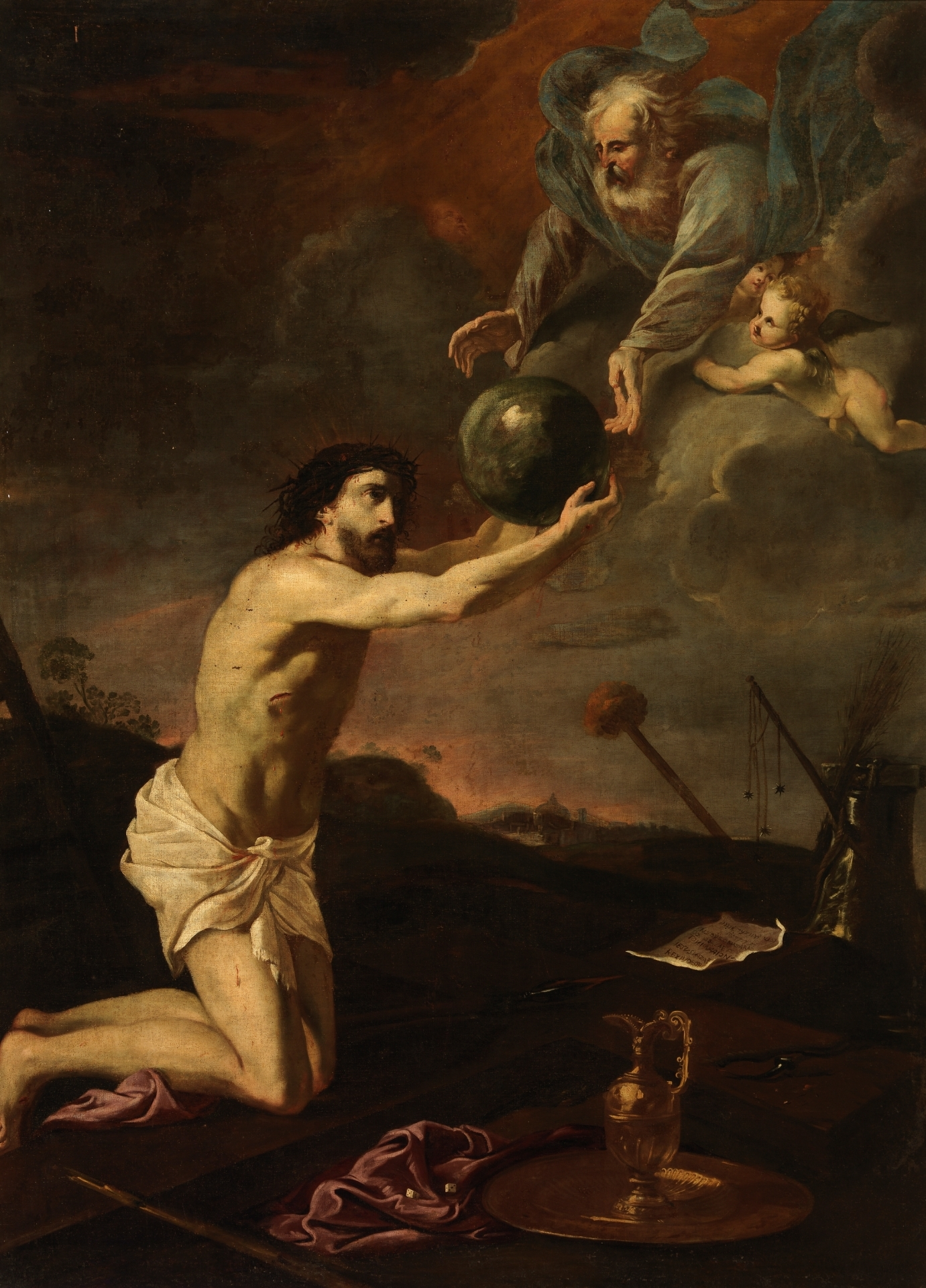
Jesus Christ receives the world from the hands of God the Father

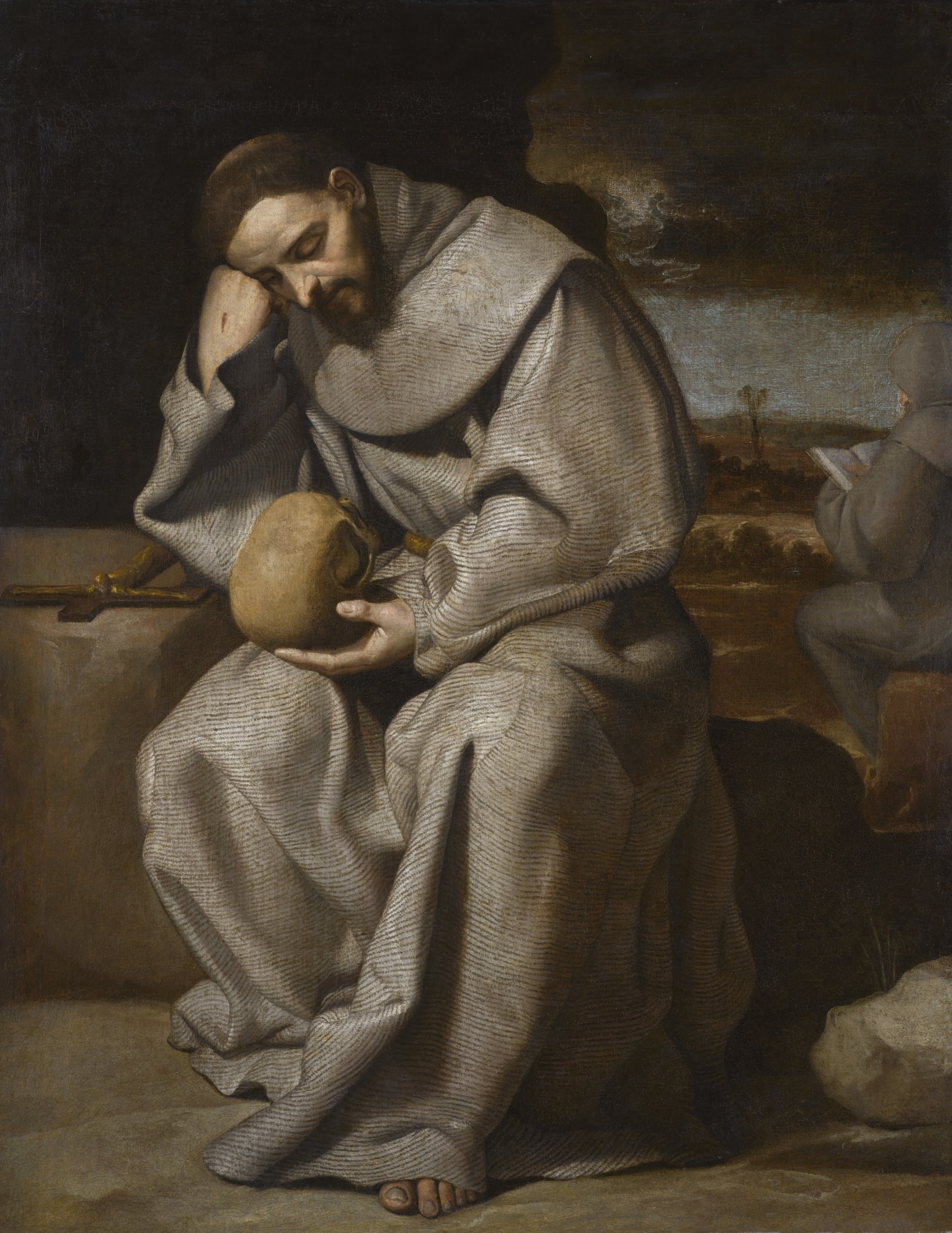
Saint Francis of Assisi
