= Giuseppe Romani =

Italian painter

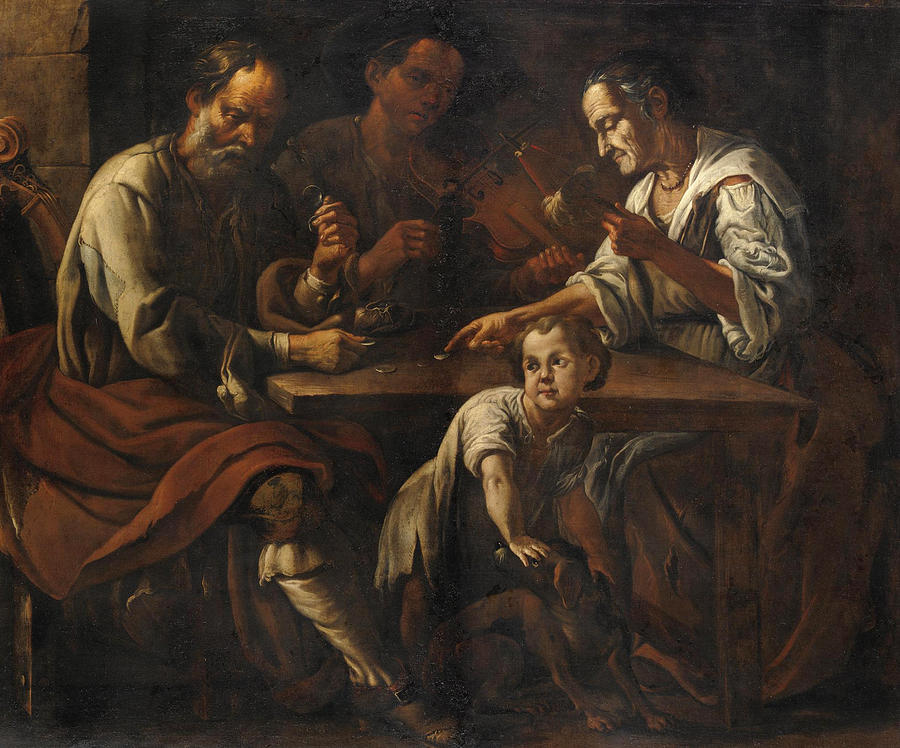
Giuseppe Romani's artwork

Giuseppe Romani (c. 1654/1657 – 1727) was an Italian painter of the Baroque era born in Como, Italy. Little is known of his life. Some of his paintings survive. He painted for churches in Modena between 1690 and 1722.
