= Gaspar de la Huerta =

Spanish painter (1645–1714)

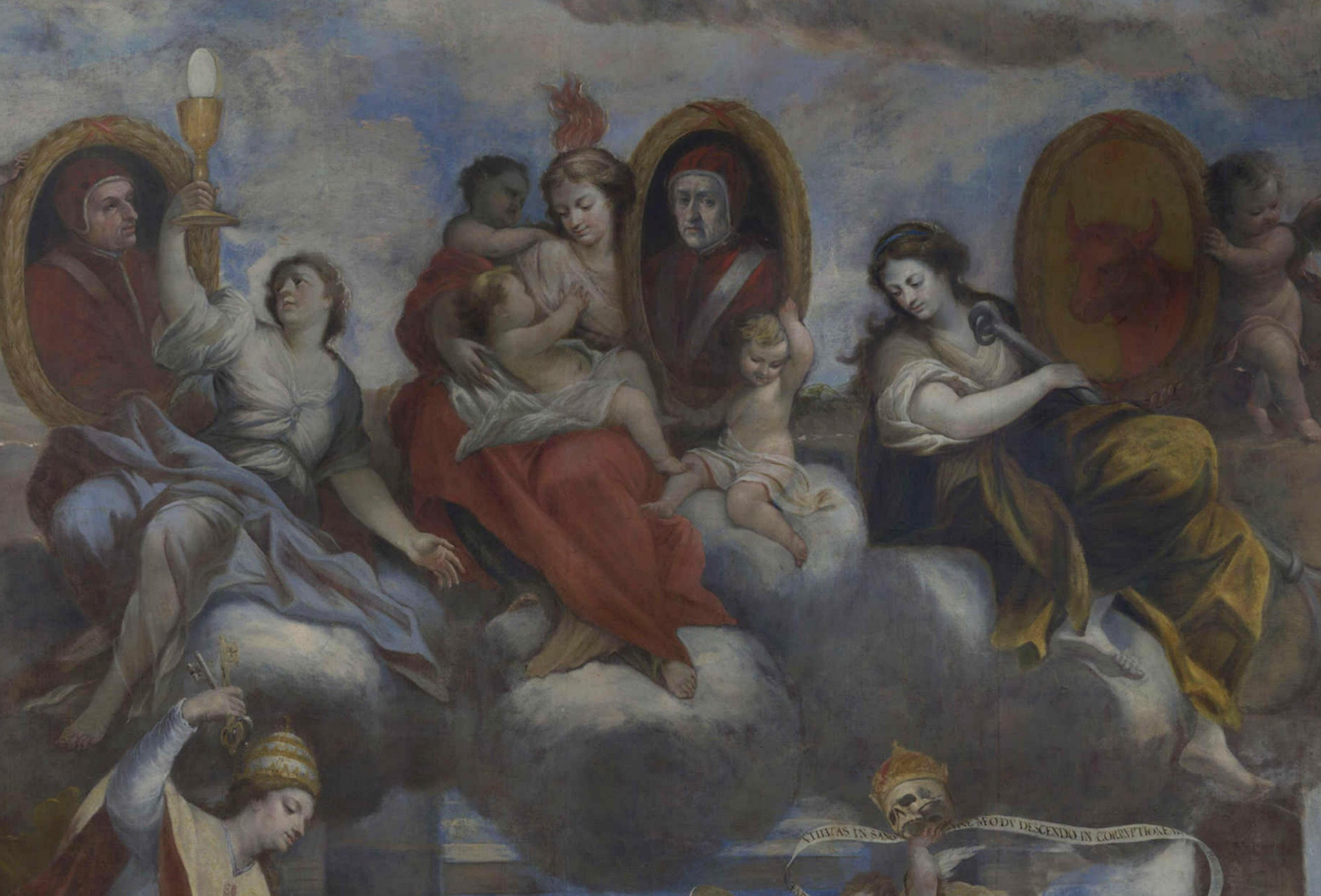
Theological Virgues, at the Golden Gallery at the Palacio Ducal de Gandía.

Gaspar de la Huerta (1645–1714) was a Spanish artist born at Campillo de Altobuey in Cuenca.

At an early age, seeking instruction in Valencia, he fell into the hands of Jesualda Sanchez, the bustling widow of Pedro Infant, a third-rate painter, who continued on her own account her husband's school for the manufacture of religious pictures. La Huerta, nevertheless, attained some skill as a draughtsman and colourist, and married the widow's well-dowered daughter. Working for moderate prices he found abundant employment in the neighboring churches and convents.

For the Franciscans he painted the Jubilee of the Porciuncula, and for the Dominicans the picture which long served as a veil to the wondrous image of Our Lady of the Forsaken. He died at Valencia in 1714. The Museum of Valencia possesses a picture of Christ and the Virgin enthroned, the latter with the bright complexion peculiar to Valencian beauty.
