= Juan de la Corte =

Spanish painter

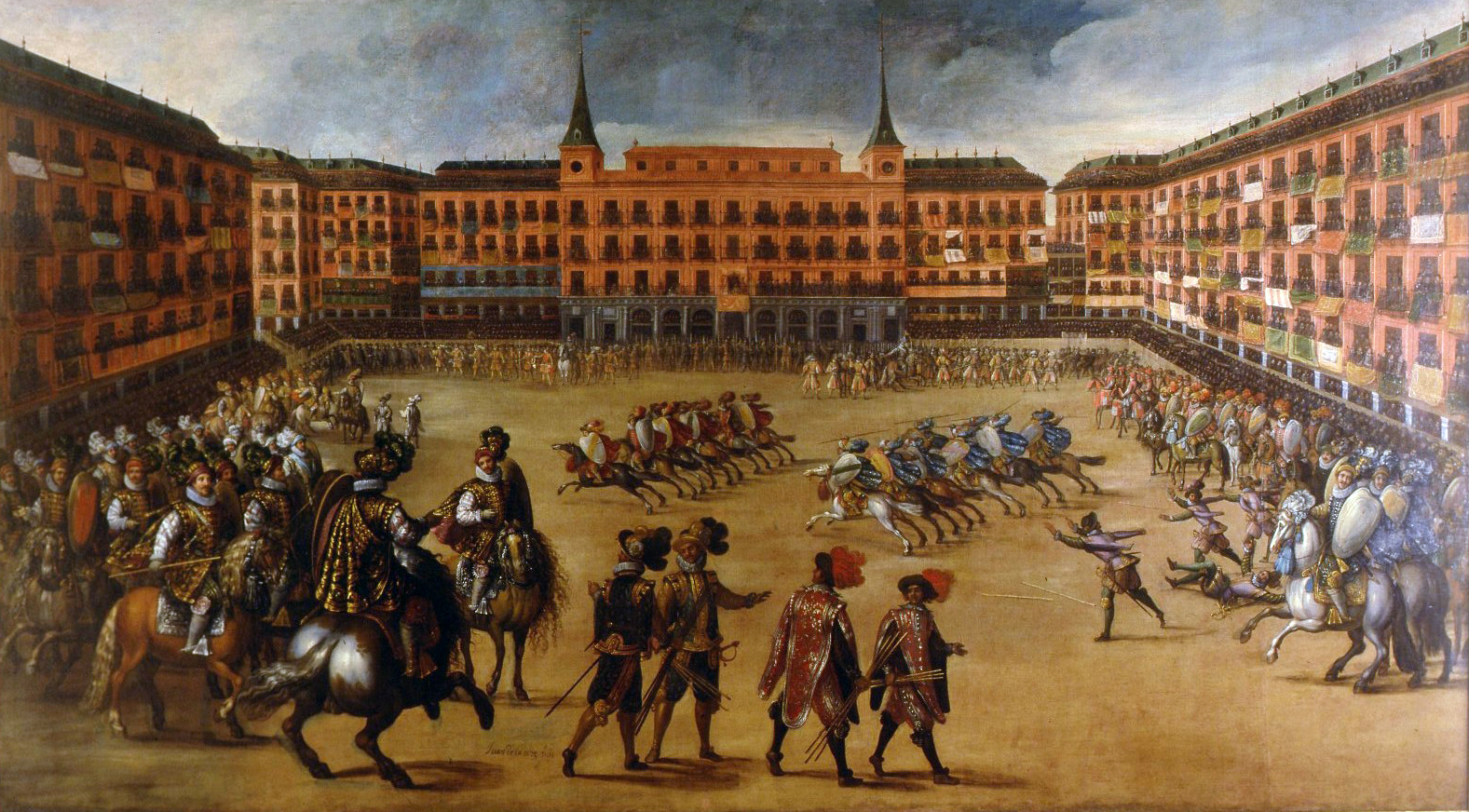
Feast at the Plaza Mayor, Madrid, now at the Museo Municipal, Madrid

Juan de la Corte, a Spanish painter of Flemish origin, who was born in Antwerp, Flanders in c. 1590. He was instructed by Velazquez, and painted portraits and history, but chiefly excelled in battle-pieces and perspective views. He also painted small pictures of subjects from sacred history. He was painter to King Phillip III, and was continued in that situation by his successor, King Philip IV. There are several of his pictures in the palace of Buen Retiro. He died at Madrid in 1660.

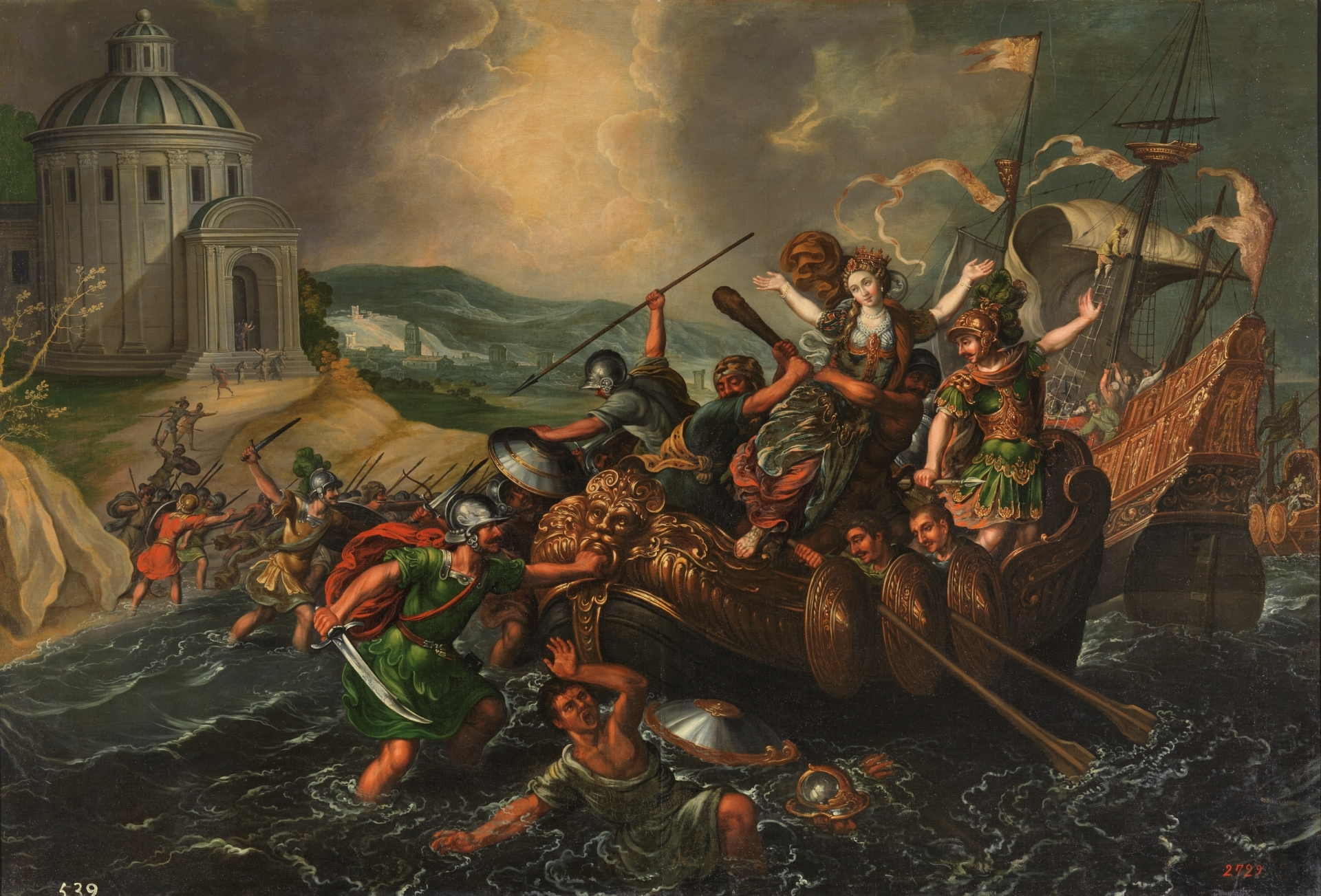
The Rape of Helen, now at the Museo del Prado, Madrid
