= Alonso Vázquez =

Spanish painter

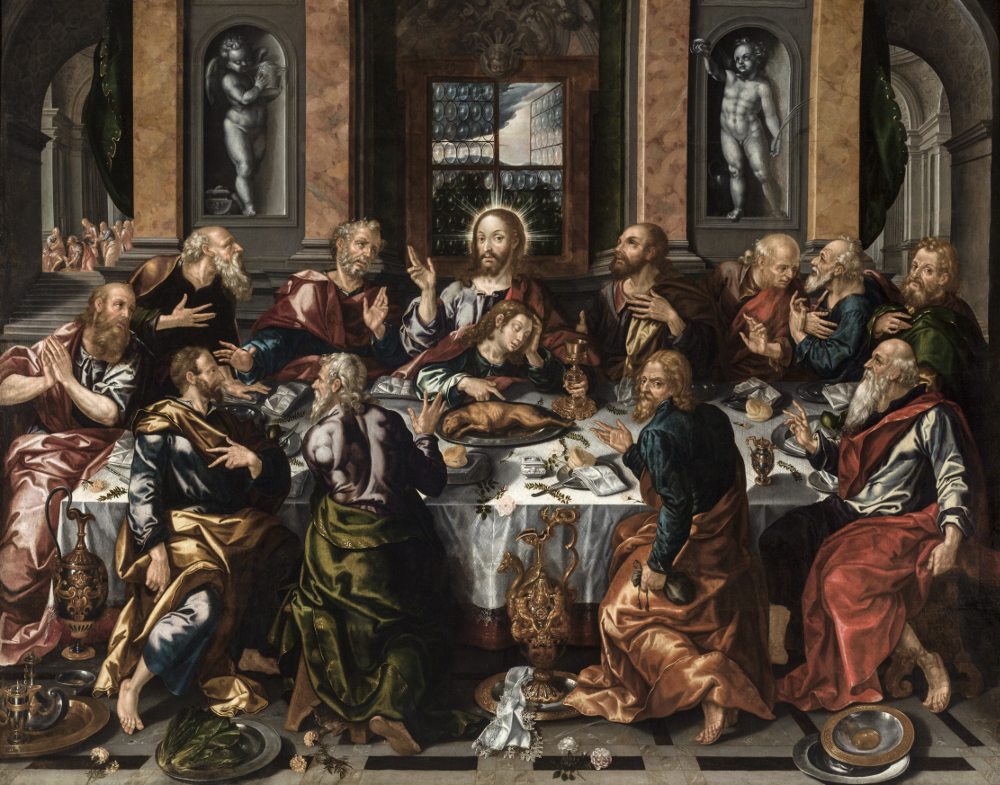
Sagrada cena

Alonso Vázquez (1565 – c. 1608) was a Spanish sculptor and painter of the Renaissance period.

Vázquez was born in Ronda, and learned painting in the school of Arfian at Seville. He passed through the usual apprenticeship "sargas" (inexpensive paintings on rough canvas) leading to frescoes and oils on wood panels. For the Cathedral and the convents of St. Francis and St. Paul, he painted a variety of works, no longer extant. He painted a series of canvases on the Life of St. Raymond, for the cloister of the friars of the Order of Mercy. He was also one of the artists chosen by the city of Seville to paint the great catafalque erected in the Cathedral at the time of public mourning for the death of Philip II.

Vázquez died either in Seville or in Mexico, probably about the middle of the reign of Philip III.
