= Vincent Cespedes =

French philosopher, writer and composer (born 1973)

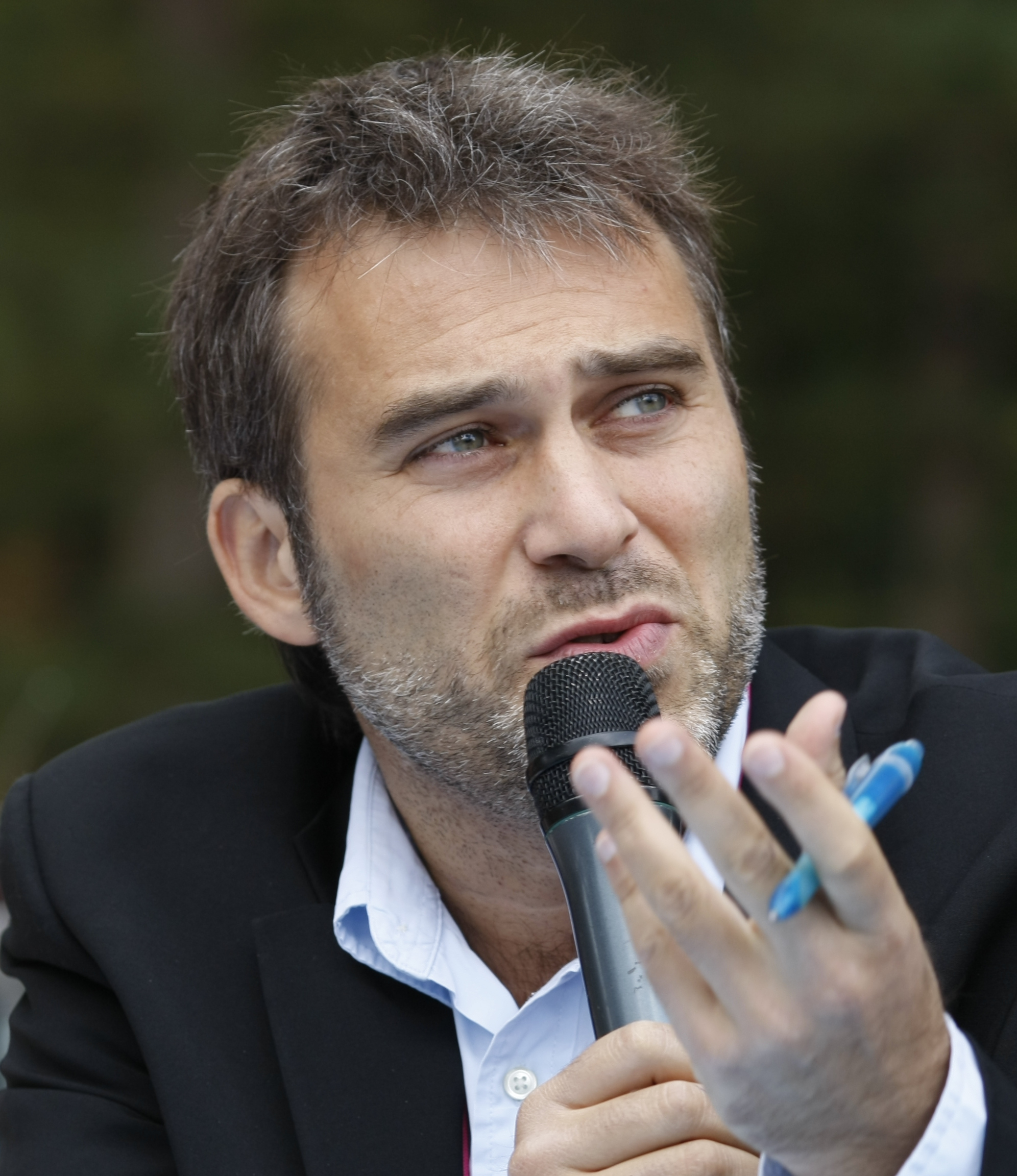
- Born: 14 September 1973; Aubervilliers, Seine-Saint-Denis
- Occupation: Philosopher

Vincent Cespedes (born 14 September 1973 in Aubervilliers, Seine-Saint-Denis) is a French philosopher, writer and composer.

He is the author of essays on various subjects, and he published a novel on Cheikh Anta Diop and Panafricanism philosophy, set in the context of relations between Africa and the West. Since 2008 he has directed a collection which he created at Larousse editions: "Philosopher" ("Philosophize"). He is also a painter, a pianist, a rapper and a composer.

== Works ==
Novel

- 2004: Maraboutés (Marabouted)
  (Fayard, Paris, 627 pages)

Essays

- 2001: I Loft You (Mille et Une Nuits, Paris, 129 pages) – the first French essay about reality television
- 2002: La Cerise sur le béton. Violences urbaines et libéralisme sauvage (The Cherry on the Concrete, Urban Violence and Savage Liberalism) (Flammarion, Paris, re-ed. 2005, 344 pages)
- 2002: Sinistrose. Pour une renaissance du politique (Sinistrose, For a Renaissance of the Political) (Flammarion, Paris, 192 pages) – with regard the French elections of 2002, which saw the extreme right pass through the first round
- 2003: Je t'aime. Une autre politique de l'amour (I Love You. A Different Politic of Love) (Flammarion, Paris, 490 pages)
- 2006: Mélangeons-nous. Enquête sur l'alchimie humaine (Let's mix. Investigating Human Alchemy) (Maren Sell, Paris, 363 pages)
- 2007: Mot pour mot. Kel ortograf pr 2m1 ? (Word for Word. Wat spelling 4 2moro ?)
  (Flammarion, Paris, 288 pages) – fictionalized dialogue on French spelling
- 2008: Mai 68, la philosophie est dans la rue ! (May 68, Philosophy is in the Street!)
  (Larousse, coll. " Philosopher ", Paris, 288 pages)
- 2010: Magique étude du Bonheur (Magic Study of Happiness)
  (Larousse, coll. " Philosopher ", Paris, 240 pages)
- 2010: L'Homme expliqué aux femmes (Men Explained to Women)
  (Flammarion, Paris, 254 pages)
- 2013: L'Ambition ou l'épopée de soi
  (Flammarion, Paris, 312 pages)
- 2015: Youth Now (Flammarion, Paris, 150 pages)
- 2021: Le Monde est flou. L'avenir des intelligences, "Hazy World. The future of intelligences", Plon, 2021, 280 pages.

Initiation

- 2006: Contre-Dico philosophique (Philosophical Counter-dictionary) (Milan, Paris, 288 pages)
- 2008: Tous philosophes ! 40 invitations à philosopher
  (All Philosophers! 40 Invitations to Philosophize)
  (Albin Michel, Paris, 176 pages)
- 2009: J'aime, donc je suis. À la découverte de votre philosophie amoureuse (I love, therefore I am. Discover Your Love Philosophy) (Larousse, Paris, 128 pages)

Diverse

- 1999: Concours de professeur des écoles. Dossiers d'entretien (Teaching examinations. Interviews)
  (Vuibert, re-ed. 2000, 320 pages)
- 2008 : La télé nous rend fous !, Flammarion.
- 2010 : Dictionnaire de la mort (″Dictionary of Death″), Larousse.
- 2011 : Le Jeu du Phénix (″The Phoenix Game″), a philosophical tarot.
- 2012 : Plages philo à l'usage de tous, Tallandier.
- 2014 : Vents contraires, " Aujourd'hui tous les élèves doivent être des philosophes »
- 2016 : Les mots (et les actes) pour vivre ensemble, Cherche Midi.
- 2016 : Éloge de l'érection, Le Bord de l'Eau.
- 2017 : Managers, dirigeants, libérez-vous ! Quand la transformation des dirigeants libère l'intelligence collective, Vuibert.
- 2017 : Sur les chemins de l'harmonie. Sagesse éternelle et regards contemporains, Larousse.

Discography

- 2010 : Slide (for contemporary dance show).
- 2012 : Hélices (for contemporary dance show).
- 2015 : Born As A Star (Сериал Рожденная Звездой), russian sitcom, 12 episodes.
- 2016 : Médée (original music for Heiner Müller's poece, Médée-matériau, directed by Rabiàa Tlili).
- 2016 : VIINCΞ, Ma Femme idéale, Recordless Company (single).
- 2017 : Art'n'Sex, Recordless Company (single).
- 2017 : Eternity (on an Arthur Rimbaud's poetry, translated in english), Recordless Company (single).
- 2017 : VIINCΞ, Microliberté (rap), Recordless Company(EP, 4 tracks).
- 2017 : À Bouche Que Veux-Tu, Recordless Company (for contemporary dance show).
- 2017 : L'Amour simple (for cello and piano), Recordless Company (single).

== Activities ==
He gives conferences in France and abroad, intervening notably in the circles of the hospital (clinical research ethics, psychiatry), of companies and institutions.

He is among "the young guard" in a ranking conducted by L'OBS on the "50 Stars of Thought", as well as among the nine portraits of "intellectuals of the twenty-first century" brushed by Le Journal du Dimanche.

Regular guest of the Solidays music festival organised by Solidarité sida (a French AIDS awareness group for youth), he participated in the launch of "Printemps Solidaire" at the Zénith Paris on 1 February 2017, in front of 6,000 spectators.

He had practiced Kung-Fu for 20 years and was stunt performer in Brotherhood of the Wolf (Christophe Gans, 2001), directed by Philip Kwok.

He is also a pianist and composer. His first rap EP, under the alias VIINCΞ, "Microliberté", was released on 13 October 2017 on Recordless Company record label.

=== Direct Philosophy ===
In 2016, he organizes about ten times a month video sessions on Facebook Live to interact directly with Internet users connected to the themes that they suggest; an exercise which he calls "balbutiement" (″stammering″).

It is also thanks to the exploration of this technology that he creates and animates the first role-playing game in Facebook live video, Primate Joke: a meditation on the future of humanity and modern democracies, where emotions and thought are taken care of by monkeys-cyborgs, the "Cymians".

With these experiences, he created "Dream Tanks" in August 2016: citizen agoravideos in which Internet users (called "Editors") seize a theme and interact with their "co-drivers" (users connected) . This initiative of "direct philosophy" will produce fifty Dream Tanks from the first month, by publishers from 17 to 73 years, from all origins and around the world (France, Peru, Thailand, China). In a year, the number of Dream Tanks will be 450.

=== TintinGate ===
On 19 September 2017, he made a Facebook post arguing that the character Tintin had always been perceived as a girl by his creator, Hergé. Though Cespedes indicated in the post that it was "fake news," some readers believed it, leading to a controversy he called "TintinGate". Cespedes later explained his intention to demonstrate how fake news could be parroted by mainstream media in an attempt to stay relevant in an age of online media.

=== New technologies ===
In 2016, he created the human values test Deepro (for ″Deep Profiling″), presenting his new axiology directly in the form of a mobile app.
His philosophical tarot, Le Jeu du Phénix (″The Phoenix Game″), is also adapted for mobile app.

In 2017, with his team of French and Vietnamese developers, he launches the IMLAC project (″Intelligent Matricial Language About Concepts″), the construction of a philosophical artificial intelligence, based on his system of formalization of human behaviors, on the Lovotic of Hooman Samani, on works by Lotfi Zadeh and on swarm intelligence.
