= Francisco Fernández (artist) =

Spanish painter (1606–1646)

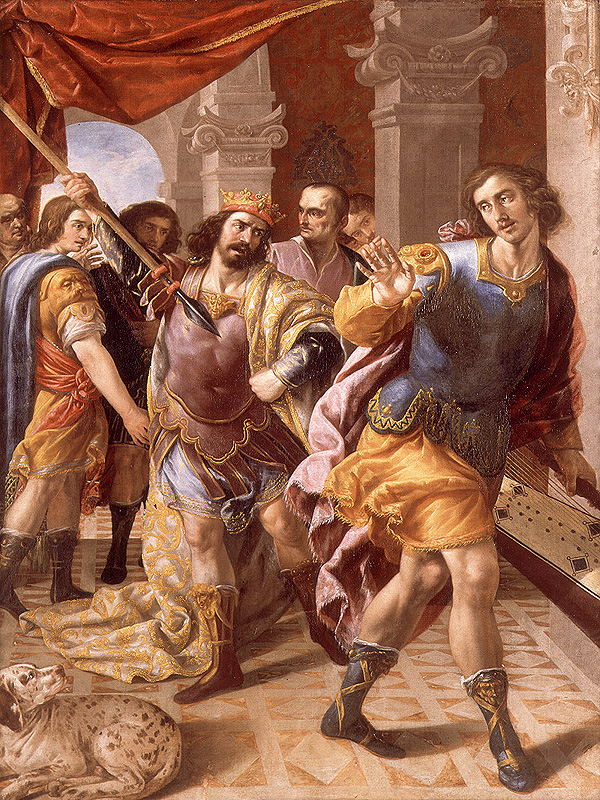
Saul and David, now in the Museu de Belles Arts de València

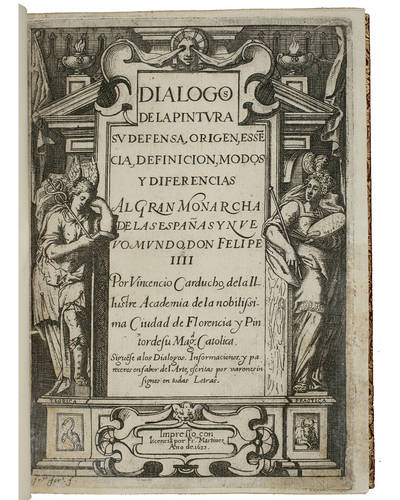
Titlepage of the Dialogos de la Pintura by Carducci, illustrated by Fernández

Francisco Fernández, (1606 in Madrid – 1646) who was brought up in the school of Vincenzo Carducho, was one of the most ingenious artists of his time, and his talent gained great reputation for him at an early age. He was employed by Philip IV in the palaces at Madrid, and in the convent of La Victoria are pictures by him of the Death of St. Francis of Paola, and St. Joachim and St. Anne. He also etched five spirited plates of allegories for Carducho's Dialogos de la Pintura, 1633. He was killed in a quarrel by Francisco de Baras.
