= Antonio Palomino =

Spanish painter

Acislo Antonio Palomino de Castro y Velasco
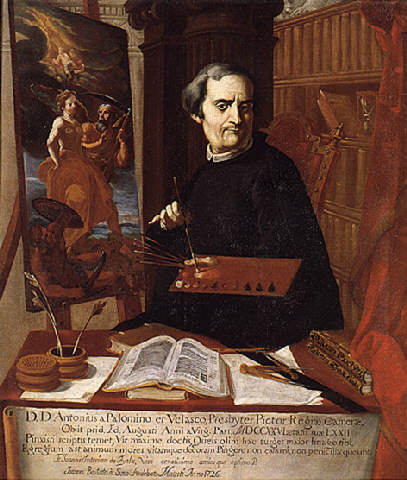
- Portrait of Antonio Palomino by Juan Bautista Simó
- Born: Acislo Antonio Palomino de Castro y Velasco; 1655; Bujalance, near Córdoba
- Died: 1726 (aged 70–71)
- Known for: Painting, writing on art
- Style: Baroque
- Patrons: King Charles II

Acislo Antonio Palomino de Castro y Velasco (1655 – 13 April 1726) was a Spanish painter of the Baroque period, and a writer on art, author of El Museo pictórico y escala óptica, which contains a large amount of important biographical material on Spanish artists.

== Life ==
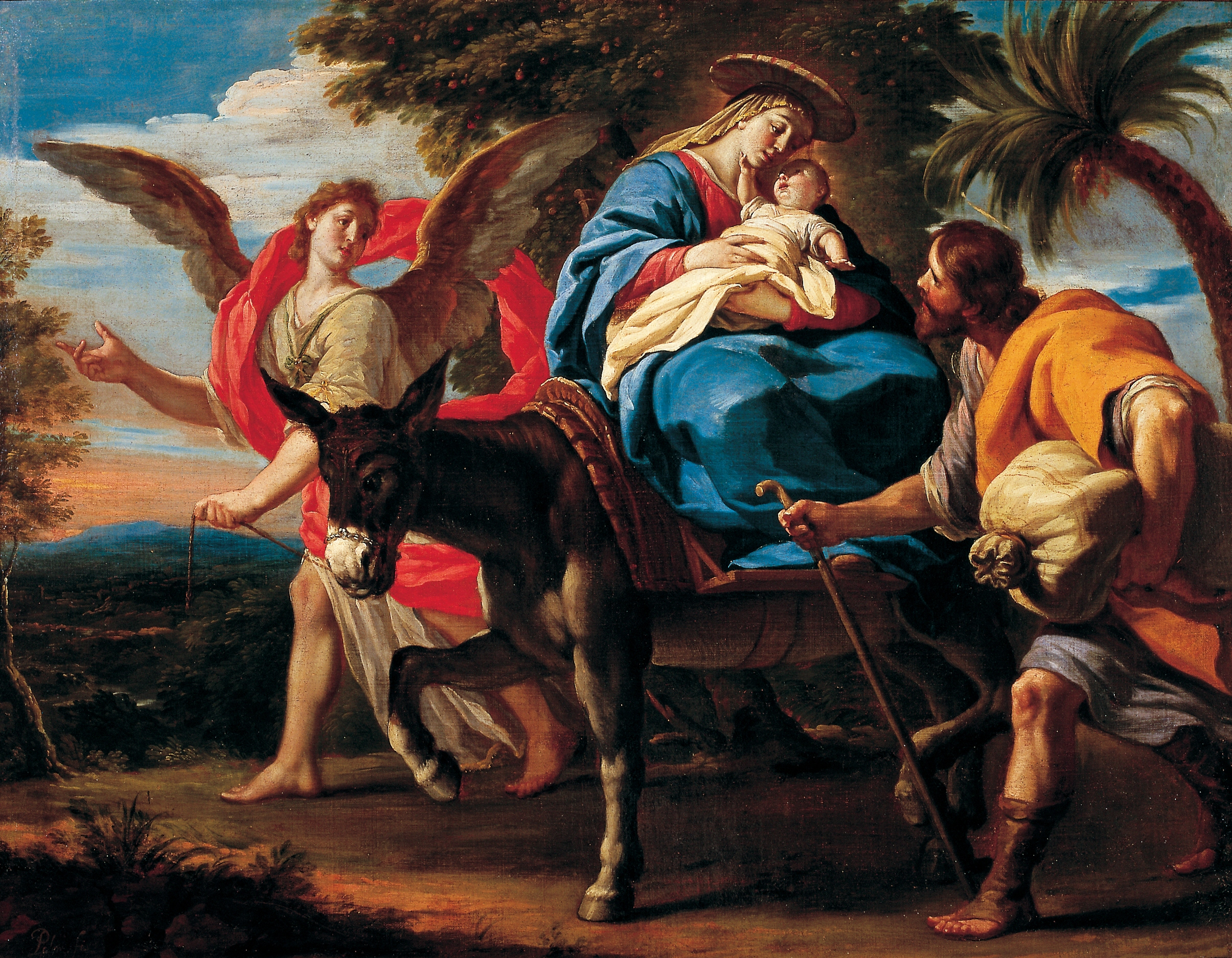
Huida a Egipto ca. 1712 - 1714.

Antonio Palomino was born to a respectable family at Bujalance, near Córdoba in 1655. He studied philosophy, theology and law at Córdoba, and had lessons in painting from Juan de Valdés Leal, who visited there in 1672, and afterwards from Juan de Alfaro y Gamez in 1675.

After taking minor orders Palomino moved to Madrid in 1678, where he associated with Alfaro, Claudio Coello, and Juan Carreño de Miranda, and executed some indifferent frescoes. He soon afterwards married a lady of rank, and, having been appointed alcalde of the mesta, was himself ennobled; in 1688 he was appointed painter to King Charles II.The artist visited Valencia in 1697 and remained there for three or four years, devoted to painting the ceilings of the Church of Santos Juanes and the Basilica of Our Lady of the Forsaken.

Between 1705 and 1715 he spent considerable amounts of time in Salamanca, Granada and Córdoba; in the latter year the first volume of his work on art, El Museo pictórico y escala óptica, appeared in Madrid. He painted the ceiling fresco in the dome of the sacristy of the Cartuja de Granada. After the death of his wife in 1725 Palomino took priest's orders. He died on 13 August 1726.

== El Museo pictórico y escala óptica ==
Palomino's El Museo pictórico y escala óptica first appeared in 1715–24 in a three-volume folio edition. The first two parts, on the theory and practice of the art of painting, have had little influence. The third, subtitled El Parnaso español pintoresco laureado, contains a large amount of important biographical material relating to Spanish artists, which, despite its uneven style, has led to the author being called "the Spanish Vasari".

It was partially translated into English in 1739 as An account of the lives and works of the most eminent Spanish painters, sculptors and architects; an abridgment of the original (Las Vidas de los pintores y estatuarios españoles) was published in London in 1742, and appeared in a French translation in 1749. A German version was published at Dresden in 1781, and a reprint of the entire work at Madrid in 1797. A modern English translation of the abridgment by Nina Ayala Mallory came out in 1987 from Cambridge University Press (ISBN 0-521-33474-8).
