= List of Spanish artists (born 1500–1800) =

This is a list of notable Spanish artists who were born in or after 1501 and in or before 1800.

For artists born before 1501, see List of Spanish artists (born 1300–1500). For artists born after 1800, see List of Spanish artists.

== Born 1501–1550 ==
- Cristóbal de Acevedo (1540–1585) Painter
- Miguel Barroso (1538–1590) Painter
- Gaspar Becerra (1520–1570) Painter
- Pedro de Bolduque (16th century) Sculptor
- Nicolás Borrás (1530–1610) Painter
- Pedro Campaña (1503–1580) Painter
- Luis de Carbajal (1534–1613) Painter
- Juan Bautista Castillo (1500–1579) Painter
- Pablo de Céspedes (1538–1608) Painter
- Alonso Sánchez Coello (1531–1588) Painter
- Juan Correa de Vivar (1510–1566) Painter
- Juan de Herrera (1530–1597) Architect
- Jorge Inglés (1544–1585) Painter
- Juan de Juni (1507–1577) Sculptor
- Juan de Juanes (1510–1579) Painter
- Luis de Morales (1510–1586) Painter
- Antonis Mor (1520–1586) Painter
- Giovanni Narducci (1526–1616) Painter
- Juan Fernández Navarrete (1526–1579) Painter and sculptor
- Diego de Pesquera (1540–1581) Sculptor
- Domenico Theotocopouli (1541–1614) Painter (El Greco)
- Luis de Vargas (1502–1568) Painter
- Pedro de Villegas Marmolejo 1520–1597) Painter
- Fernando Yáñez de la Almedina (1506–1526) Painter

== Born 1551–1600 ==
- Gregorio Bausá (1590–1676) Painter
- Miquel Bestard (1592–1633) Painter
- Antonio Bisquert (1596–1646) Painter
- Andrea López Caballero (1647-?) Painter
- Eugenio Caxés (1575–1634) Painter
- Patricio Caxés (?-1612) Painter
- Bartolome Carducho (1560–1608) Painter
- Vicente Carducho (1578–1638) Painter
- Abdón Castañeda (1580–1629) Painter
- Bartolomé de Cárdenas (1575–1628) Painter
- Agustín del Castillo (1565–1626) Painter
- Juan del Castillo (1584–1640) Painter
- Bartolomeo Cavarozzi (1590–1625) Painter
- Isabel Coello (?-1590) Painter
- Francisco de Comontes (?-1565) Painter
- Antonio de Contreras (1587–1654) Painter
- Francisco Collantes (1599–1656) Painter
- Juan Sánchez Cotán (1560–1627) Painter
- Giovanni Battista Crescenzi (1577–1635) Painter, Architect
- Juan Pantoja de la Cruz (1553–1608) Painter
- Pedro de las Cuevas (1568–1635) Painter
- Luis Tristán (1580–1624) Painter
- Antonio de Espinosa (1565–1630) Painter
- Jerónimo Rodriguez de Espinosa (1562–1630) Painter
- Juan de Espinosa (fl. 1628–1659) Painter, son of Juan Bautista de Espinosa (?)
- Juan Bautista de Espinosa (1590–1641) Painter
- Gregorio Fernández (1576–1636) Sculptor
- Bartolomé González y Serrano (1564–1627) Painter
- Felipe de Guevara (?-1560) Art historian, collector
- Juan van der Hamen (1596–1631) Painter
- Francisco Herrera the Elder (1590–1656) Painter
- Juan Fernández el Labrador (fl. 1629–1636) Painter
- Pablo Legote (1598–1671) Painter
- Agustín Leonardo (fl. 1620s) Painter
- Cristóbal Lloréns (fl. 1597) Painter
- Juan Bautista Mayno (1578–1649) Painter
- Antonio Mohedano (1561–1625) Painter
- Juan Martínez Montañés (1568–1649) Sculptor
- Angelo Nardi (1584–1660) Painter
- Pedro de Obregón (1597–1659) Painter
- Pedro Orrente (1580–1645) Painter
- Francisco Pacheco (1571–1654) Painter
- Juan de Peñalosa (1581–1636) Painter
- Andrea Ramirez (fl. 1555–1558) Painter, illuminator
- Vicente Requena the Elder (fl. 1590) Painter
- Francisco Ribalta (1565–1628) Painter
- Juan Ribalta (1597–1628) Painter
- Jusepe de Ribera (1591–1652) Painter
- Juan de las Roelas (1558–1625) Painter
- Juan Rizi (1595–1675) Painter
- Bartolomé Román (1587–1647) Painter
- Lazzaro Tavarone (1559–1631) Painter
- Luis Tristán (1586–1640) Painter
- Pedro Núñez del Valle (1597–1649) Painter
- Francisco Varela (c.1580–1656) Painter
- Cristóbal Vela (1598–1658) Painter
- Diego Velázquez (1599–1660) Painter
- Francisco de Zurbarán (1598–1664) Painter

== Born 1601–1650 ==
- Juan de Alfaro y Gomez (1640–1680) Painter
- Andrés Amaya (c. 1645 – 1704) Painter
- José Antolínez (1635–1675) Painter
- Francisco Antolínez (1644–1700) Painter
- Cristobal Ramirez de Arellano (1630–1644) Painter
- Juan de Arellano (1614–1676) Painter
- Francisco de Artiga (1650–1711) Painter
- Sebastián Herrera Barnuevo (1619–1671) Painter
- Pedro Atanasio Bocanegra (1638–1688) Painter
- Francisco de Burgos Mantilla (1612–1672) Painter
- Francisco Camilo (1610–1671) Painter
- Alonso Cano (1601–1667) Painter/Sculptor
- Francisco Caro (1627–1667) Painter
- Juan Carreño de Miranda (1614–1685) Painter
- Felix Castello (1602–1656) Painter
- Antonio del Castillo y Saavedra (1616–1668) Painter
- Gregorio Castaneda (?-1629) Painter
- Antonio Castrejon (1625–1690) Painter
- Mateo Cerezo (1635–1685) Painter
- Miguel Jerónimo de Cieza (1611–1685) Painter
- Antonio Vela Cobo (1629–1675) Painter, sculptor
- Claudio Coello (1642–1693) Painter
- Pedro de Campolargo (1605–1675) Painter and engraver
- Gabriel de la Corte (1648–1694) Painter
- Antonio de Puga (1602–1648) Painter
- Juan Antonio Escalante (1633–1670) Painter
- Juan Conchillos Falco (1641–1711) Painter
- Vicente Salvador Gómez (1637–1700) Painter
- Juan Simón Gutiérrez (1643–1718) Painter
- Francisco Herrera the Younger (1622–1685) Painter
- José de Ledesma (1630–1670) Painter
- Jusepe Leonardo (1601–1652) Painter
- Juan de Licalde (17th century) Painter
- Isaac Lievendal (17th century) Engraver
- Esteban March (1610–1668) Painter
- Ambrosio Martínez Bustos (1614–1672) Painter
- Juan Bautista Martínez del Mazo (1612–1667) Painter
- Andrés Marzo (fl. 17th century)
- Pedro de Mena (1628–1688) Sculptor
- Juan Carreño de Miranda (1614–1685) Painter
- Bartolomé Esteban Murillo (1617–1682) Painter
- Pedro Nuñez de Villavicencio (1640–1695) Painter
- Josefa de Óbidos (1630–1684) Painter
- Francisco Meneses Osorio (1640–1721) Painter
- Francisco de Palacios (1615–1650) Painter
- Juan de Pareja (1610–1670) Painter
- Antonio de Pereda (1611–1678) Painter
- Francisco de Reyna (fl. 1659) Painter
- Luisa Roldán (1650–1704) Sculptor
- Juan de Valdés Leal (1622–1690) Painter
- Francisco Vera Cabeza de Vaca (1637–1700) Painter
- Juan de Zurbarán (1620–1649) Painter

== Born 1651–1700 ==
- Teodoro Ardemans (c.1661–1726) Painter
- Isidoro Arredondo (1653–1702) Painter
- Mosen Vicente Bru (1682–1703) Painter
- José de Cieza (1656–1692) Painter
- Pablo González Velázquez (1664–1727) Sculptor
- Michel Ange Houasse (1675–1730) Painter
- Ignacio de León Salcedo (fl. 1655–1685) Painter
- Andres Leyto (fl. 1680s) Painter
- Francisco Llamas (fl. 1700) Painter
- Bernardo Germán de Llórente (1685–1759) Painter
- Juan de Loaysa y Giron (fl. 17th century) Painter
- Fernando Marquez Joya (?-1672) Painter
- Esteban Márquez de Velasco (1652–1696) Painter
- Juan Ramírez Mejandre (1680–1739) Sculptor
- Juan García de Miranda (1677–1749) Painter
- Nicolas García de Miranda (1698–1738) Painter
- Antonio Palomino (1653–1726) Painter
- Andrés Pérez (1660–1727) Painter
- Juan Bautista Ravanals (1678-?) Engraver
- Isidoro de Redondillo (fl. 1685) Painter
- Alonso Miguel de Tovar (1678–1758) Painter
- Clemente de Torres (1665–1730) Painter
- Lucas de Valdés (1661–1724) Painter

== Born 1701–1750 ==
- Francisco Bayeu y Subías (1734–1795) Painter
- Ramón Bayeu (1746–1793) Painter
- Andrés de la Calleja (1705–1785) Painter
- José Camarón Bonanat (1731–1803) Painter
- Antonio Carnicero (1748–1814) Painter
- José del Castillo (1737–1793) Painter
- Françoise Duparc (1726–1778) Painter
- Corrado Giaquinto (1703–1765) Painter
- Alejandro González Velázquez (1719–1772) Painter
- Antonio González Velázquez (1723–1793) Painter
- Luis González Velázquez (1715–1763) Painter
- Francisco Goya (1746–1828) Painter/Printmaker
- Joaquin Inza (1736–1811) Painter
- Cristóbal de León (?-1729) Painter
- Francisco Lopez y Palomino (fl. 18th century) Painter
- José Luzán (1710–1785) Painter
- Mariano Salvador Maella (1739–1819) Painter
- Luis Egidio Meléndez (1716–1780) Painter
- Luis Paret y Alcázar (1746–1799) Painter
- Pedro Pozo (early 18th century – c. 1810) Painter
- Lorenzo Quiros (1717–1789) Painter
- Benevides Juan Ramirez (fl. 18th century) Painter
- José de Ribera (1747–1787) Painter
- José Ramírez de Arellano (1705–1770) Sculptor/Architect
- Juan Ramírez de Arellano (1725–1782) Painter
- José Romeo (1701–1772) Painter
- Pedro de Uceda (?-1741) Painter
- Cristóbal Valero (?-1789) Painter

== Born 1751–1800 ==
- José Aparicio (1773–1838) Painter
- Francisco Agustín y Grande (1753–1800) Painter
- Valentín Carderera (1796–1880) Painter
- Zacarías González Velázquez (1763–1834) Painter
- Asensio Juliá (1760–1832) Painter
- José de Madrazo y Agudo (1781–1859) Painter
- Jerónimo Navases (1787–?) Painter
- José Felipe Parra (1780–1846) Painter
- Vicente López y Portaña (1772–1850) Painter
- Juan Antonio Ribera (1779–1860) Painter
- José Roma (1784–1847) Painter
- Joaquín Bernardo Rubert (1772–1817) Painter
- Rafael Tegeo (1798–1856) Painter
- Rafael Ximeno y Planes (1759–1825) Painter
- José Antonio Zapata (1763–1837) Painter
