= List of Spanish artists (born 1300–1500) =

This is a list of notable Spanish artists who were born in or after 1300 and in or before 1500.

For artists born after 1500, see List of Spanish artists (born 1500–1800). For later artists, see List of Spanish artists.

== Born 1350–1400 ==
- Lluís Borrassà (1350–1424), painter
- Bernardo Martorell (1400–1452), painter
- Blasco de Grañén (1400–1459), painter
- Luís Alimbrot (1400s–1460s), painter

== Born 1401–1450 ==
- Jacomart (c. 1410–1461), painter
- Jaume Huguet (1415–1492), painter
- Nicolás Francés (1424–1468), painter
- Luis Dalmau (1428–1461), painter
- Joan Reixach (1431–1486), painter
- Master of the Cypresses 1434, manuscript illuminator
- Bartolomé Bermejo (1440–1498), painter
- Fernando Gallego (1440–1507), painter
- Rodrigo de Osona (1440–1518), painter
- Antonio del Rincón (ca.1446–1500) Painter
- Paolo da San Leocadio (1447–1520), painter of Italian origins
- Pedro Sanchez, 15th century painter
- Pedro Berruguete (1450–1504), painter
- Lo Spagna (1450–1528), painter

== Born 1451–1500 ==
- Martín Bernat (1454–1497), painter
- Juan de Flandes (1460–1519), painter
- Pedro Romana (1460–1536), painter
- Francisco de Osona (1465–1514), painter
- Diego López (1465–1530), painter
- Gil de Siloé (1467–1505), sculptor/architect
- Juan de Borgoña (1470–1534), painter
- Vasco de la Zarza (1470–1524), sculptor
- Alejo Fernández (1475–1545), painter
- Vicente Masip (1475–1545), painter
- Fernando Yáñez de la Almedina (c. 1475 – after 1537), painter
- Felipe Vigarny (1480–1542), sculptor
- Master of the Retablo of the Reyes Catolicos (1485–1500), painter
- Alonso Berruguete 1488–1561, painter/sculptor
- Pedro Machuca (1490–1550), painter
- Diego de Siloé (1495–1563), sculptor/architect
- Juan Vicente Masip (1500–1579), painter
