= Romulo Cincinato =

Italian painter

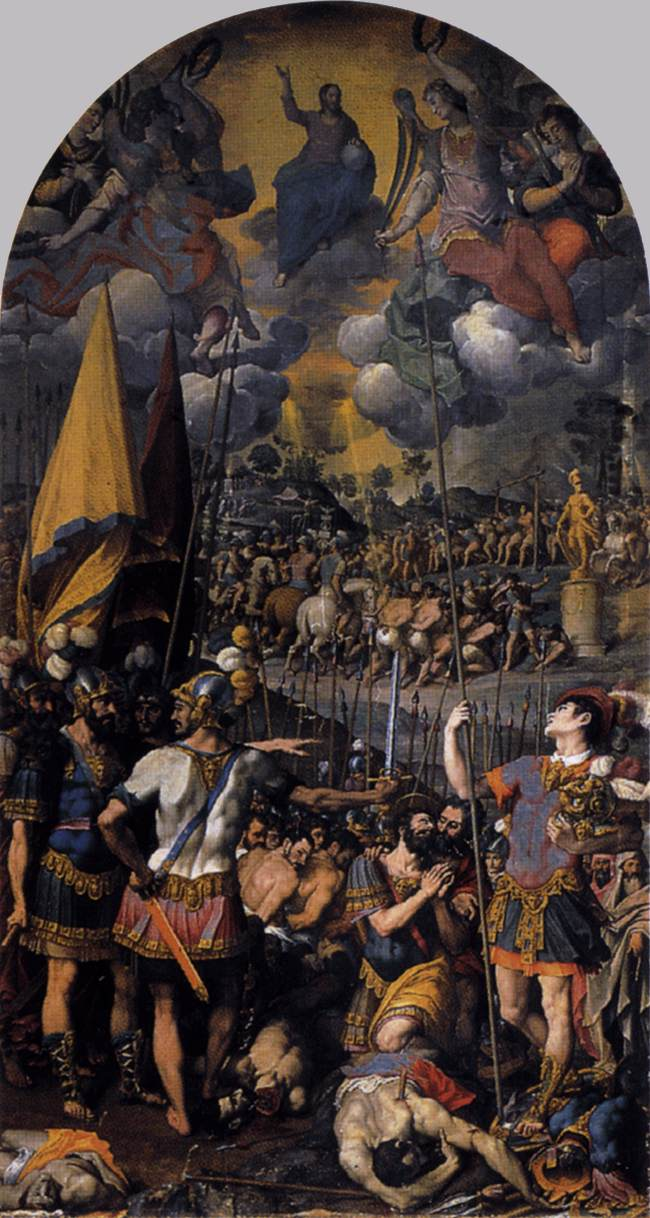
Romulo Cincinato, The Martyrdom of St Maurice, 1583, Oil on canvas, 540 x 288 cm, Monasterio de San Lorenzo, El Escorial, Spain

Romulo Cincinato or Cincinnato (1502 – c. 1593) was an Italian painter of the Renaissance period, active in Spain after 1567. His two sons, Diego and Francisco Romulo, were painters in Spain.

== Biography ==
Born in Florence, he was recruited by the Spanish Ambassador to the Holy See in Rome, and commended to Philip II, king of Spain. An altar-piece representing the Circumcision in the Jesuits' Church at Cuenca was his master-piece. He was accompanied by Patricio Caxes of Arezzo, who painted much in the Pardo. Cincinato also painted for the Escorial.
