= Isidoro de Redondillo =

Spanish painter

- Born: 17th century
- Died: 17th century
- Citizenship: Spanish
- Education: Angelo Nardi
- Known for: Portraits; historical pictures
- Movement: Baroque
- Patron: Carlos II of Spain

Isidoro de Redondillo was a Spanish painter of the 17th century and the Baroque period. He was a pupil of Angelo Nardi. He practiced at Madrid, and was appointed painter to Carlos II, King of Spain in 1685. He painted portraits and historical pictures.

== See also ==
- Isidoro Arredondo
