= Andrea Ramírez =

Andrea Ramírez may refer to:

- Andrea Ramírez (cyclist) (born 1999), Mexican racing cyclist
- Andrea Ramírez (taekwondo) (born 1998), Colombian taekwondo practitioner
- Andrea Ramírez Limón (born 1992), Mexican marathon runner
- Andrea Ramirez (painter), 16th-century Spanish painter
