= Francisco de Palacios =

Spanish painter

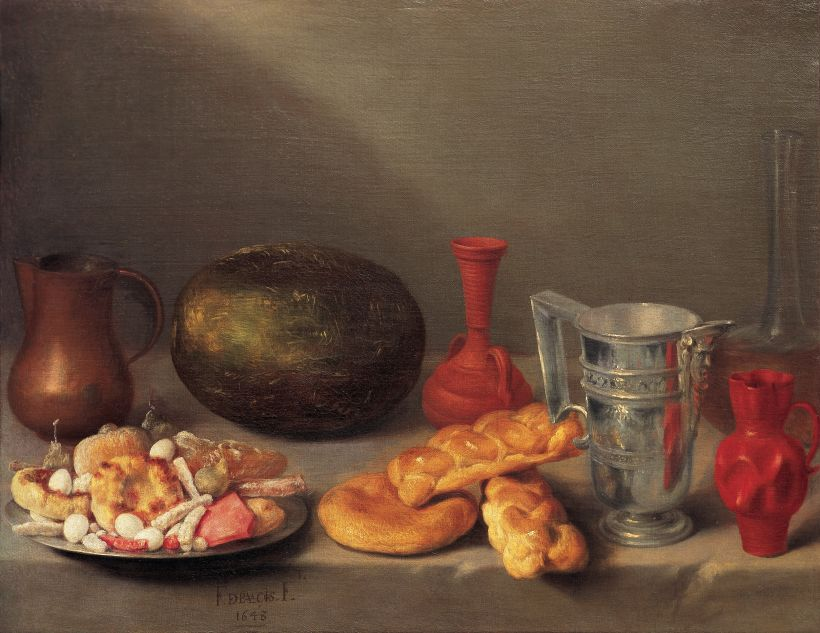
Still Life with Bread by Francisco de Palacios, Graf Harrach Family Collection, Art Gallery, 1648

Francisco de Palacios, also Francisco Palacios, (1623-January 1652), was a Spanish Baroque painter.

== Biography ==
De Palacios was initially known through only two small still lifes, acquired in Madrid in late seventeenth century by Count Ferdinand Harrach Buenaventura, published by August L. Mayer in 1922, and two paintings of San Onofre and San Francisco de Asis in the convent Calatravas Moralzarzal (Madrid). When the paintings were first seen, Buenaventura saw the influence of Antonio Ponz, and thought maybe the author was El Greco, so he was surprised when he recognized the signing of Palacios. Palacios was therefore primarily understood to be a still life painter until later research revealed he had done portraits and landscapes as well.

In January 1646 he married Josefa Berges, daughter of painter and paint merchant Francisco Berges, stating in the contract they were both older than twenty. The couple had two children, and in December 1651, being seriously ill, gave testament, ordering six hundred Masses with other demands, including one for the canonization of St. Maria de la Cabeza, indicating a good financial standard of living. He died in Madrid in January 1652, having fixed his residence on the street of Alcala. Both in the will as at the auction of the estate of his father, who died in 1672, there are interesting news about the paintings of various palaces, covering all genres. Along with some unspecified paintings for Nicholas Jacobs, are cited in the will a portrait of Doña Teresa, wife of Joseph Ferriol official of the secretariat of the Indies, and landscape in any number you did to Juan Pastrana, of those still was owed certain amounts. In addition, to Jerome Gonzalez Bricianos, cashier Manuel Lopez de Salcedo made a large picture of the Virgin and St. Joseph and the Infant Jesus and Eternal Glory to the Father. Also cited by Palacios were three "Orchard stained by natural", another still life of "a table with some peaches and olives and clay", and "a landscape and a Crowning with thorns".

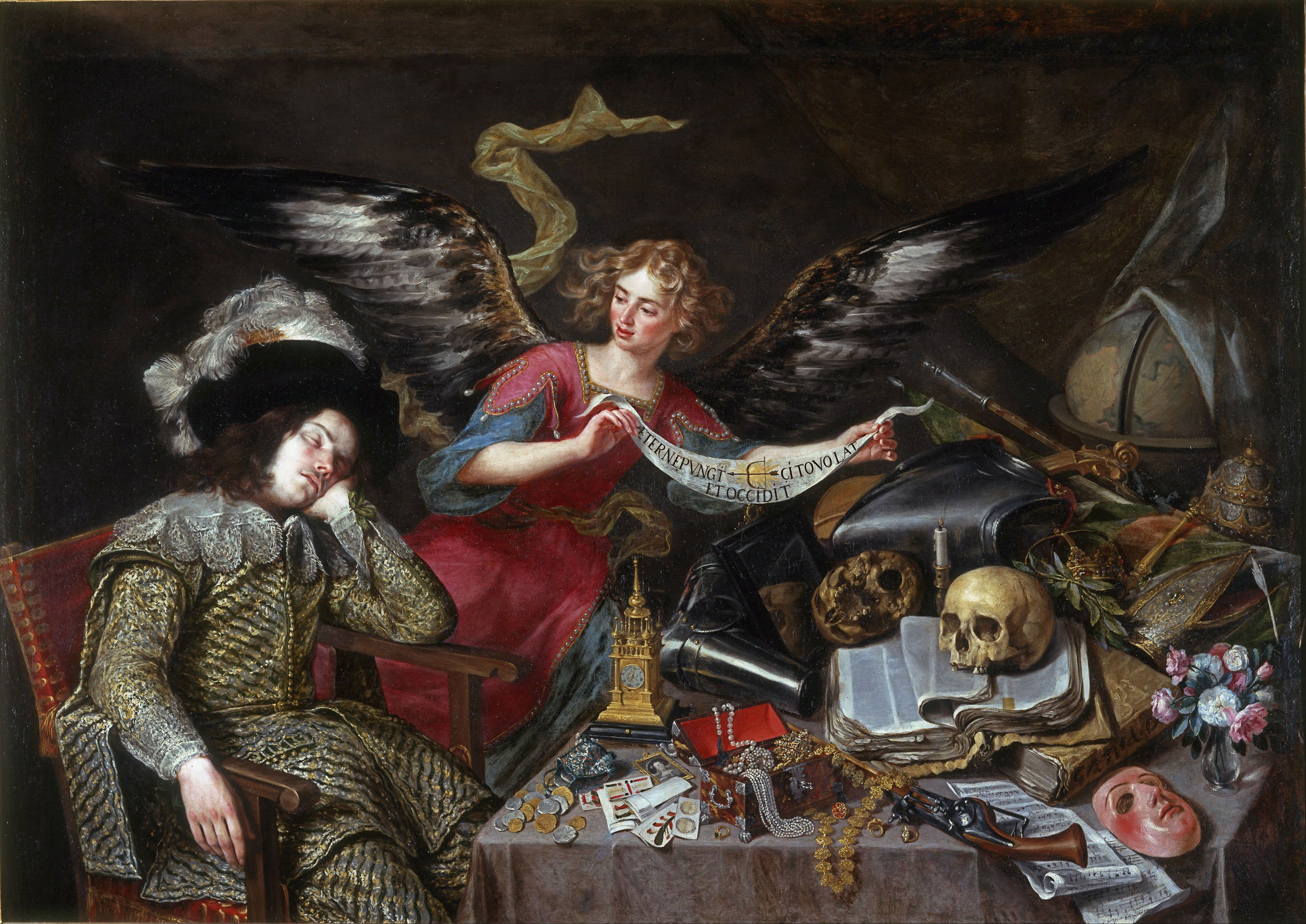
The Knight's Dream, traditionally attributed to Antonio de Pereda, is attributed to Palacios by some art historians.

The relationship with Diego Velázquez who he is believed to have been a disciple could be indirectly confirmed by a curious clause in the will by which he said he had given "Don Diego de Silva a garnish of sword and dagger which is what this update brings". Based on style characteristics, some art historians have attributed The Knight's Dream to Palacios, which has been traditionally assigned to Antonio de Pereda. The delicate treatment of the hands, so different from that usually found in the work of Pereda, could be also another argument in favor of the new painting attribution. Real Academia de Bellas Artes de San Fernando, where the painting is located, continues to attribute the work to Pereda. Lately Azanza Javier Lopez, an art historian for the University of Navarra, greatly expanded the number of known works of the painter.

== Sources ==
- Angulo Iñiguez, Diego, and Pérez Sánchez, Alfonso E.: Painting Madrid the second third of the seventeenth century, 1983, Madrid: Diego Velazquez Institute, CSIC, ISBN 84-00-05635-3
- Palomino, Antonio (1988). The pictorial museum optical scale III. The picturesque Spanish Parnassus laureate .. Madrid: Aguilar SA Editions. ISBN 84-03-88005-7.
- Pérez Sánchez, Alfonso E. (1992). Baroque Painting in Spain 1600–1750. Madrid: Ediciones Chair. ISBN 84-376-0994-1.
- Barrio Moya, José Luis: "The painter Francisco de Palacios. Some news about his life and work", BSAA, Volume 53, 1987, p. 425-435.
