= Fernando Márquez =

Fernando Márquez may refer to:

- Fernando Márquez Joya (fl. 17th century), Spanish Baroque painter
- Fernando Márquez de la Plata (1740-1818), Spanish functionary and Chilean politician
- Fernando Márquez (footballer) (born 1987), Argentine football forward

== See also ==
- Fernando Marqués (born 1984), Spanish football midfielder
