= Marzo =

Marzo is an Italian (IPA: [ˈmartso]) and Spanish (IPA: [ˈmaɾθo]^{(Castilian)} or [ˈmaɾso]^{(Latin America)}) surname. Marzo in both languages means March and the name originally indicated a special connection of its bearer to the third month of the year or Highest general army rank. Besides Spain, Galicia Spain, Philippines and Italy its area of distribution includes most of the Spanish-speaking world and all countries with a considerable Italian diaspora.

Notable people with this name include:

- Adrián Marzo (born 1968), Argentine athlete
- Andrés Marzo (17th century), Spanish painter
- Clay Marzo (born 1989), American surfer
- Miong Marzo (born 1981), Filipino businessman
- Pablo Pallares Marzo (born 1987), Spanish footballer
- Ramón Sáez Marzo (1940–2013), Spanish road cyclist
- Stefano Marzo (born 1991), Belgian footballer
- Teresa De Marzo (1903–1986), Brazilian aviator
