= Juan de Licalde =

Spanish painter

Juan de Licalde (17th century) was a Spanish painter. He trained with Pedro de las Cuevas. A pen drawing of a Crowned Lion upholding a Shield of the Arms of Spain and Portugal was seen by Juan Agustín Ceán Bermúdez in the collection of Don Pedro Gonzalez de Sepulveda, and was dated 10 November 1628. He made a clever pen-and-ink portrait of the Duke of Olivarez, Philip IV’s minister.
