= Andrés Leyto =

Spanish painter

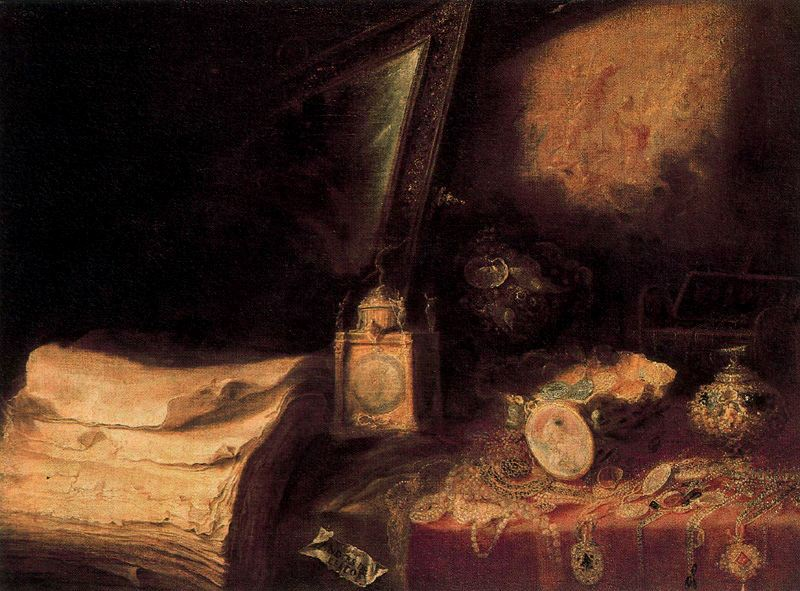
Andrés Deleito, Vanitas.

Andrés Deleito or Andrés de Leyto (active in Madrid in 1680) was a Spanish painter of historical subjects and interiors. He painted, in conjunction with José de Sarabia, pictures in the cloister of the convent of San Francisco at Segovia. He is mentioned briefly by Juan Agustín Ceán Bermúdez as "De Leito." 19th Century English art books refer to him as "Leyto".
