= Antonio Bisquert =

Spanish painter

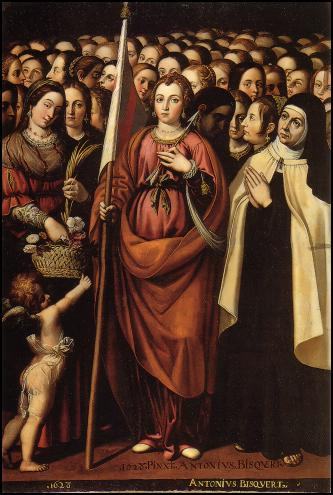
Saint Ursula and the holy Jesus by Antonio Bisquert, Teruel Cathedral, 1623

Antonio Bisquert (1596 – 1646) was a Spanish painter of the Baroque period.

He was born in Valencia, where he became a pupil of Francisco Ribalta. He established himself at Teruel in 1620 where he got married.

In his works, religious and subject always to a clientele that, in his case, it seems exclusively ecclesiastical and intended for the decoration of religious buildings, such as the great pictorial cycles of the life of San Lorenzo for your church or Huesca of the Life of St. Vincent for San Gil in Zaragoza, formerly attributed to Jusepe Martínez, can stand a manifest good taste for the representation of everyday objects and supporting details.

Antonio Ponz, on a visit to the Teruel Cathedral, praised his altarpiece of the Eleven Thousand Virgins signed "1628: Pinxit: Antonius Bisquert" and holding him by "Professor of much merit". The art historian Juan Agustín Ceán Bermúdez compiled some news about him in his historical Dictionary. He died in 1646.
