= Luís Alimbrot =

Netherlandish painter

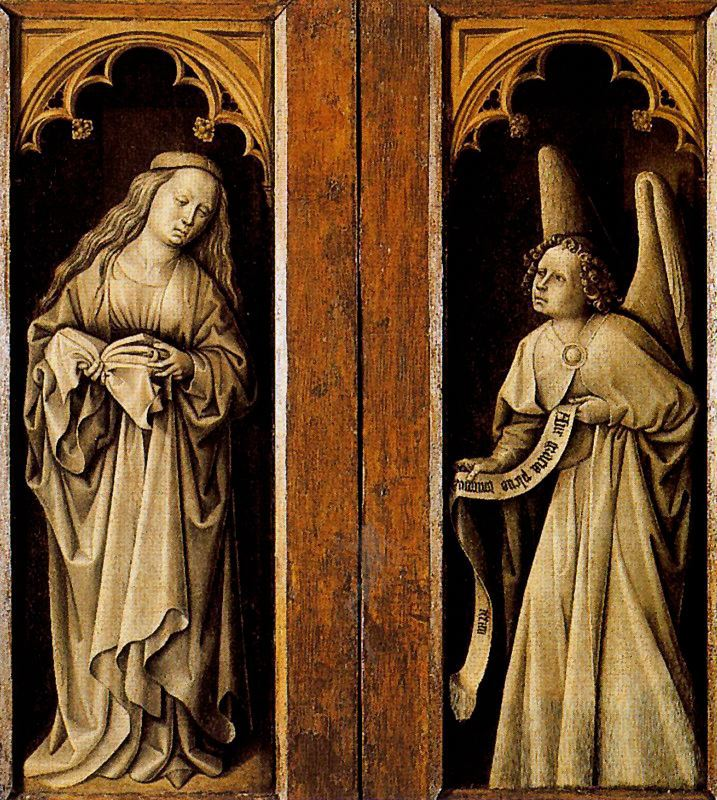
Annunciation, Museo del Prado, Madrid

Luís Alimbrot (1400s – 1460s), was a Netherlandish painter from Bruges who is known for his work in Spain.

== Biography ==
He was trained to be a painter in Bruges, where he was a member of the Guild of Saint Luke during the years 1432-1437. He later became the father of Joris (or Jordi) Alincbrod, and worked in Valencia, where some works survive.

He died in Valencia between 1460 and 1463.
