= Juan Ramírez de Arellano (painter) =

Spanish painter

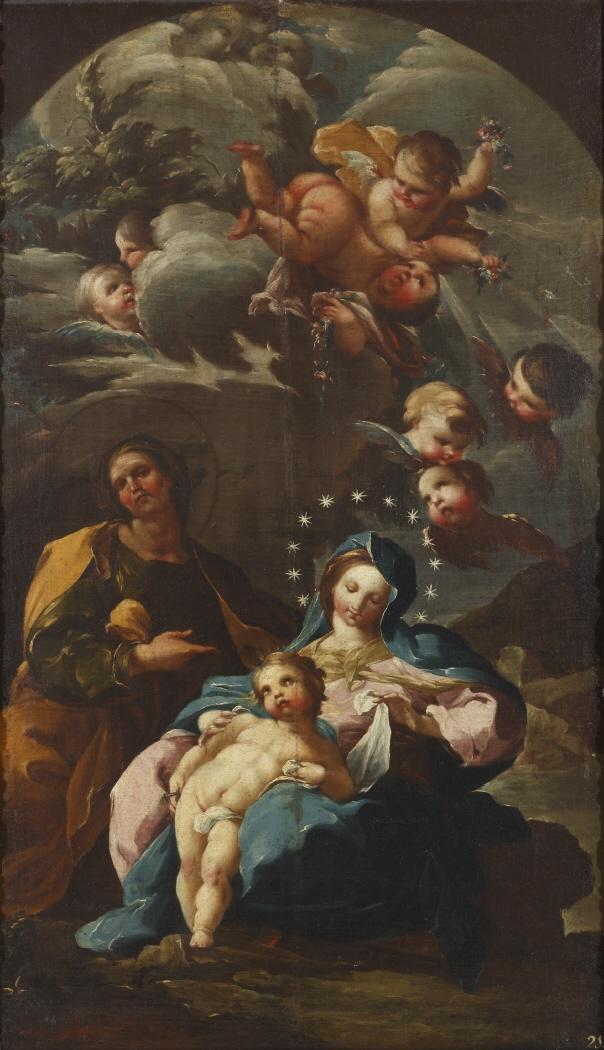
The Virgin and Child with St. Anne by Juan Ramírez de Arellano, National Museum of Romanticism, 1755

Juan Ramírez de Arellano (1725–1782) was a Spanish Baroque painter.

Ramírez was a member of a family of artists from Aragon. He was the son of the sculptor Juan Ramírez Mejandre, and brother of sculptor José Ramírez de Arellano, who helped in the colors of some of his works for churches in Zaragoza. He first trained with José Luzán and later moved to Madrid with his countryman, Pablo Pernicharo. His works also show an influence of Corrado Giaquinto.

Among the few known works by his hand, include the Virgin and Child with St. Anne (National Museum of Romanticism and sketch in the Museo del Prado) which, despite being signed J. Ra z, was claimed in the past the young Francisco Goya. He also painted a portrait of the Charles III of Spain (Real Academia de Bellas Artes de San Fernando).

== External links and references ==
- Pérez Sánchez, A. E., "Juan Ramirez : a new name in the catalog of the Prado" Spanish Art Archive, Vol. XLII, No. 165, 1969, p. 55-57 .
- Urrea Fernandez, J., "Some comments on Juan Ramirez de Arellano" Spanish Art Archive, Vol. XLIV, No. 175, 1971, p. 342-343 .
