= José Roma =

Spanish painter

José Roma (1784–1847) was a painter from Spain, active in Valencia and mainly painting still life floral arrangements.
