= Isaac Lievendal =

Spanish engraver

Isaac Lievendal was a Spanish engraver, who resided at Granada in the reign of Philip IV (1621–1665).
