= José Ramírez de Arellano =

Spanish architect and sculptor (C. 1705-1770)

- Born: c. 1705
- Died: March 27, 1770; Zaragoza
- Known for: managing the works of Basilica of Our Lady of the Pillar
- Style: Baroque
- Father: Juan Ramírez Mejandre

José Ramírez de Arellano, also José Ramírez Benavides, (c. 1705 – March 27, 1770), was a Spanish Baroque architect and sculptor.

== Early life ==
Ramírez was a member of a family of artists from Aragon. He was the son of the sculptor Juan Ramírez Mejandre, and brother of sculptor Manuel Ramírez de Arellano and painter Juan Ramírez de Arellano. He was a director of the first Academy of Drawing of Aragon, founded by his father in 1714, where he was assisted by prominent artists of Zaragoza, as José Luzán who taught Francisco Goya in his first apprenticeship.

== Career ==
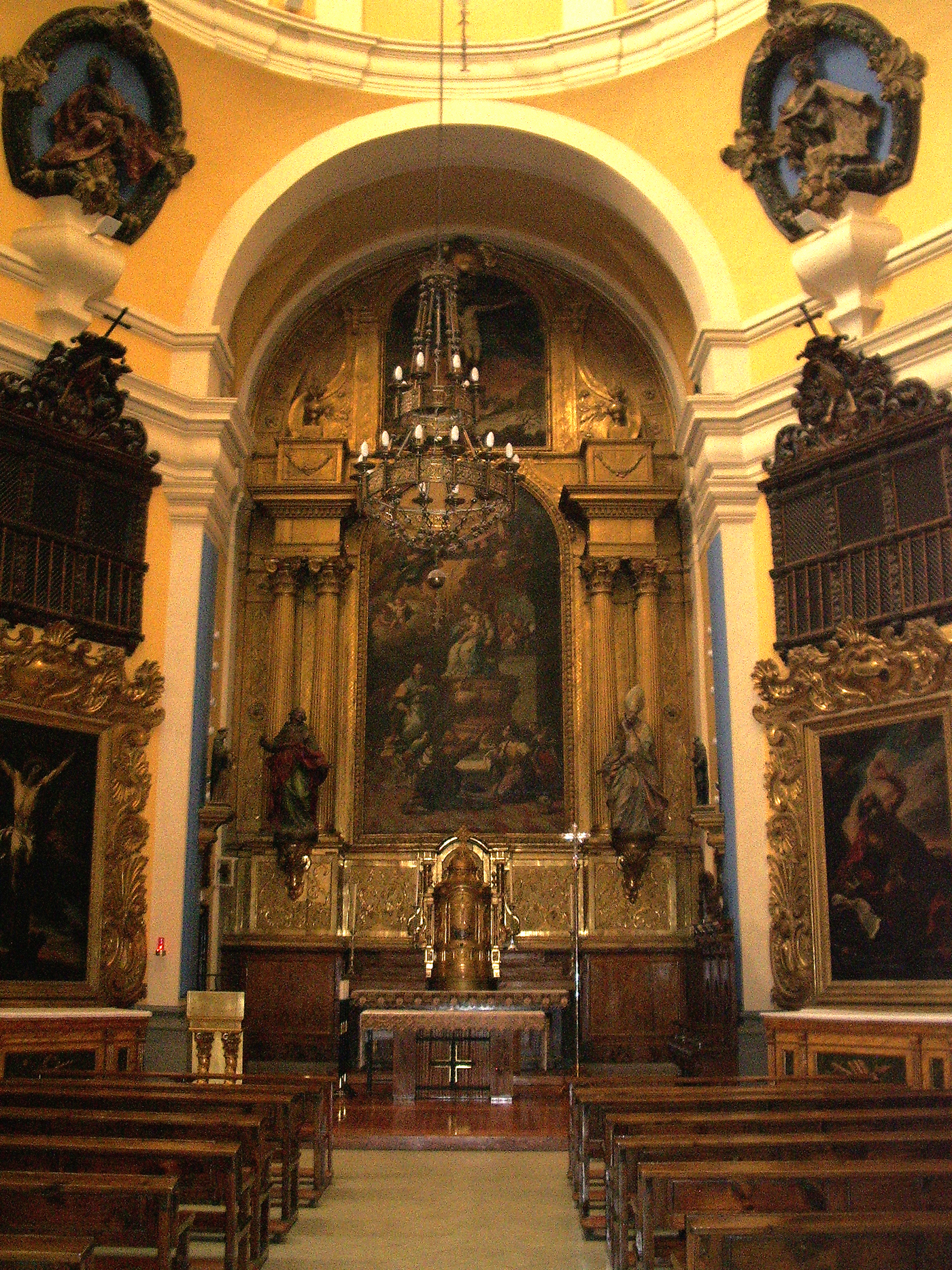
The interior of the church of the Hospital Real y General de Nuestra Señora de Gracia is decorated with sculptures of José Ramírez de Arellano

In 1740, Ramírez was appointed Sculptor to the King (Charles III of Spain). In 1751, he was commissioned to manage the works of Basilica of Our Lady of the Pillar, where he met several renowned artists of that time who were hired to assist in its construction, including the painter Antonio González Velázquez (commissioned to paint the dome above the temple), and Ventura Rodríguez, who delegated almost entirely to Ramírez the building of the tabernacle. From 1752, he moved his home and workshop to Zaragoza which was run by him and his brother Manuel.

== Later years ==
In 1755, Ramírez married Michelle Heras Diego and with whom he had three children who reached adulthood. He became the Royal Academician of the Real Academia de Bellas Artes de San Fernando in 1758. He died in Zaragoza in 1770.
