= Eugenio Caxés =

Spanish artist (1574–1634)

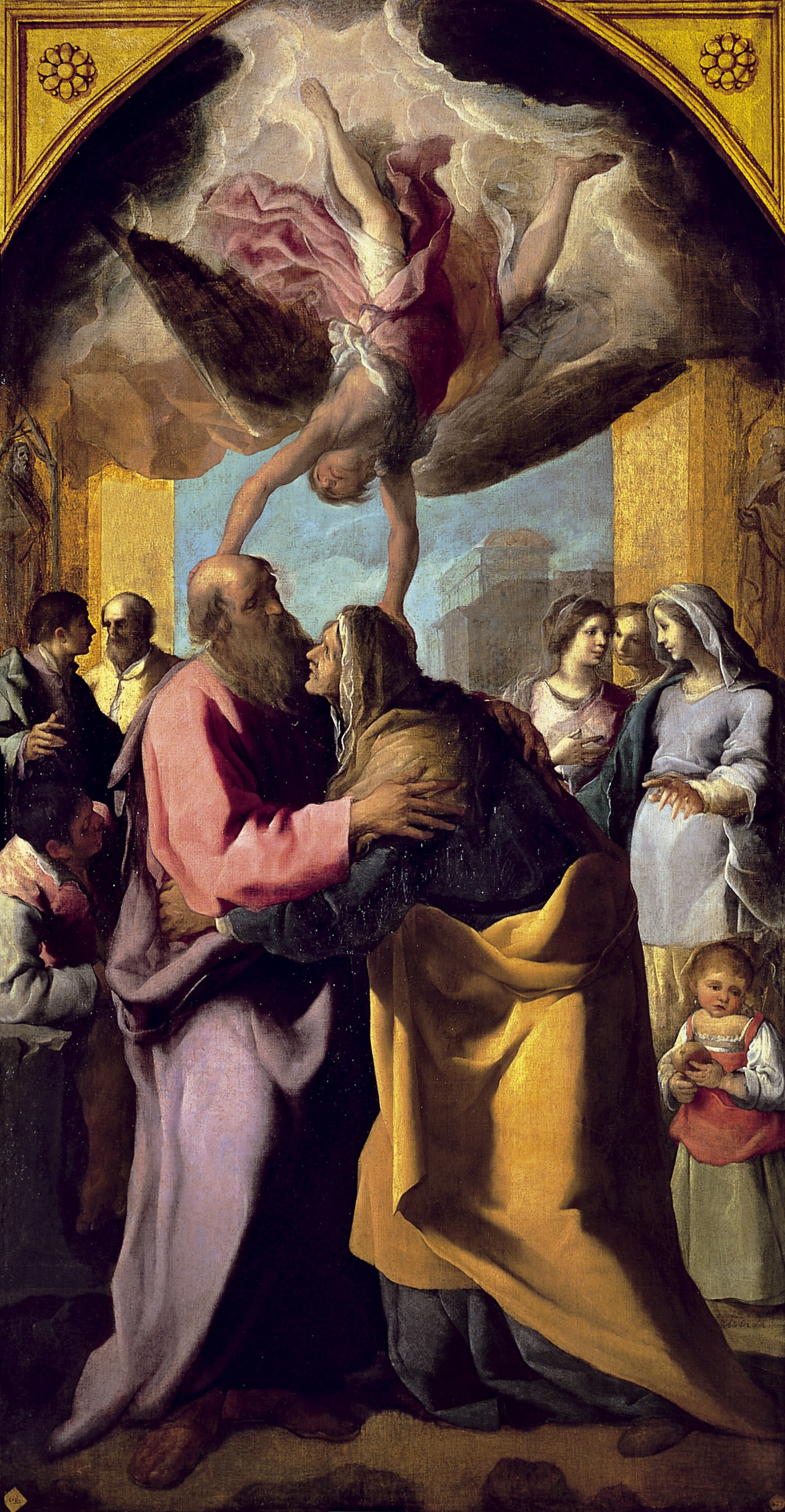
Embrace at the Golden Gate (1605), Royal Academy of Fine Arts of San Fernando, Madrid.

Eugenio Caxés (1574/75 – 15 December 1634) was a Spanish painter of the Baroque period.

== Biography ==
He was born into a Florentine family in Madrid, and wrote his name in a variety of ways (Cajés, Cazés, Caxesi, and Caxete). His father, Patricio, was a disciple of Alessandro Allori and was recruited to Spain by the ambassador Luis de Requesens. Caxés painted in the royal palaces of King Philip II of Spain. He married the daughter of the disgraced Juan Manzano, master carpenter for the Escorial, who died in a fall from a scaffold.

Caxés was commissioned by the administration of King Philip III to decorate the room for royal audiences in Madrid, where he painted a Judgment of Solomon in the vault. He was appointed Painter to the King in August 1612. Most of his works were completed in Madrid. Along with Vincenzo Carducci he painted the chapel of Our Lady del Sagrario in Toledo, and the canvases of the Retablo Mayor del Monasterio de Guadalupe. He was awarded 11,000 reales for a large historical canvas on the History of Agamemnon (now lost). Among his pupils are Luis Fernández and the priest Pedro de Valpuesta.

He opposed a fee proposed to extend the alcabala to painters.

The Prado Museum owns an ensemble of paintings and drawings by Caxés, and also at the Real Academia de Bellas Artes de San Fernando another religious work Embrace at the Golden Gate can be seen.

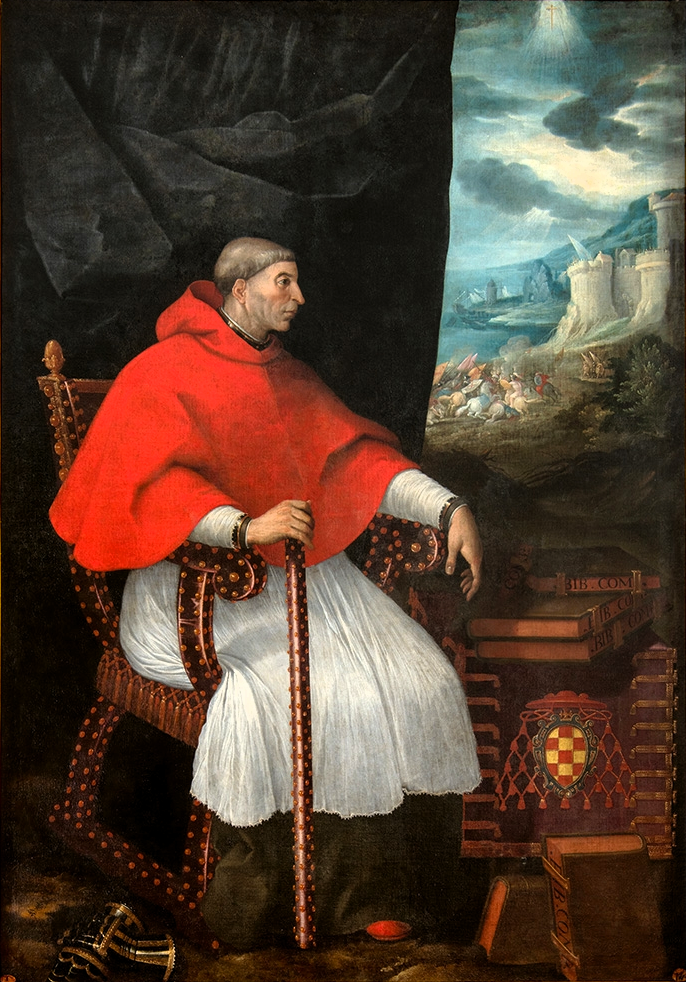
Portrait of Cardinal Cisneros (1604)

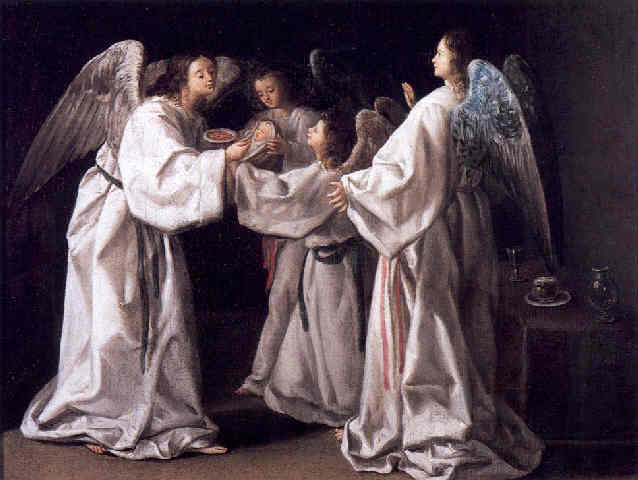
Saint Raymond Nonnatus Being Nourished by the Angels (1630)

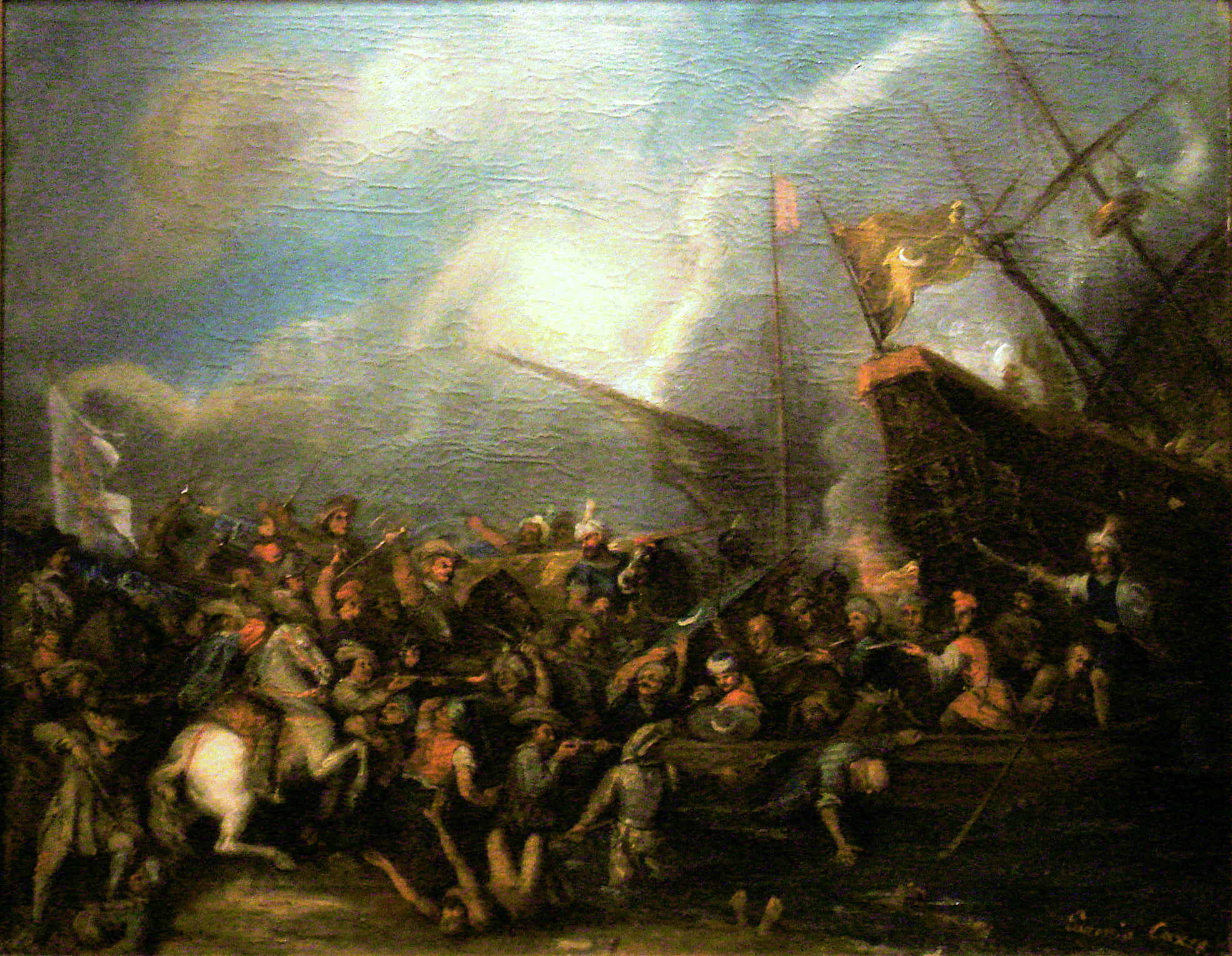
Turgut Reis landing on Malta

== Sources ==
- Madrazo, Pedro de (1872). Catálogo Descriptivo e Histórico del Museo del Prado de Madrid (Parte Primera: Escuelas Italianas y Españolas). M. Rivadeneyra. pp. 381–382.
