= Agustín Leonardo =

Spanish painter

Agustín Leonardo was a Spanish painter of the Baroque period.

He was born in Valencia, and took up the habit of the Order of Mercy at Xàtiva. In 1620 he was a brother in the convent of that order at Puig near Valencia, where he painted for the sacristy four large canvases: Finding the Image of Our Lady at Puig, Siege and Surrender of Valencia to King James; and the Battle of the Puig in which St. George fought with Christians. He afterwards visited Seville, where he painted a Christ and the Samarian Woman (1624). In 1624-5 he was called to Madrid, where he painted two pictures for the great staircase of the Convent of Mercy. He excelled in portraiture, and painted a portrait of Gabriel Bocangel, the poet. The date and place of his death is uncertain.
