= Miguel Jerónimo de Cieza =

Spanish painter

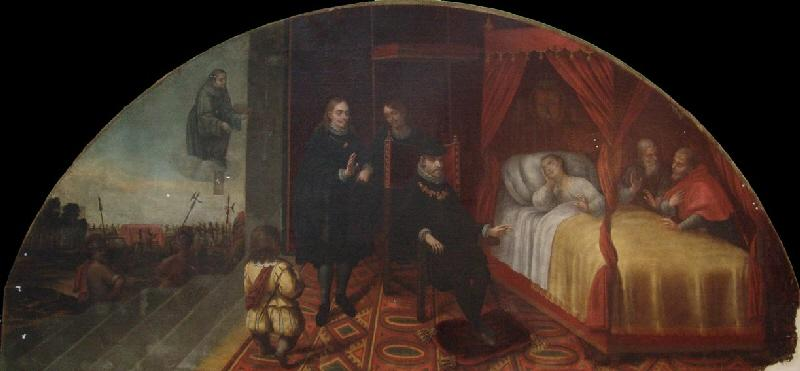
Philip II of Spain visits Carlos, Prince of Asturias, now in the Museo de Bellas Artes de Granada.

Miguel Jerónimo de Cieza (1611–1685) was a Spanish painter.

Jerónimo de Cieza was born at Granada, and was a scholar of Alonso Cano, whom he imitated both in drawing and in colour. He painted historical pictures, and according to Palomino, his best works are in the Convent of the Angel, and in the Hospital of the Corpus Domini, at Granada. He died in Granada in 1685.

His son was José de Cieza.
