= Pedro Sánchez de Castro =

Spanish Gothic painter

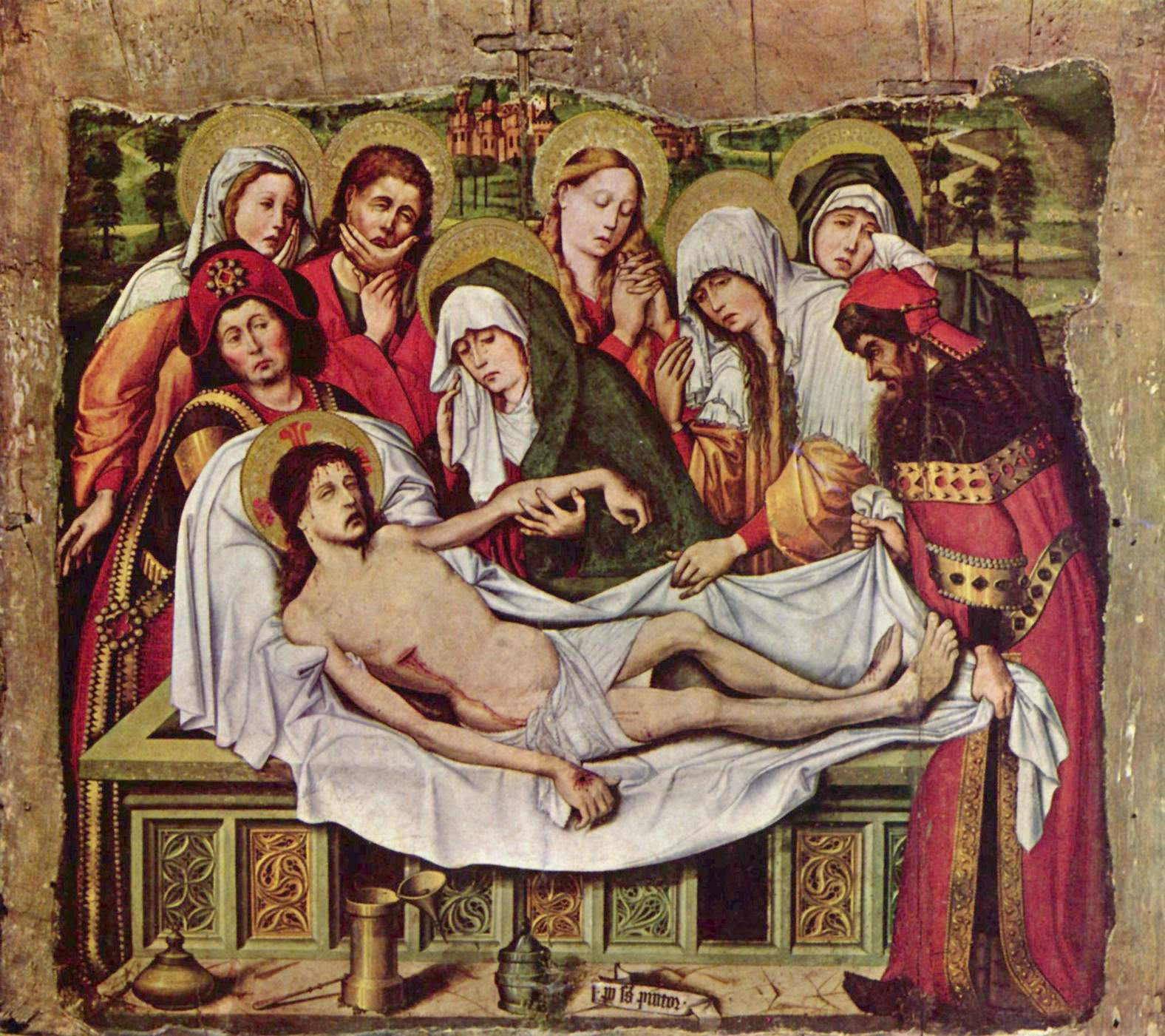
The Entombment of Christ by Pedro Sánchez de Castro, tempera on wood, Museum of Fine Arts, Budapest

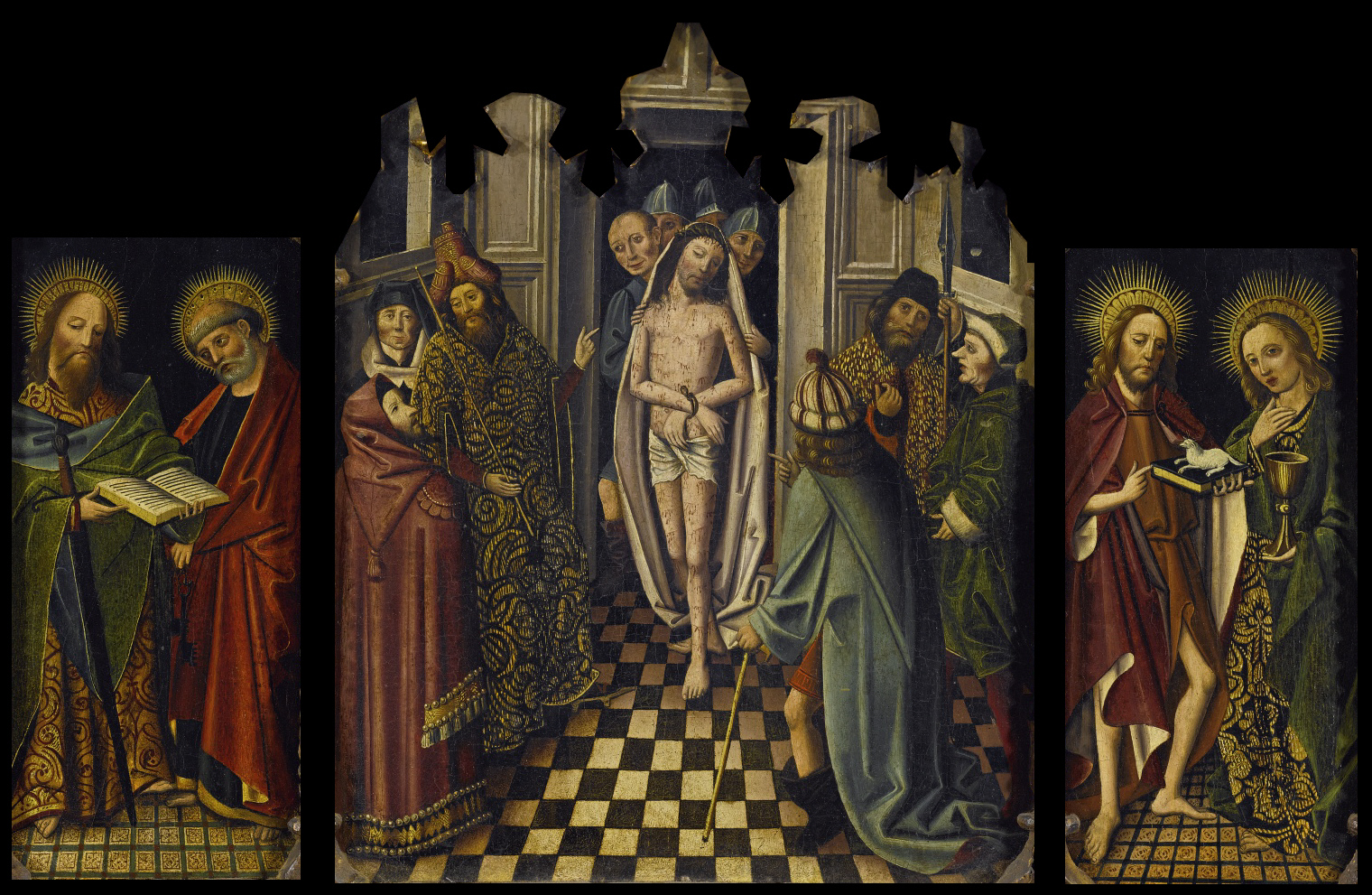
A triptych with Christ before Pilate, with Saints Paul, Peter, John the Baptist and John the Evangelist by Pedro Sánchez de Castro, was at Metropolitan Museum of Art, now private collection

Pedro Sánchez de Castro, (fl. 1454–1484) was a Spanish Gothic painter. His dates of birth and death are unknown.

Sánchez de Castro has been identified primarily through his works. He lived and worked all his life in his native Seville. He painted religious themed works for local churches.

He died in Sevilla. A surviving triptych was at the Metropolitan Museum of Art, but was auctioned off in 2013 to a private collector.
