= The Gentleman's Dream =

1650s vanitas painting by Antonio de Pereda

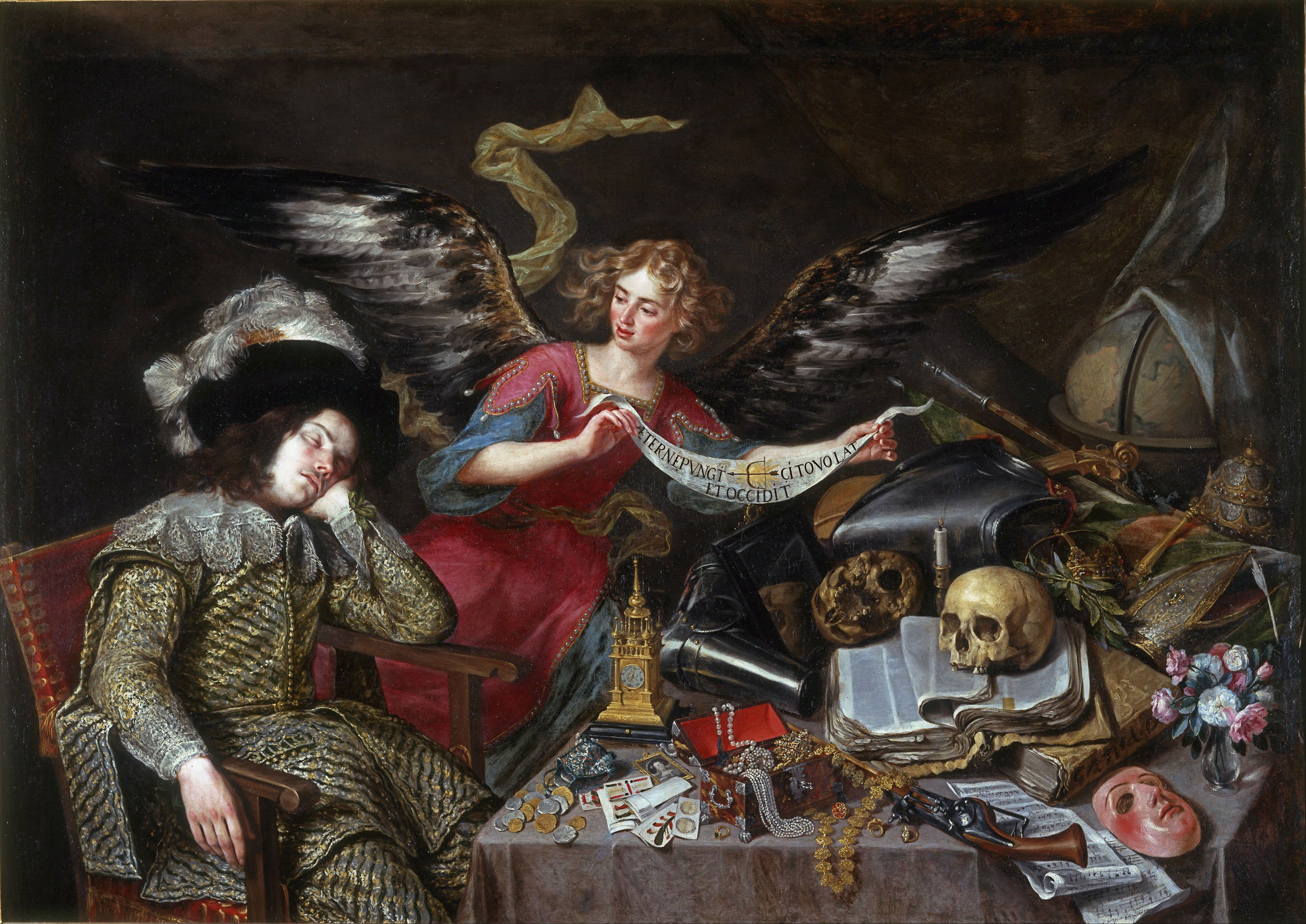
On the banner: Aeterne pungit, cito volat et occidit "Eternally it stings, swiftly it flies and it kills"

The Gentleman's Dream, The Knight's Dream or Dillusion with the World (Spanish: El sueño del caballero) is a 1650s vanitas painting by the Spanish artist Antonio de Pereda. It is now in the Real Academia de Bellas Artes de San Fernando, whose collections it entered in 1816.
