= Cristóbal Vela =

Spanish painter

- Occupations: Baroque painter and gilder

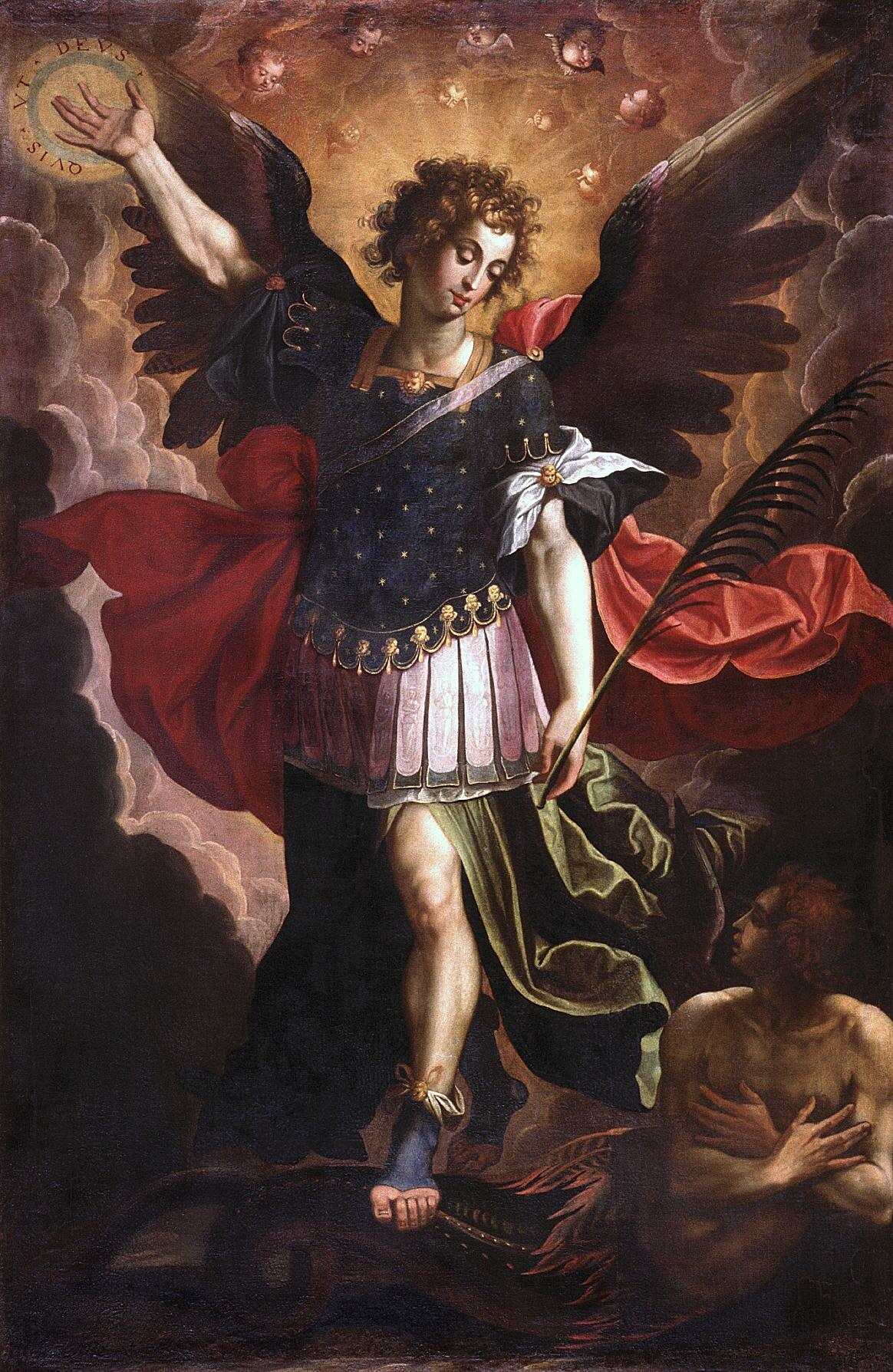
San Miguel by Cristóbal Vela, oil on canvas (177 x 117 cm.), Museum of Fine Arts, Cordoba. Copy of an engraving by Hieronymus Wierix from Marten de Vos, from the monastery of San Jeronimo de Valparaiso, circa 1630

Cristóbal Vela (c. 1588-1658) was a Spanish Baroque painter and gilder.

Born in Jaén, Spain, it is agreed that Vela studied the first principles of painting in Córdoba, Andalusia, under Pablo de Céspedes. He then moved to Madrid, where he completed his art studies under Vincenzo Carducci. Some sources also claim that Vela studied in Seville beginning in 1610, and that his work is influenced by the Sevilian school. At the end of his education, Vela worked with two art dealers in Seville, Carlos Atabante and Juan de Quintanilla. For Atabante, Vela painted 330 canvases of different themes and sizes, and for de Quintanilla, he painted 300 religious pieces, some of which had profane themes. He followed the Mannerist style, and was influenced by both Naturalism and Spanish architecture.

In 1618, Vela took over work on the golden altarpiece of San Anton in the church of San Juan. In 1619, he was hired to create an altarpiece for a client in Campillo de Arenas.

In 1627, Vela was working in Priego. His work on the altarpieces of Saint Peter and Our Lady of the Rosary in the parish church are among his oldest surviving works in Córdoba. In Priego, he married Catherine Garrido and had a son, Antonio Vela Cobo (1629-1675), who became a painter, sculptor, and gilder. By 1635, Vela had relocated to Córdoba, where he worked as a painter and gilder of altarpieces and sculptures. In 1645, he was commissioned to complete altarpiece paintings of the Mosque–Cathedral of Córdoba after winning a competition alongside Antonio del Castillo y Saavedra. Although he was likely selected due to his seniority and status in Córdoba society, this is considered to be one of Vela's achievements.

Vela's most acclaimed work was painted at the church of San Agustín de Córdoba, with most of his archangels now located at the Fine Arts Museum of Córdoba and the church of Santa Marina. Other famous works of his include the upper choir of San Agustín de Córdoba, which follows the iconographic style of Francisco Pacheco and his prophet series for the convent of St. Augustine.

Cristóbal Vela died in 1658 when he fell into a well at his house and drowned. After his death, his son Antonio took over his workshop. Many of Vela's works are now considered lost, while several others suffered irreversible damage due to unskilled restoration.
