= Francisco de Reyna =

Spanish painter

Francisco de Reyna was a Spanish painter of the Baroque period. He was a native and active in Seville, where he trained with Francisco de Herrera the Elder. He painted a Souls in Purgatory in the church of All Saints, at Seville in 1659. He died young.
