= Cristóbal Lloréns =

Spanish painter

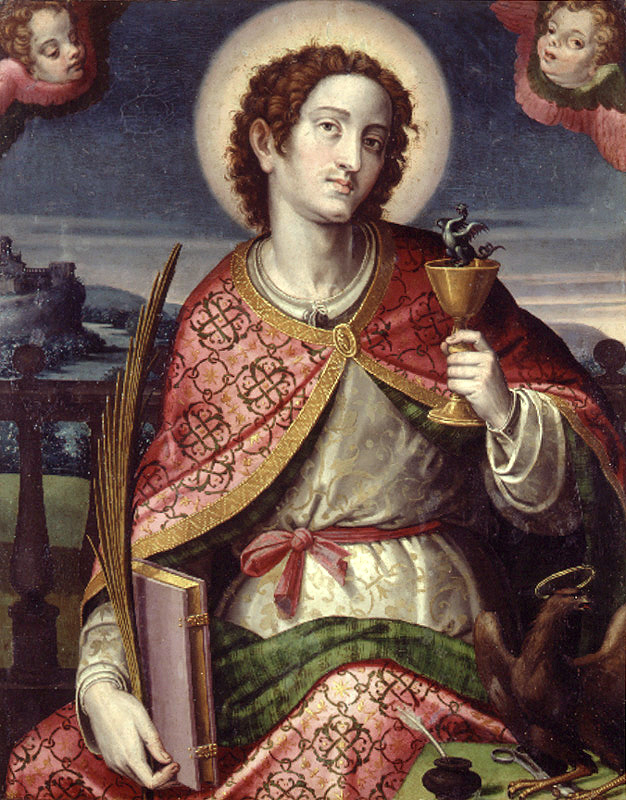

Cristóbal Lloréns was a Spanish painter, active during the late-Renaissance period. He lived in Valencia about 1597. He painted a history of St. Mary Magdalene and St. Sebastian (now lost) for the conventual church of San Miguel de his Reyes. He died in 1617.
