= Juan Ramírez Mejandre =

Spanish sculptor

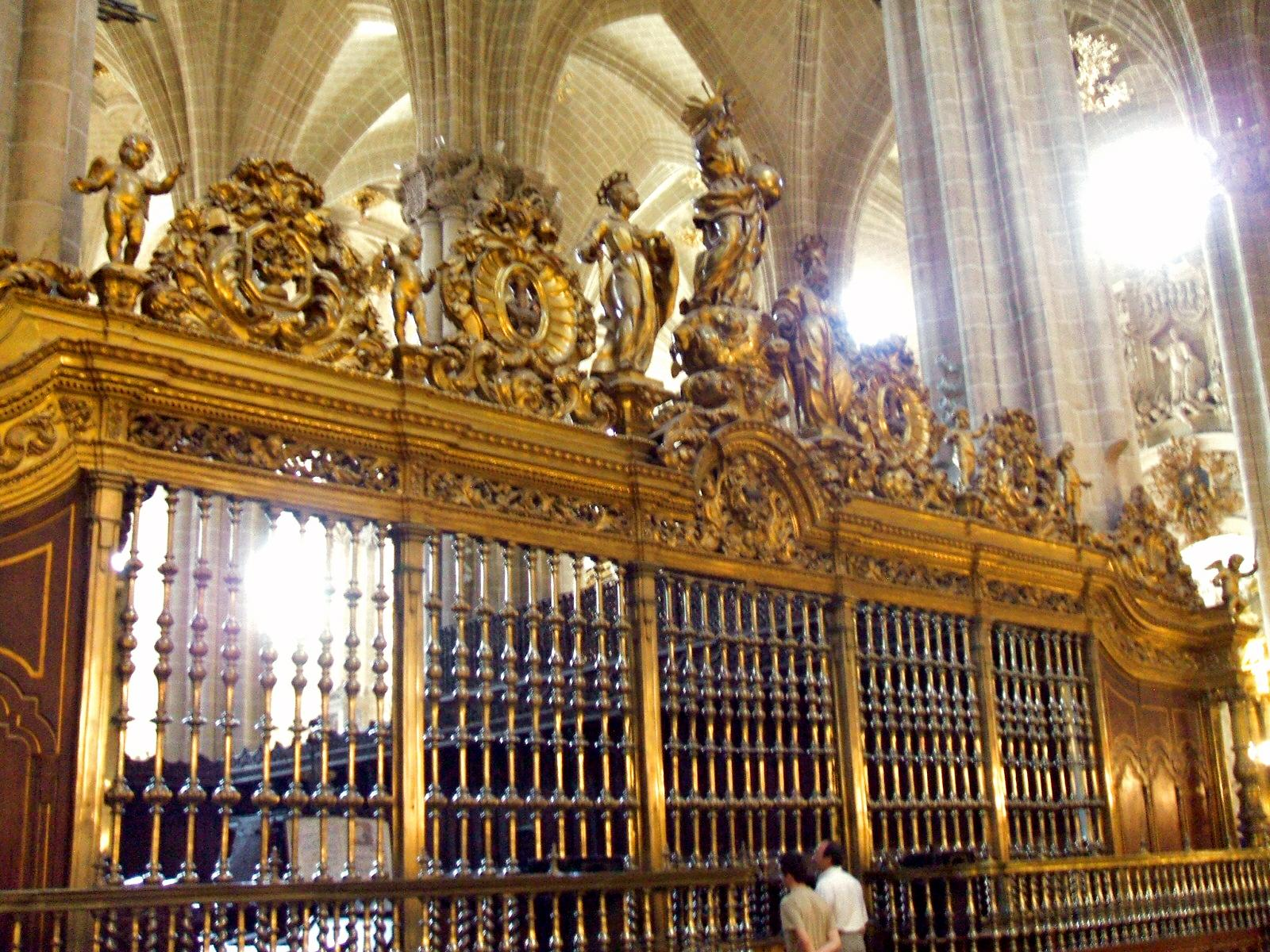
sculptures on the choir screen of the La Seo Cathedral by Juan Ramírez Mejandre

Juan Ramírez Mejandre (23 March 1680 – 15 July 1739) was a Spanish Baroque sculptor.

Ramírez was the head of a family of artists from Aragon. He was the father of the sculptors Manuel Ramirez de Arellano and José Ramírez de Arellano, and the painter Juan Ramírez de Arellano. He first trained with the sculptor Gregorio Aragon Mesa. He was the founder of a Drawing Academy (1714-1739) in the city of Zaragoza, and by the end of the War of the Spanish Succession was considered one of the best Aragonese sculptors of the eighteenth century. Most of his works are preserved in the La Seo Cathedral.

== External links and references ==
- Ramirez Family in the Great Aragon Encyclopedia (Spanish)
