= Juan Bautista de Espinosa =

Spanish painter

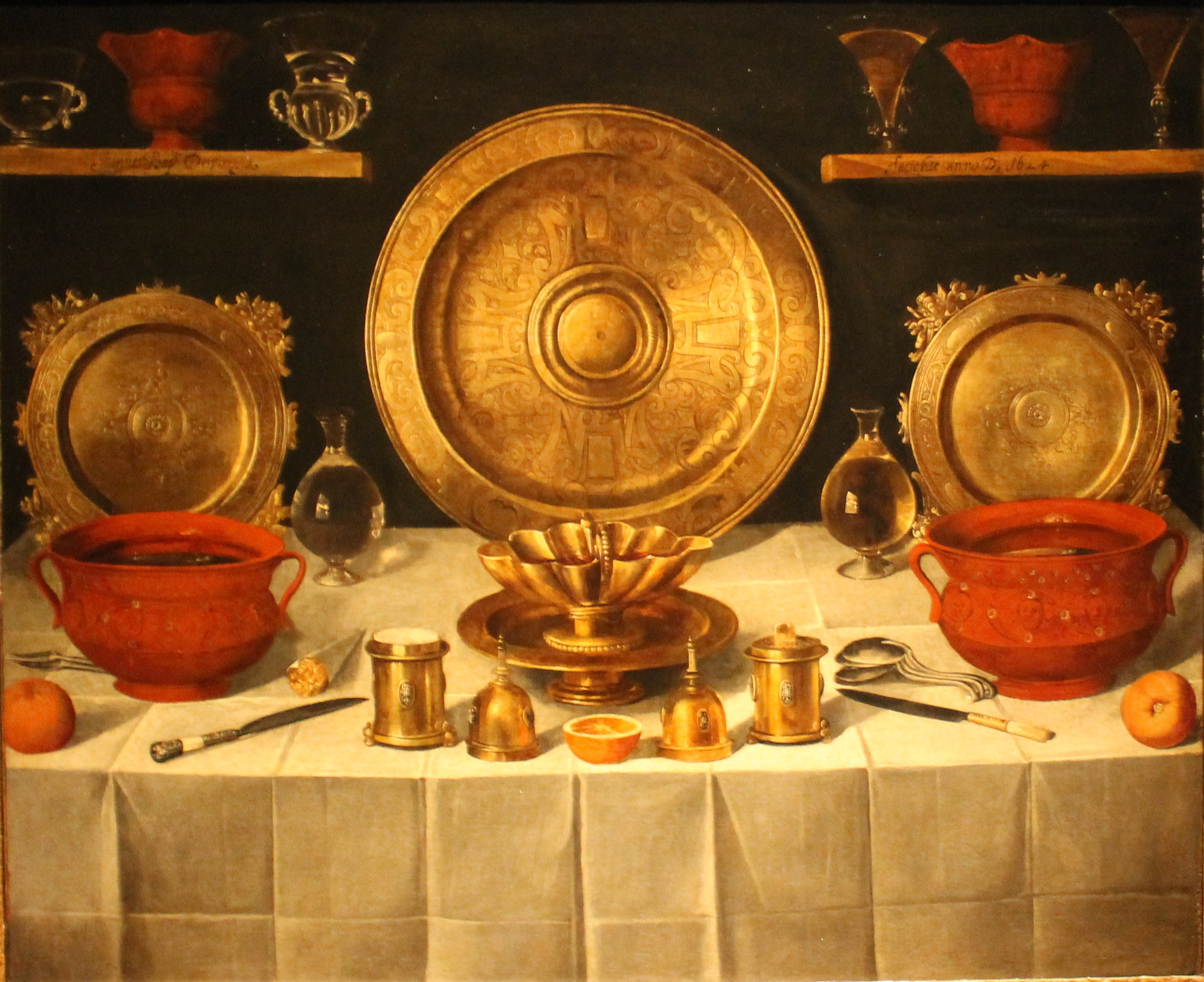
Still Life Of Jewelry (1624), by Juan Bautista de Espinosa

Juan Bautista de Espinosa (1590–1641) was a Spanish painter. Much of his work, which included religious paintings and portraits, is now untraced, and his few known extant paintings are all still lifes.

== Biography ==
Little is known of his life. He worked in Toledo and Madrid from 1612 to 1626 and, judging by his style, he was trained in Holland. De Espinosa's style is judged to be the transition from Flemish Baroque to Spanish Baroque. He died in Madrid.

Several mural paintings in Spanish churches are also attributed to him; one of these is in Alcaudete.
