= Jerónimo Navases =

Spanish painter

Jerónimo Navases (1787–?) was a Spanish painter, active in Valencia and mainly painting still life floral arrangements.
