= Francisco Llamas =

Spanish painter

Francisco Llamas (active 1700) was a Spanish painter of the Baroque period, active in Madrid.

He was a pupil of Luca Giordano. On the ceilings of the halls which separate the two cloisters of the College of Monks in El Escorial, he represented The Trinity, The Creation, Chief Doctors of the Church, Chief Philosophers, The Sciences, The Virtues, The Elements, and several other subjects. He also decorated the Cathedral of Ávila, and the Hermitage of our Lady of Prado, near Talavera de la Reina.
