= Ignacio de León Salcedo =

Spanish painter

Ignacio de León Salcedo (fl. 1655–1685) was a Spanish painter of the Baroque period. He was a pupil of Juan Valdes Leal and studied in the Academy of Seville in 1666–1667. He imitated the style of his master. He painted a San Pedro Nolasco correcting the Novices of his Order for the Convent of Mercy.
