= Master of the Cypresses =

Spanish painter and manuscript illuminator

The Master of the Cypresses is a notname invented by the art historian Diego Angulo Íñiguez in 1928 for a painter and manuscript illuminator working in Seville around the years 1420–1440. The name derives from the frequent appearance of pointed green trees in the backgrounds of figural scenes that resemble the Mediterranean Cypress. These trees, however, only appear in historiated initials painted in choirbooks for Seville Cathedral. Angulo ascribed particular Italian influences to the Master of the Cypresses, including Giotto, along with strong characteristics of early Netherlandish painting. Wall paintings in the refectory at the Ex-Monastery of San Isidoro del Campo and the illumination of a bible currently residing at the El Escorial museum in Madrid (MS I.I.3) have also been attributed to this master, argued by the art historian Rosario Marchena Hidalgo to be identified as Nicolás Gómez.
