= Vicente Requena the Elder =

Spanish painter

Vincente Requena the Elder was a Spanish painter of the 16th century. He was born at Cocentaina. By 1590 he was practicing at Valencia. He painted the Immaculate Conception, and the Saints Jerome and Anne for the church of the monastery of San Miguel de los Reyes. He painted St. Michael for the convent of San Domingo.
