= José de Cieza =

Spanish painter

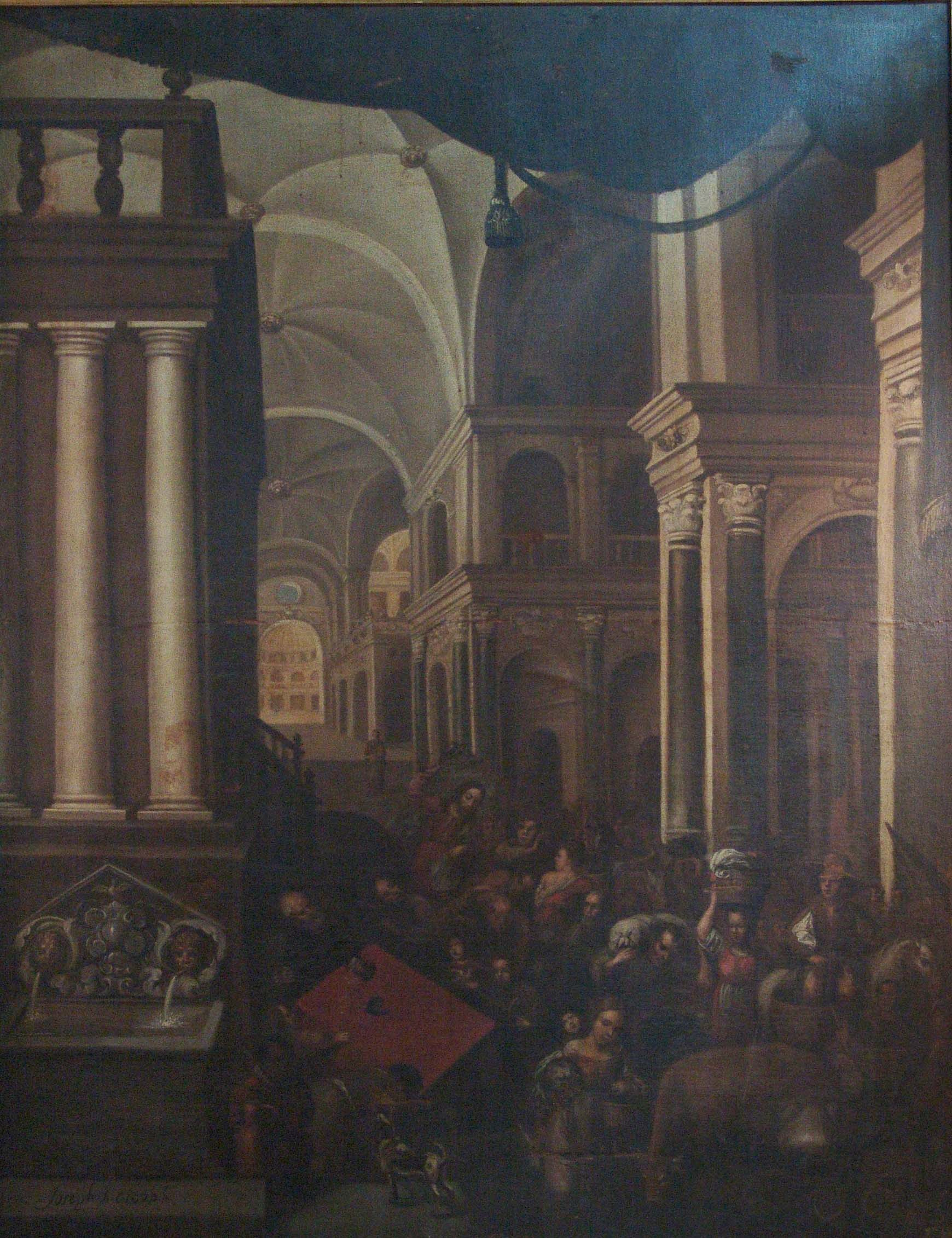
Cleansing of the Temple, now in the Museo de Bellas Artes de Granada.

José de Cieza (1656–1692) was a Spanish painter.

He was the son and scholar of Miguel Geronimo de Cieza, was born at Granada. He acquired much facility in painting in distemper, and, going to Madrid in 1686, was employed to paint scenes in the theatre of Buenretiro, and became painter to the king in 1689. He likewise painted in oil historical subjects, landscapes, and flower-pieces. He died at Madrid.
