= Juan de Loaysa y Giron =

Spanish painter

Juan de Loaysa y Girón was a Spanish painter, active during the Baroque period. He lived in Seville in 1669. He canon of the cathedral and one of the founders of the Academy of Seville, along with Murillo.
