= Antonio Vela Cobo =

Spanish painter

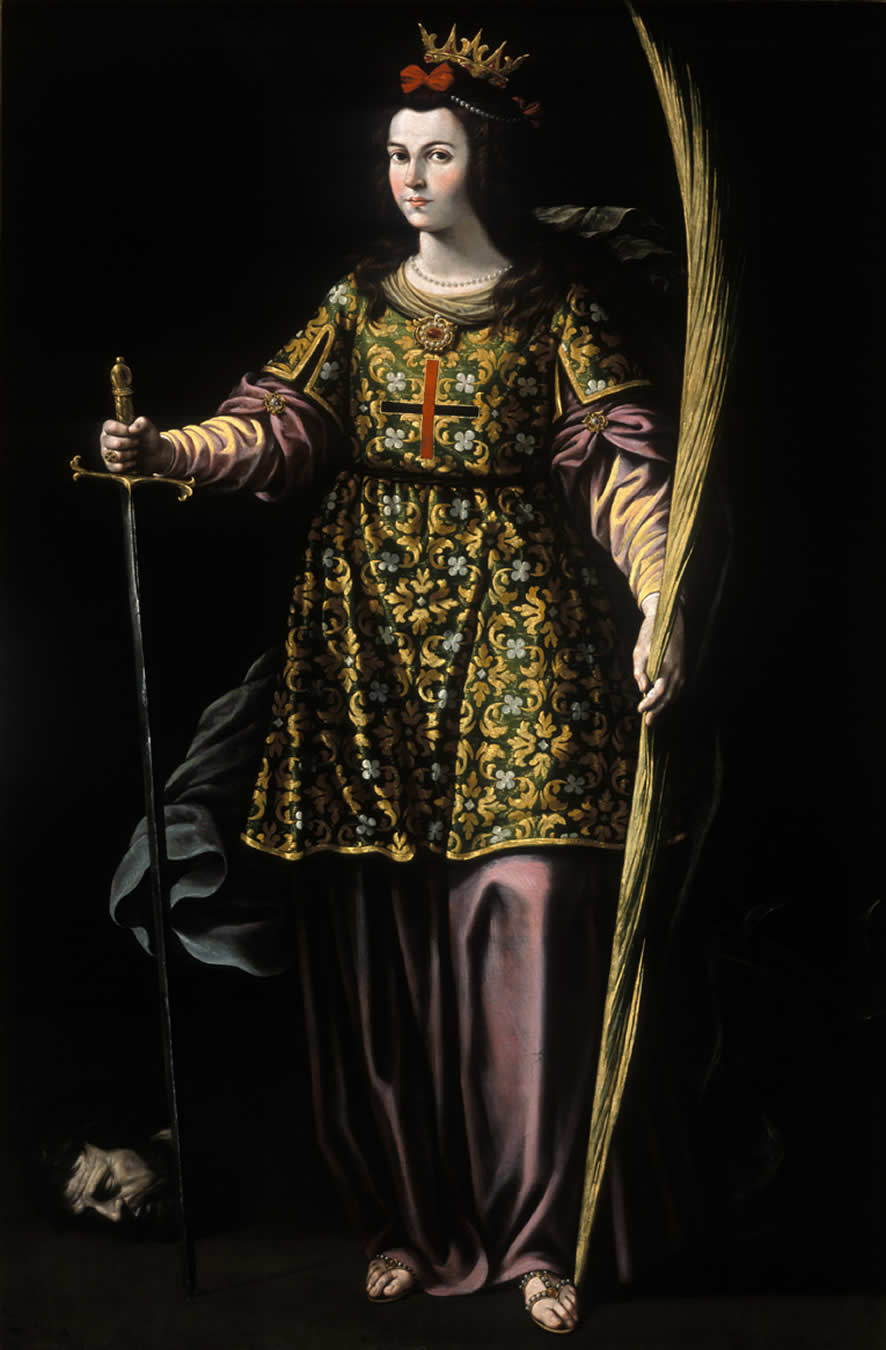
Santa Catalina de Alejandría (Saint Catherine of Alexandria) by Antonio Vela Cobo, Museo de Bellas Artes, Córdoba, 1660-1670

Antonio Vela Cobo (1629-1675) was a Spanish Baroque painter, sculptor and gilder.

Cobo was the son of the painter and gilder Cristóbal Vela. He primarily produced religious-themed works on commission for various churches and convents in and around Córdoba, Andalusia. After his father's death in 1654, Cobo took over his father's workshop and continued working until his death in 1675.
