= Master of the Retablo of the Reyes Catolicos =

Spanish painter

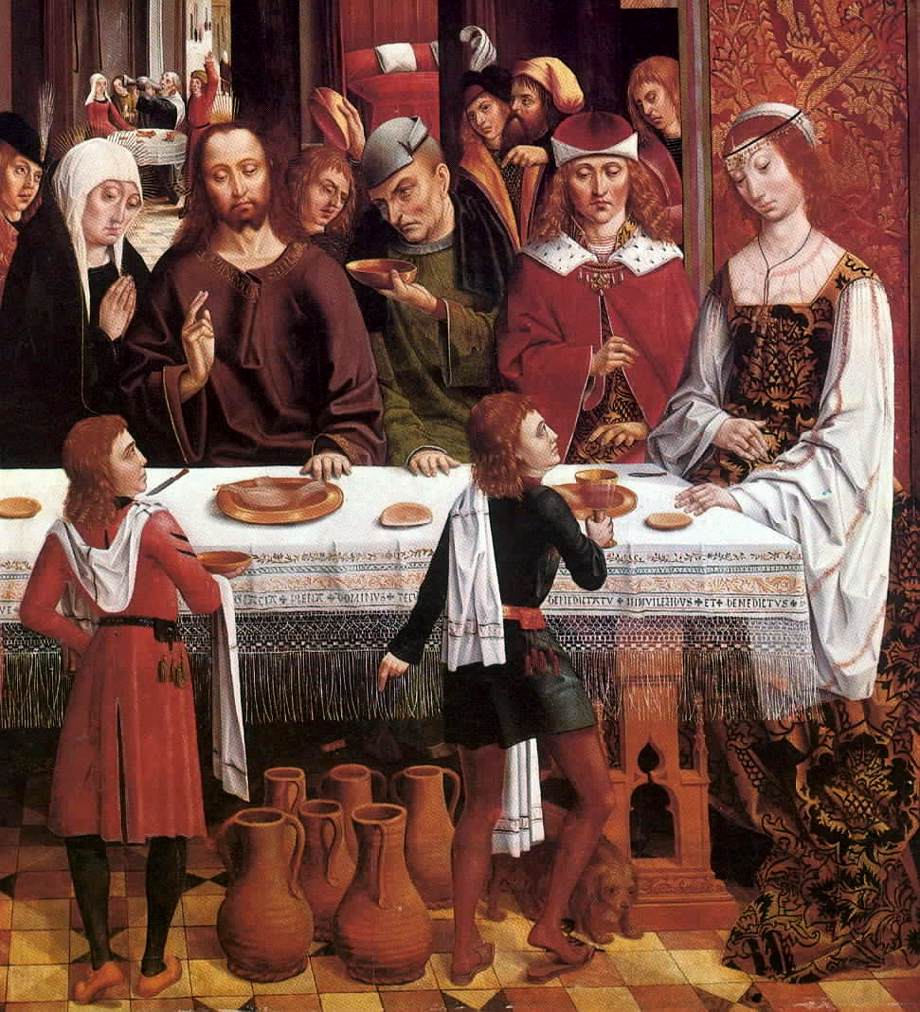
The Marriage at Cana

Master of the Retablo of the Reyes Catolicos, (active 15th century) was a Spanish painter. His dates of birth and death are not known.

The name given to this artist refers to his work on creating retablos for the Catholic Monarchs (Reyes Católicos) Isabella I of Castile and Ferdinand II of Aragon. His works The Nativity and the Annunciation can be found at the California Palace of the Legion of Honor.
