= Pedro Pozo =

Spanish historical painter

Pedro Pozo (early 18th century – c. 1810) was a Spanish historical painter. He was born at Lucena. He first studied under Luis Cancino, and afterwards went to Rome. He eventually abandoned painting for literature. His son, also Pedro and an artist, died in America.
