= Antonio de Pereda =

Spanish artist (1611–1678)

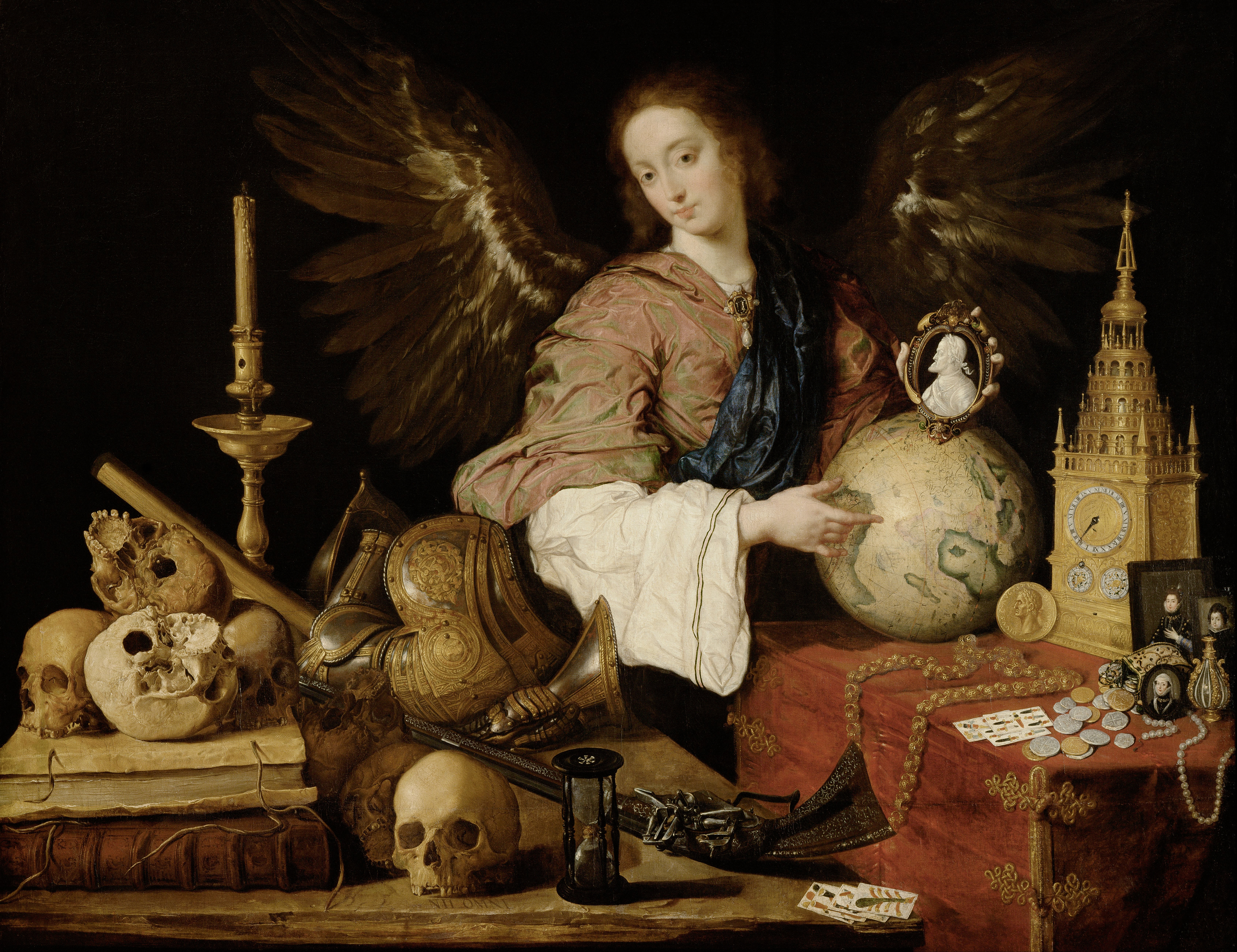
- Allegory of Vanity by Pereda
- Born: Antonio de Pereda y Salgado c. March 1611; Valladolid, Spain
- Died: January 30, 1678 (aged 66–67); Madrid, Spain
- Occupation: Painter

Antonio de Pereda y Salgado (c. 1611 – January 30, 1678) was a Spanish Baroque-era painter, best known for his still lifes.

== Biography ==
Pereda was born in Valladolid, the eldest of three brothers from an artistic family. His father, mother and two brothers were all painters. He was educated in Madrid by Pedro de las Cuevas and was taken under the protective wing of the influential Giovanni Battista Crescenzi.

As well as still lifes and religious paintings, Pereda was known for his historical paintings such as the Relief of Genoa (1635), depicting a historical event of the 1620s. This was painted for the Salón de Reinos of the Buen Retiro Palace in Madrid as part of the same series as Velázquez's Surrender of Breda. After Crescenzi's death in 1635, Pereda was expelled from the court and began to take commissions from religious institutions.

== Works ==
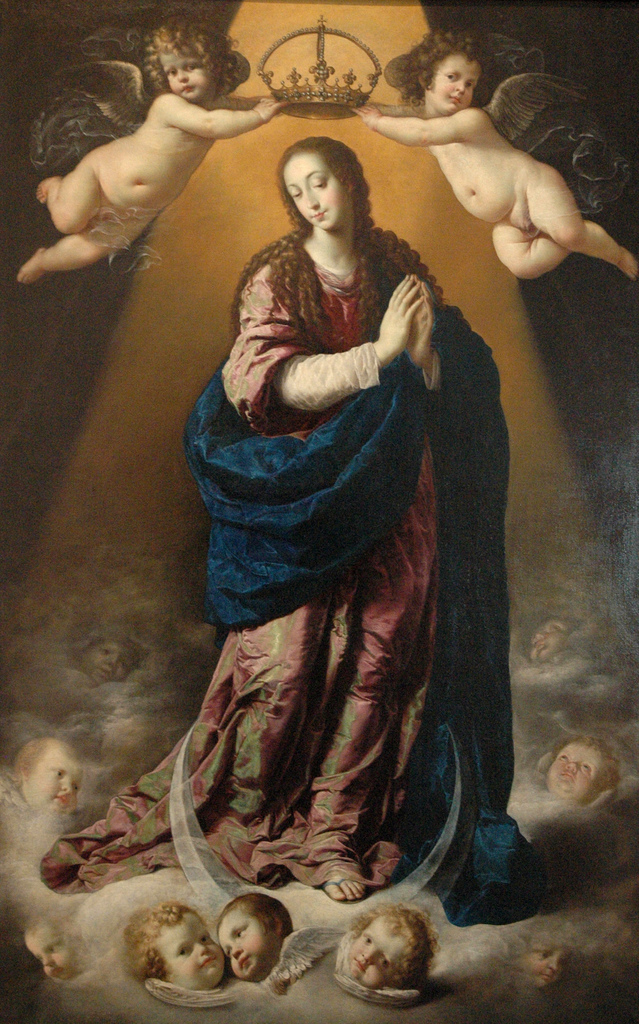
The Immaculate conception

- The Relief of Genoa (El Socorro a Génova), 1634
- Agila, 1635, painted for the collection of series of Gothic kings at the Palacio del Buen Retiro, Museo del Prado.
- Desengaño de la vida, around 1634
- Immaculate (Immaculada), several paintings now at several museums including the Prado (1636 painting), the Museo de Ponce, Puerto Rico (1654 painting), Hospital de la Venerable Orden Tercera in Madrid (1657 painting), Lyon, Budapest, etc.
- Annunciation, 1637, Prado
- Los desposorios de la Virgen con San José, 1640
- San Jerónimo penitente and San Pedro liberado por el ángel, 1643, Prado.
- Profesión de la infanta Margarita con San Agustín y la Virgen en gloria, 1650, Convento de la Encarnación, Madrid.
- Curación de Tobías, Barnard Castle, Bowes Museum, 1652.
- San José (Saint Joseph), Madrid, Royal Palace, 1654.
- El Salvador, 1655, now at the Capilla del Cristo and at San Ginés church, Madrid.
- Santo Domingo en Soriano (St. Dominic in Soriano), 1655, Museo Cerralbo.
- Elías y los profetas de Baal (Elijah and the Prophets of Baal), 1659, Madrid, parroquia del Carmen y San Luis
- The Sacrifice of Isaac, Dallas Museum of Art
- San Francisco de Asís en la Porciúncula (St. Francis of Assisi and the Porziuncola), 1664, Museo de Valladolid.
- San Jerónimo y la visión del Juicio Final, 1668, private collection.
- San Guillermo de Aquitania (St. William of Aquitaine), 1672, Real Academia de Bellas Artes de San Fernando.
- Several paintings of Bodegón including the Museo d'Arte Antiga, Lisbon, Helsinki (bodegón de frutas y bodegón de cocina) and The Pushkin Museum, Moscow (bodegón de legumbres, 1651).
- Vanitas, (versions at the Uffizi, Florence, where it has been attributed to Juan de Valdés Leal, and at the Museum of Fine Arts, Zaragoza), without date or signature, possibly corresponding to his final stage
- The Knight's Dream (El sueño del caballero), Museo de la Real Academia de Bellas Artes de San Fernando
- Canticle of Saint Simon, Musée Condé, Chantilly
- Saint Peter Repentant (San Pedro arrepentido), Museo de la Real Academia de Bellas Artes de San Fernando.

== Gallery ==
Antonio de Pereda's works

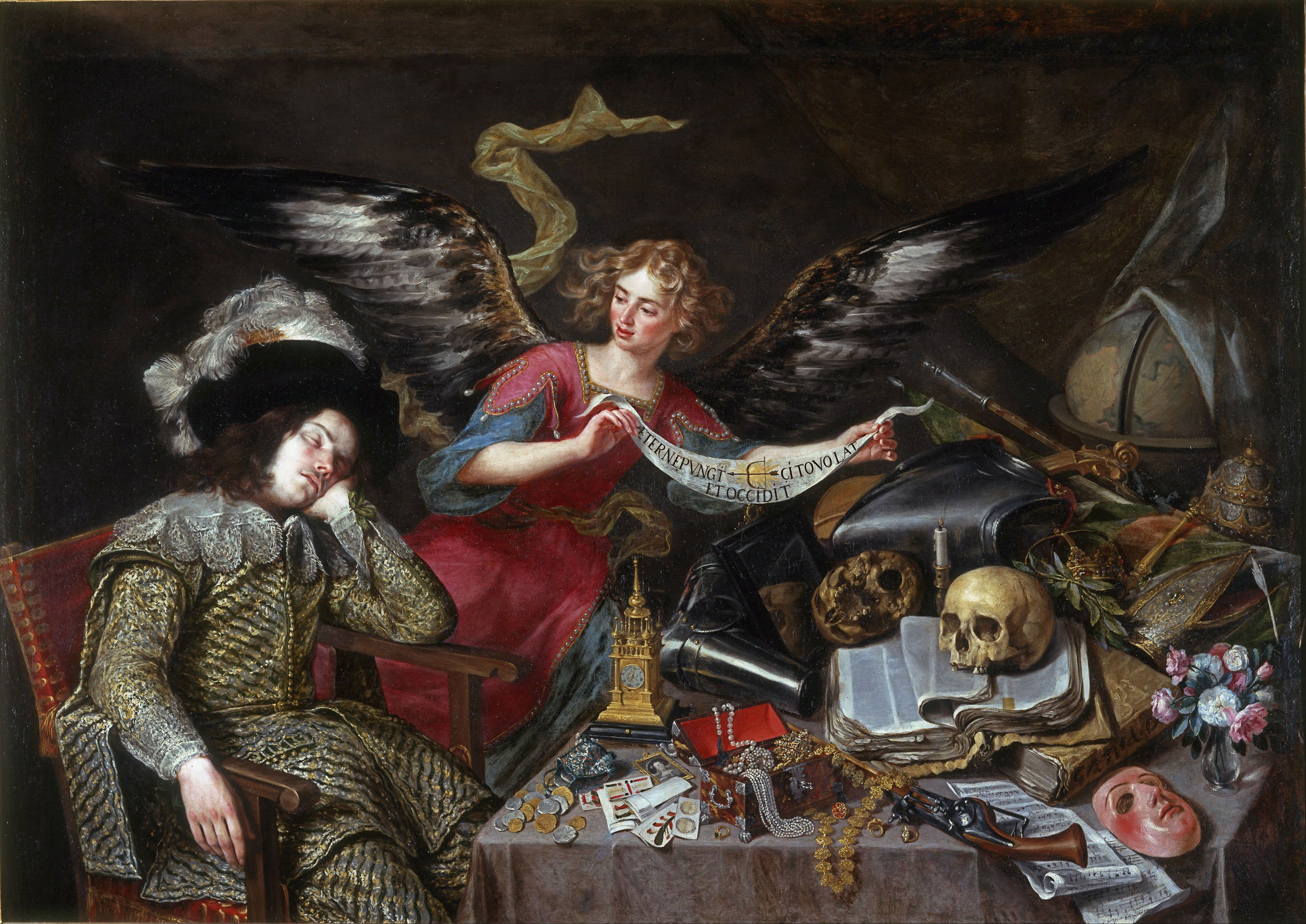
The Knight's Dream

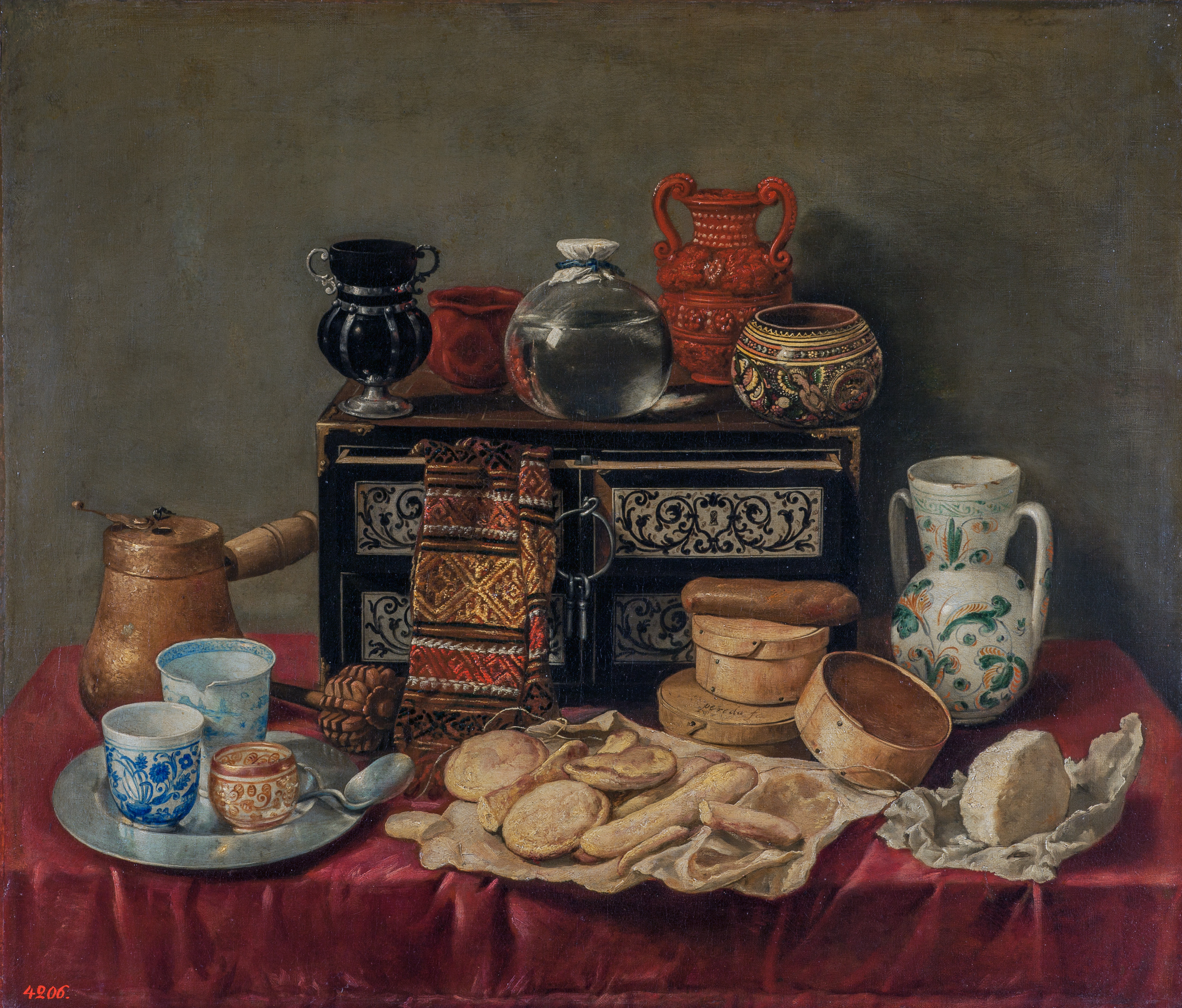
Still Life with an Ebony Chest

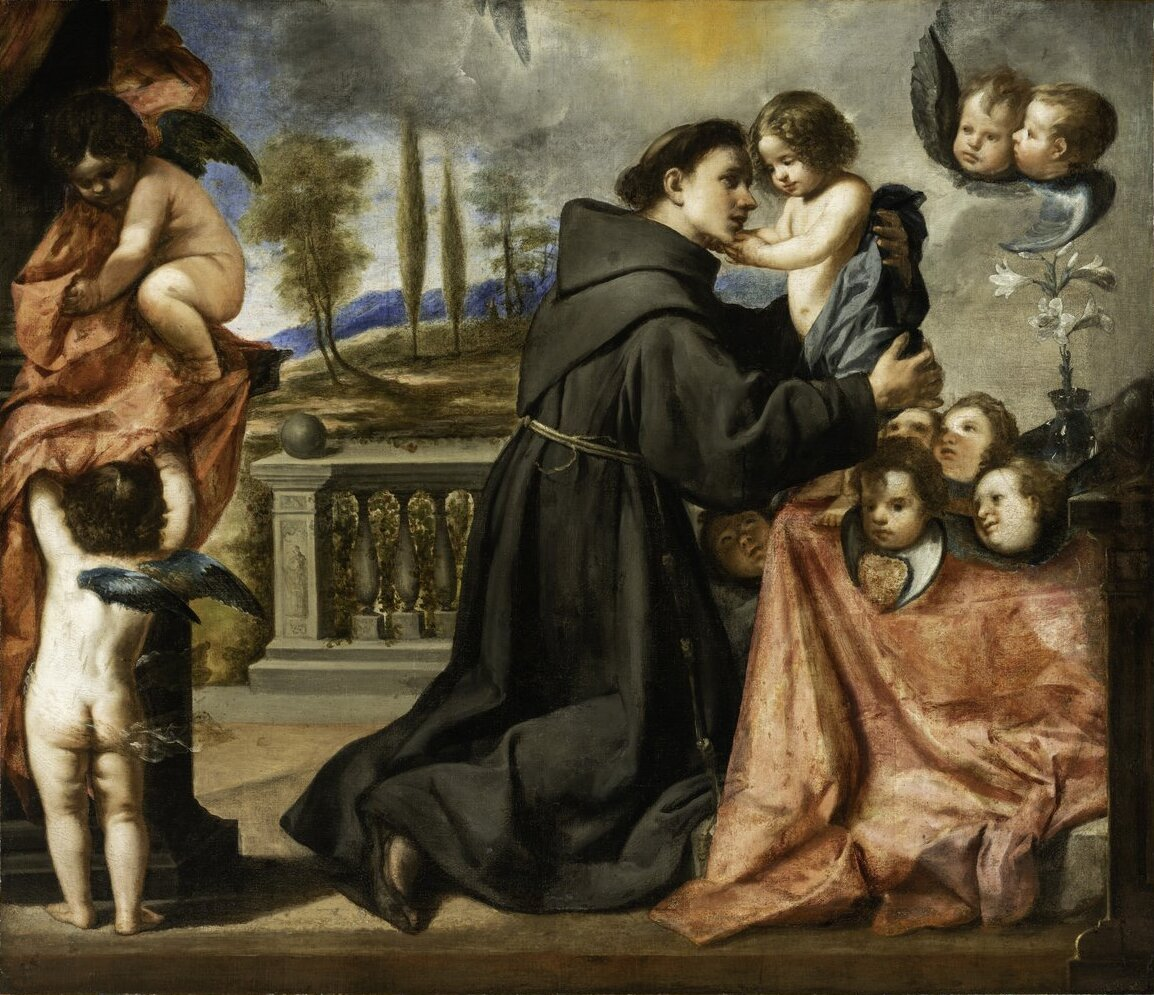
St Anthony of Padua with Christ Child

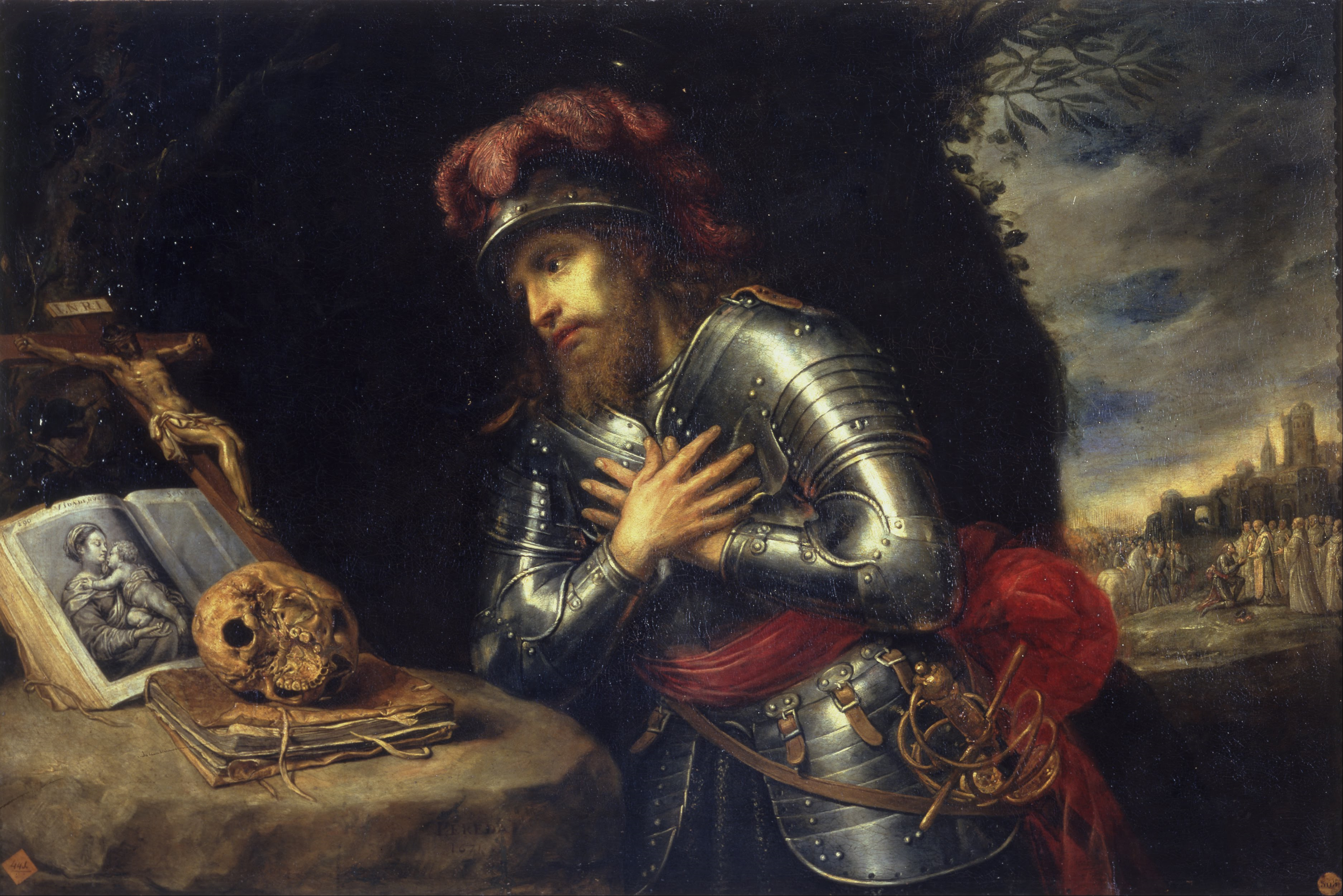
St William of Gellone

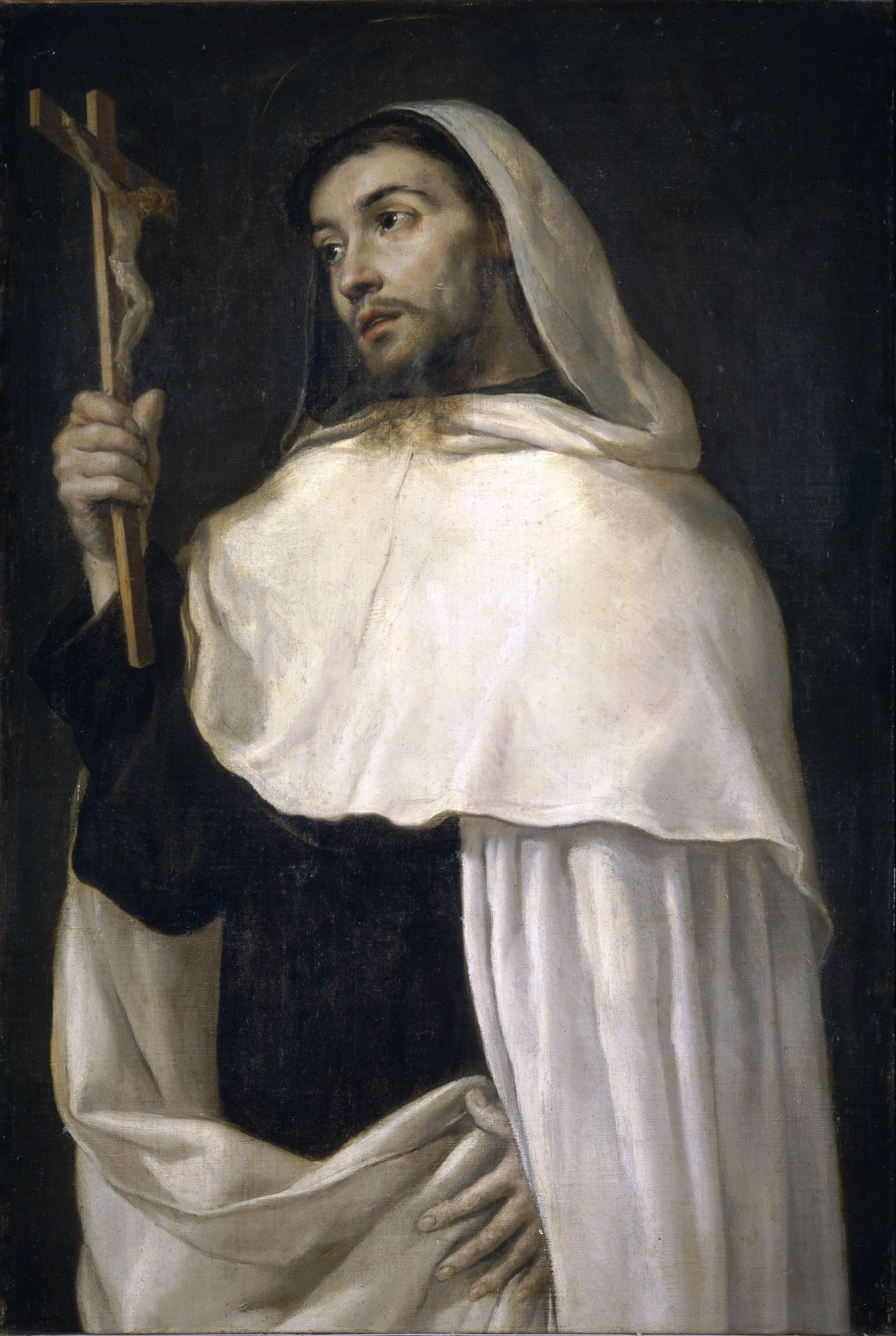
St Anthony of Padua

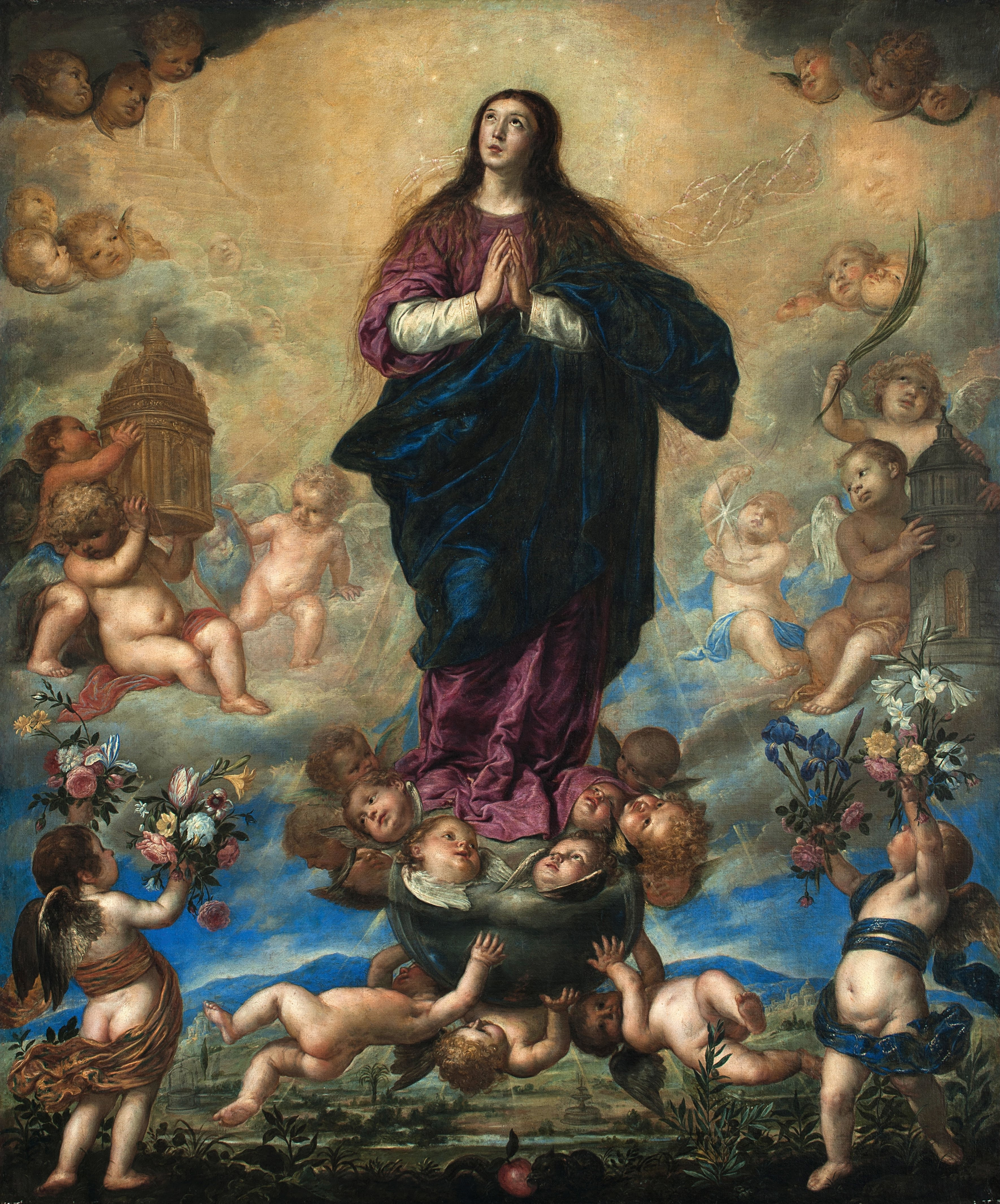
The Immaculate Conception
