= Andrés Marzo =

Spanish painter

Andrés Marzo (17th century) was a Spanish painter of the Baroque period.

Andrés was born in Valencia. He executed paintings of St. Anthony of Padua, one for the parish church of Santa Cruz, and another for that of Santa Catalina. He also designed the title page for a book, published in 1663, by Don Juan Bautista de Valda, describing the grand festival held in the city the year before, in celebration of a bull of Alexander VII, proclaiming the commonly revered Valencian doctrine of the Immaculate Conception.
