= Isidoro Arredondo =

Spanish painter

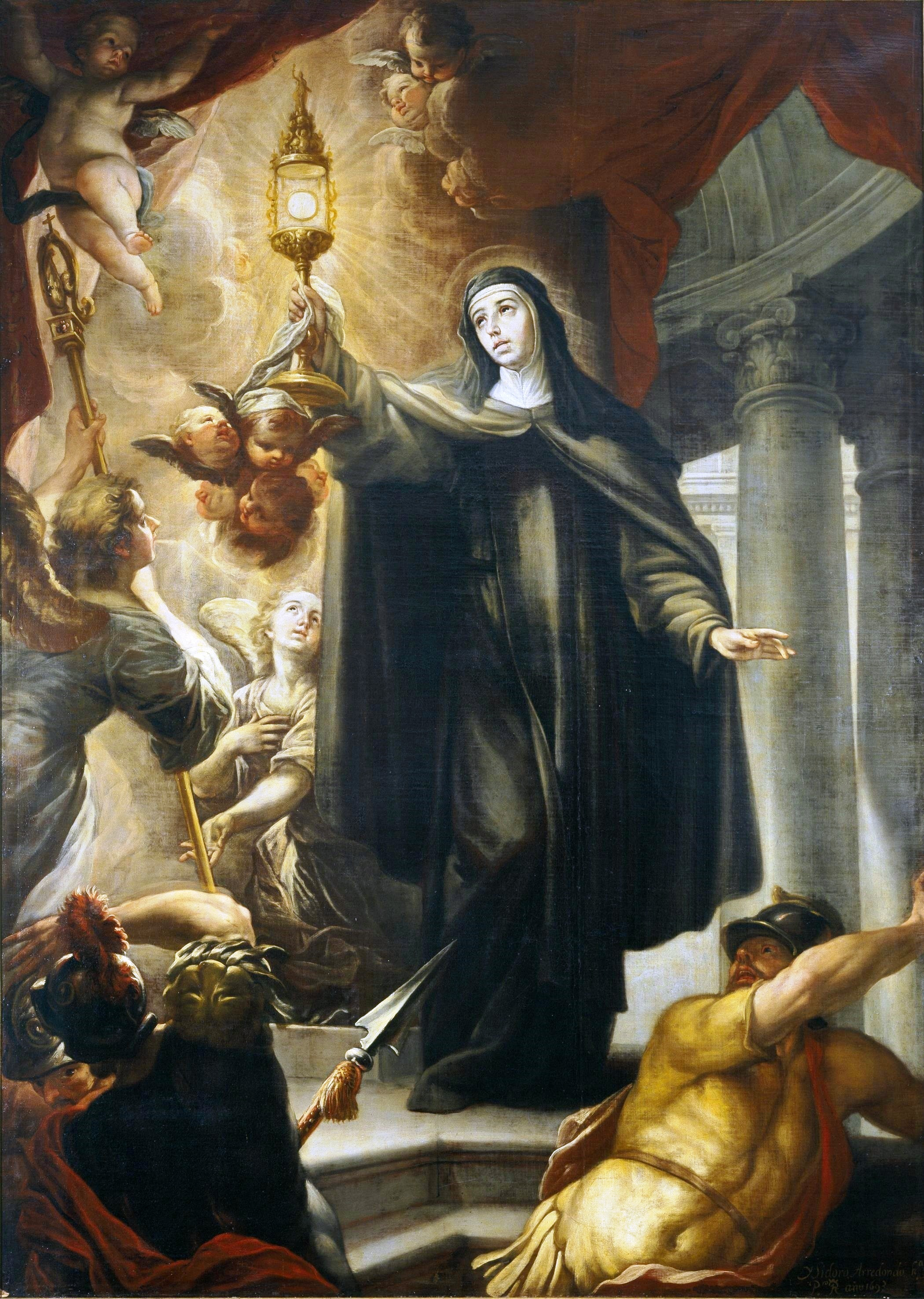
Santa Clara, 1693. Now in the Museo del Prado.

Isidoro Arredondo (1655–1702), an eminent Spanish painter, was born at Colmenar de Oreja, in 1653. He was first a scholar of José García Hidalgo, but he afterwards studied under Francisco Rizi. He painted history with much success, and on the death of Rizi, in 1685, he was appointed painter to Charles II of Spain. One of his principal works was a large picture of the 'Incarnation,' which Palomino mentions as a very grand composition along with Santa Clara (Saint Clare) (1693) and Santa Gertrudis (Saint Gertrude). He painted much in oil and fresco in the churches and palaces, and the ' 'Legend of Cupid and Psyche,' in the royal palace, is considered one of his best works. He died at Madrid in 1702.
