= Andrea Ramirez (painter) =

Spanish painter

Andrea Ramirez was a Spanish painter who also prescribed manuscripts.
