= Fernando Márquez Joya =

Spanish painter

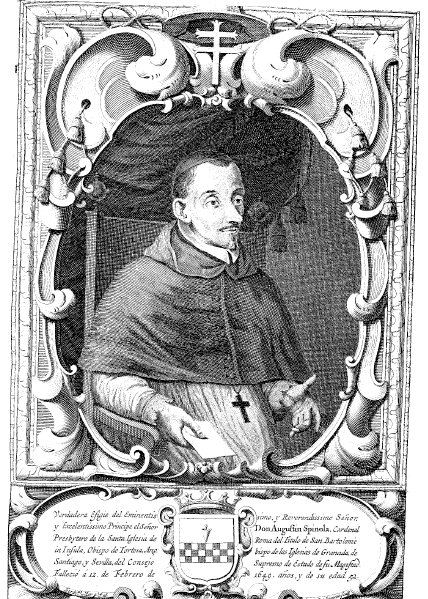
Picture of cardinal Agustín Spínola; burin by William van der Gouwen on drawing by Fernando Márquez Joya. Gabriel de Aranda, Inmortal memoria del ... Señor Don Agustín Spínola, printed by Tomás López de Haro in Sevilla, 1683.

Fernando Márquez Joya (17th century) was a Spanish late-Baroque painter. His dates of birth and death are not known.

Not much is known of his life. He is known to have studied under Pedro Nuñez de Villavicencio. He primarily painted religious-themed works for regional churches on commission. His style reflected an influence of Bartolomé Esteban Murillo.
