= Angelo Nardi =

Italian painter

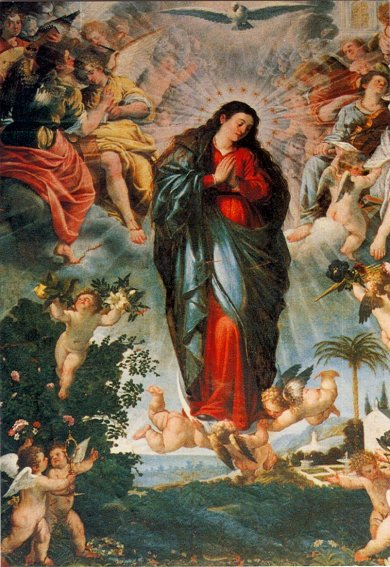
Immaculate Conception (1619–1620). Convento de las Bernardas, Alcalá de Henares

Angelo Nardi da Razzo (19 February 1584 – 1664) was an Italian painter of the early Baroque period; active primarily in Spain.

== Biography ==
He was born in Vaglia to a noble Florentine family that had been dispossessed of their assets and banished by the Medicis. His artistic formation probably took place in a circle of painters that included major figures of the Counter-Reformation such as Ludovico Cigoli, Domenico Passignano and Gregorio Pagani.

From approximately 1600 to 1607, he lived in Venice. After that time, he established himself in Madrid. By 1615, he had been commissioned to paint a series of works celebrating a meeting of Spanish and French royalty in Irun. Those paintings were destroyed in a fire at the Royal Alcázar of Madrid in 1734. Between 1619 and 1620, he executed a series of works for the Convento de las Bernardas in Alcalá de Henares, occasioned by the recent death of its founder, Bernardo de Sandoval y Rojas. These are considered to be the first works of his artistic maturity.

At the same time, records show that he was employed as the manager of workshop belonging to Marcos de Aguilera. Following Aguilera's death in 1620, he took over the studio and, in 1623, married his thirteen-year-old daughter. This is believed to have been a "marriage of convenience" and he had it annulled in 1625. Marcos' son, Lorenzo, filed suit against Nardi, but it was dismissed. Shortly after, he received the largely honorary (unpaid) position of Painter to the King.

The death of Bartolomé González in 1627 left an opening for court painter, which Nardi finally obtained in 1631, despite some very serious competition. Among his competitors was Diego Velázquez, who was awarded a similar post. Over the years, they developed a friendly working relationship. Nardi would act as a character witness in favor of Velázquez when he was being considered for the Order of Santiago. With his economic situation secured, he devoted some time to doing works for religious communities. Later, he would win his fellow painters an exemption from the alcabala; a type of sales tax.

He died in Madrid and was interred at the Church of the Misericordia, which was destroyed during the Spanish Civil War. A street in Vaglia bears his name.

== Selected works ==
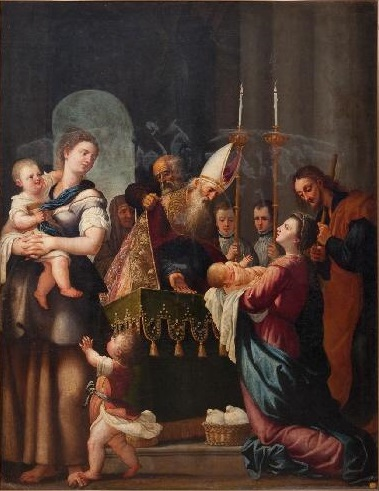
Presentation of Jesus in the Temple. Museo del Prado

- Crucifixión (Carmelite order, Alcalá de Henares)
- Escenas de la Vida de Santa Teresa de Jesús (Carmelite order)
- Decorations of frescoes at the Chapel of the Conception, La Guardia (c. 1630)
- Noli me tangere (1639, Getafe)
- Escenas de la Vida de la Magdalena (1639, Alcalá de Henares archives)
- San Jerónimo (Saint Jerome) (Biblioteca Museu Víctor Balaguer)
- San José con el Niño y san Juanito (Museo del Prado)
- Presentación de Jesús en el Templo (Museo de Prado, Huesca)
- Retablo de las Claras (1647, Alcalá de Henares)
- Adoración de los Pastores (Adoration of the Shepherds) (1650, private collection)

== Sources ==
- Antonio Palomino, An account of the lives and works of the most eminent Spanish painters, sculptors and architects, 1724, first English translation, 1739, p. 37
- Stirling-Maxwell, William (1891). Annals of the Artists of Spain (Volume II). London: John C. Nimmo. pp. 563–4.
- Angulo Íñiguez, Diego and Pérez Sánchez, Alfonso, E., Pintura madrileña. Primer tercio del siglo XVII (Madrilene Painters), Madrid, Instituto Diego Velázquez, 1969, p. 271-298.
- Pérez Sánchez, Alfonso E., Borgianni, Cavarozzi y Nardi en España (Borgianni, Cavarozzi and Nardi in Spain), Madrid, Instituto Diego Velázquez, CSIC, 1964, p. 25.
