= Patricio Caxés =

Italian painter

Frontispice of the Spanish edition of The Five Orders of Architecture by Vignola, engraved by Caxés.

Patricio Caxés, Caxesi, or Caxete, (died 1612) was an Italian painter who primarily lived and worked in Spain. His exact date of birth is not known.

Caxés was a native of Arezzo. It is not known by whom he was instructed, but he became an artist of sufficient celebrity to be invited to Spain by Philip II, who employed him in the palaces of Madrid. He was commanded to paint the gallery of the queen in the Palace of the Pardo, on which occasion he made choice of the very inappropriate subject of the 'Chastity of Joseph.' It was destroyed with many other valuable works of art in the burning of that palace. Caxés translated into Spanish Vignola's 'Five Orders of Architecture,' for which he engraved the frontispiece and plates. Caxés, after serving Philip II and Philip III during forty-four years, died at Madrid in extreme poverty, at an advanced age, in 1612. The king being informed of the state of destitution in which he had left his widow and eight children, munificently assigned to them five-pence a day for one year. One of his sons Eugenio Caxés became a painter who also worked for Philip III.
