= Juan Agustín Ceán Bermúdez =

Spanish writer on art

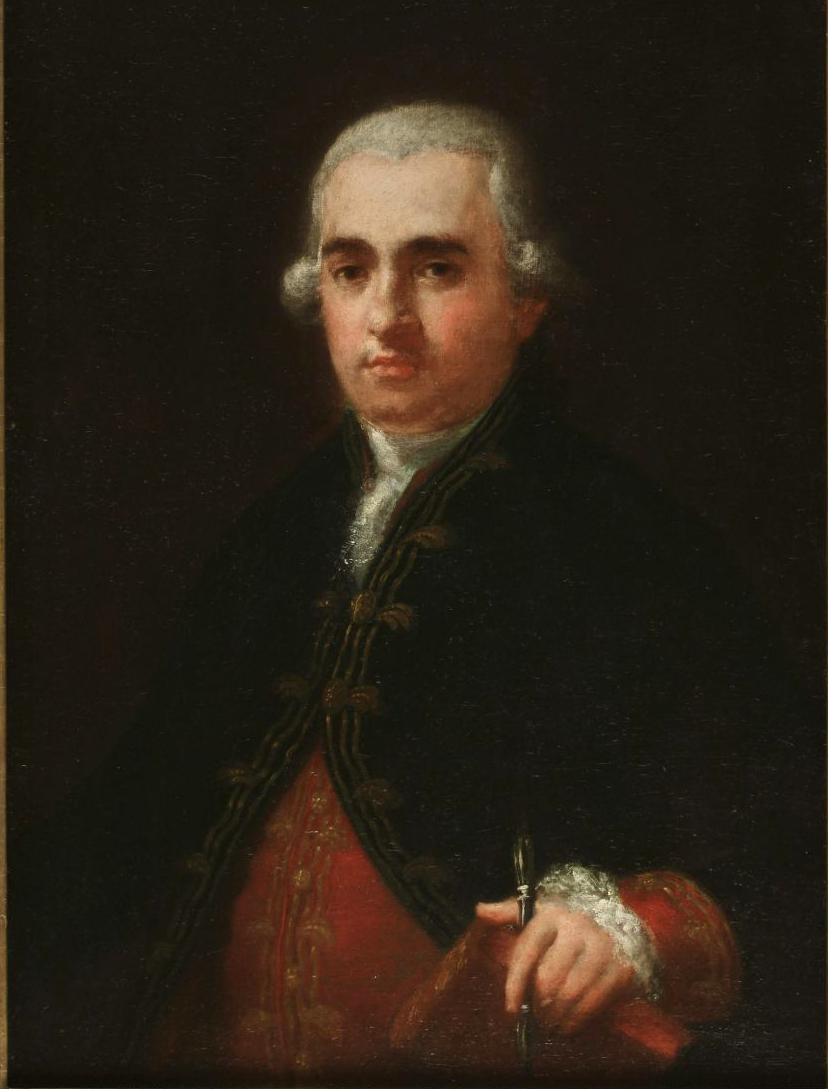
Retrato de J. A. Ceán Bermúdez (Goya, 1785)

Juan Agustín Ceán Bermúdez (17 September 1749 in Gijón, Spain – 3 December 1829 in Madrid, Spain) was a Spanish writer on art.

== Biography ==
Bermúdez was born in Gijón, Asturias. He founded an art academy at Seville, and was given responsibility to order the Archivo General de Indias or the repository of documents relating to the Colonies. He later made secretary of the Council for Indian Affairs in Madrid, a post later lost. He put himself in the service of the statesman and author Jovellanos and wrote his master's biography; Jovellanos then helped pay for his artistic studies and placed him in a government position. He is best known as the author of the Diccionario Historico, a biographical dictionary of the principal artists of Spain. He was also a friend of Goya.

== Works ==
- Diccionario historico de los mas ilustres profesores de las Bellas Artes de Espana (Madr. 1800, 6 Vols.)
- Descripcion artistica de la catedral de Sevilla (Sevilla 1804)
- Carta sobre el estilo y gusto en la pintura de la escuela sevillana (Cadiz 1806)
- Memorias para la vita del G. M. de Jovellanos (Madr. 1814)
- Dialogo sobre el arte de la pintura (Sevilla 1819)
- Noticias de los arquitectos y arquitectura de Espana (Madr. 1829, 4 Vols.)
- Sumario de las antiguedades romanas, que hay en Espana (Madr. 1832, posthumous)

== Internet ==
- Arte Espanol: Proyecto Diccionario Cean Bermudez. 2006. http://www.ceanbermudez.es
- Juan Agustín Ceán Bermúdez on arthistoricum.net
