= Juan de las Roelas =

Spanish painter

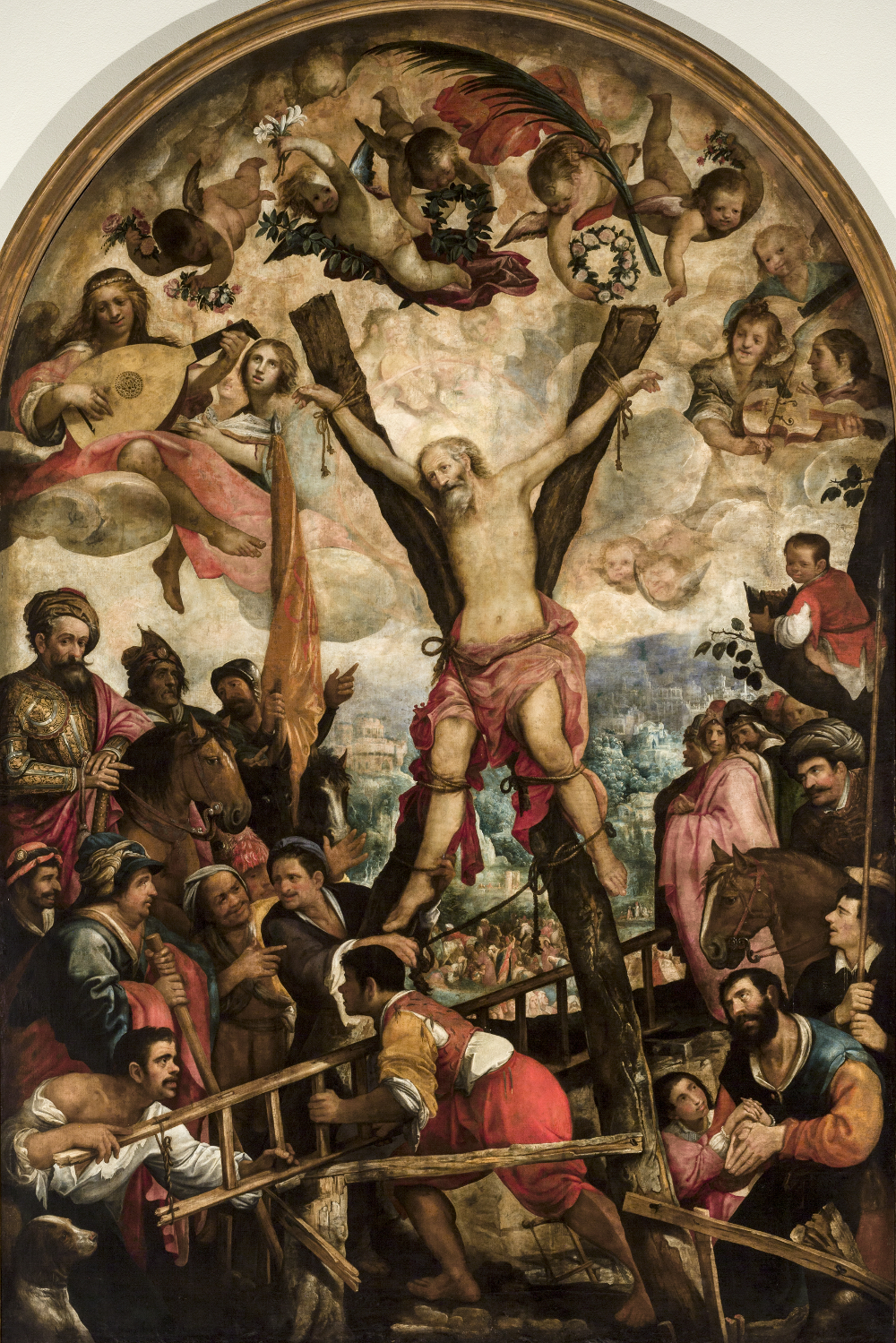
Martyrdom of Saint Andrew, Museum of Fine Arts of Seville

Juan de Roelas, de las Roelas or Ruela (c. 1570, in Flanders – 1625, in Olivares) was a Flemish painter whose entire documented career took place in Spain. He played a major role in the transition from Mannerist to Baroque painting in Spain.

== Life ==
Details about the life of the artist are scarce and largely uncertain. Accepted opinion about his life, including his birth in Seville, was overturned in the year 2000 when a Spanish scholar demonstrated that early biographers had mixed up the painter with a contemporary Carmelite canon with the same name who was a native of Seville. The revised view is that the painter Juan de Roelas was not a native of Seville, but was a native of Flanders. The documentary evidence for this was found in two notarial documents which show the presence of a Flemish painter named Juan de Flandes, along with his father, in Valladolid in 1594 (the accepted opinion placed the painter's presence in this city at a later date, somewhere from 1598 to 1602). In the first document (relating to a loan repayment) Juan and his father declare themselves to be painters from Flanders. This has led to the conclusion that Juan de Roelas was Flemish by birth and not a native of Seville. This view is further supported by the fact that Juan de Roelas was later given the commission to paint the Martyrdom of Saint Andrew for the Chapel of the Flemish in the Saint Thomas Church in Seville (now at the Museum of Fine Arts of Seville). Saint Andrew was at the time the patron saint of Flanders. A Flemish background also offers an explanation for the stylistic characteristics of de Roelas' work which had been explained traditionally by a presumed trip to Venice and an apprenticeship with a follower of Titian.

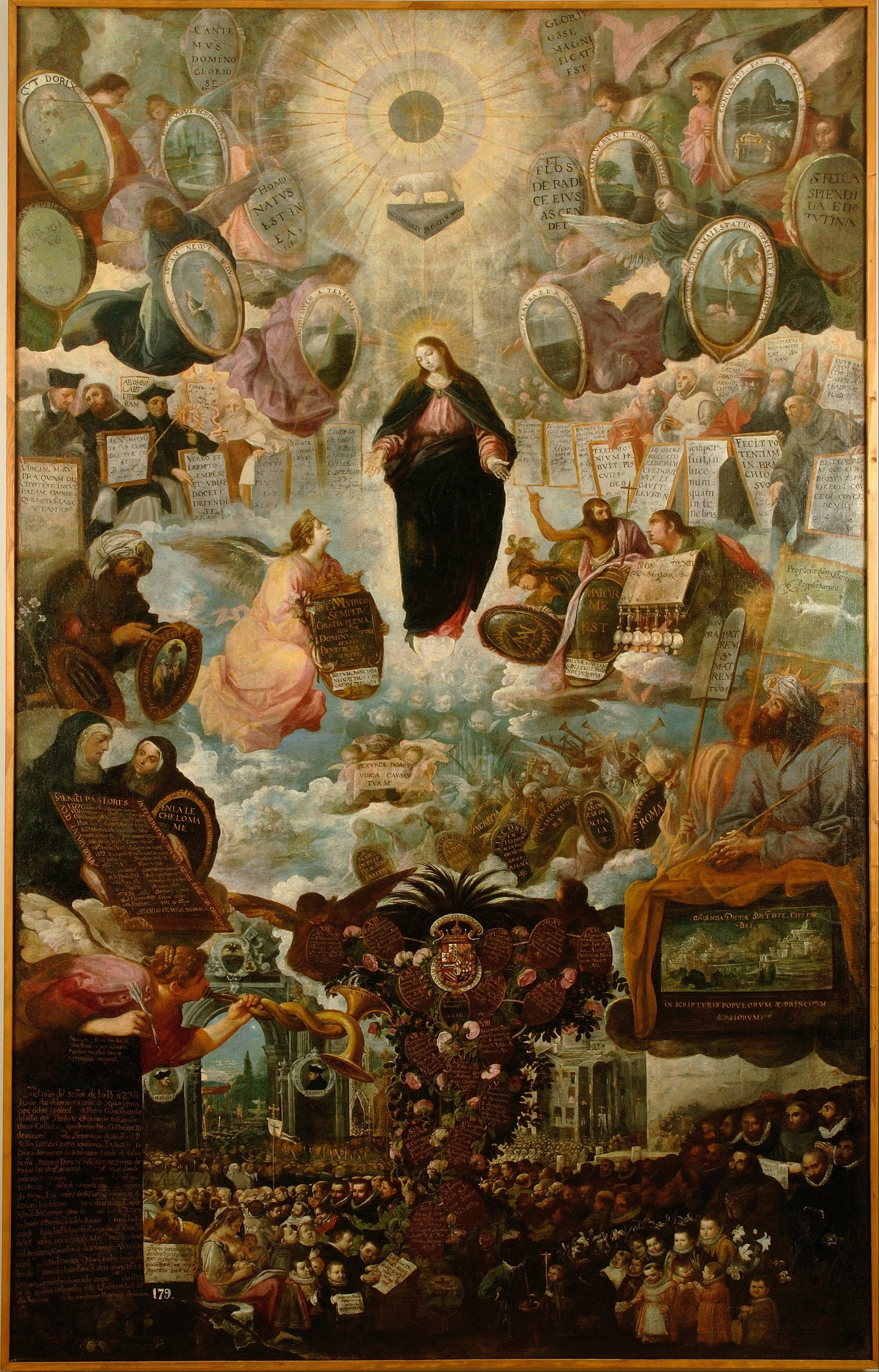
Allegory of the Immaculate Conception, National Sculpture Museum in Valladolid

The new findings about the prior mix-up of the biographical details of the painter with those of a Spanish monk and the lack of other documentation have made it difficult to separate and confirm the details of his life.

It is known that in 1598 he worked in Valladolid in the commemorative ceremonies for the death of king Philip II of Spain, contributing to the design of his funerary monument. He remained there until 1604, when he obtained a benefice or favour from the Count-Duke of Olivares. In the village of, Olivares, near Seville, de Roelas made several large paintings to decorate altars in and around Seville. It is reported that he moved to Madrid where he tried to obtain an appointment as painter to the royal court, but that when he failed he returned to Olivares where he died in 1625.

He had many disciples, among whom Francisco Varela from Seville and Pablo Legote from Luxembourg.

== Work ==
Juan de Roelas is now regarded as a pivotal artist in the evolution of the history of painting in Seville, especially in the years prior to the appearance of Zurbarán, Cano, Herrera, de Castillo, Murillo and Leal.

The latter two artists in particular were influenced by de Roelas, both in terms of iconography and composition as well as technique. Above all, his fundamental influence lies in the assimilation of Baroque naturalism which would emerge fully with Murillo and would be one of the constants of Seville Baroque painting.

De Roelas contributed to Sevilian painting of the early 17th century what was formerly interpreted as the expressive and technical aspects of the Venetian art of Titian and Veronese, causing his paintings to be considered Italianate in their variegated and theatrical compositions, their richness and warmth of colour ranges, the use of broad and bold brushstrokes and their unusual size. In light of recent scholarship, however, scholarly consensus is that Roelas' oeuvre is better understood in the context of Flemish painting than in the supposed influence of the Venetian school.

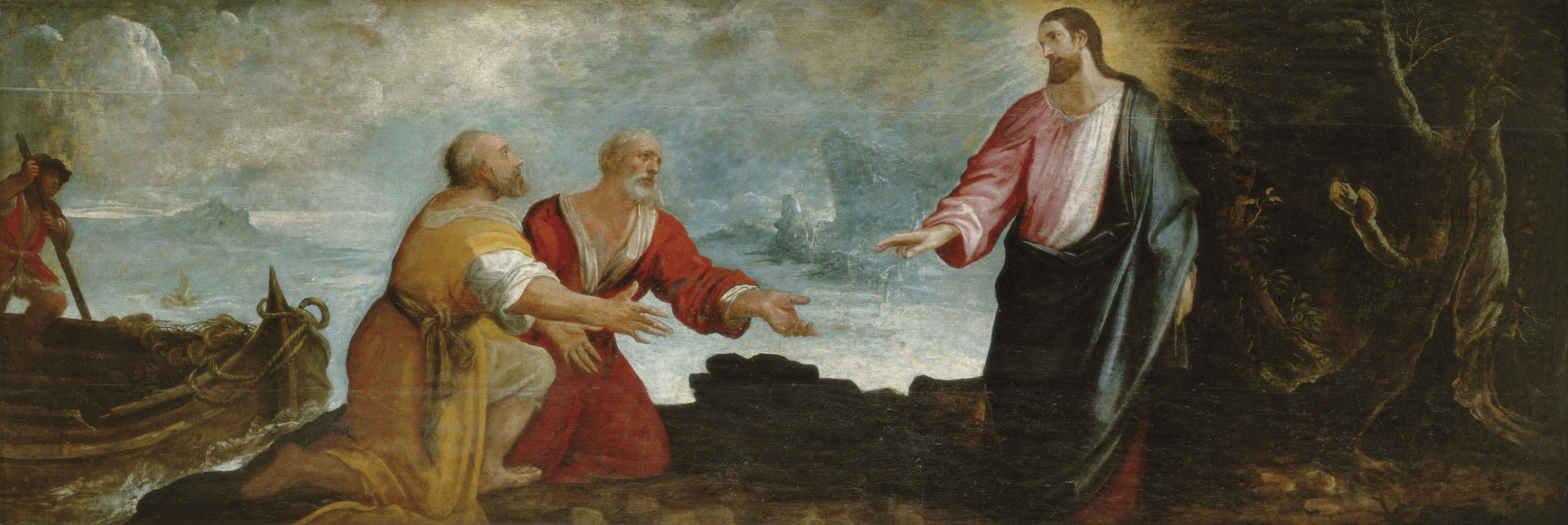
The calling of St Peter and St Andrew, Bilbao Fine Arts Museum

Trained in the style of late Mannerism, de Roelas introduced light effects that are similar to those of Jacopo Bassano. He was particularly adept at depicting everyday life, completing his compositions on sacred themes with vulgar elements of daily life. This aspect of his art was criticised by some contemporary painters such as Francisco Pacheco. Through its interest in the study of nature, de Roelas's work forms a transition from the artificiality of Mannerism to the naturalistic realism of Spanish Baroque.

He popularized the use of a particular format of altarpiece which was divided into two juxtaposed halves, the upper half depicting the divine world, and the bottom half representing the underworld. This division is typically Mannerist, and had already been used successfully by El Greco. This division of the canvas was very successful in Andalusia.

Roelas' paintings are very numerous in Seville. His masterpieces include Martyrdom of St. Andrew and El Transito de San Isidoro (Death of St. Isidore), an altarpiece residing in the Church of San Isidore; another of his finest works is the painting Santiago at the Battle of Clavijo, hung in the Chapel of Santiago in Seville Cathedral, which represents the saint riding victoriously over the Moors. Cean Bermudez praised it for its force and grandeur. The writer Richard Ford, well-versed in Spanish art, was especially impressed by the picture of the Conception (Concepción), in the Academy, and by three in the chapel of the University at Seville. Roelas has been compared to Tintoretto and Carracci, and is ranked among the best of the Andalusian painters. He excelled in design and composition, and his work displayed a grandeur of form and character common to the great masters of painting.
