= Legot =

Legot (pronounced [ləɡo]) is a French language surname, of Luxembourgian and Belgian origins. It may refer to:

- Marguerite Legot (1913–1977), Belgian minister of State
- Pablo Legot (1598–1671), Spanish painter, who was born in Luxembourg
