= Eugenio Lucas Villaamil =

Spanish painter (1858–1918)

Eugenio Lucas Villaamil, sometimes called "The Younger" (14 January 1858 – 23 January 1918) was a Spanish costumbrista painter. Many of his works were painted in the style of Francisco de Goya; and the attributions are sometimes confused.

== Biography ==
He was born in Madrid. Although the circumstances surrounding his identity and legitimacy were once quite uncertain, it is now agreed that he was the legitimate son of the painter, Eugenio Lucas Velázquez and his wife, Francisca, the youngest sister of Jenaro Pérez Villaamil. His first art lessons were in his father's studio and his formal studies were at the "Escuela Especial de Pintura de Madrid". He made his début at the National Exhibition of Fine Arts shortly after graduating.

His paintings always showed the influence of his father. He specialized in Aragonese themes; notably in his bullfight scenes which were often very ornate. Traditional costumbrista scenes of Madrid, featuring colorful majas and chisperos, were also one of his fortes and were very popular. Many of his early works were 18th century tableaus.

He made copies of many of Goya's paintings, from the Museo del Prado and the private collection of José Lázaro Galdiano. He also painted frescoes in Galdiano's home, which is now a museum. In addition, he was popular as a portrait painter among the bourgeoisie and, in contrast to his costumbrista works, also provided them with scenes from high society; often with a Parisian flavor.

Despite his popularity and his being awarded the Order of Charles III, he never quite emerged from the shadow of his father. In fact, some of his works were mistakenly attributed to his father and are still in the process of being properly identified. He died in Madrid, aged 60.

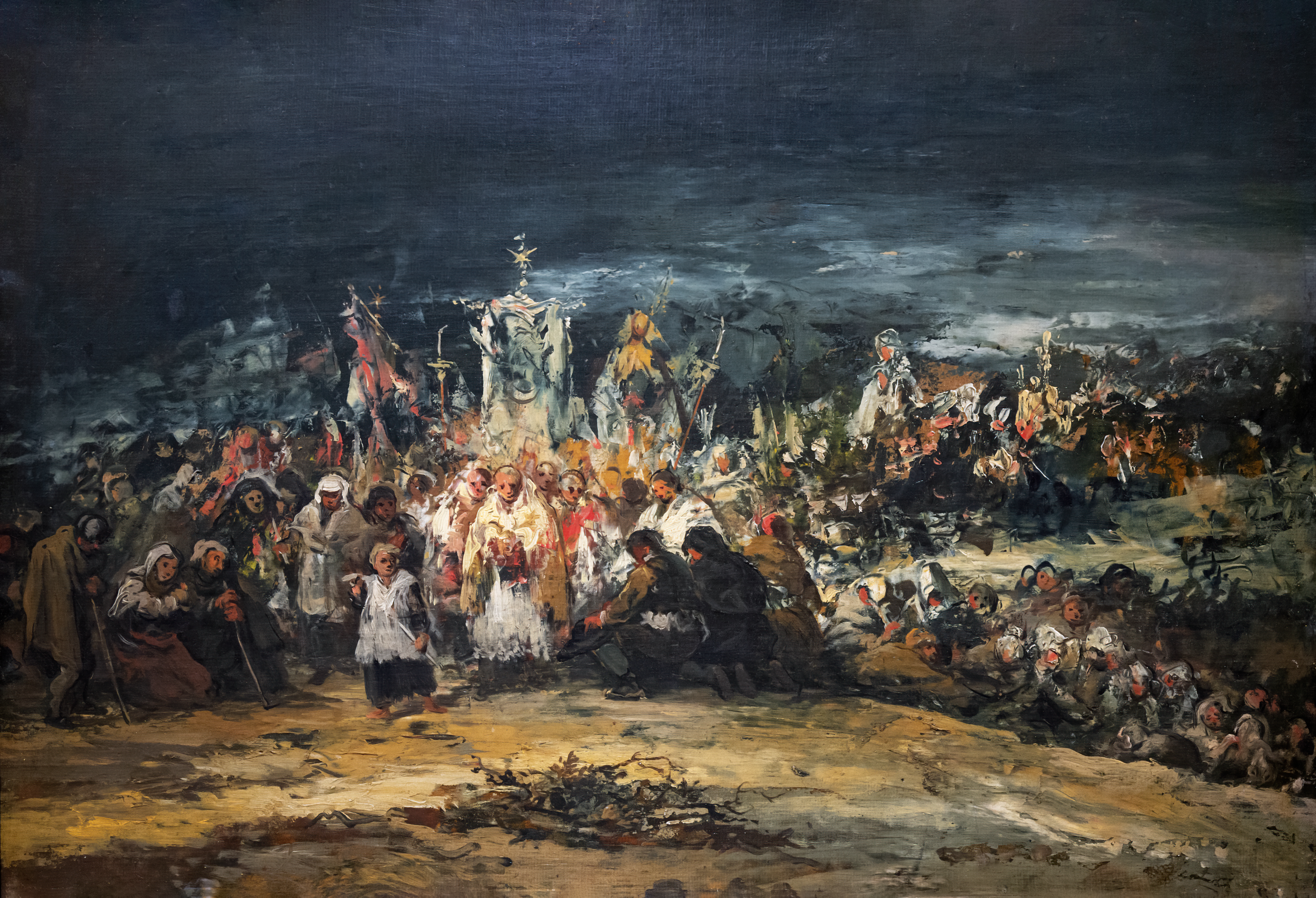
The procession - Musée du Louvre

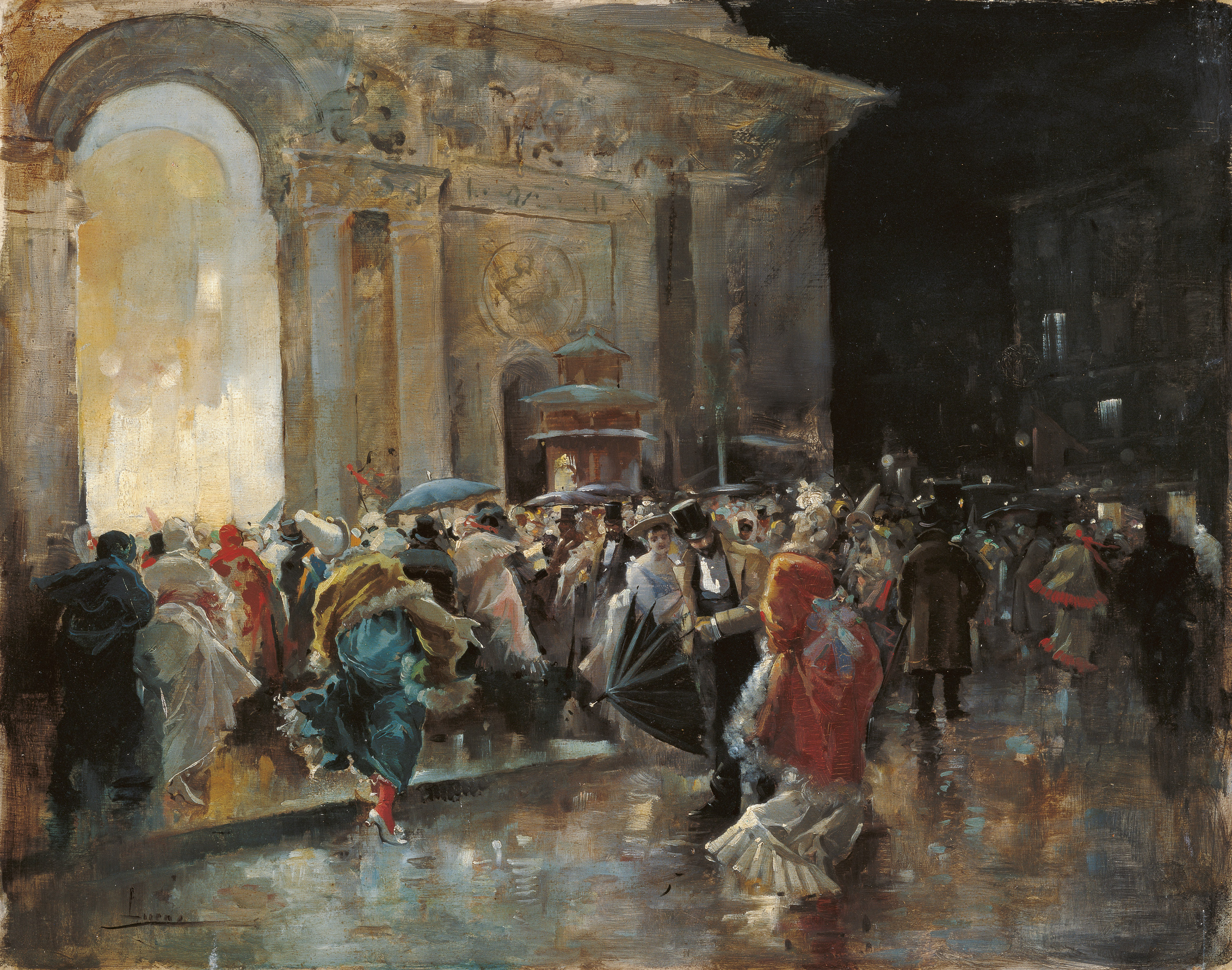
Arriving at the Theater for the Masked Ball

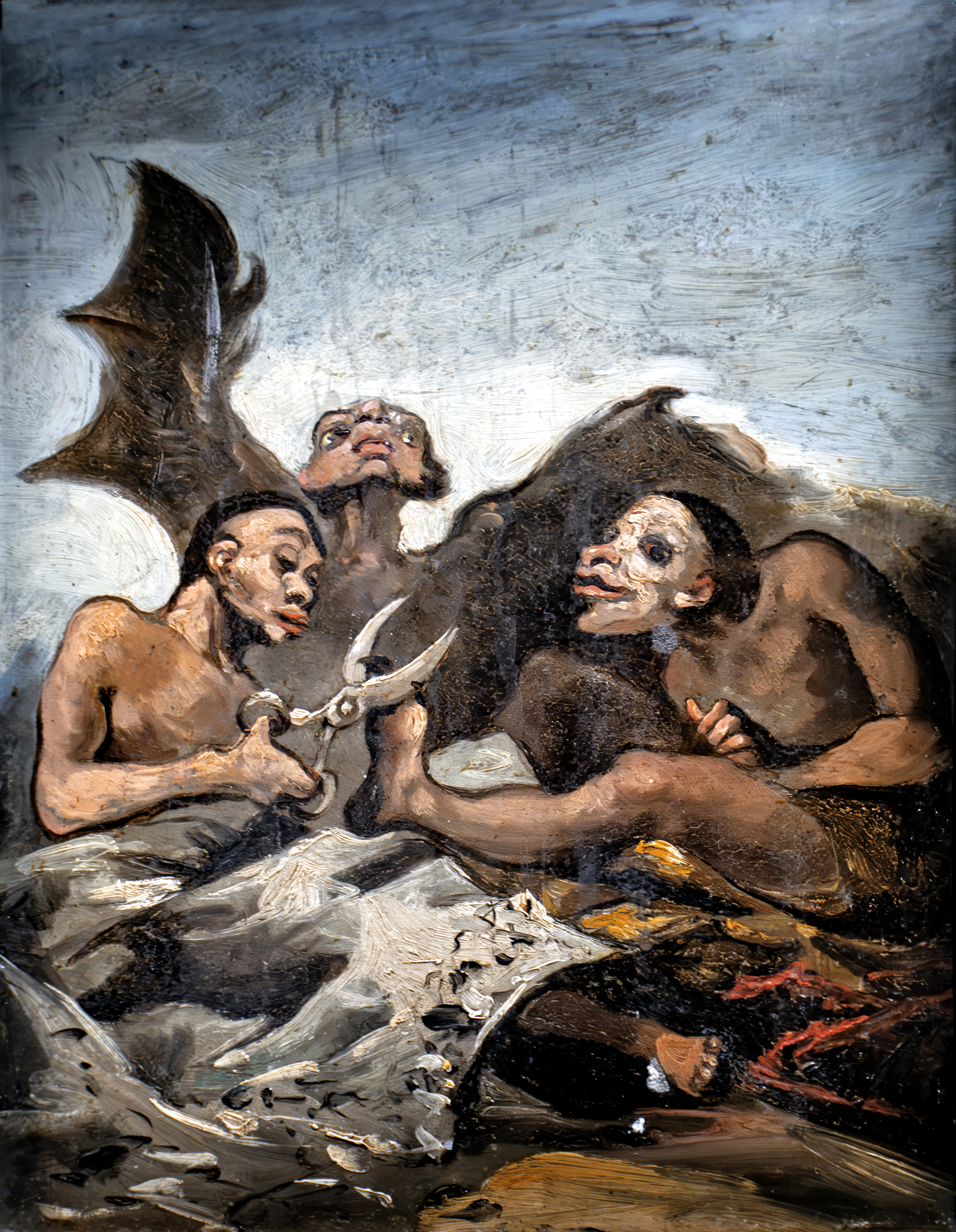
Caprices No. 51 after Goya - Goya Museum

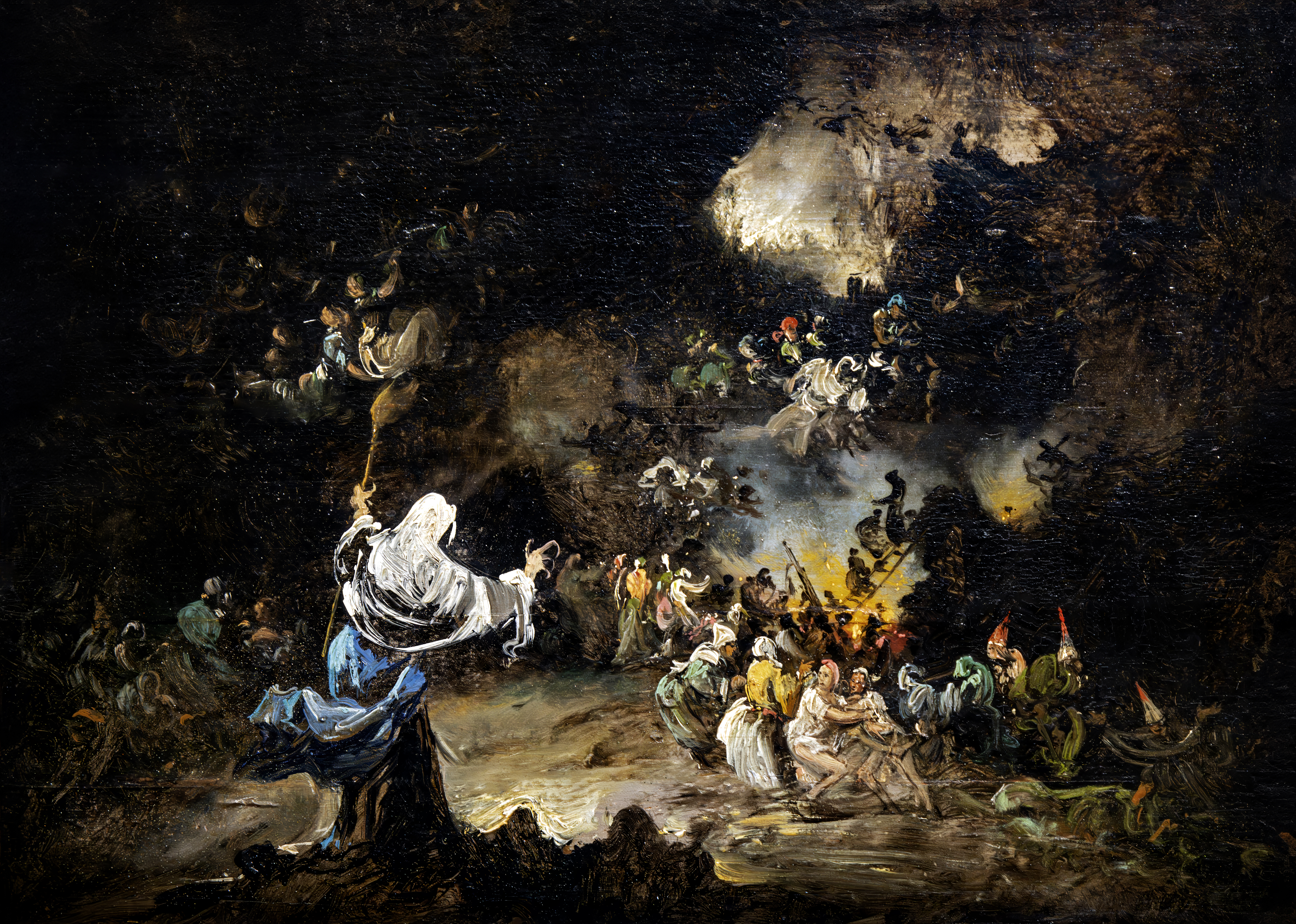
The Sabbath - Goya Museum
