= Bernabé de Ayala =

Spanish painter

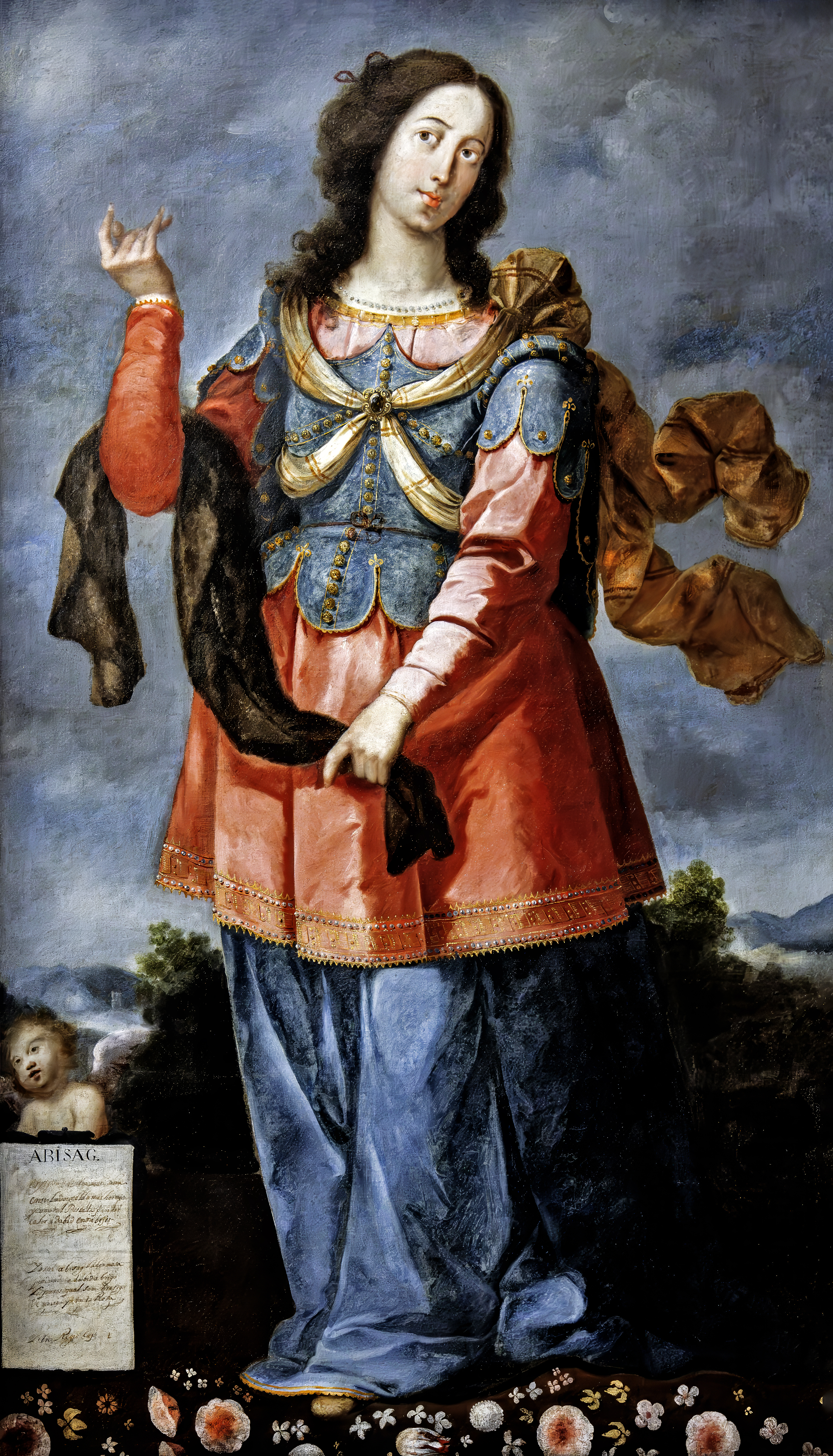
Abisag the young Sunamite by Bernabé de Ayala, Goya Museum

Bernabé de Ayala (1625-1689) was a Spanish painter.

== Life ==
He was born at Jerez de la Frontera in the beginning of the 17th century, studied under Zurbarán and imitated his manner in his tints and draperies. No doubt many of his pictures are now mistaken for the work of his master. He was one of the founders of the Academy at Seville in 1660, and was a member of it until 1671; but as his name does not appear with the subscribers to the statutes in 1673, it is supposed that his death occurred between those years. The Museum of Seville has six of his works, and there are others in the churches of that city and of Madrid.
