= Sebastián de Llanos y Valdés =

Spanish Baroque painter (c.1605–1677)

Sebastián de Llanos y Valdís (c. 1605–1677) was a Spanish painter of the Baroque period, mainly active in Seville.

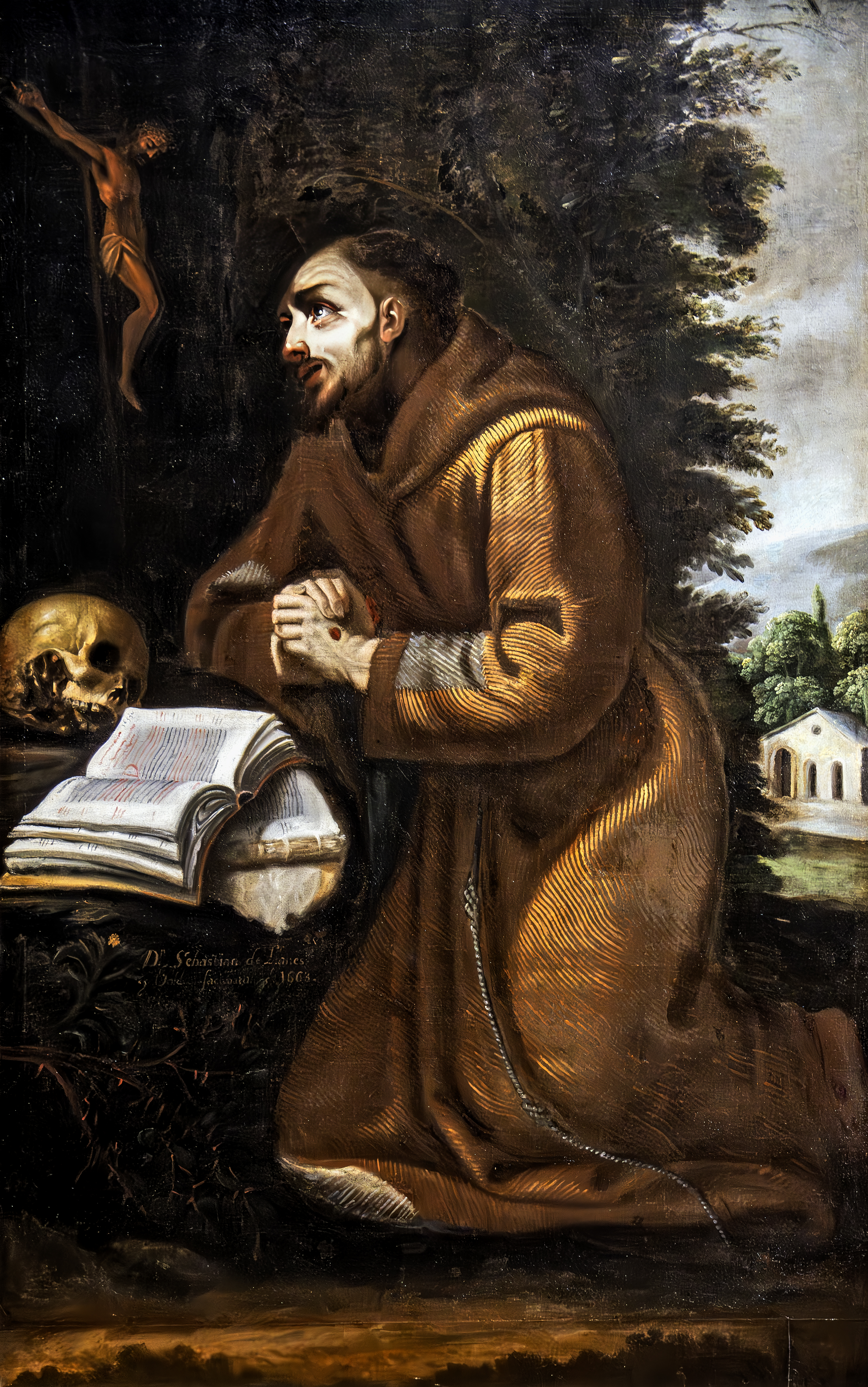
Saint Francis of Assisi in prayer Goya Museum

He was born at Seville. He was a pupil of Francisco Herrera the Elder, and worked chiefly for private patrons. In 1660, he actively supported Bartolomé Esteban Murillo in founding the Academia de Bellas Artes (Academy of Art), afterwards making frequent donations of oil and other materials for the students' use. He was thrice chosen president of the Academy, in 1666 and the two following years. He painted a Virgin of the Rosary, adored by Angels and patrons for the College of San Tomas at Seville, and a Magdalen for the Convent Recoletas in Madrid. Llanos is chiefly remarkable for having worked under the despotic Herrera longer than any other of his scholars, and for being wounded in a duel by the turbulent Alonso Cano.

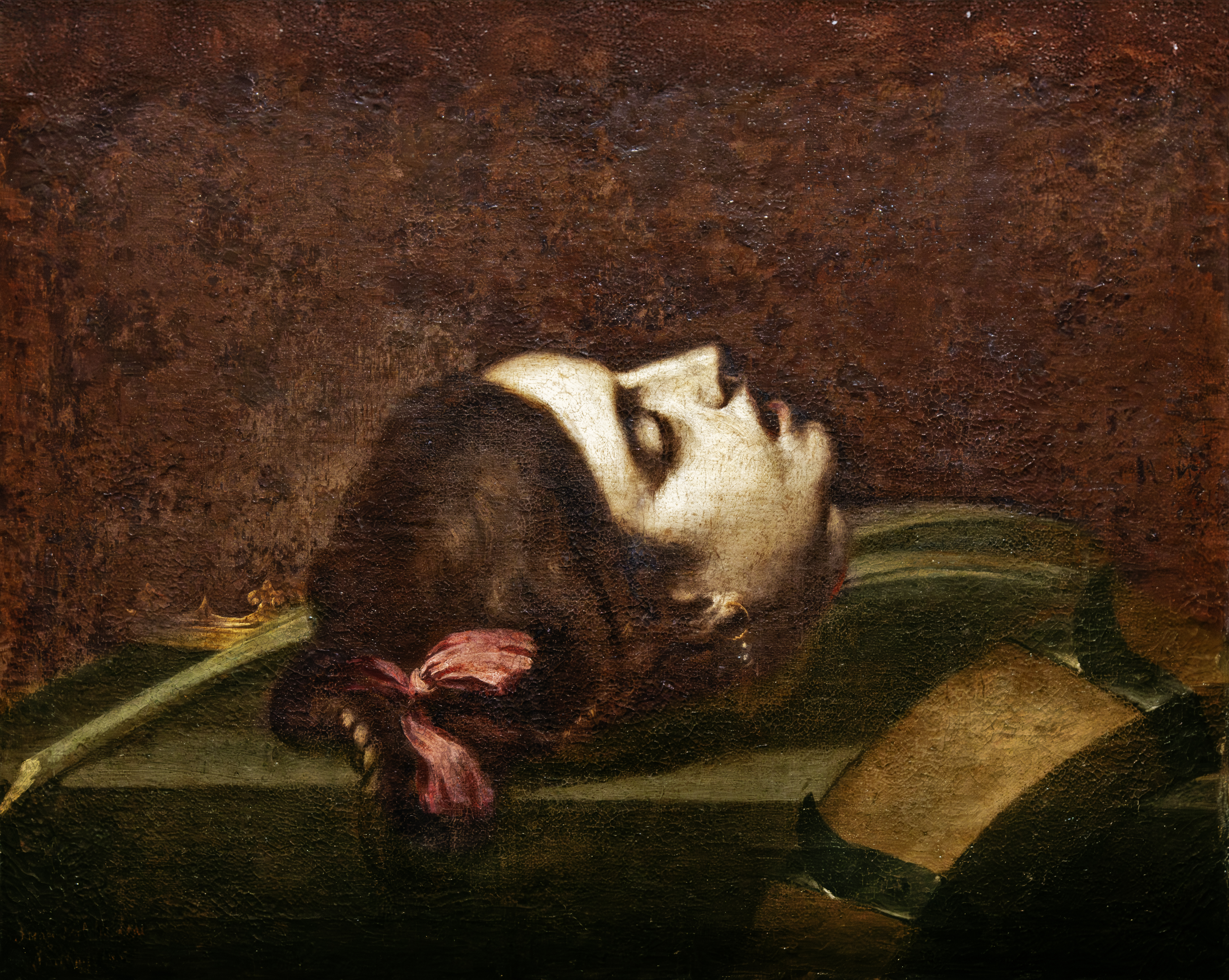
Head of Saint Catherine of Alexandria - Goya Museum

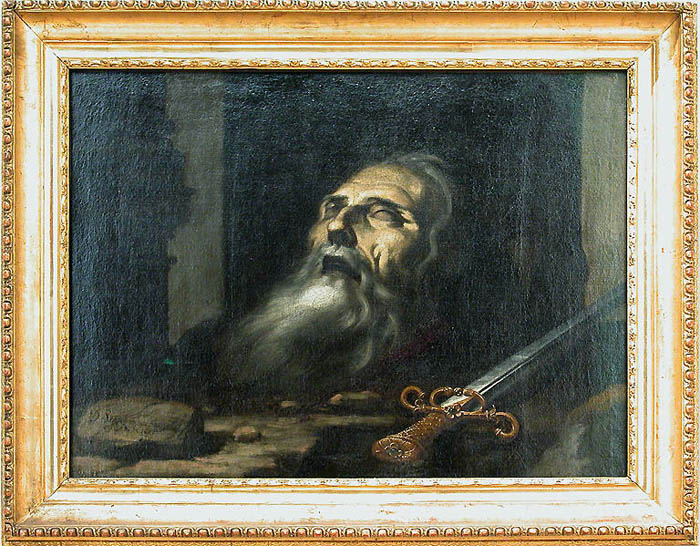
Llanos-cabeza cortada.
