= Cornelis Schut III =

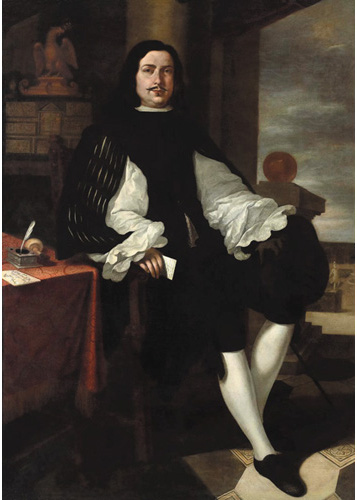
Portrait of Juan Bautista Priaroggia

Cornelio Schut or Cornelis Schut III (alternative names: Cornelis Escut III, Cornelis Scut III, Cornelio Schut el Mozo, Cornelio Schut el joven) (c. 1629 – 1685) was a Flemish painter who was active in Seville, Spain during his entire career. He was one of the leading Flemish painters working at that time in Seville and he was very close in style to Murillo.

== Life ==
He was born in Antwerp and trained with his uncle, the prominent Antwerp history painter Cornelis Schut. He travelled to Seville with his father who was employed by the Spanish king as an engineer. He is first documented in Seville in 1653 and the next year he was admitted to the local painters’ guild. He moved in the circle of the Flemish sculptor José de Arce and married de sister of the wife of de Arce. The couple had two daughters.

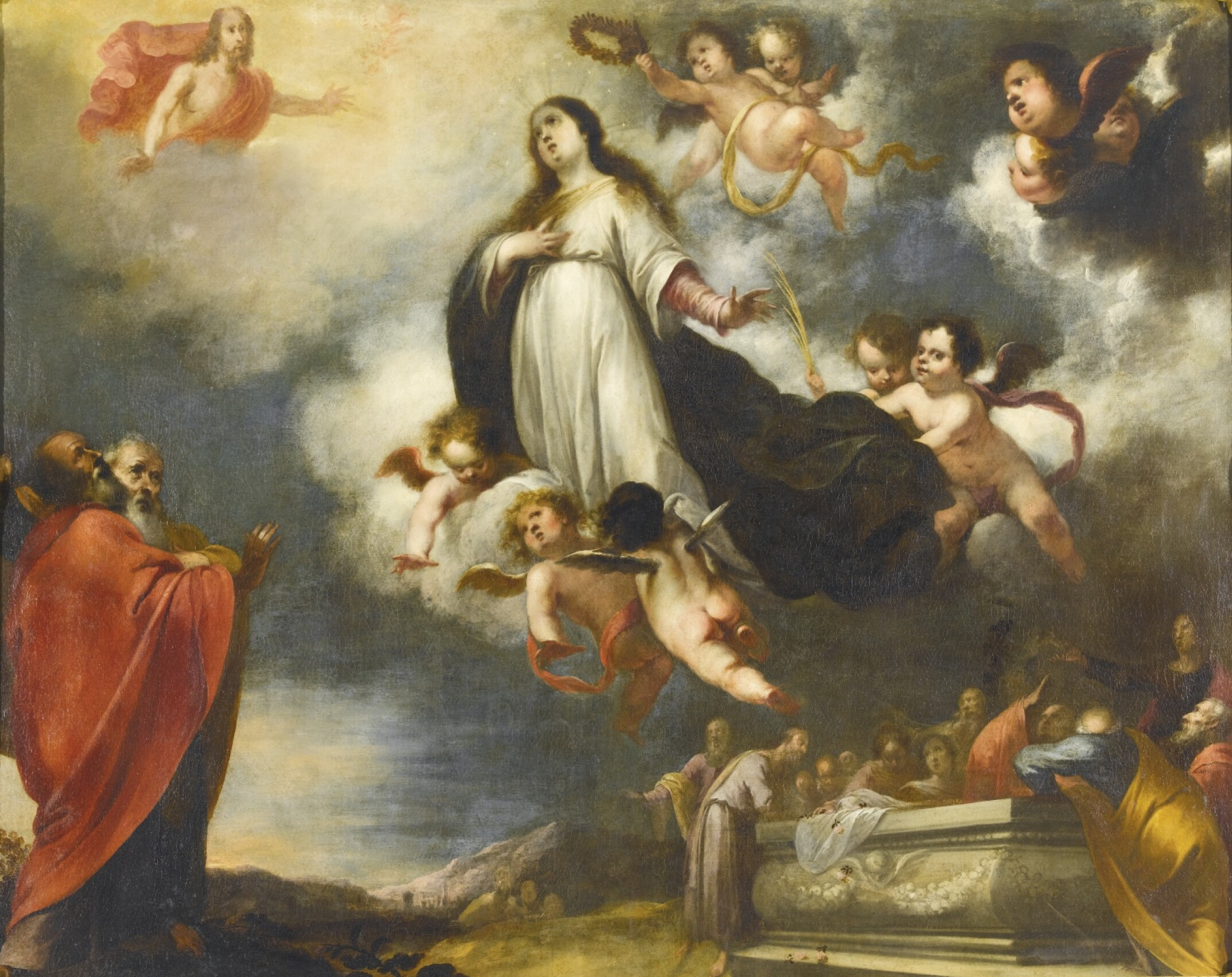
Assumption of the Virgin

With the support of de Arce Schut was able to secure commissions. In 1655 he engaged his first pupil in his workshop. He had more pupils, many of whom such as Manual Gallardo, José Lopez Chico and Juan Antonop Lopes dedicated themselves in their professional careers to the polychroming of retables. Schut's workshop completed commissions for his brother-in-law de Arce to polychrome his sculptures.

Schut was one of the founders of the Academy of Fine Arts of Seville in 1660 where he became a teacher of drawing. He was elected a president of the academy in 1672. Murillo and Francisco Herrera the Younger were the joint presidents. He was reelected four years later. He was one of the most generous contributors to the academy, often paying out of his own pocket the salary of art models and offering prizes to pupils.

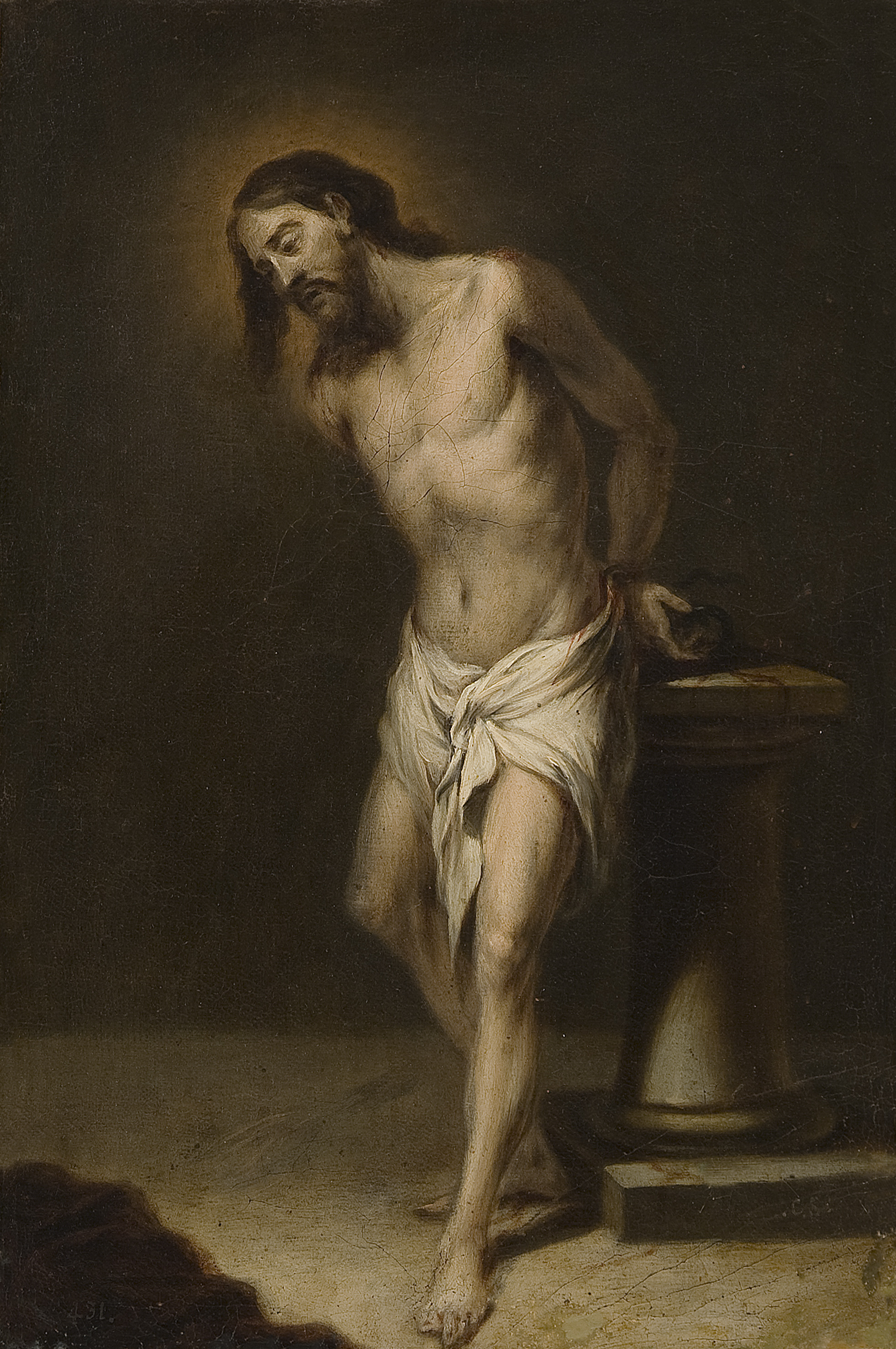
Christ Tied to a Pillar

He maintained close relationships with the artistic community in Seville as well as with the Flemish and Dutch merchants in the city. He died in Seville in 1685. Despite his successful career he died as a pauper since the treatment of the painful illness that led to his death had been very costly.

== Work ==
The majority of his work can be found in Seville with some works in Cádiz and other locations in Spain. He worked in many genres, including history paintings, portraits and still lifes. Most of his dated works were made in the 1660s. He did not deny his Flemish roots but under the influence of Murillo's work he developed a 'moderate Murillist' style. The confluence of Flemish and local artistic currents are a major feature of 17th-century painting in Seville. Many of his drawings have been preserved and they distinguish themselves in their fluidity and vividness of line that was close to that of Murillo to whom they have often been attributed.

His main commissions came from the chapter of Seville Cathedral. In addition, he completed many commissions for private persons and merchants which explains the variety of the genres in which he worked and the dispersion of his work in Spain. He made many versions of the Immaculate Conception, a theme in which he shows strong similarities to Murillo's iconographic treatment of this subject.
