= The Junta of the Philippines =

Painting by Francisco de Goya

- Junta de la Compañía de Filipinas (Spanish)
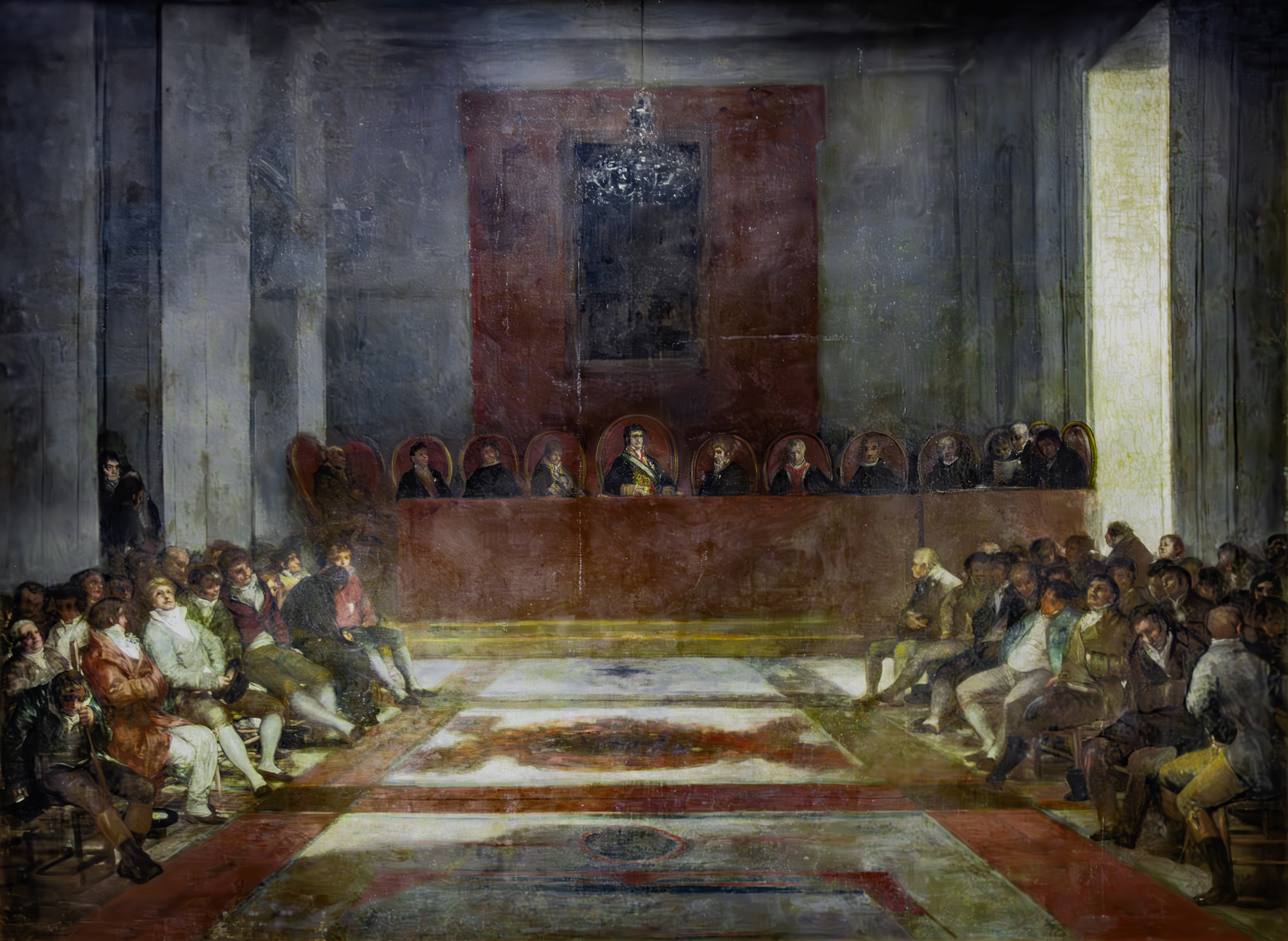
- Artist: Francisco Goya
- Year: c. 1815
- Medium: Oil on canvas
- Dimensions: 320 cm × 433 cm (130 in × 170 in)
- Location: Goya Museum, Castres, France

The Junta of the Philippines, or Sessions of the Junta of the Royal Company of the Philippines (Spanish: Junta de la Compañía de Filipinas) is an oil-on-canvas painting, c. 1815, by the Spanish artist Francisco Goya held by the Goya Museum located in Castres.

The work is the largest Goya produced. It was commissioned that year to commemorate the March 30th annual meeting of the Royal Company of the Philippines (Real Compañía de Filipinas) attended by 51 shareholders and members during a period when Goya was disillusioned by the formerly exiled Ferdinand VII's return to the Spanish crown, which moved away from enlightenment and ended the hopes of Spanish liberals for a more progressive Spain.

== Description ==
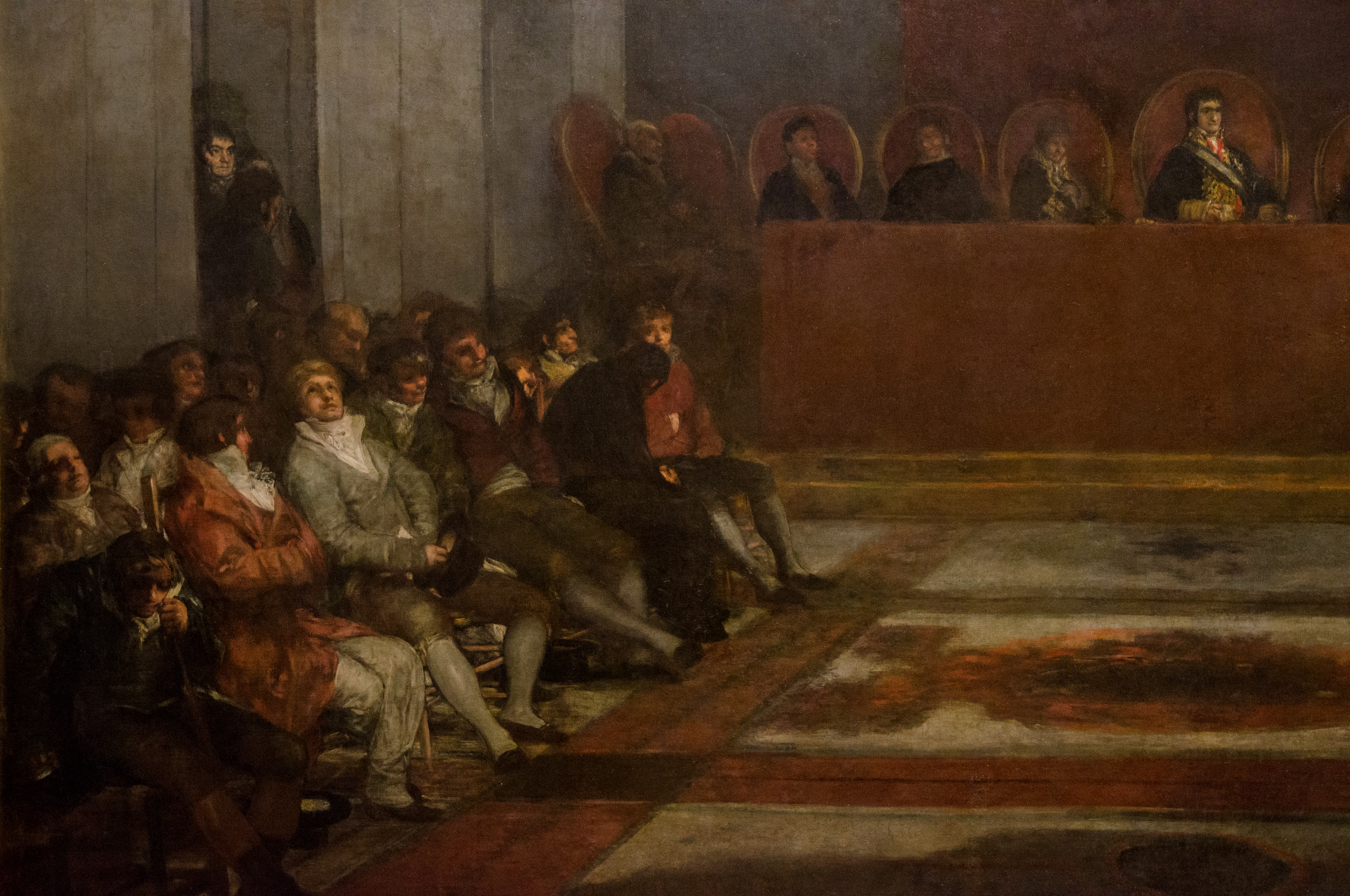
Detail

The Junta of the Philippines painting captures a moment when, unexpectedly, Ferdinand decided to attend the meeting of the Junta, intending his presence to be an affirmation of his commitment to the empire. However, it had the opposite effect; the Spanish economy and empire lay in ruins after the Peninsular War, the Royal Company of the Philippines was by that time so unprofitable and ineffective as to be irrelevant, and Ferdinand was a king who had learned nothing from the turmoil of the preceding years when he was overthrown. Ferdinand's return led to mass emigration and exile amongst the Spanish intellectual class. Although Goya remained in Spain for a number of years and continued to depict his king, he too fled in exile to France in 1824.

As with his c. 1800 Charles IV of Spain and His Family, the Spanish king is portrayed in full pomp and finery, albeit through barely concealed gritted teeth. Ferdinand is shown in the center middle-ground, seated at a raised table and flanked by trembling associates. To his left sits Miguel de Lardazibal, minister for the Indies, who was imprisoned the following September and forced into exile by the crown. Before these men, the assembly members are massed in two groups divided left and right by carpet. An expanse of light spills across the floor, spread before the absolute monarch, and lit from a source situated near the viewer of the painting. While the work was painted on commission and intended to hang in the ceremonial hall in which it was set, it highlights in an unflattering manner the centrality and impotent grip of the king. To art historian Albert Boime, the painting shows a monarch who rules not through respect, but through last resort; absolute power and fear.

Art historian Martin Gayford wrote that the painting is:

of a subject that was on the face of it fantastically dull: the annual meeting of a trading company the business of which had become completely unprofitable as a result of the Napoleonic Wars. So in a way it is an image of futility. It depicts various notables and shareholders looking very bored, and the King of Spain. Above all, it is a painting of an empty space in an enormous room, which seems both mysterious and somehow very Spanish.

Gayford quoted Lucian Freud: "I went to see it and it is really of absolutely nothing".

== See also ==
- List of works by Francisco Goya

== Bibliography ==
- Boime, Albert. Art in an age of counterrevolution, 1815-1848. Chicago University Press, 2004. ISBN 0-226-06337-2
- Hughes, Robert. Goya. New York: Alfred A. Knopf, 2004. ISBN 0-394-58028-1
- Junquera, Juan José. The Black Paintings of Goya. London: Scala Publishers, 2008. ISBN 1-85759-273-5
- Roskill, Mark W. The interpretation of pictures. University of Massachusetts, 1989. ISBN 0-87023-661-X
