= Our Lady of the Rosary (Murillo, Paris) =

Painting by Bartolomé Esteban Murillo

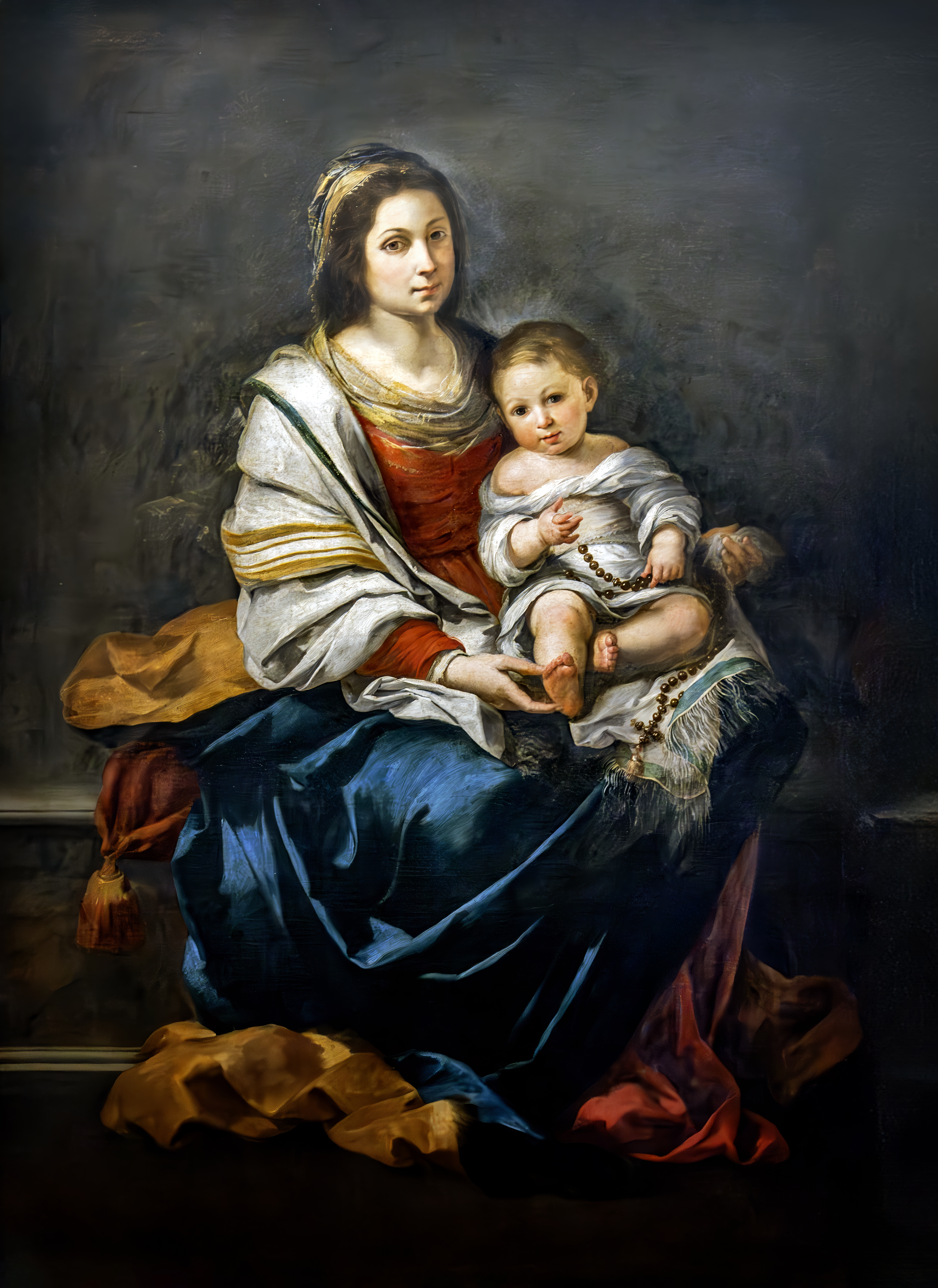

Our Lady of the Rosary or 'Madonna and Child is a 1648-1650 oil on canvas painting by Bartolomé Esteban Murillo. On 24 November 1784 it was bought from the Comte de Vaudreuil for 9,001 livres by Louis XVI and displayed at the Muséum central des arts from 1793 onwards. It remains owned by the Louvre Museum, though it has been on long-loan to the Goya Museum in Castres since 1949.
