= Marguerite Legot =

Belgian politician

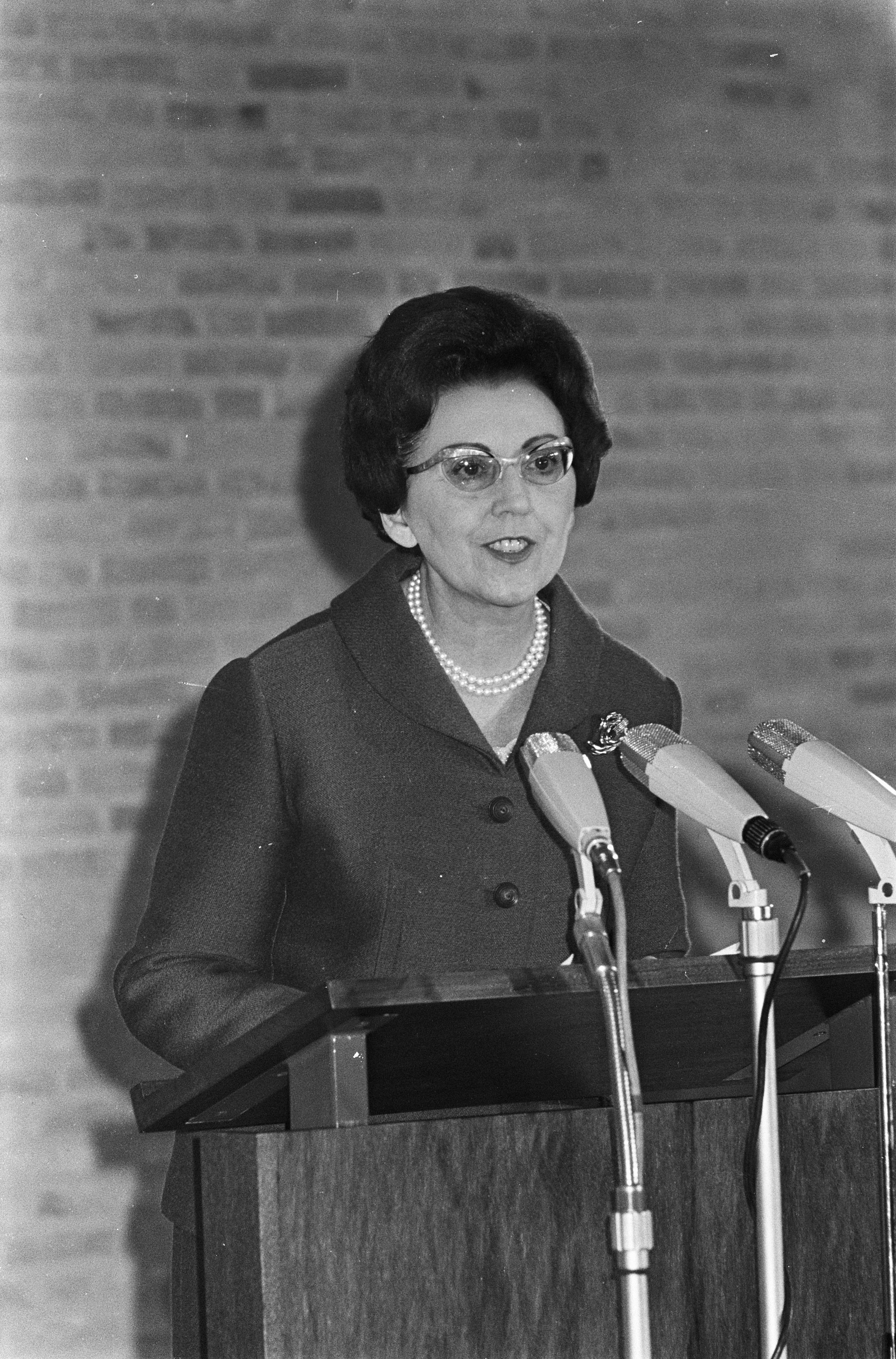
- Born: Marguerite Victorine Zéphirine Anne De Riemaecker-Legot; 9 March 1913; Oudenaarde, Belgium
- Died: 7 May 1977 (aged 64); Brussels, Belgium
- Occupation: politician
- Known for: first female Belgian government minister

Marguerite Victorine Zéphirine Anne De Riemaecker-Legot (pronounced [maʁɡəʁit ləɡo]; 9 March 1913 – 7 May 1977) was the first Belgian woman to serve as a government minister, and the first to be appointed Minister of State.

Daughter of Leonardus Legot, a lawyer, and Maria Jeurissen, Marguerite was born in Oudenaarde and educated at the Bernardine school there, attending high school in neighbouring Ghent. She studied law at Ghent University, graduating in 1936. She soon abandoned a legal career in Brussels to teach elementary civil and constitutional law in school. It was at this time that she became associated with Christian Socialist Senator Maria Baers.

On 7 May 1938, Marguerite Legot married engineer Jules De Riemaecker, becoming Marguerite De Riemaecker-Legot. The couple had two sons.

After the Second World War, De Riemaecker-Legot worked with Henri Pauwels, Minister with responsibility for victims of the war, later becoming a senior civil servant in that department. She was the only woman serving on the national committee of the Christian Democrats, and was active in the female branch of the Catholic Trade Union. In 1946 she was elected to the Belgian Chamber of People's Representatives as one of the Brussels representatives. She was re-elected until 1971. From 1953 to 1958, and from 1962 to 1965, she served as secretary of the Chamber. From 1951 she served as a delegate to the United Nations, and sat in the European Parliament from 1958 to 1961.

Active in social policy, she was the first Minister for the Family and Housing when that post was created in 1965. From 1970 to 1976 she was active in Brussels, serving as an échevine from 1971 to 1976. On 18 October 1974 she was awarded the Order of Leopold II and appointed Minister of State. She died in Brussels in 1977.
