= Francisco Varela (painter) =

Spanish Baroque painter

Francisco Varela (c. 1580 – 1645), was a Spanish Baroque painter. He was one of the disciples of Juan de las Roelas.

== Career ==
He was born, lived and worked all his life in Seville. In 1625 a teacher was responsible to check the skills of the aspiring artist to join the guild of painters in the city. As most of the painters of his generation, his was originally a Mannerist style evolved towards naturalism, anticipating in some respects to the model developed later by Francisco de Zurbarán.

The work that has come from Varela is scarce. There are two representations of the Last Supper, one of them made in 1622, probably inspired by a mannerist engraving, is located in the Church of San Bernardo in Seville, the other with an iconography very similar, was acquired in 2004 by the Regional Government of Andalusia, is on display at the Museum of Fine Arts of Seville. Also of note is the Portrait of Martinez Montanes (1616) belonging to the city of Seville and San Miguel Archangel (1629).

One of his last known works, executed in 1640, is the set of paintings made for the Convent of the Passion of Seville which are also exhibited at the Museum of Fine Arts. The series consists of San Cristóbal and San Augustine, St. Catherine of Siena with Santa Lucia and St. Catherine of Alexandria with St. Teresa of Jesus.

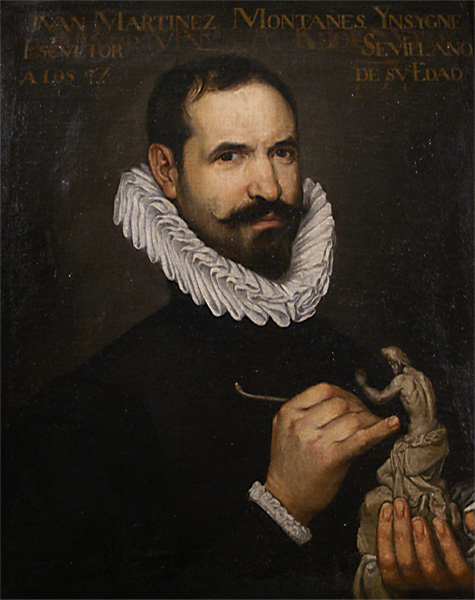
Portrait of the sculptor Martinez Montanes, 1616

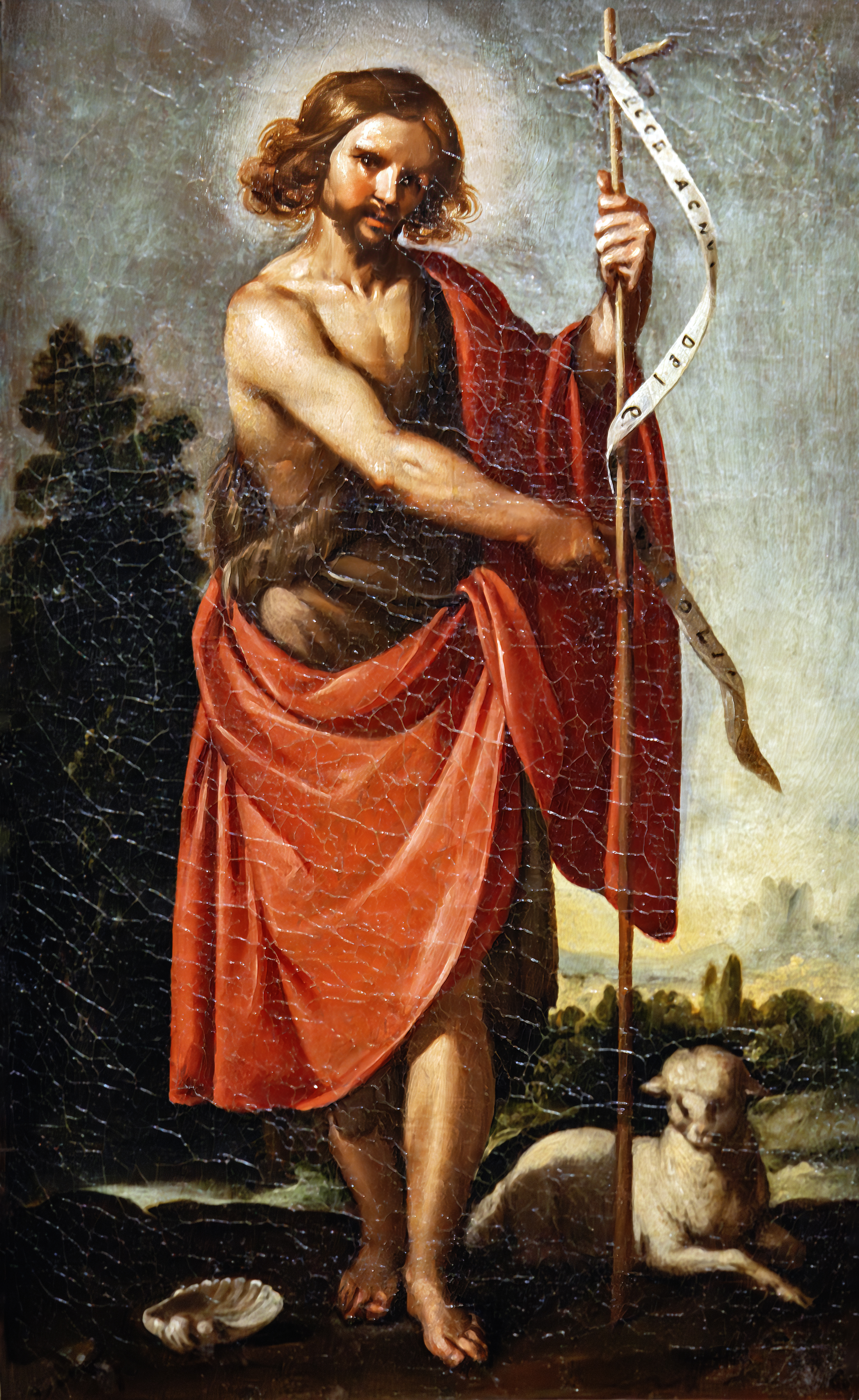
John the Baptist, Goya Museum
