= Celso Lagar =

Spanish painter (1891–1966)

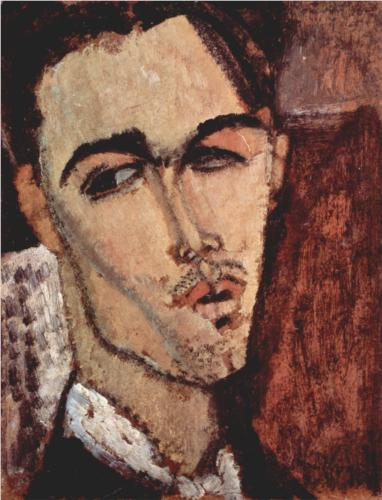
- Born: Celso Lagar Arroyo; February 4, 1891; Ciudad Rodrigo, Spain
- Died: September 6, 1966 (aged 75); Sevilla, Spain
- Known for: Painting, Sculpture
- Movement: First Generation School of Paris
- Spouse: Hortense Begué

Celso Lagar Arroyo was a Spanish painter. In the late nineteenth century, he was one of the first generation Spanish expressionist painters from the School of Paris, where he lived most of his life. He was influenced greatly by Cubism or Fauvism.

== Biography ==
Celso Lagar Arroyo was born in a small cathedral city Ciudad Rodrigo. In his early days, he went to Madrid to be part of the workshop of one of the best sculptors of the moment, Miguel Blay. During 1910 and 1911 he visited Barcelona. He later studied sculpture in Paris in 1911 on the advice of Blay. There he met Joseph Bernard, his friend Amedeo Modigliani and his future wife, the French sculptor, Hortense Begué. From then, he gradually abandoned sculpture in favor of painting.

Lagar remained in Barcelona during the First World War, where he achieved a certain level of recognition. It allowed him to return to Paris, and 1919 he settled permanently in France. His works were exhibited in some of the notable Parisian galleries. After the period of avant-garde influences (Cubism, Fauvism, Vibrationism, Orphism, Divisionism, Ultraist), Lagar chose his own path, influenced by Goya and Picasso. His works from this time received critical and public recognition.

With the Second World War, both Lagar and his wife Hortense became refugees in the French Pyrenees, with difficult living conditions and severe financial hardship. Hortense was admitted to the Broca hospital and in 1955 she died. Lagar fell into a deep depression after her death and was admitted to the Sainte Anne asylum: his artistic creativity succumbed. During this time, by court order, two auctions of the works which had been remaining in his workshop were held to pay for his care. In October 1964 he returned to Seville, Spain, living with his sister until his death on September 6, 1966.

== Works ==
His paintings are found in numerous museums throughout Europe, such as: La Rochelle, Goya Museum in Castres, Honfleur in France, Petit-Palais in Geneva, Museo Nacional Centro de Arte Reina Sofía, the Lis House in Salamanca, Carmen Thyssen Museum in Málaga and even in the notable collections such as Crane Kalman in London or Zborowski in Paris.

Some of his renowned works include:

- La vida en el campo (Life in the Country)
- El Retrato de Xavier Montsalvatge (The Portrait of Xavier Montsalvatge)
- Ensayo de luz por el planismo o Retrato de nena (Essay of Light through Planism and Portrait of a Girl)
- Desnudo (Naked)
- Arlequins (Harlequins)
- Jeune acrobate (Young acrobat)
- Clowns et haltérophiles (Clowns and weightlifters)
- Les bohémiens (Gypsies)

== Sources ==
- Gustave Kahn, Celso Lagar, painter, Max Jiménez, sculptor, Éditions Galerie Percier, Paris, 1924.
- Max Jacob, Celso Lagar, painter, Hortense Begué, sculptor, Éditions Galerie Zborowski, Paris, 1928.
- Blaise Cendrars, Celso Lagar, Éditions Galerie Druet, 1935.
- César González-Ruano, Mi medio siglo se confiesa a medias, Noguer, Barcelona, 1950.
- Josep Francesc Ràfols, Diccionario biográfico de artistas de Cataluña, desde la época romana hasta nuestras dias, Barcelona, 1951-1954.
- Fernand Ledoux, Celso Lagar, Éditions Galerie de Paris, 1961.
- José Gomez-Salvado, “Genio y dramatismo en Celso Lagar”, ABC daily, Madrid, October 29, 1966
- Cien anos de pintura en España y Portugal, 1830-1930, vol. IV, Antiqvaria, Barcelona, 1990.
- Jacqueline Collex, “Homage to Celso Lagar and Grau Sala ”, Le Pays d'Auge review, n ° 6, June 1990.
- Narciso Alba, Celso Lagar y la escuela de Paris, Diputacion provincial, Salamanca, 1991.
- Narciso Alba, Celso Lagar, aquel maldito de Montparnasse, Junta de Castilla y León, Valladolid, 1992.
- Gérald Schurr, Le guidargus de la peinture, Les Éditions de l'Amateur, 1993.
- Isabel García García, Orígenes de las vanguardias artísticas en Madrid (1909-1922), Universidad Complutense de Madrid, Department of Contemporary Art History, March 1998
- Narciso Alba, “Sobre algunos personajes de Pombo y Automoribundia”, in Ramón Gómez de La Serna, studies compiled by Évelyne Martin-Hernandez, Cahiers de Recherches du CLRMC, Université Blaise-Pascal UFR Letters, Clermont-Ferrand, 1999 (read online)
- Emmanuel Bénézit, Dictionary of painters, sculptors, designers and engravers, Gründ, 1999.
- Jean-Pierre Delarge, Dictionary of modern and contemporary plastic arts, Gründ, 2001.
- Glosario de historia del arte, Editorial Salvat, 2005.
- Isabel García García, Celso Lagar, TF Editores & Interactiva SLU, 2010.
- Aránzazu Ascunce Arenas, Barcelona and Madrid - Social networks of the avant-garde, Bucknell University Press, 2012.
- Sonia Adriana d'Agosto Forteza, Celso Lagar, una aportación sugerente a su catálogo, University of Seville, Department of Art History, 2014.
- Constantin Prut, Dicționar de artă modernă și contemporană, Polirom Publishing, Bucharest, 2016.
