= Academia de Bellas Artes (Seville) =

Former art school in Seville, Spain

The Academia de Bellas Artes or Academy of Fine Arts of Seville was an institution for the instruction of students into the diverse arts. It was founded on January 1, 1660, upon the encouragement of Bartolomé Esteban Murillo, its first president. Murillo was able to also obtain the support of Juan de Valdés Leal, the second president and the younger Francisco de Herrera for this association, and the first meeting was attended by Herrera, Murillo, Valdés Leal, Sebastian Llanos y Valdes, Pedro Honorio de Palencia, Cornelio Schut, Ignacio de Iriarte, Matias de Arteaga, Matias de Carbajal, Antonio de Lejalde, Juan de Arenas, Juan Martinez, Pedro Ramirez, Bernabé de Ayala, Carlos de Negron, Pedro de Medina, Bernardo Arias Maldonado, Diego Diaz, Antonio de Zarzoza, Juan Lopez Carrasco, Pedro de Camprobin, Martin de Atienza, Alonso Perez de Herrera.

"The duties of the presidents, who revolved their position on alternate weeks, were to direct the progress of the pupils, resolve their doubts and settle their disputes, impose fines and preserve order in the school, and select new members entitled them to the rank of academician. The expenses of coal candle models and other items were defrayed by a monthly subscription of six reales, paid by each member; while students were liberally admitted for the purposes of study, on the payment of whatever fee they could afford.

The students had to profess their orthodoxy by stating "Praised be the most holy Eucharist and the Immaculate Conception of Our Lady". In school, conversation on subjects irrelevant to the subjects of the school was prohibited, and the offender was fined if he persevered in it, after the president had rung his bell twice. Swearing, profane language, and offences against good manners were also fined.

After a brief dip in students, by 1673, the academy had 43 members. The academy was not successful in fostering students that ever matched in eminence those of the academy's founders. This Sevillian Academy predated the Academia Real de Bellas Artes de San Fernando in Madrid.
