= Eugenio Lucas Velázquez =

Spanish painter

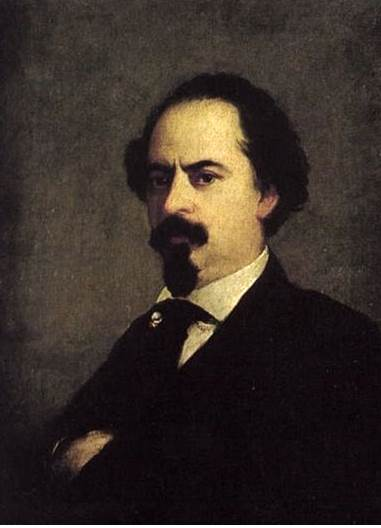
Self-portrait (1862)

Eugenio Lucas Velázquez (9 February 1817 – 11 September 1870) was a Spanish painter in the Romantic style, known for genre and costumbrista scenes which often featured fantastic elements. Nineteenth-century sources refer to him as Eugenio Lucas Padilla, which has caused some confusion, although it seems reasonable to assume that Velázquez was an adopted name. Few of his paintings are signed, causing a problem with attribution.

== Biography ==
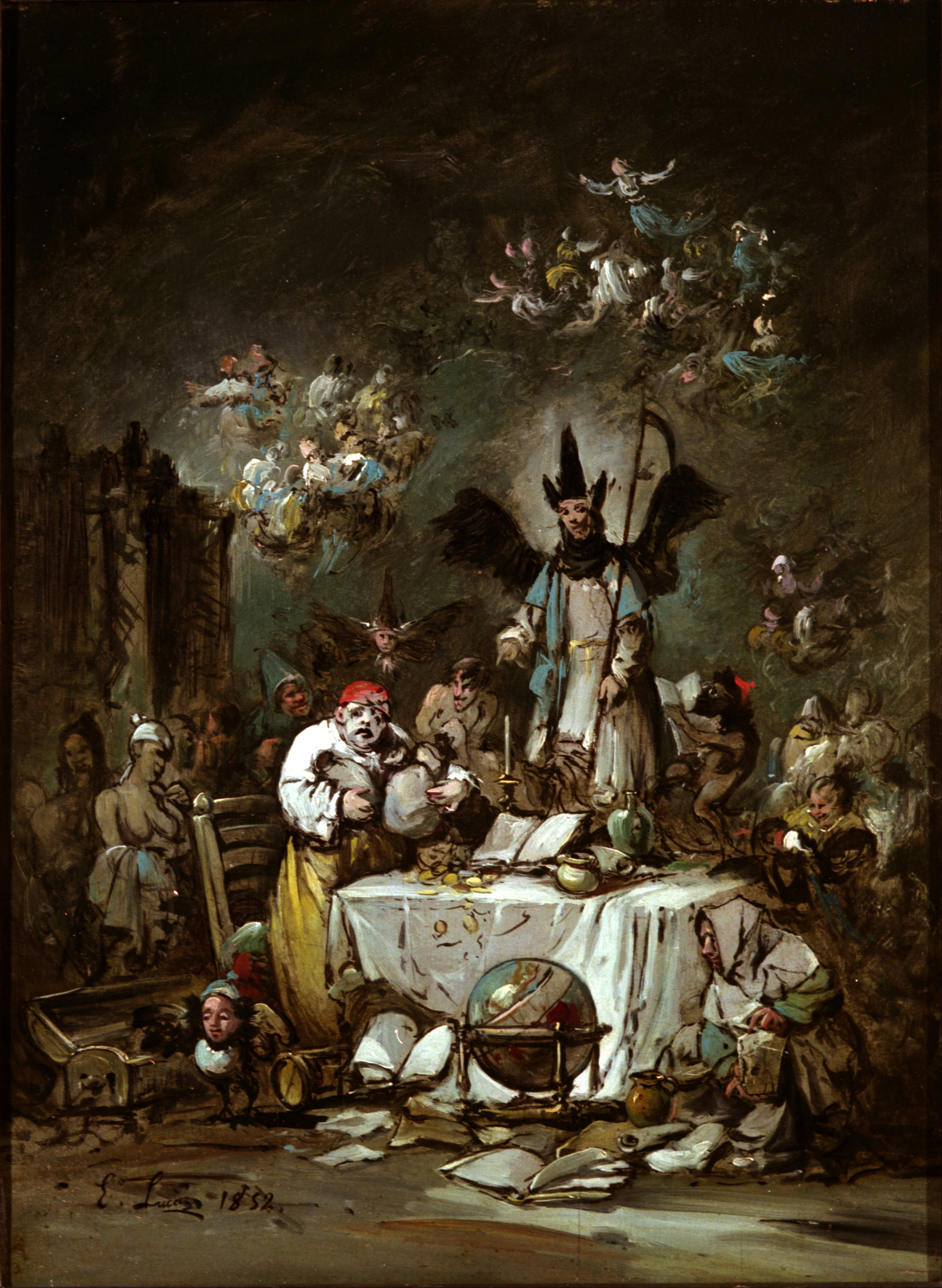
Allegory on Avarice

He was born to a middle-class family in Madrid and was originally a cabinet-maker. It is difficult to reconstruct his artistic studies. In the catalog accompanying his works at the Exposition Universelle (1855), he claims to have attended the Real Academia de Bellas Artes de San Fernando and studied with José de Madrazo, even though he had abandoned the Classicism taught there. It is known that he displayed four works at the Academia in 1841 and spent long hours copying the paintings at the Museo del Prado; especially those of Goya and Diego Velázquez.

He joined the National Militia in 1843 and was a member until the late 1850s. The following year, he married Martina Hernández Muñoz. In 1848, apparently suffering from financial difficulties, they went to live with her aunt, Vicenta. Within a year, thanks to some successful exhibitions, he had acquired commissions that enabled them to establish their own home.

In 1850, he was one of the artists commissioned to provide decorations for the ceiling of the new Teatro Real (since painted over or removed). Queen Isabel II attended the opening, named him an honorary court painter, and made him a Knight in the Order of Charles III. After that, most of his clients came from the upper nobility; most notably, the Marqués de Salamanca, who later had one of Goya's Black Paintings removed and placed in his palace.

In 1852, he took a trip to Paris, possibly accompanied by his mistress, Francisca Villaamil, the sister of Jenaro Pérez Villaamil. In Paris he came under the influence of Delacroix. The following year, he and his wife were separated. He and Francisca had four children, including the artist, Eugenio Lucas Villaamil.

During the 1860s, he made several more trips to Paris, with visits to Switzerland and Italy. On one trip to Paris, it is said that he went to the Louvre and discovered that a painting attributed to Diego Velázquez was actually one of his. True or not, this could serve to explain his use of the name "Velázquez". In his later years, he was criticized as being a mere copier of Goya.

He died on 11 September 1870 in Madrid.

== Selected paintings ==
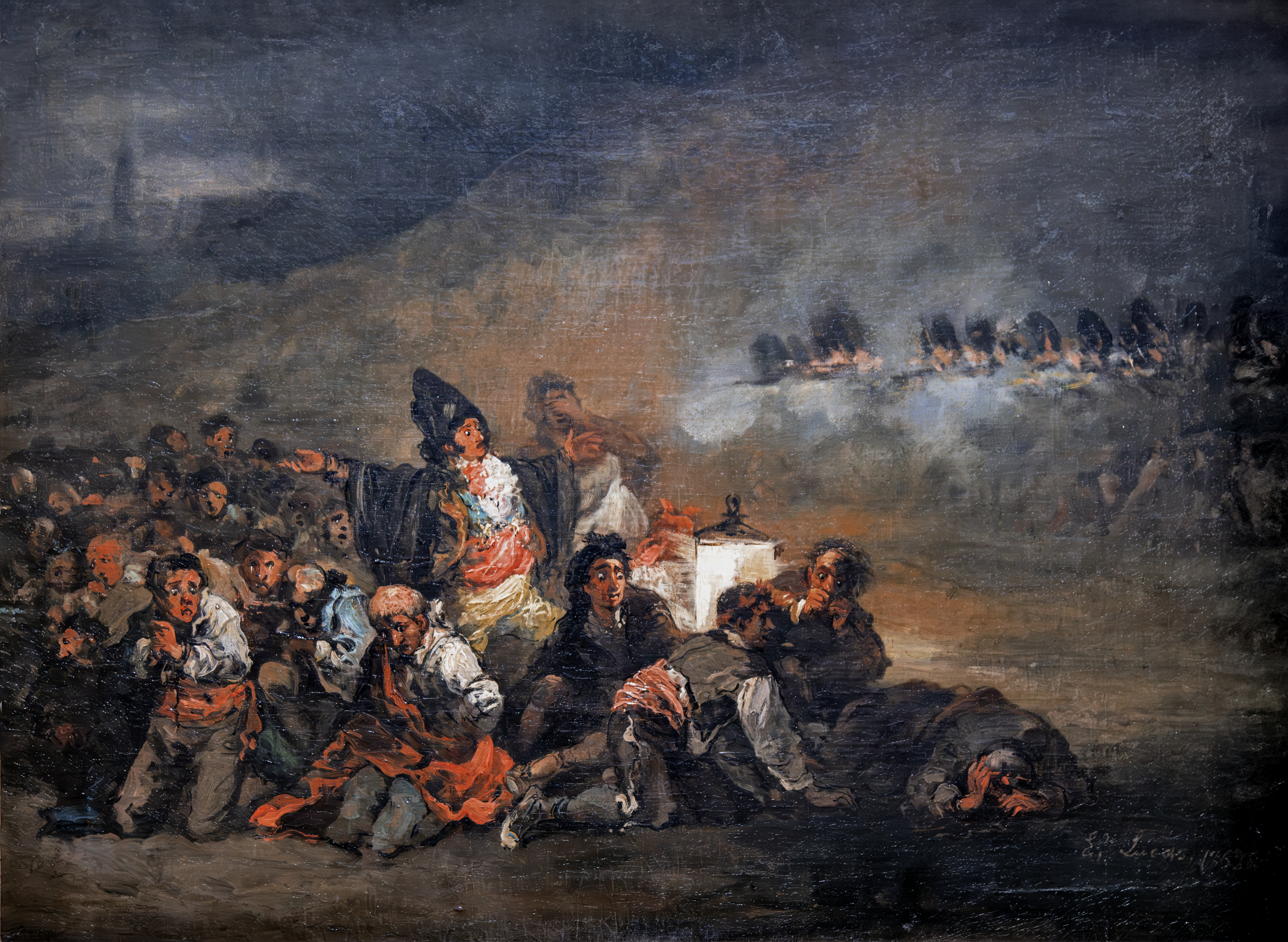
The Execution

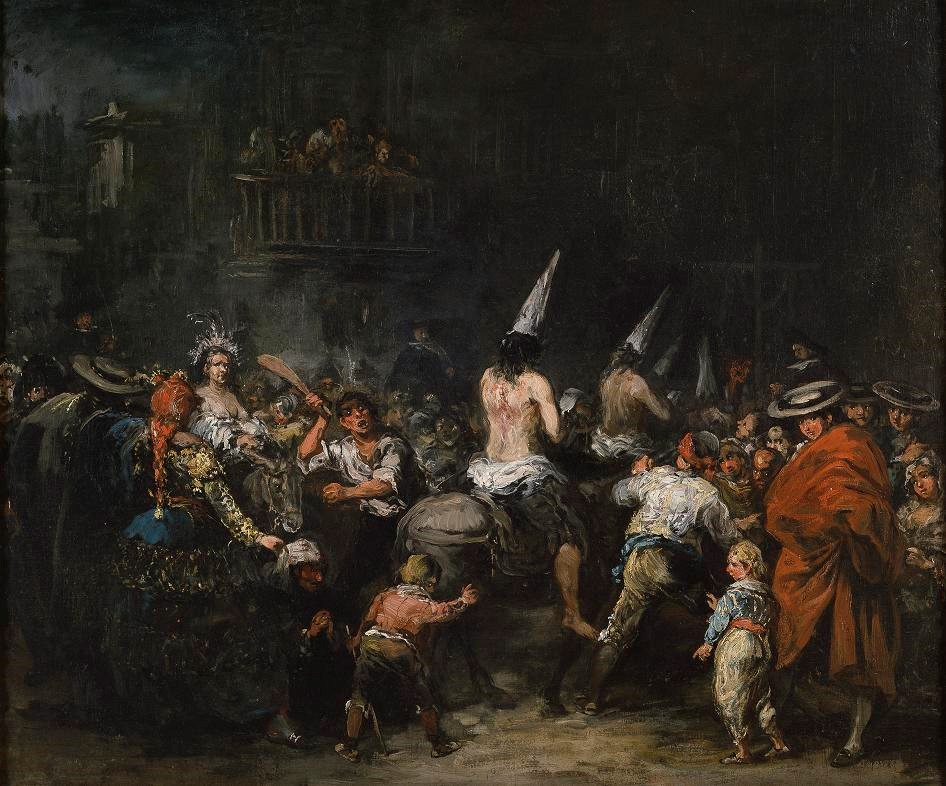
Condemned by
the Inquisition

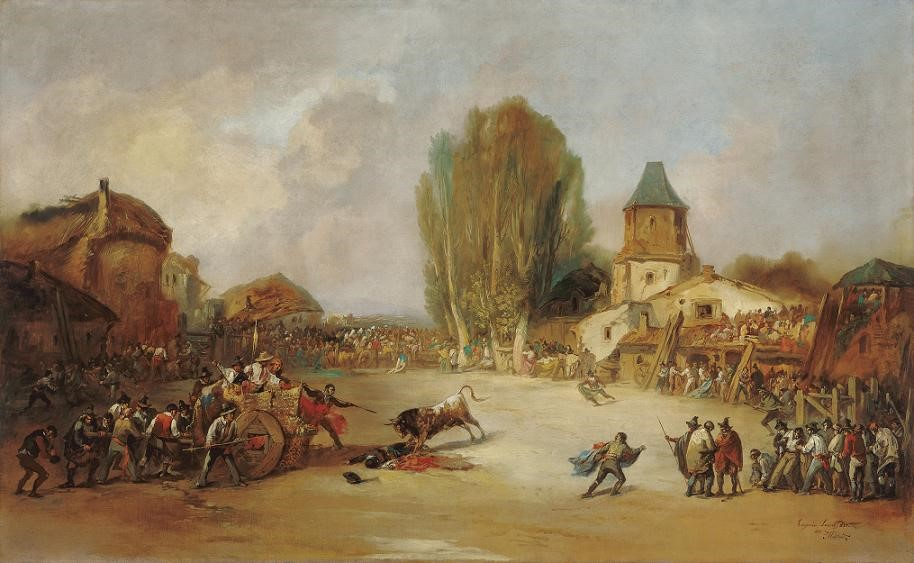
Goring at an
Amateur Bullfight

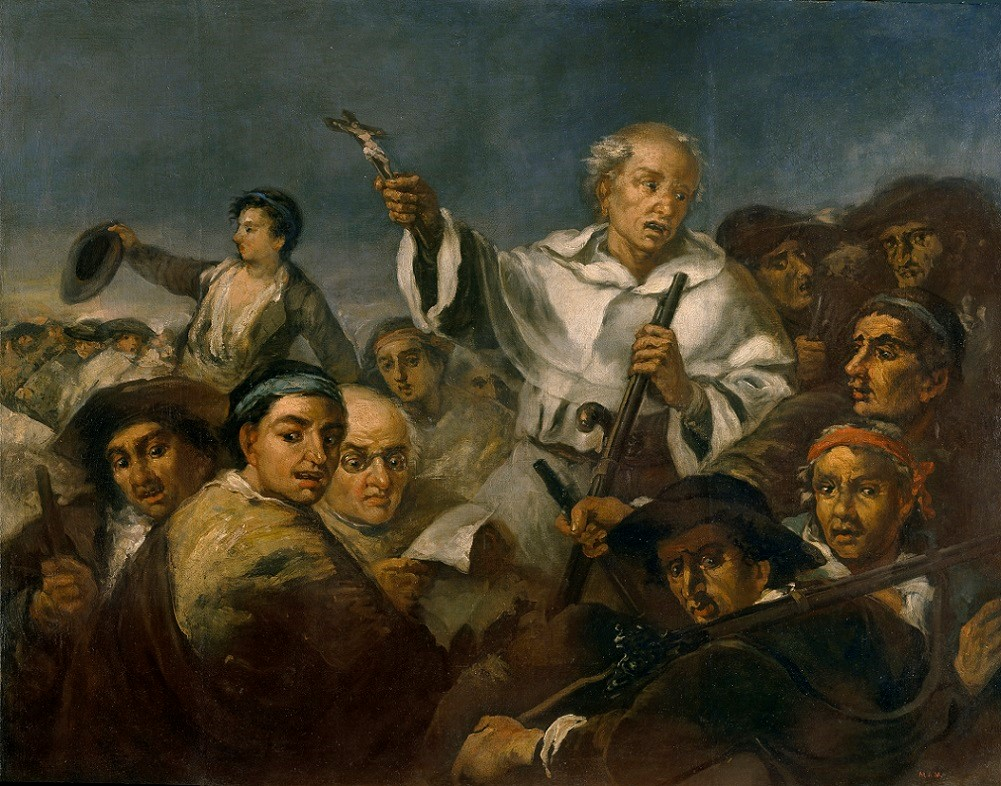
Revolution

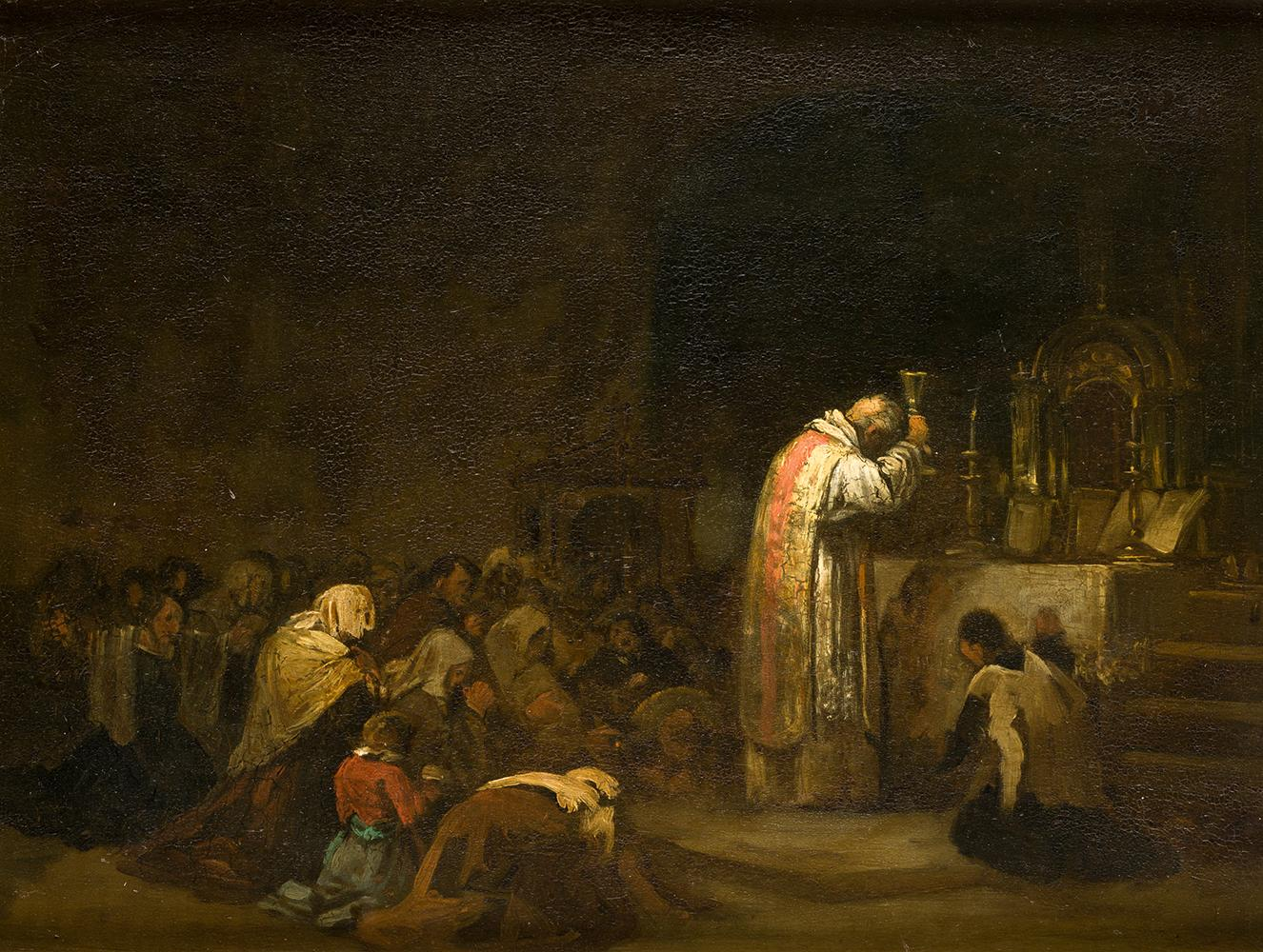
Mass (The Elevation)
