= Maria Baers =

Belgian politician and feminist

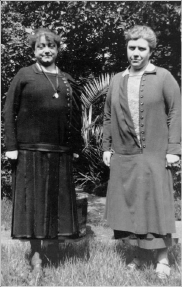
- Victoire Cappe (left) and Maria Baers

Member of the Belgian Senate
- In office 30 June 1936 – 12 March 1954

Personal details
- Born: Maria Gabriella Baers; 20 September 1883; Antwerp, Belgium
- Died: 30 December 1959 (aged 76); Brussels, Belgium
- Political party: Christian Social Party (CSP) (1945-); Catholic Union of Belgium (KVB) (-1936)

Maria Gabriella Baers (20 September 1883 – 30 December 1959) was a Belgian senator, feminist, and trade unionist. Baers was the founder of Nationaal Verbond der Christelijke Vrouwengilden (National Union of Christian Women's Guilds. nowadays: Femma). In 1936, Baers and Maréchal were the first women senators in Belgium. In 1945, she became the first women Secretary of the Senate, and the first chairwomen of a parliamentary commission.

== Biography ==
Baers was born on 20 September 1883 in Antwerp. She went to high school at the Sœurs of Notre-Dame and was therefore fluent in both Dutch and French. She studied social sciences at the University of Freiburg.

In 1908, Baers joined the local women union in Antwerp for lace workers and glove makers. In 1912, Baers and Victoire Cappe founded the Algemeen Secretariaat der Christelijke Vrouwenvakverenigingen (General Secretary of Christian Women Unions). Baers moved to Brussels, and in 1920 founded the Nationaal Verbond der Christelijke Vrouwengilden (National Union of Christian Women's Guilds), an emancipated movement for working-class women which is nowadays called Femma. Baers would head the organisation until 1951.

In 1936, Baers was elected to the Belgian Senate and remain a senator until 1954. Baers and Maréchal were the first women senators in Belgium. Baers would remain senator during World War II. She wanted to prevent forced labour of Belgian women in Germany. Together with J. Vervaeck of the Ministry of Labour, they managed to stop deportation of women under the age of 24, however Baers continued to increase pressure. On 22 March 1943, all deportations of women ended.

In 1945, Baers became the first women Secretary of the Senate, and became Chairperson of the Parliamentary Commission on Health.

On 30 December 1959, Baers died in Brussels at the age of 76. In 1998, the auditorium of the Flemish Community was named after Maria Baers.

== Bibliography ==
- Payne, Matthias (2015). De politieke en juridische rol van Maria Baers (PDF) (Thesis) (in Dutch). Ghent University.
