= Goya Museum =

Art museum in Castres, France

Coordinates: 43.6036°N 2.2417°E

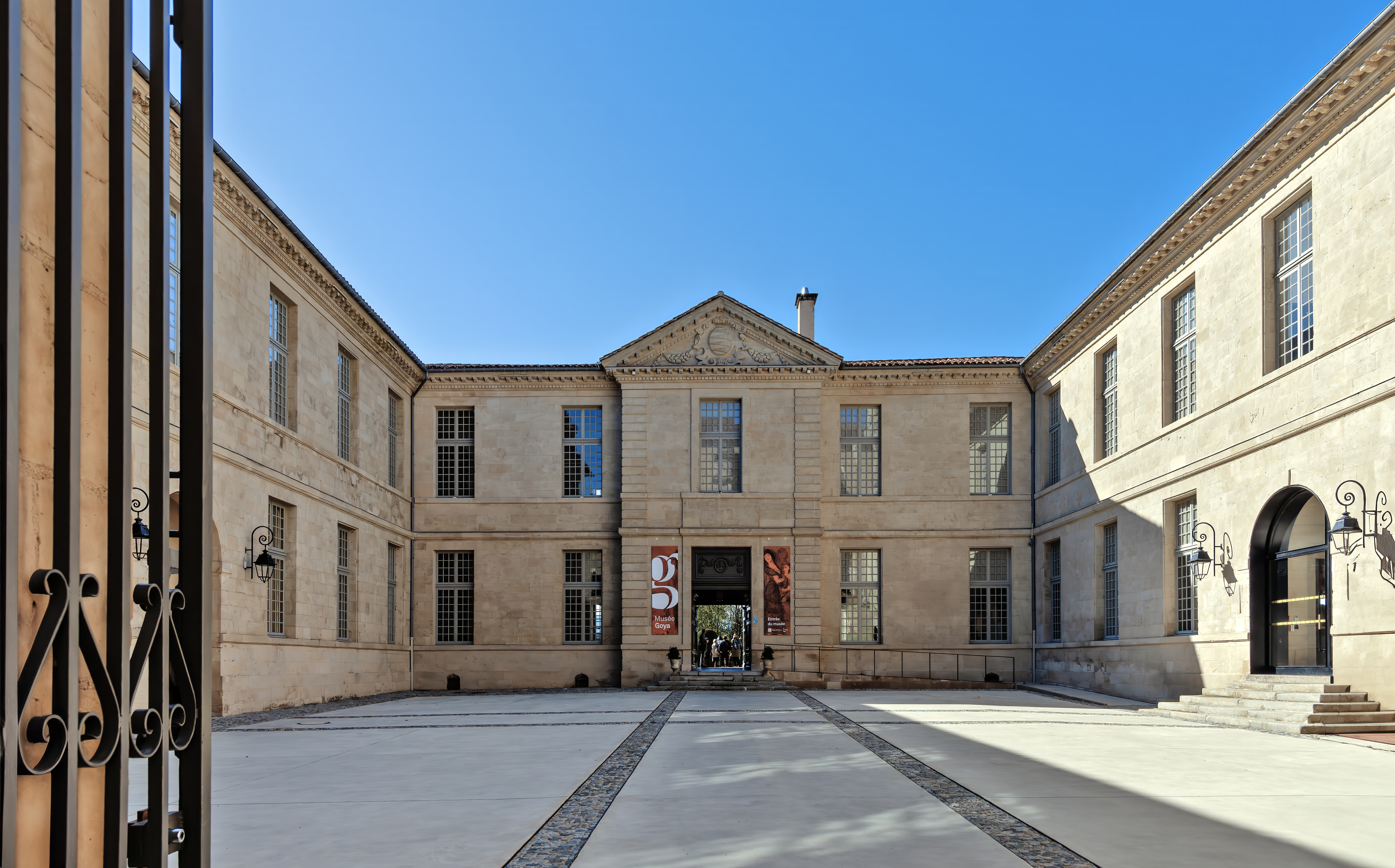
The Goya Museum building.

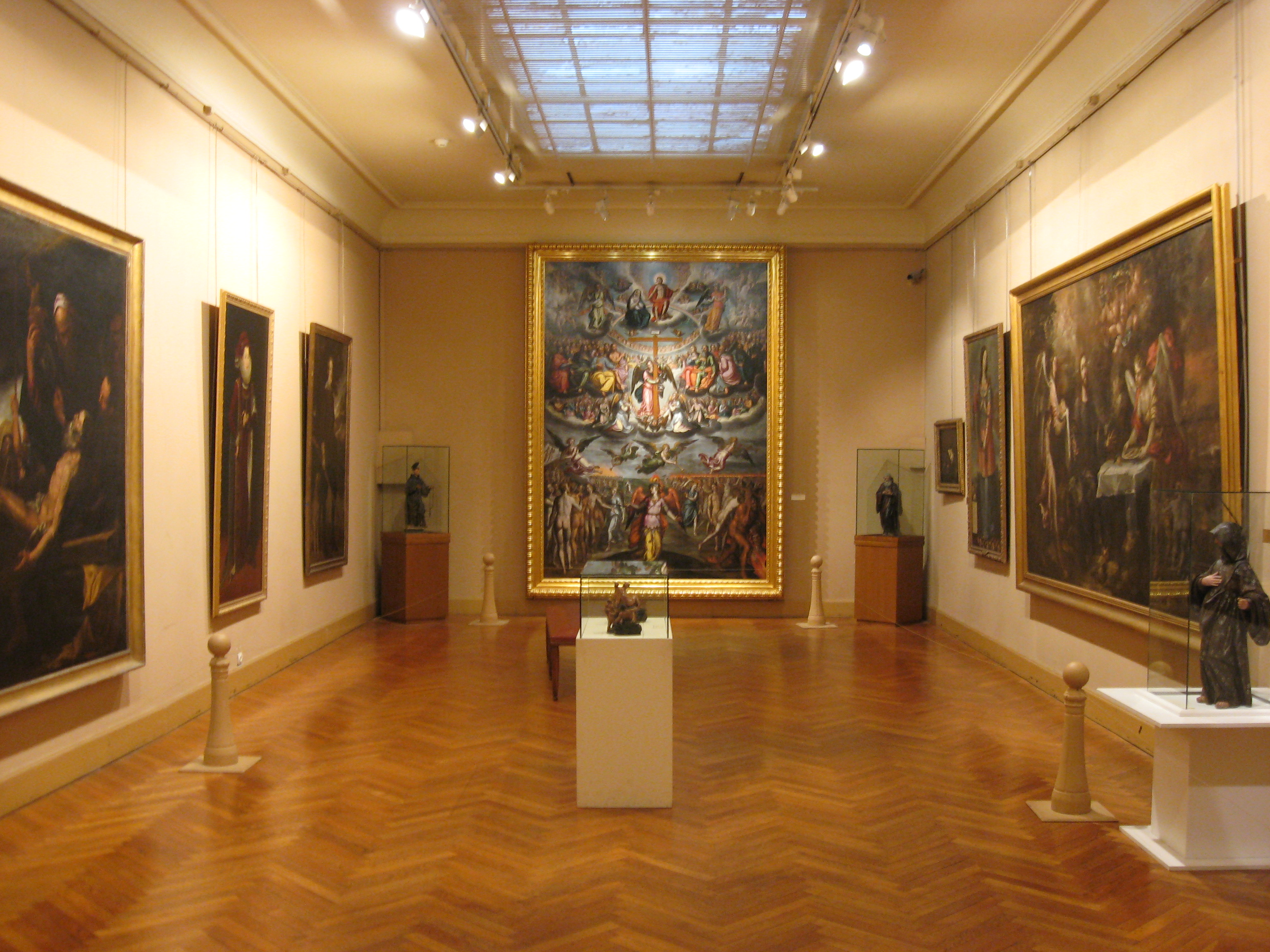
Interior view of one of the galleries.

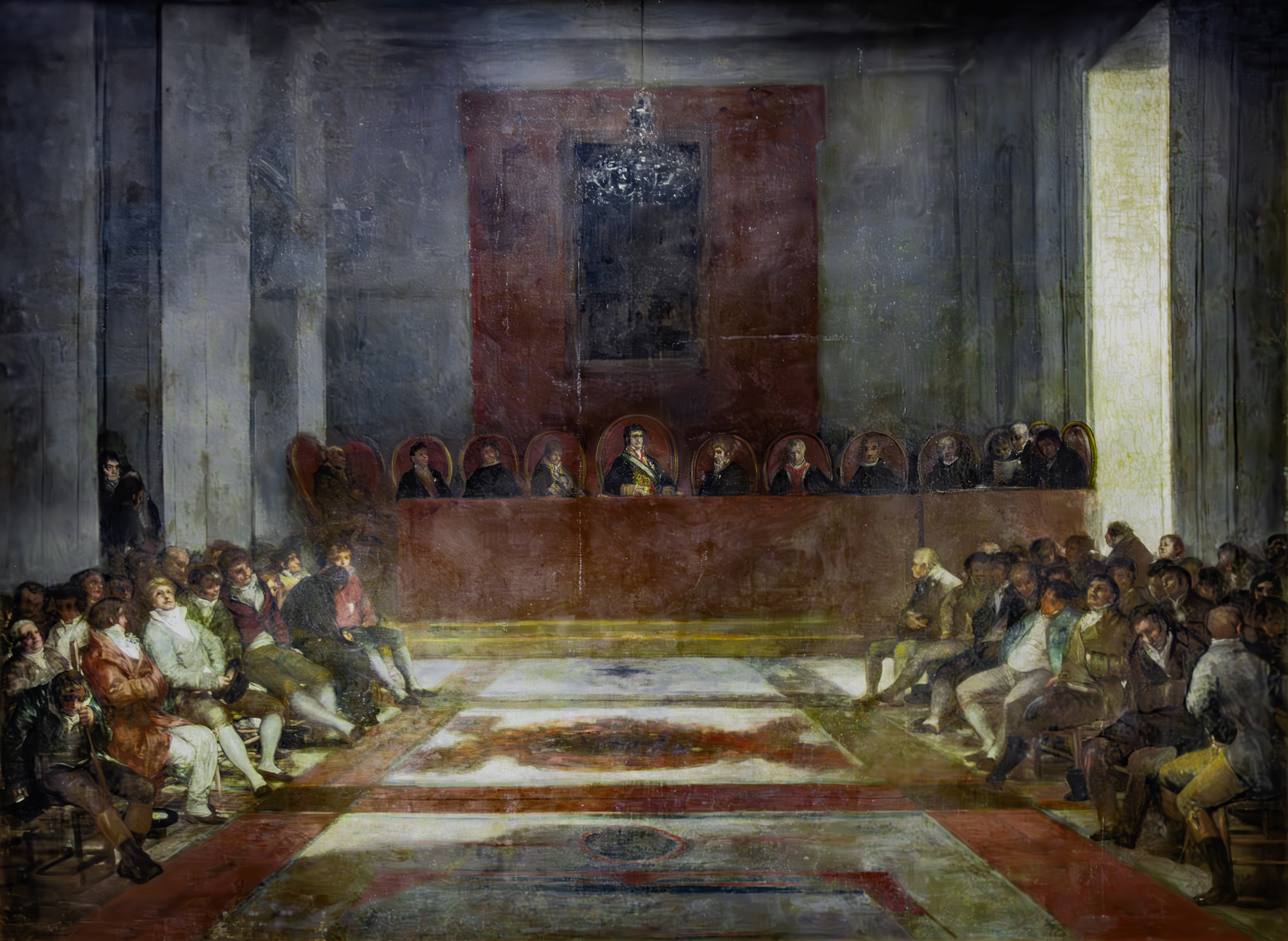
The Junta of the Philippines by Goya, 1815, 320 x 433 cm.

The Goya Museum (French: Musée Goya) is an art museum located in Castres, France. The museum was originally established in 1840 and was named after the Spanish painter Francisco Goya, because it has been specialised in hispanic art, since 1947.

== History and collection ==
The museum is located in the Palace of the Bishops of Castres, which was built in 1675 and is based on the design of Jules Hardouin-Mansart, who was an architect of the Palace of Versailles. The gardens were designed by André Le Nôtre, who also worked at Versailles.

The museum holds 5000 pieces of art comprising 420 French paintings and a collection of 612 weapons. But it is mainly dedicated to Spanish art with the largest collection in France, including 200 paintings, against 173 in the Louvre, as well as 140 sculptures, coins from Antiquity to the 19th c. and nearly 1000 drawings and prints, like the complete four series of Goya (Caprichos, Disasters of War, Los Disparates and La Tauromaquia), the Gaudí serie by Joan Miró and 83 prints by Salvador Dalí.

Its paintings range from the 14th century to the present day, with Francisco Goya himself represented by three paintings given by the son of the painter Marcel Briguiboul in 1894, The Junta of the Philippines (c. 1815, Goya's largest work), Self-Portrait with Spectacles (in French) (c. 1800) and Portrait of Francisco del Mazo (in French) (c. 1815-1820). Other artists in the collection include Juan Rexach, Lluís Borrassà, Alejo Fernández, Francisco de Osona, Vicente Macip, Diego Velázquez, Bartolomé Esteban Murillo (Our Lady of the Rosary), José de Ribera, El Greco, Francisco de Zurbarán, Francisco Pacheco, Francisco Herrera el Viejo, Juan de Valdés Leal, Alonso Cano, Juan Pantoja de la Cruz, Francisco Ribalta, Sebastián de Llanos y Valdés, Claudio Coello, Pedro Orrente, Sebastián Muñoz, Francisco Varela, Pedro Nuñez de Villavicencio, Gregorio Bausá, Francisco Bayeu y Subias, Luis Paret, Vicente Lopez y Portaña, José Aparicio, Eugenio Lucas Velázquez, Antonio Muñoz Degrain, Federico de Madrazo y Kuntz, Mariano Fortuny y Madrazo, Aureliano de Beruete, Antonio de La Gándara, Joaquín Sorolla, Santiago Rusiñol, Pablo Picasso, Juan Gris, Ignacio Zuloaga, Valentin Zubiaurre, Manuel Ortíz de Zárate, Josep Maria Sert, Maruja Mallo, Oscar Dominguez, Celso Lagar, Ismaël de la Serna, Hermenegildo Anglada Camarasa, Antoni Clavé, Rafael Durancamps, Manolo Millares, Carlos Pradal and Mentor Blasco.

The completely refurbished museum reopened on 15 April 2023 with 23 rooms on 1500 m^{2} and an exhibition hall in the contiguous former abbey of Les Cèdres.

== See also ==
- Museo Goya - Colección Ibercaja - Museo Camón Aznar, an art museum in Zaragoza, Spain.
