= Pablo Legote =

Spanish painter

Pablo Legote, born Paul Legot (1598–1671), was a Spanish-Luxembourgish painter, who flourished in the first half of the 17th century. He was born in Luxembourg and moved with his family to Seville around 1609–1610 at a young age.

During 1629–1636, he worked with Alonso Cano in painting and gilding in the church of Lebrija. There he painted an Annunciation, Nativity, Epiphany, and depictions of St. John evangelist and baptist. In 1647 Cardinal Spinola, Archbishop of Seville, commissioned him to execute for the large hall of his palace a full-length series of apostles. A similar series, which hung in the church of the Hospital de la Piedad, was attributed to elder Herrera or Legote. He afterwards went to Cádiz, where he was employed in 1662 to paint banners for the royal fleet.

== Works ==
- Transfiguration 1631. (La Transfiguración) large altar at the Salvador, Seville
- Adoration of the Shepherds (1633), Los Palacios, Seville.
- Adoration of the Shepherds, Adoration of the Kings, Annunciation (1633), Santa Maria de Jesús church, Lebrija.
- Saint Jerome (San Jerónimo) (1635), Sacristía de los Cálices at the Seville Cathedral.
- Adoration of the Kings (Adoración de los Reyes) (1640) Cádiz Cathedral
- Large altar (1640) at the Santa María de Gracia church, Espera.
- Apostolado (1647).
