= González Velázquez =

González Velázquez may refer to:

- Pablo González Velázquez (1664-1727), Spanish late-Baroque sculptor
- Luis González Velázquez (1715-1763), Spanish late-Baroque painter, son of the previous
- Alejandro González Velázquez (1719-1772), Spanish late-Baroque architect and painter, brother of the previous
- Antonio González Velázquez (1723-1793), Spanish late-Baroque painter, brother of Alejandro and Luis
- Zacarías González Velázquez (1763-1834), Spanish late-Baroque painter, son of the previous
- José Emilio González Velázquez, Puerto Rican politician and Senator, son of the previous
