= Zacarías González Velázquez =

Spanish painter (1763–1834)

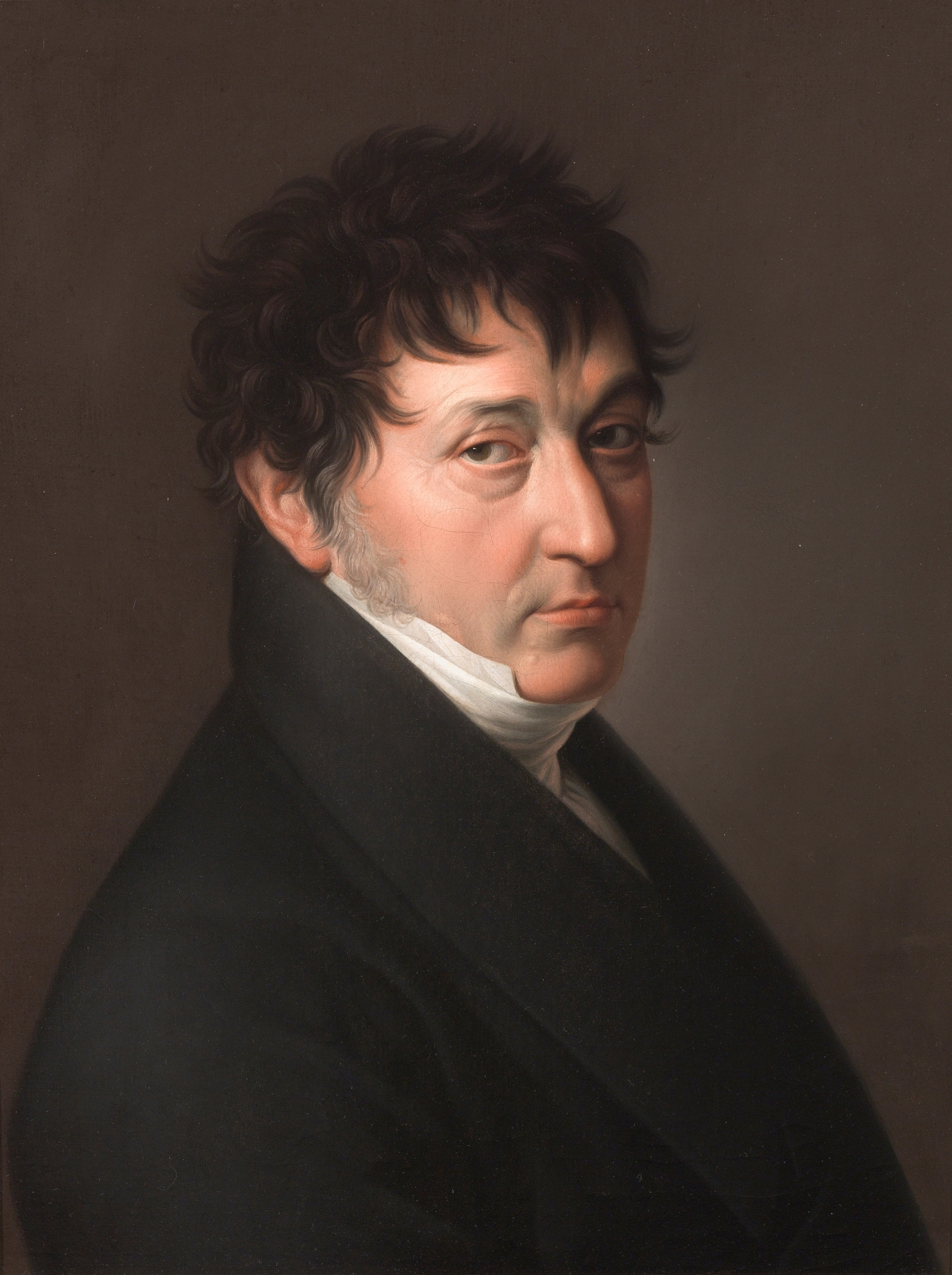
Self-portrait (1810s)

Zacarías González Velázquez (5 November 1763 – 31 January 1834) was a Spanish painter; known primarily for his portraits and religious works.

== Biography ==
Velázquez was born in Madrid to a family of artists. His father was the painter Antonio González Velázquez. His grandfather Pablo and his uncles Luis and Alejandro were all sculptors or painters. His brothers, Isidro and Cástor (1768-1822) also became painters. He began his training in 1777 at the Real Academia de Bellas Artes de San Fernando, where his father was the Director, a position he would later hold himself. While there, he studied with Mariano Salvador Maella. After his second year, he won first prize in the Second Class Paintings category.

He graduated in 1782 and began to acquire commissions almost immediately. He decorated several rooms in the Royal Palace of El Pardo, mostly with mythological scenes. He also worked as a designer at the Royal Tapestry Factory and painted decorations at the Jaén Cathedral, Toledo Cathedral and the Oratory of the Caballero de Gracia in Madrid.

He received another degree at the Academy in 1790 and, three years later, was appointed an assistant professor there; a position he held until 1807. At that time, he was promoted to Deputy Director of Painting. This came at a difficult time, as the country was embroiled in the Napoleonic Wars and cultural life came to a virtual standstill. Things improved greatly with the accession of Ferdinand VII to the throne. Eventually, he rose to the position of Director of the Academy in 1828; a position he held until 1831. He died in Madrid, aged 69.

== Selected paintings ==
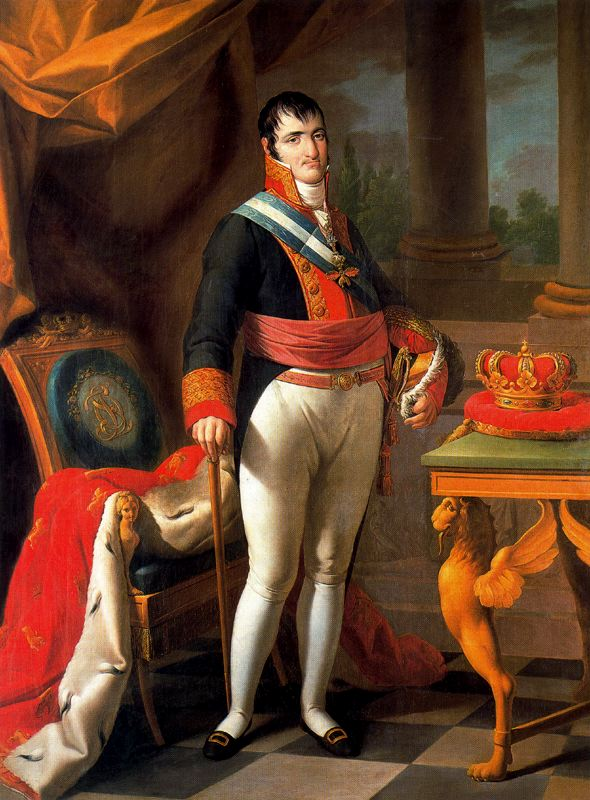
Portrait of Ferdinand VII (1814)

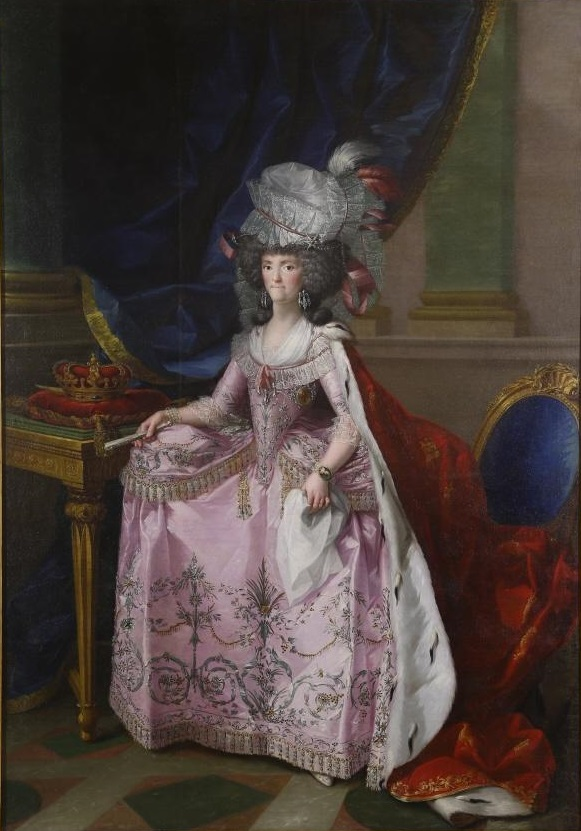
Portrait of
Maria Luisa of Parma (1789)

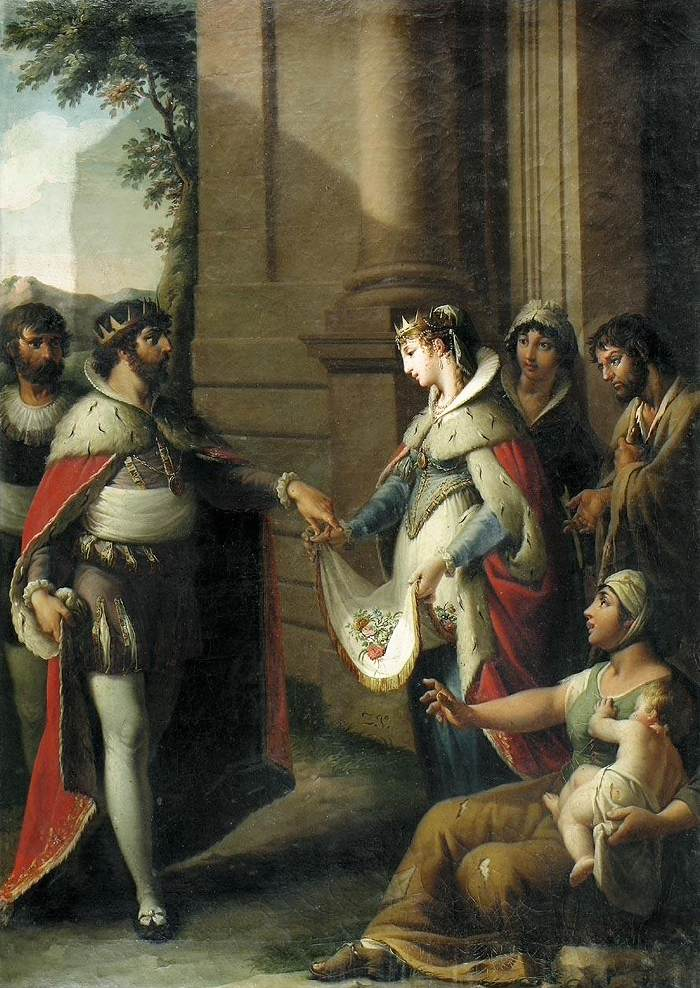
The Miracle of Saint Casilda (c. 1820)

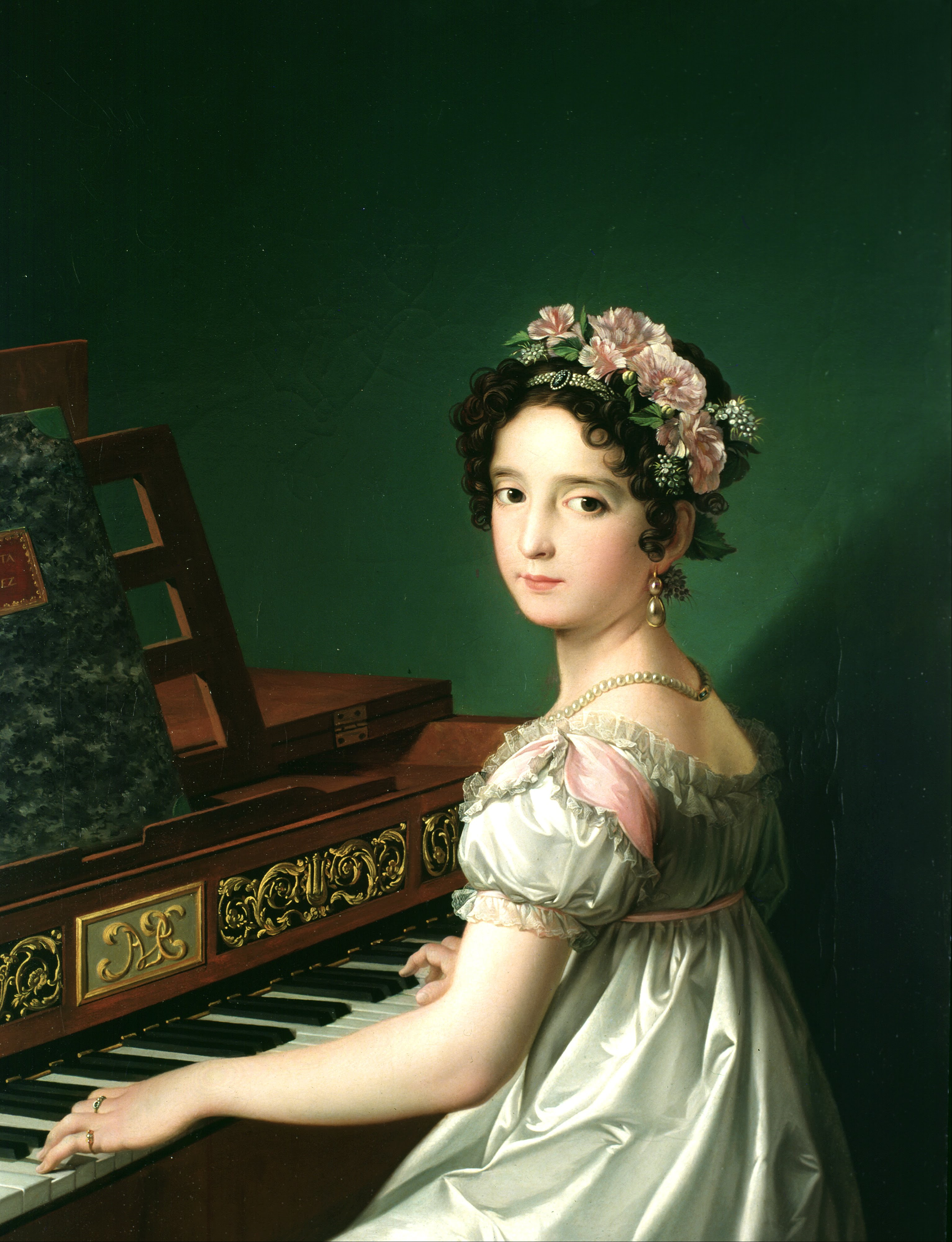
Manuela González Velázquez playing the piano (c. 1820)
