= Mariano Salvador Maella =

Spanish painter (1739–1819)

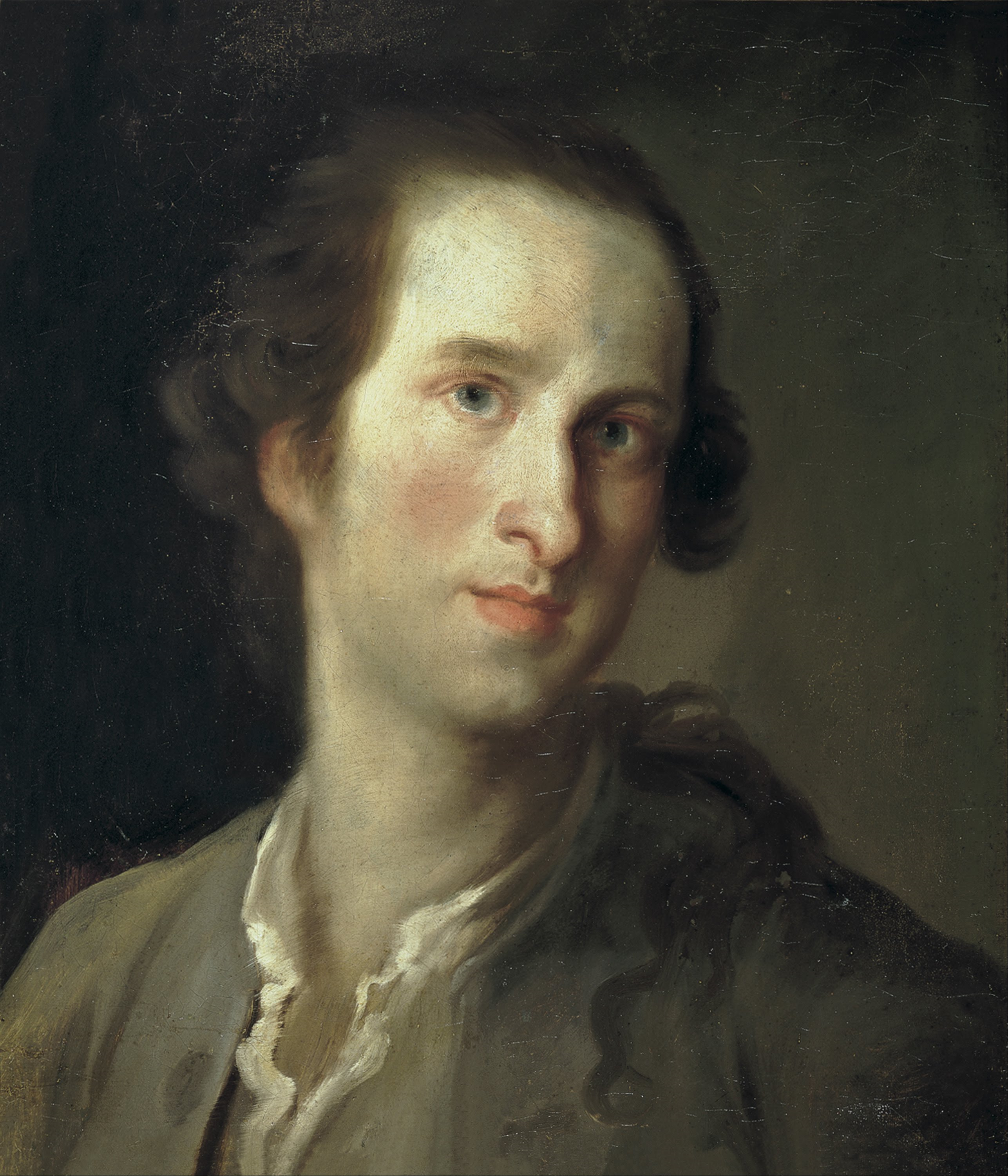
Self-portrait (early 1760s)

Mariano Salvador Maella Pérez (21 August 1739 – 10 May 1819) was a Spanish painter known primarily for his portraits and religious frescoes. He was appointed chamber painter of King Charles IV of Spain in 1774 and became well known for his portraits, adopting a formal Neoclassical approach.

== Biography ==
Maella was born in Valencia. His artistic education began with his father, who was also a painter. In 1752, at the age of eleven, he moved to Madrid and received lessons from Felipe de Castro, a sculptor who helped introduce the Neoclassical style to Spain. This was followed by enrollment at the Real Academia de Bellas Artes de San Fernando, where he attracted the attention of Antonio González Velázquez (whose daughter he would later marry).

In 1757, with the money from three prizes awarded by the Academia and the support of his family, he was able to study in Rome. He returned to Spain in 1765 and participated in the remodeling of the Palacio Real de Madrid under the direction of Anton Raphael Mengs, who had a significant influence on his style. In 1772, he created illustrations for a new edition of works by Francisco de Quevedo.

His career in Madrid began in earnest when he was appointed a court painter in 1774 and became well known for his portraits. Combining the late Baroque with the emerging precision of Neoclassicism, his technique focused on solid academic compositions and a balanced use of color. He not only worked at the Palacio Real, but at La Granja de San Ildefonso, the Palacio de El Pardo and the Palacio de El Escorial as well. In addition, he restored works by Juan de Borgoña at the Cathedral of Toledo, painted frescoes at Burgo de Osma Cathedral and created designs for the Royal Tapestry Factory; where he also served as a supervisor for the new artists. From 1795 to 1798, following the death of Francisco Bayeu, he served as Director General of the Academia.

In 1799, he and Francisco Goya were named as primary court painters and he began to work on the restoration of several Royal sites. After the fall of King Carlos IV in 1808, he did not hesitate to switch his allegiance to the new French government of King José I and received the King's hospitality in return. This eventually led to the end of his career. When King Fernando VII took the throne, Maella was accused of being afrancesado, dismissed from the court, and retired with only a fifth of his salary, to be replaced by Vicente López Portaña, one of his students. He died, aged 79, in Madrid.

== Selected paintings ==
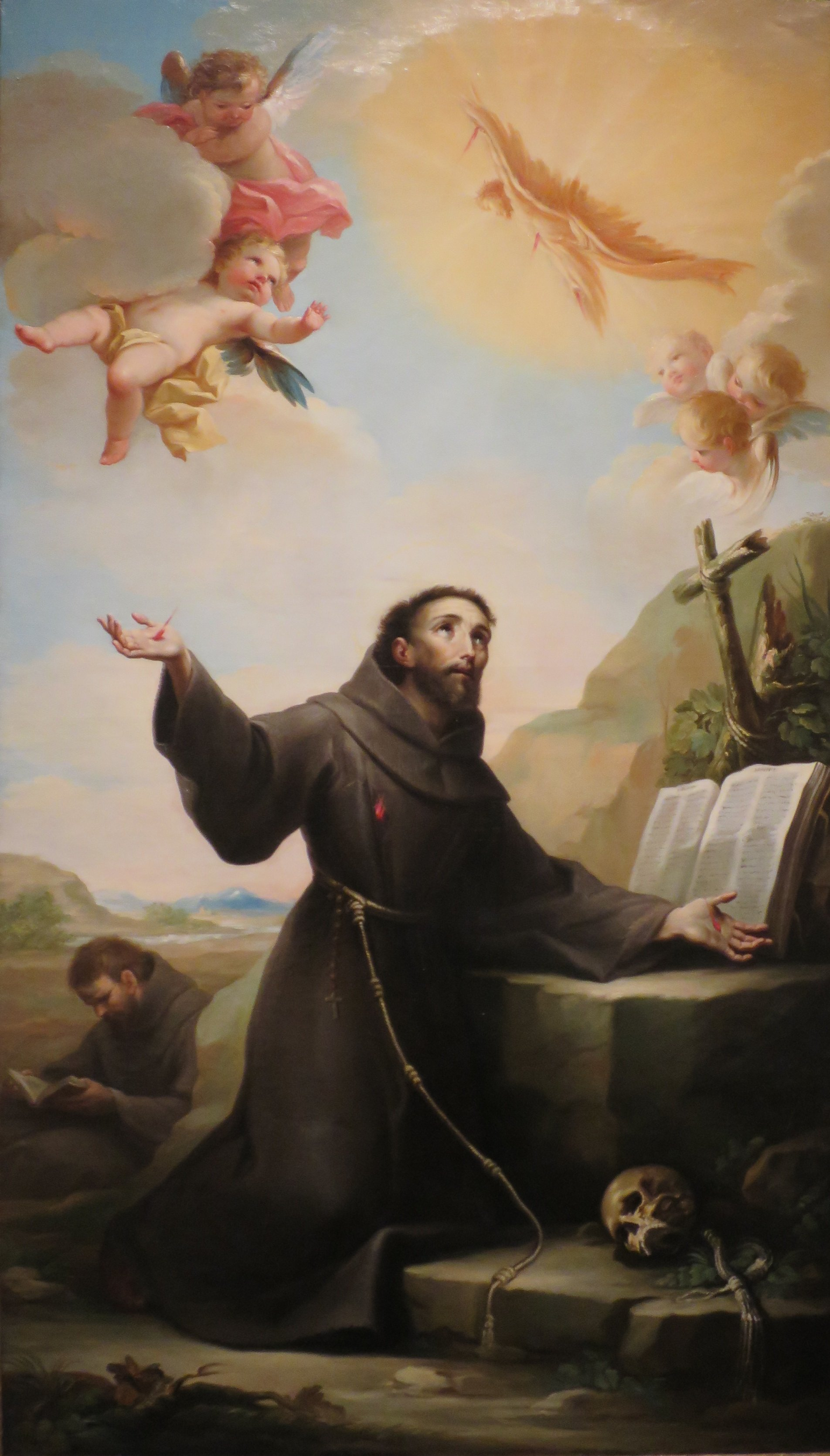
Saint Francis of Assisi Receiving the Stigmata

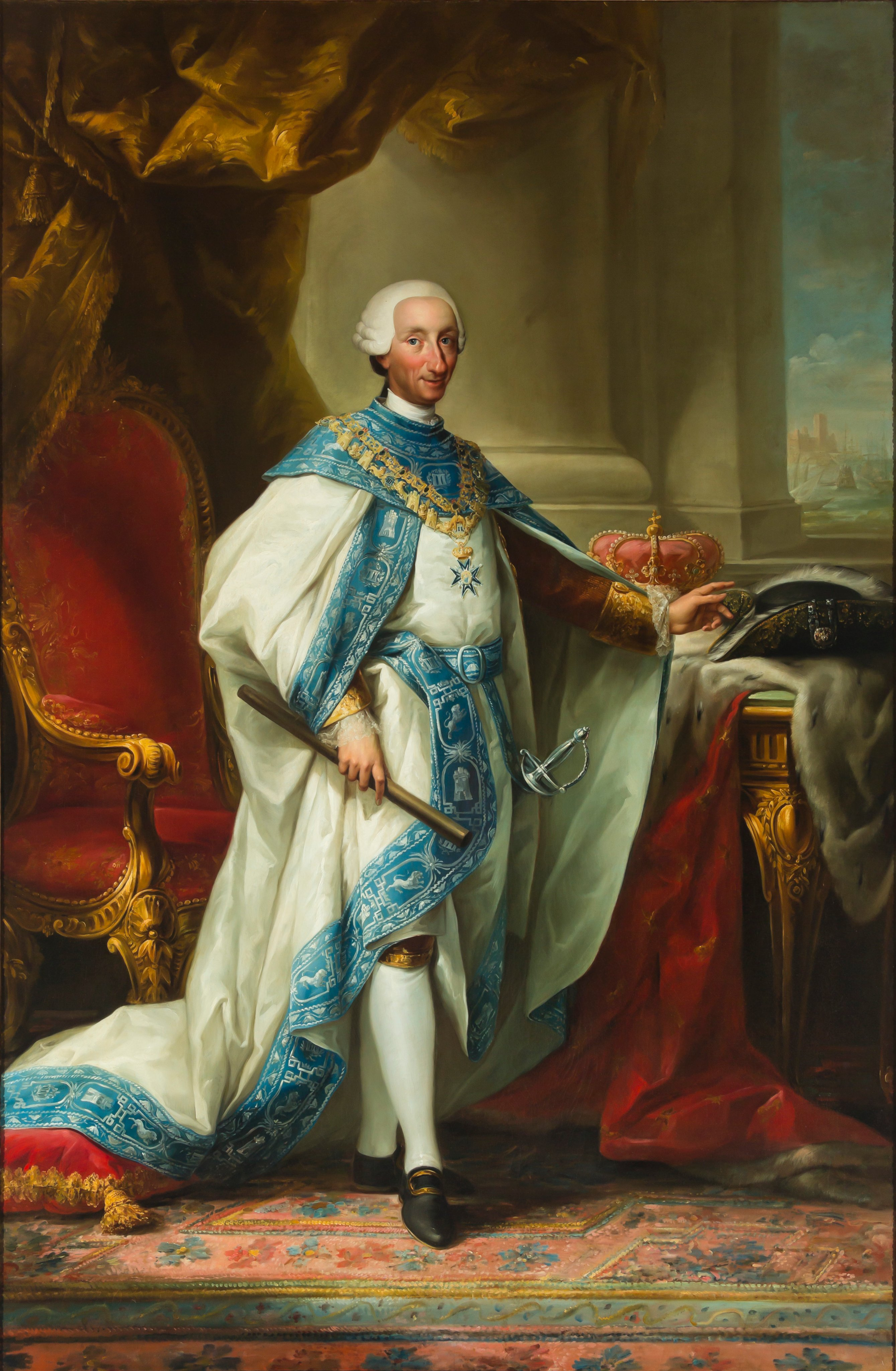
King Carlos III, wearing the uniform of his Order (Royal Palace of Madrid)

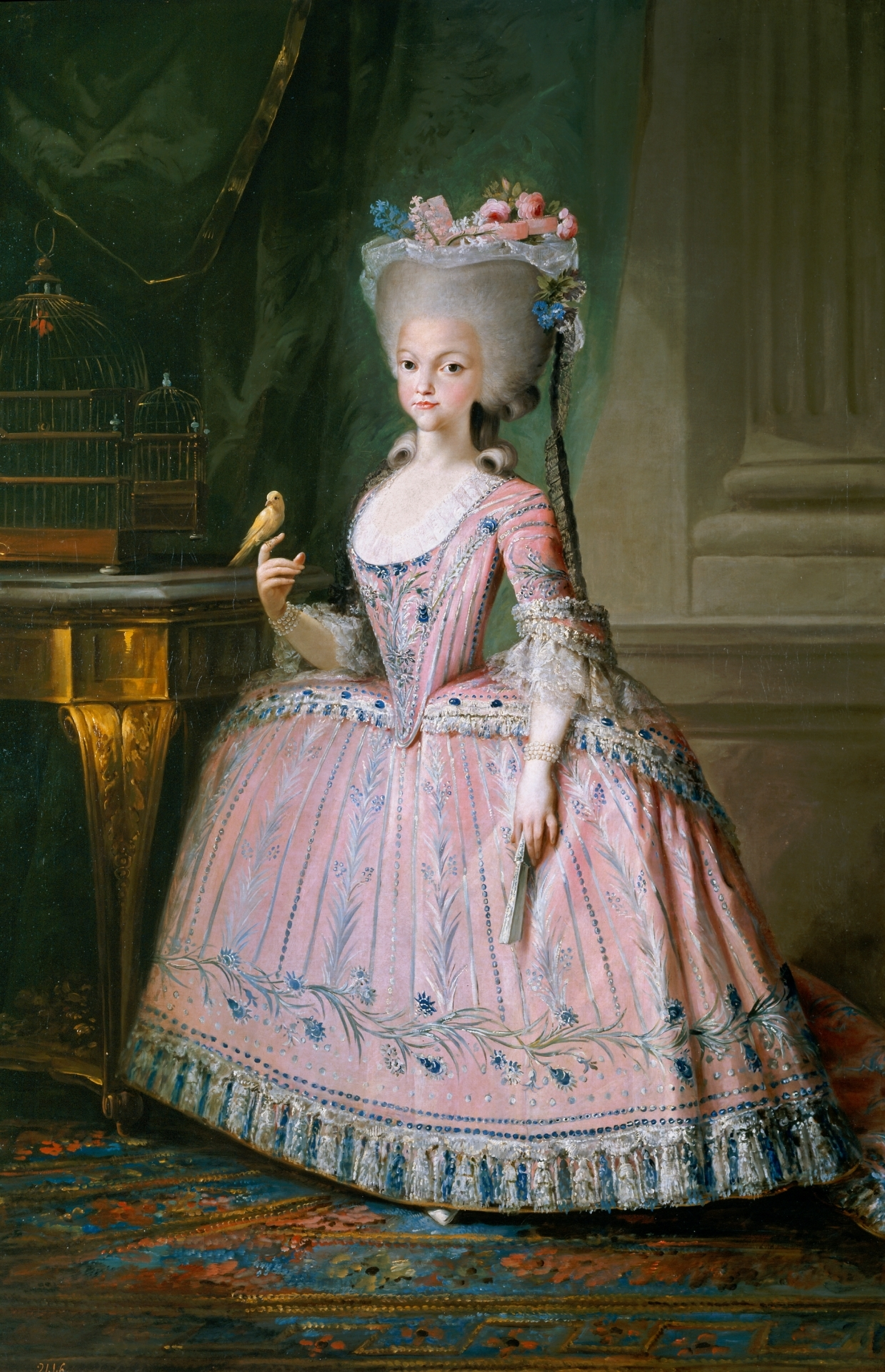
Queen Carlota Joaquina

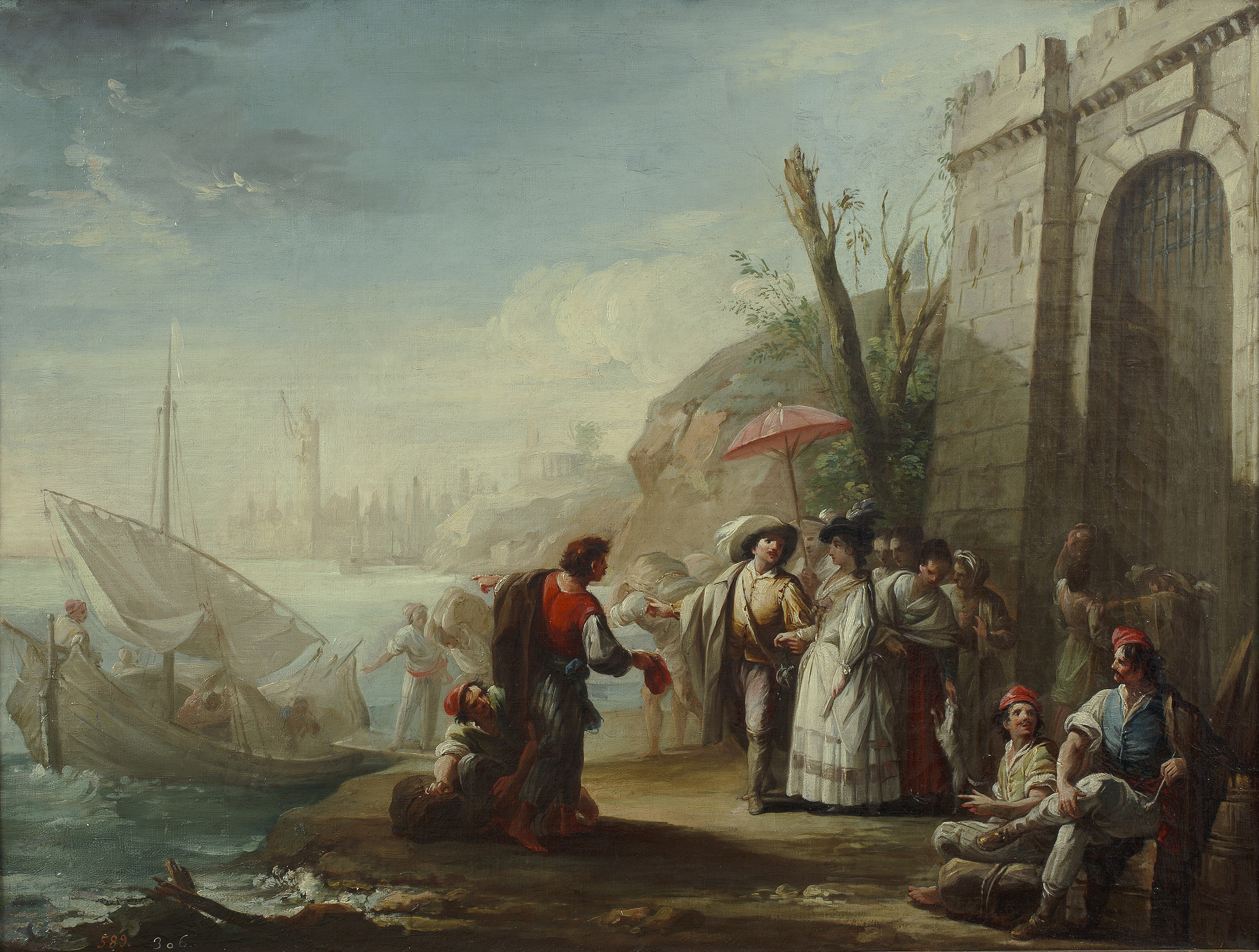
The Embarcation

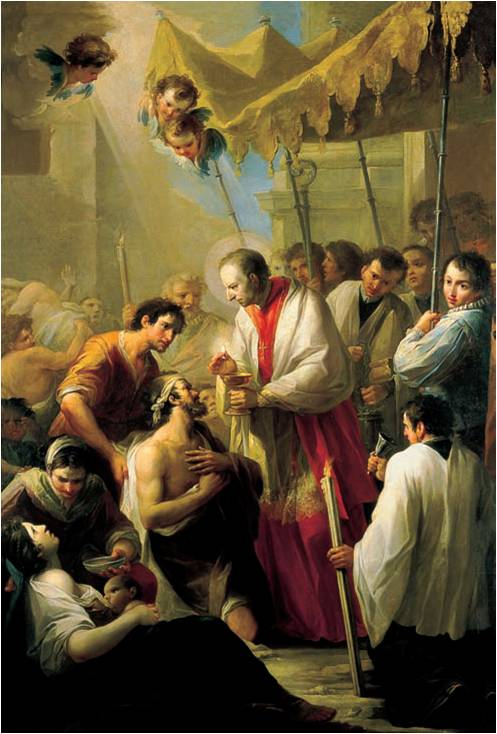
Saint Charles Borromeo
