= Order of Charles III =

Order of chivalry of Spain

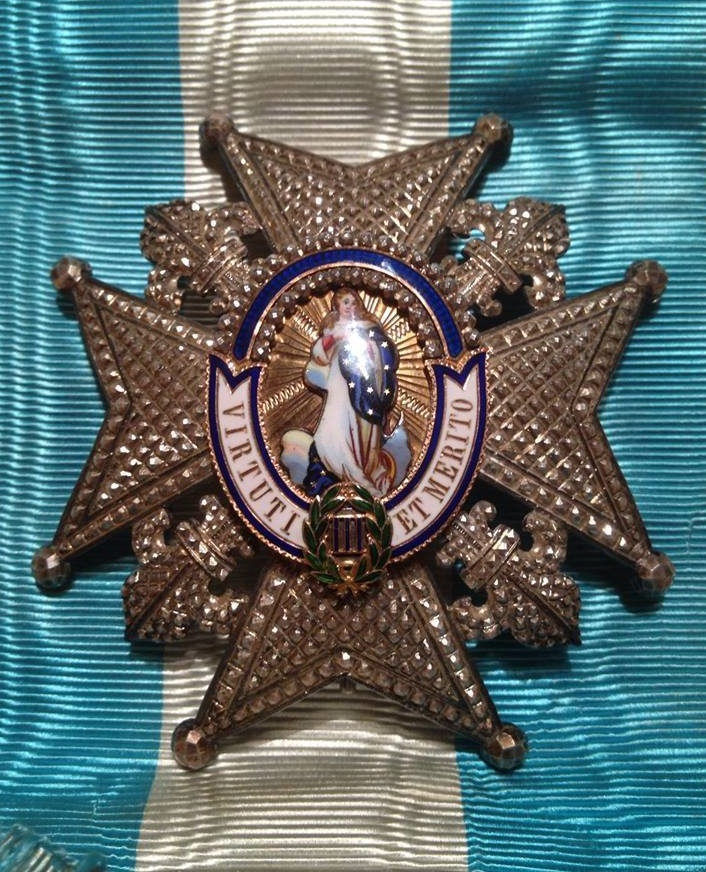
- Star and sash of the Order

Awarded by the King of Spain
- Type: Order of merit, Knighthood
- Established: 1771; 255 years ago
- Royal house: House of Bourbon
- Motto: VIRTUTI ET MERITO ("Virtue and Merit")
- Awarded for: Actions in benefit to Spain and the Crown
- Status: Currently constituted
- Sovereign: King Felipe VI
- Grand Chancellor: Pedro Sánchez, Prime Minister
- Grades: Knight/Dame of the Collar; Knight/Dame Grand Cross; Commander by Number; Commander; Knight's/Dame's Cross

Precedence
- Next (higher): Order of the Golden Fleece
- Next (lower): Order of Isabella the Catholic (for diplomatic relations), Order of Civil Merit (for civic virtues).
- Sash & ribbon of a Collar grade member of the order Sash & ribbon of an ordinary member of the order

The Royal and Distinguished Spanish Order of Charles III (Spanish: Real y Distinguida Orden Española de Carlos III; Abbr.: OC3), originally the Royal and Much Distinguished Order of Charles III (Spanish: Real y Muy Distinguida Orden de Carlos III), is a knighthood and one of the three preeminent orders of merit bestowed by the Kingdom of Spain, alongside the Order of Isabella the Catholic (established in 1815) and the Order of Civil Merit (established in 1926). It was established by King Charles III of Spain by means of the Royal Decree of 19 September 1771, with the motto Virtuti et mérito. It rewards political appointees, foreign heads of state and high-ranking government officials for their actions in benefit to Spain and the Crown.

== History ==
Although the royal decree of creation was in September 1771, Charles III did not make the orders public that would regulate the distinction until 24 October. The reason for this lies in the origin of the Order. The future king and prince of Asturias, Charles IV, had been married for five years with no offspring, reason for which when his first child was born his grandfather, Charles III, wanted to leave evidence of his gratitude to God, to whom he declared having prayed to while waiting for the continuation of the dynasty, and, specifically, to the Virgin Mary in his advocacy of the Immaculate Conception and of whom he declared himself the profoundly devout king. Like so, on the given date, when the king's daughter-in-law assisted the first religious affair with the child in her arms, the king wanted to publish the laws of concession, naming himself "Great Master of the Order" and giving his heirs, as long as they held the title "King of Spain", the same treatment and position. Although the child and various brothers died soon after, Charles III maintained his agreement, and the number of Crosses given was greatly reduced at the monarch's regret.

The orders of creation demanded two requirements: to be "worthy and affectionate of His Highness". Two classes were created: the Knights Grand Cross and the Knights, also known as caballeros pensionados ("Pensioner Knights", or simply pensionados, "pensioners"), the monarch being discretional with his authorization, although it was limited to sixty of the former and two-hundred of the latter.

Pope Clement XIV recognized the Order through a papal bull of 21 February 1772, and bestowed upon it the religious benefits, to the Order as well as its members, giving the Great Master all the capacity to decree in religious matters regarding the members, even absolution and apostolic blessing. The benefits of the members of the Order were of a different nature, later increasing under his successor Pope Pius VI.

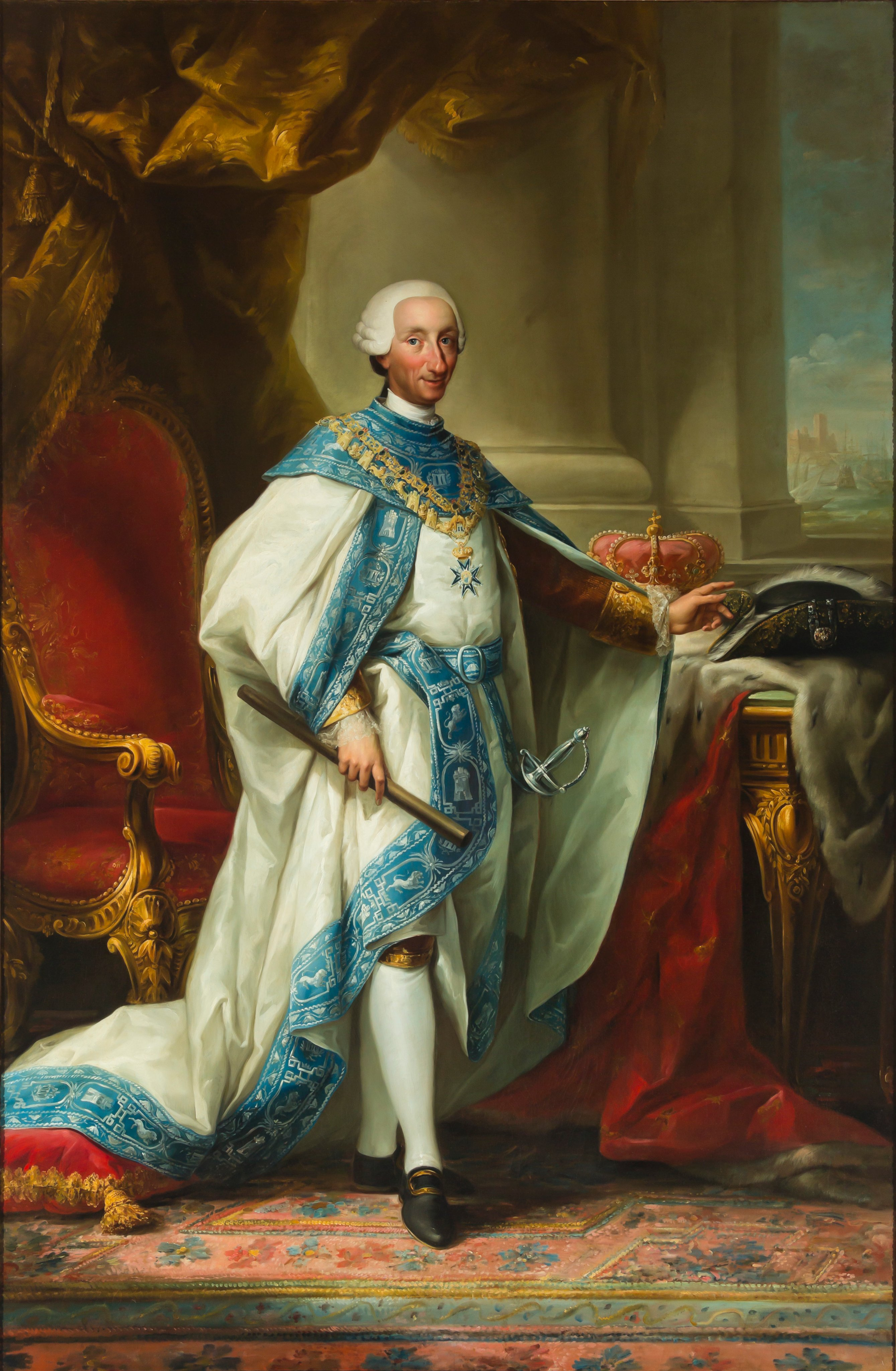
King Charles III in the robes of the order, the first design used until 1789

The insignias of the Order have varied over time, but have invariably maintained some original features: blue silk band with white design, an eight-point cross with the image of the Immaculate Conception, the motto Virtuti et Merito and the figure of Charles III. There is a portrait of Charles III wearing the robes of the order in the Royal Palace of Madrid, painted by Mariano Salvador Maella.

In 1783 the third class of Supernumerary Knights was created. At this moment the duties and requirements of the titles were specified: they needed to have "pure and noble blood" up to their great-grandparents, as was regulated by the Castilian Fueros and the other valid laws. Those received by the Order took an oath for loyalty towards the king, his family, and the protection of the goods of the Royal House, recognizing him as Great Master, live and die in Catholic faith, accepting as indisputable the Mystery of the Immaculate Conception, and attending and receiving Communion at Mass at least once a year.

The government of the Order became more and more complex, although in truth it was the monarch and the treasurer who granted authorization and retributions. The king was especially careful to incorporate into the Order theologians of the Crown that investigated the mysteries of the Virgin Mary, in some cases the clergymen being greater in number than the knights and nobles of which it was made up. The meetings were held in the Church of San Gil in Madrid twice a year, one coinciding with the Immaculate Conception and the other with the All Saints' Day. With Charles IV of Spain some reforms were made to the dress and the distribution of colours in the distinctions. The Peninsular War caused two institutions to attribute the faculty of the government of the Order: Joseph Bonaparte and the Suprime Central Junta. In the end, these were abolished by Joseph. The colours of the band of the Order were adopted by some members of the Provisional Government of Argentina to signify their adhesion to King Ferdinand VII and would later come to represent the movement for independence.

In 1815, Ferdinand introduced a new star for the Pensioner Knights, showing the reverse of the badge. The Order was formally converted to a civil order in 1847. The classes of Pensioner Knights and Supernumerary Knights were transformed into the classes of Commander by Number and Knight, respectively. The Knights Grand Cross and Commanders by Number were limited to 120 and 300 respectively, while the new class of Commanders and the Knights are unlimited until today. In 1878, the Knight of Collar was introduced as the highest class of the order, limited to 60 recipients.

The order's current regulations were approved by Royal Decree 1051 of 2002. The regulation sets the objective of the order as a means of "rewarding the citizens who, with their effort, initiative and work, have brought a distinguished and extraordinary service to the Nation". The Grand Master of the order is the monarch of Spain, currently King Felipe VI, and the Grand Chancellor is the prime minister, currently Pedro Sánchez.

== The Grand Cross ==
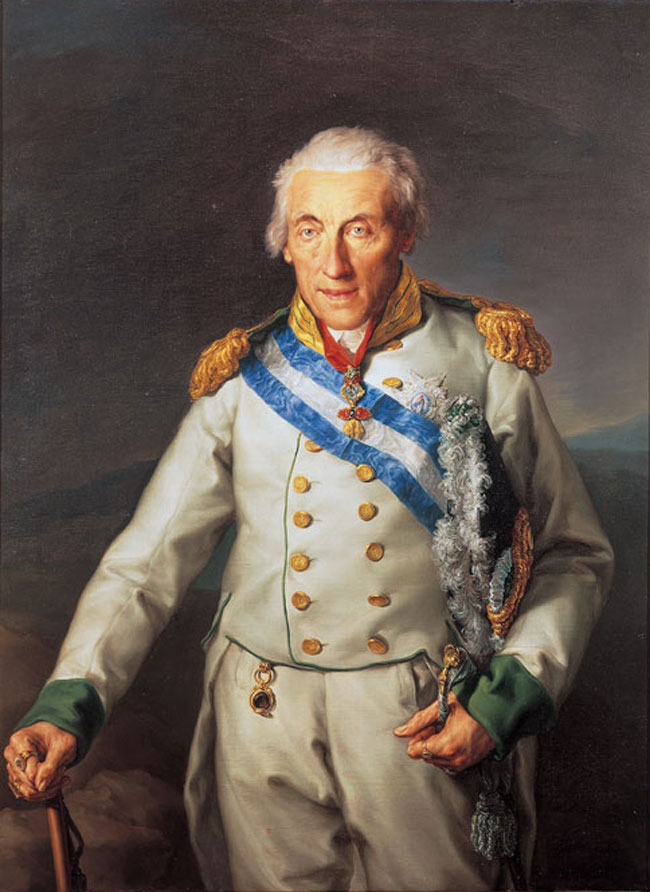
Maximilian of Saxony wearing the blue and white sash and Grand Cross of the Order as well as the Spanish Fleece

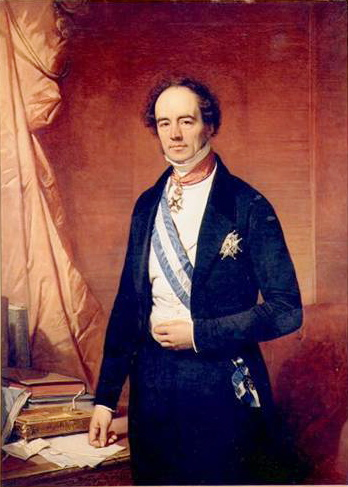
Portrait of Barthélémy de Theux de Meylandt wearing the Grand Cross, including blue and white sash of the Order

The Grand Cross of the Order of Charles III is reserved for those who, having completed relevant service to Spain, having been Presidents of the Congress of Deputies, the Senate, the Constitutional Court of the Supreme Judicial Council, the Supreme Court, Ministers or other senior officials of the state. The maximum number of Grand Crosses are limited to one hundred, not counting those accorded to Ministers.

Knights/Dames of the Collar and Knights/Dames Grand Cross of the Order are entitled to be addressed with the honorific The Most Excellent in front of their name. Other members are entitled to the honorific of The Most Illustrious.

== Grades ==
The orders are currently conferred in the following grades:

- Knight/Dame of the Collar (Collar) – restricted to 25 Spanish citizens (not including members of Spain's royal family).
- Knight/Dame Grand Cross (Gran-Cruz) – restricted to 100 Spanish citizens (limit excludes government ministers).
- Commander by Number (Encomienda de Número) - restricted to 200 Spanish citizens (limit excludes government ministers).
- Commander, optional Dame's Bow (Encomienda, Lazo de Dama opcional).
- Knight's Cross (Cruz).

Women appointed to an applicable grade are not called Knights (Caballeros). Women are instead appointed as Dames of the Collar (Damas del Collar), Dames Grand Cross (Damas Gran Cruz) or Dame's Cross (Cruz de Damas).

There are no restrictions on the number of foreigners that may be appointed to any of the grades.

Ribbon bars
Collar	Grand Cross	Commander by Number	Commander/Dame's bow	Knight's Cross

Insignia
	Collar	
Knight of Collar breast star (since 1896)	Grand Cross breast star (1878–1896 also Knight of Collar breast star)	Commander by Number breast star (1815–1847 Pensioner Knight breast star)
Commander Cross	Dame-Commander Bow (since 1983, optional)	Knight's Cross

== Current members ==
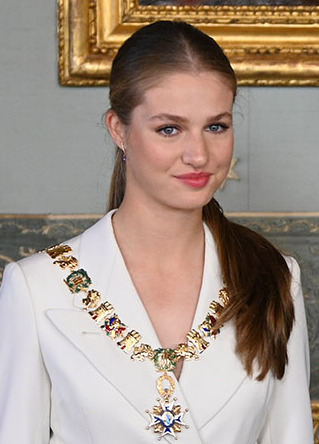
Leonor, Princess of Asturias wearing the collar.

=== Knights and Dames of the Collar ===
Yellow: members of the Spanish royal family. Green: foreign members. Neither of both groups counts towards the limit of 25 living Spanish citizens.
#	Knight / Dame	Appointment	Notes
1	Juan Carlos I (b. 1938)	1962	King of Spain and Grand Master (1975–2014)
2	António Ramalho Eanes (b. 1935)	1978	President of Portugal (1976–1986)
3	Carl XVI Gustaf (b. 1946)	1979	King of Sweden (since 1973)
4	Margrethe II (b. 1940)	1980	Queen of Denmark (1972–2024)
5	Akihito (b. 1933)	1981	Emperor of Japan (1989–2019)
6	Sofia of Spain (b. 1938)	1983	Queen consort of Spain (1975–2014)
7	Vigdís Finnbogadóttir (b. 1930)	1985	President of Iceland (1980–1996)
8	Felipe VI (b. 1968)	1986	Current King of Spain and Grand Master (since 2014)
9	Henri (b. 1955)	2001	Grand Duke of Luxembourg (2000-2025)
10	Mohammed VI (b. 1963)	2005	King of Morocco (since 1999)
11	Abdullah II (b. 1962)	2006	King of Jordan (since 1999)
12	Nicolas Sarkozy (b. 1955)	2009	President of France and Co-Prince of Andorra (2007–2012)
13	Michelle Bachelet Jeria (b. 1951)	2014	President of Chile (2006–2010; 2014–2018)
14	Enrique Peña Nieto (b. 1966)	2015	President of Mexico (2012–2018)
15	Marcelo Rebelo de Sousa (b. 1948)	2018	President of Portugal (since 2016)
16	Leonor de Borbón (b. 2005)	2023	Princess of Asturias (since 2014)
17	António de Oliveira Guterres (b. 1949)	2023	Secretary-General of the United Nations (since 2017)
18	Willem-Alexander (b. 1967)	2024	King of the Netherlands (since 2013)
19	Sergio Mattarella (b. 1941)	2024	President of Italy (since 2015)
20	Frank-Walter Steinmeier (b. 1956)	2025	President of Germany (since 2017)
