= Basílica pontificia de San Miguel =

Pontifical Basilica of Saint Michael
- Basílica Pontificia de San Miguel
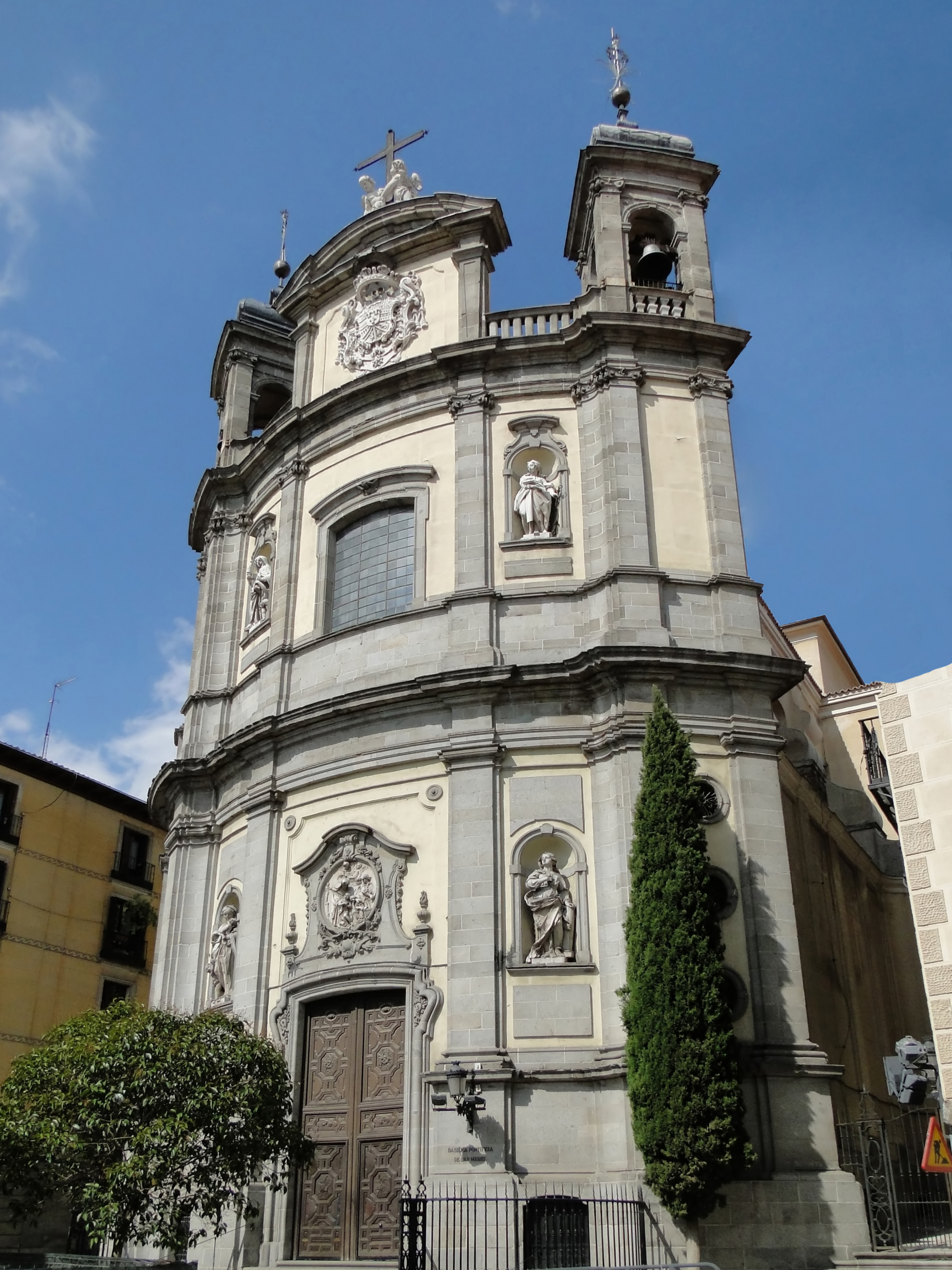
- Façade of the basilica
- Pontifical Basilica of Saint Michael
- 40°24′51.46″N 3°42′34.73″W
- Location: Madrid
- Address: Calle de San Justo, 4
- Country: Spain
- Denomination: Catholic Church
- Website: www.bsmiguel.es

History
- Status: Pontifical minor basilica
- Dedication: Saint Michael

Architecture
- Functional status: Active
- Heritage designation: Bien de Interés Cultural
- Architect: Santiago Bonavía
- Architectural type: Church architecture
- Style: Baroque
- Groundbreaking: 1739
- Completed: 1745
- Construction cost: 1,421,000 reales

Specifications
- Length: 50 metres (160 ft)
- Width: 27 metres (89 ft)

Administration
- Archdiocese: Madrid

St. Michael's Basilica
- Basílica de San Miguel (Spanish)
- Location within Spain
- Location: Madrid, Spain

Spanish Cultural Heritage
- Official name: Basílica de San Miguel
- Type: Non-movable
- Criteria: Monument
- Designated: 1985
- Reference no.: RI-51-0005004

The Pontifical Basilica of Saint Michael (Spanish: Basílica Pontificia de San Miguel) is a Baroque-style Catholic church and minor basilica in central Madrid, Spain. It is located in San Justo Street, adjacent to the Archbishop's Palace. It is the church of the Apostolic Nunciature to the Kingdom of Spain of the Holy See and is now administered by the priests of Opus Dei.

Pope Pius XI raised the shrine to the status of Minor Basilica via his decree Matritensi in Civitate on 15 September 1930. The decree was signed and notarized by Cardinal Eugenio Pacelli.

== History ==
Construction began in 1739, on the site of the parish church of Saints Justus and Pastor. The work was commissioned by Cardinal Infante Luis of Chinchón, Archbishop of Toledo, who subsidized construction with 1,421,000 reales. Construction was completed in 1745.

After the Napoleonic invasion, the church added the advocacy of Saint Michael (San Miguel), when the nearby parish church of San Miguel de los Octoes was torn down.

The original plans have been attributed to Santiago Bonavía, with perhaps an earlier contribution of Teodoro Ardemans. It was completed by Vigilio Rabaglio to Gandria. On the facade, the allegorical statues of charity, faith, hope, and fortitude were sculpted by Roberto Michel and Nicolás Caresana. A panel by Caresana, on the facade depicts the martyrdom of Santos Justo y Pastor. The cupola is decorated with frescos (1745), by Bartolomé Rusca, depicting the apotheosis of Santos Justo y Pastor.

== Interior ==
Among the wood sculptures housed in the interior is the "Cristo de la Fe y del Perdón", by Luis Salvador Carmona.

== Burials ==
The Italian composer Luigi Boccherini, who died in Madrid, was buried here until 1927, when Benito Mussolini repatriated the remains to the church of San Francesco in his native town Lucca.

== Gallery ==
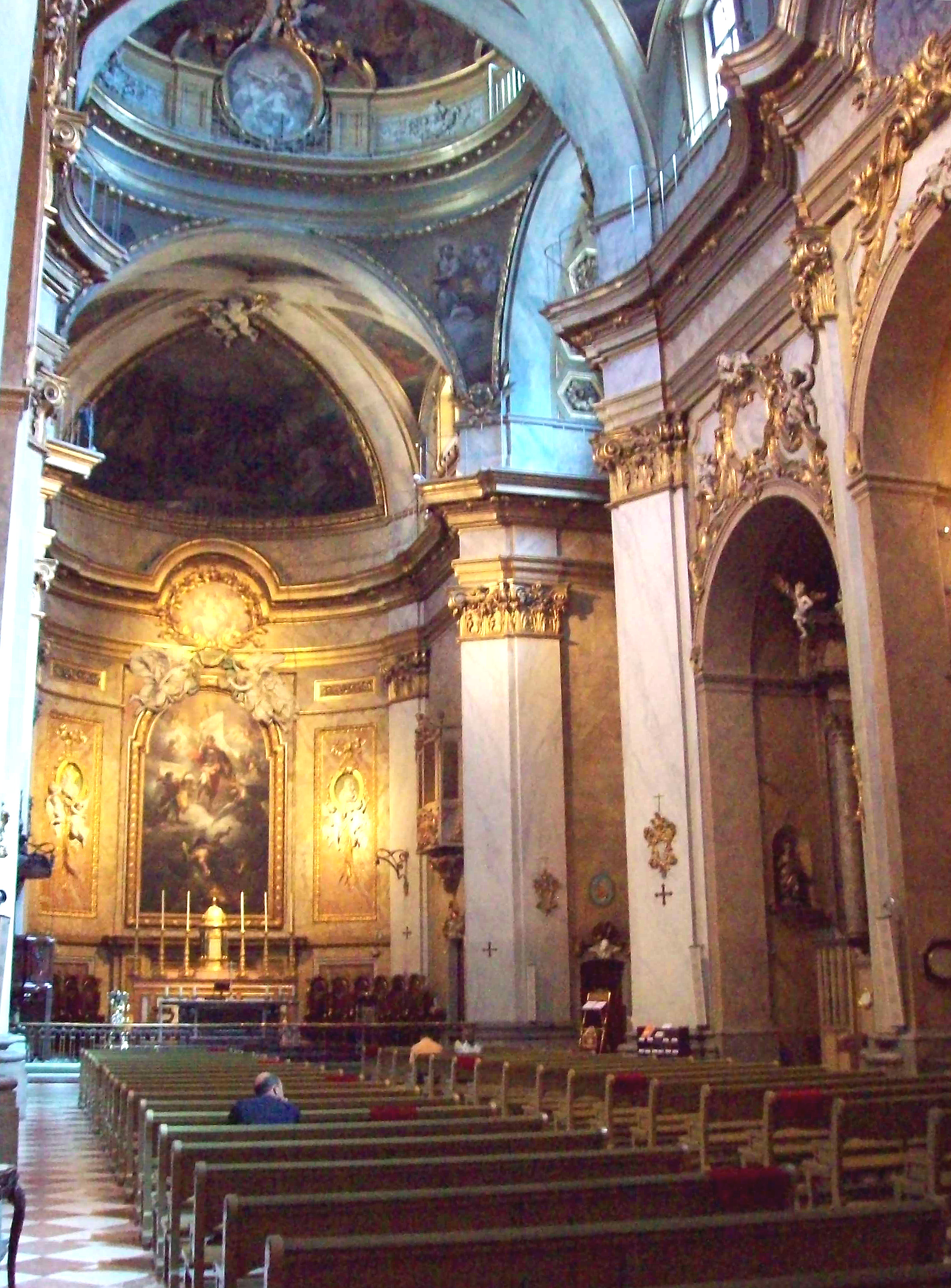
Interior of the basilica.

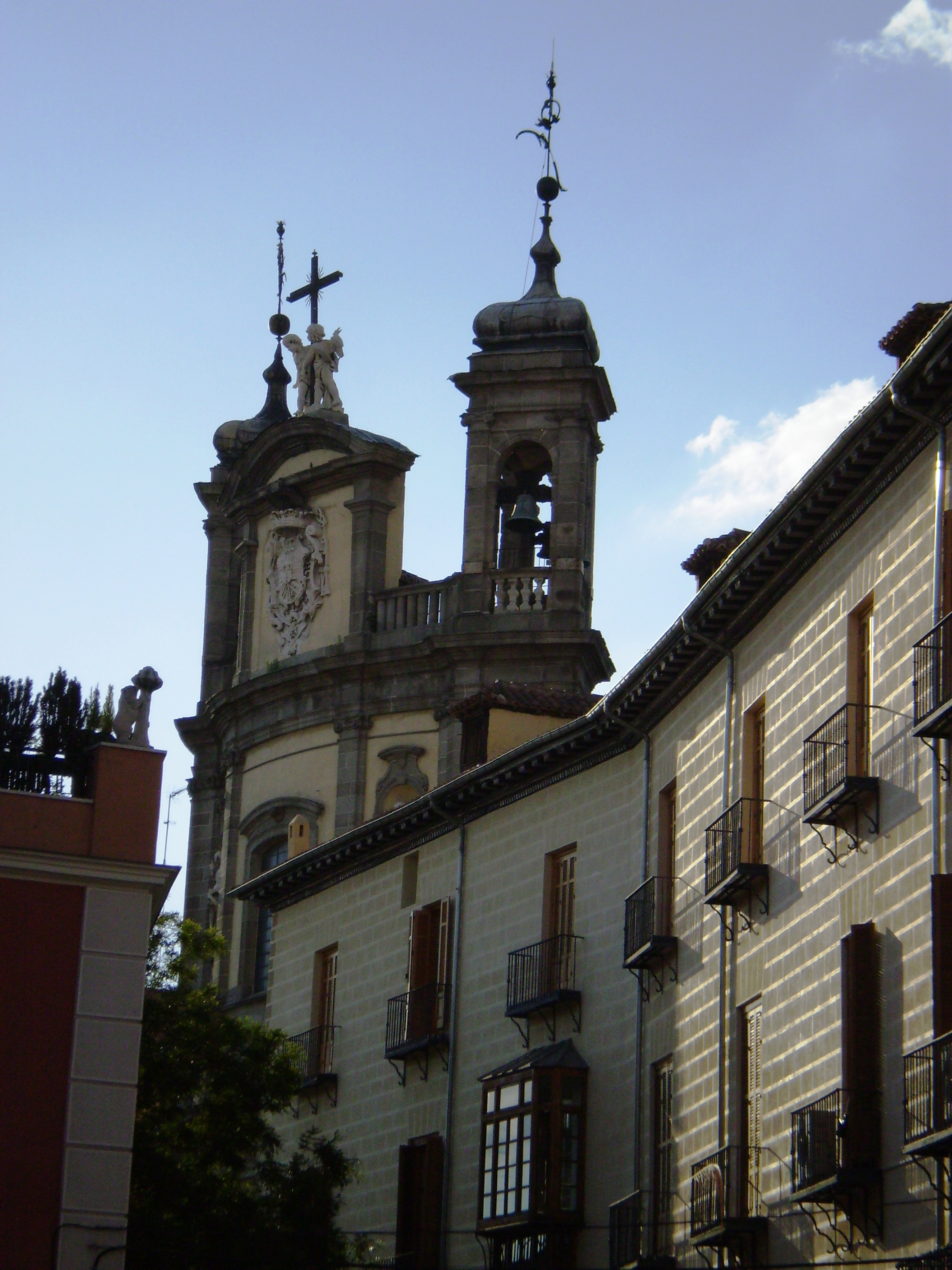
Towers above Archbishop's Palace.

== See also ==
- Catholic Church in Spain
- List of oldest church buildings
