= Antonio González Velázquez =

Spanish painter

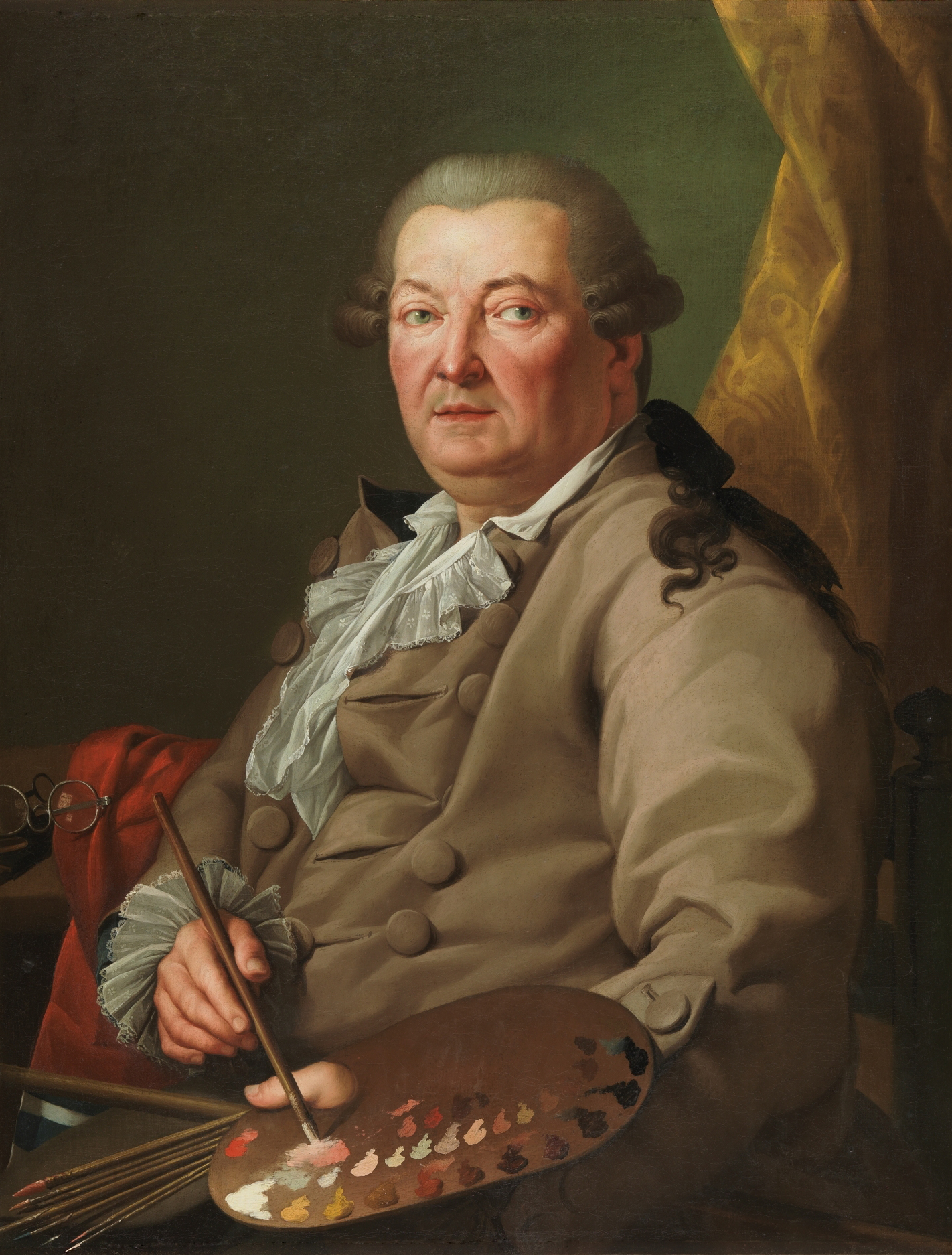
El pintor Antonio González Velázquez, by his son Zacarías González Velázquez, Museo del Prado, c. 1785–1788.

Antonio González Velázquez (1723–1793) was a Spanish late-Baroque painter.

== Biography ==
Velázquez was born in Madrid into a family of artists; his father Pablo González Velázquez and brothers Alejandro and Luis were all painters. He received a scholarship to travel to Rome in 1747 from the Real Academia de Bellas Artes de San Fernando where he was studying under Corrado Giaquinto. The following year he made the frescoes in the church of Santa Trinita degli Spagnoli.

In 1752 he returned to Spain and a year later helped to paint the walls of the church of the Monastery of the Incarnation of Madrid and the cupola of the chapel of the Basilica del Pilar de Zaragoza. His reputation grew to the point of being appointed court painter in 1757, in which he participated in the decoration of the Royal Palace of Madrid with allegorical painting on the ceiling of the antechamber of the Queen. Not long after, in 1765, Velázquez was promoted to the position of director of the Academy of San Fernando in Mexico City.

He worked the rest of his life along with Francisco Bayeu y Subías and other painters in developing cartons for the Royal Tapestry Factory under the direction of Anton Raphael Mengs. His son Zacarías González Velázquez also went on to become a painter.

== Gallery ==
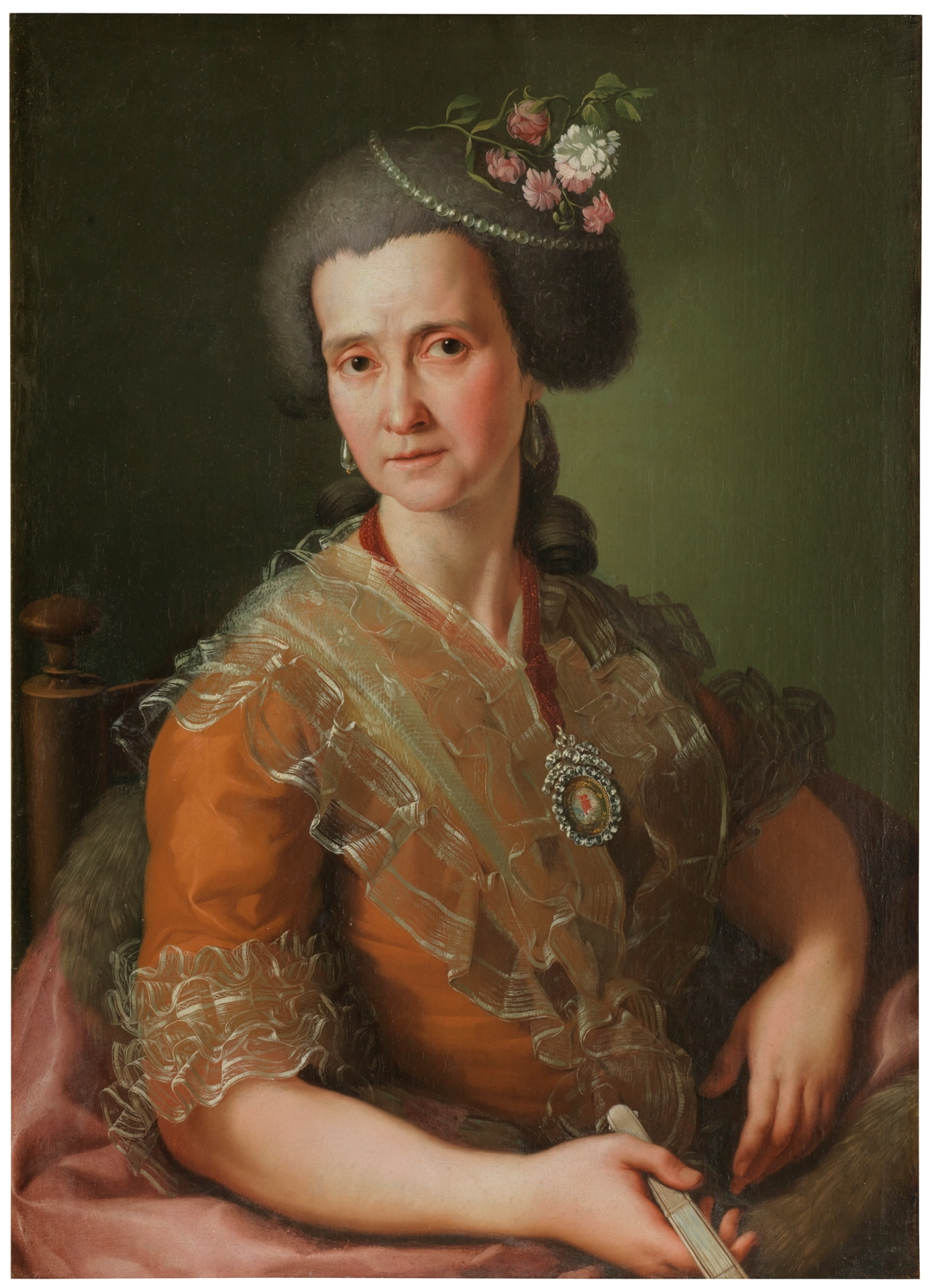
Manuela Tolosa y Abylio

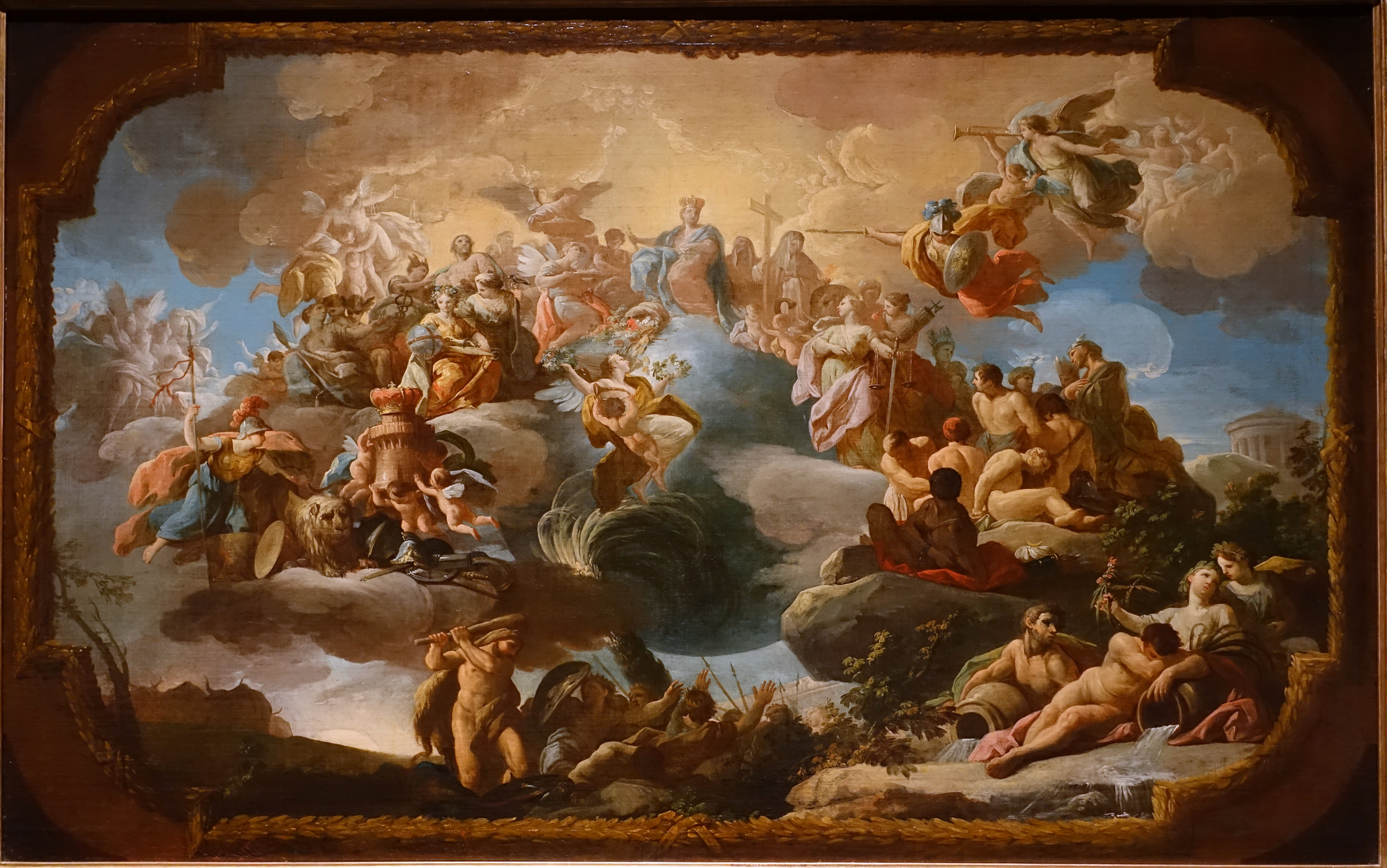
Allegory of the Spanish Monarchy

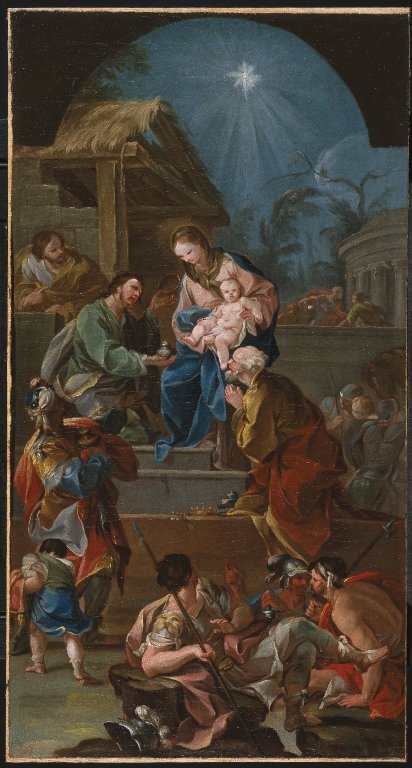
Adoration of the Magi

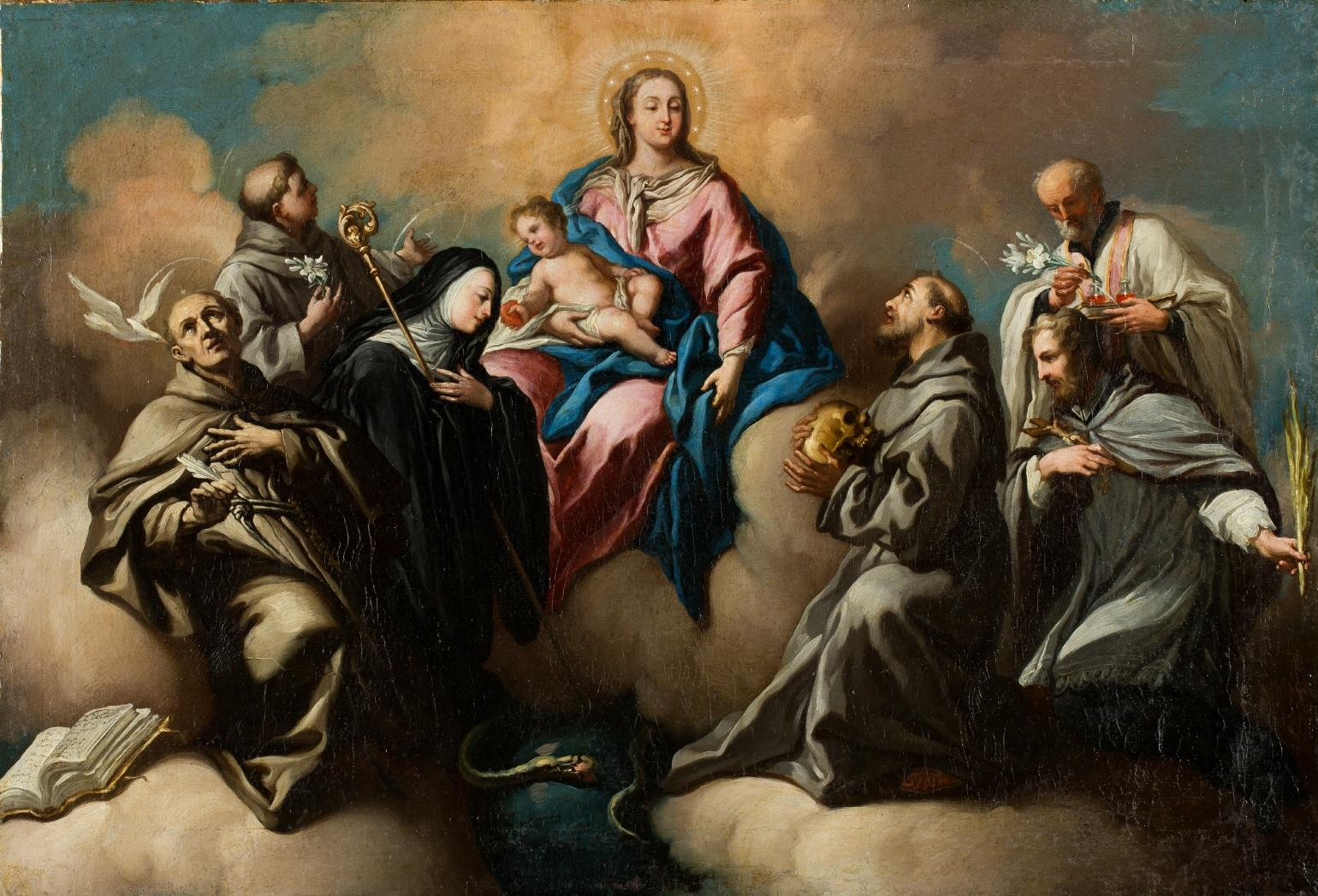
Sacred Conversation

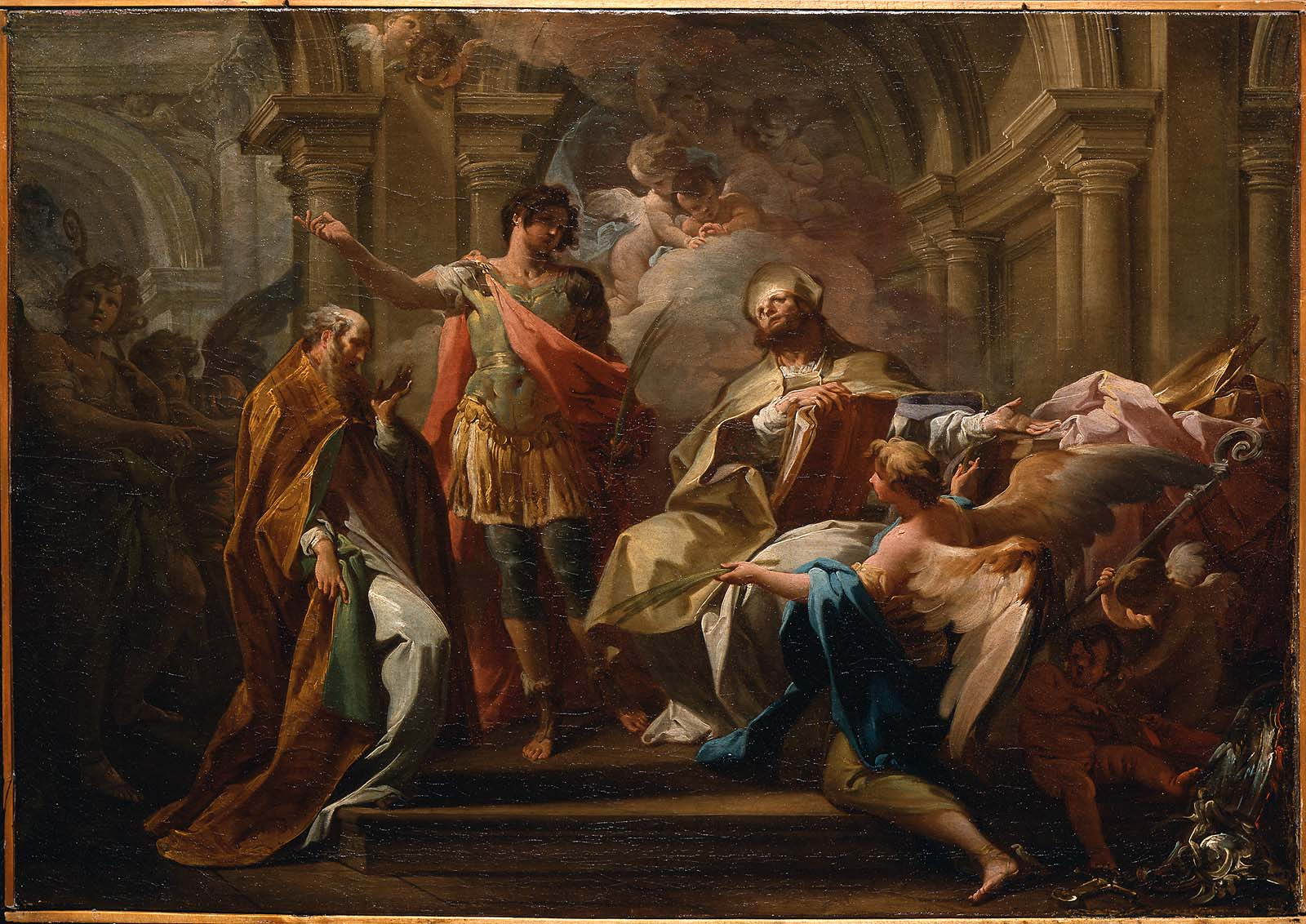
Saints Ippolito, Taurino, and Ercolano (Ercolano could either refer to Herculanus of Perugia or Herculanus of Brescia)

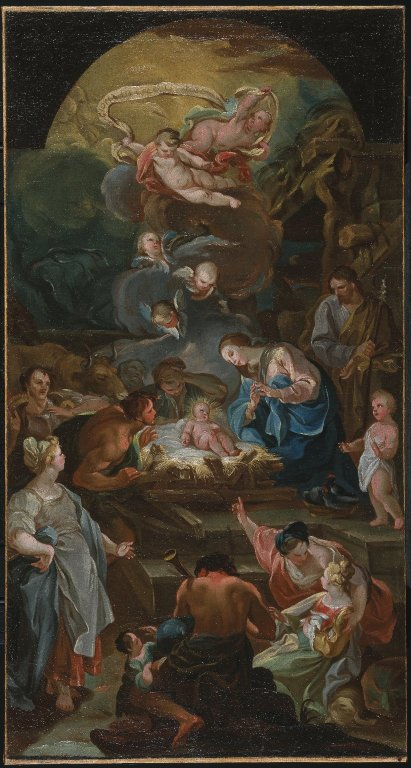
Adoration of the Shepherds
