= Royal Tapestry Factory =

- Real Fábrica de Tapices (Spanish)
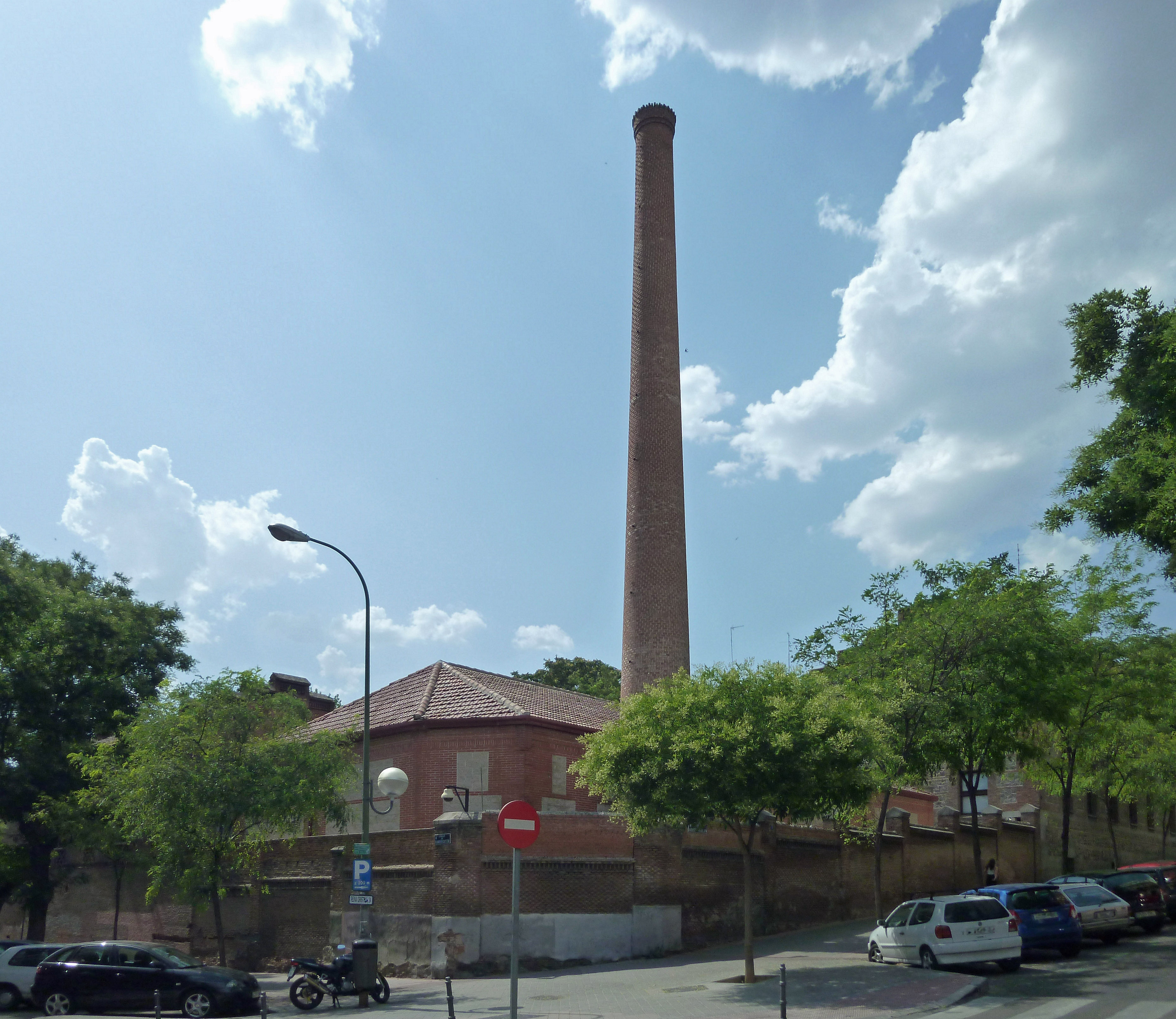
- The tall chimney is used in the production of dyes.

- Location within Spain
- 40.406069°N 3.682483°W
- Location: Madrid, Spain

Spanish Cultural Heritage
- Official name: Real Fábrica de Tapices
- Type: Non-movable
- Criteria: Monument
- Designated: 2006
- Reference no.: RI-51-0011608

The Royal Tapestry Factory (Spanish: Real Fábrica de Tapices de Santa Bárbara) is a factory making tapestries in Madrid, Spain, which was founded in 1720 and is still in operation.

== History ==
The factory was founded by Philip V after Spain lost its Belgian territories, and their tapestry workshops, as a result of the Peace of Utrecht. A master weaver was recruited from Antwerp. The project was followed by a number of other mercantilist initiatives undertaken in the eighteenth century in the Madrid area to supply luxury goods. Another example was the Real Fábrica del Buen Retiro porcelain factory.

Like its French counterpart the Gobelins Manufactory, the Royal Tapestry Factory supplied the court with tapestries. In its beginnings it was managed by Jacobo Vandergoten and his family, who came from Antwerp and occupied an estate on the outskirts of Madrid, next to the Puerta de Santa Barbara, from which the Royal Factory takes its name. Low-warp looms were installed. In 1734, his son Jacob Vandergoten "the Younger" inaugurated another factory working the more modern "high-warp".

=== Cartoons ===
The weavers worked from designs known as cartoons. These were provided by court painters. Flemish models were followed in the early years, from the school of David Teniers III and Philips Wouwerman.

In 1746 during the reign of Ferdinand VI, the styles of the cartoons were renewed, which now looked to Italian painters such as Jacopo Amigoni, Corrado Giaquinto or French painters, among them Louis-Michel van Loo and Michel-Ange Houasse, with the collaboration of Andrés de la Calleja and Antonio González Ruiz. The themes are also renewed, which now include a greater variety, developing mythological motifs and picturesque customs, which responded to the decorative purpose of these manufactures. Historical series and even a Historia de Don Quijote, which echoes the fictional characters of the novel, also stand out.

Anton Rafael Mengs introduced a neoclassical concept in the composition not exempt from the picturesqueness that were to be applied to themes of customs, scenes, types and Spanish landscapes, as a product of the influence of the Enlightenment. To this end, he was assisted by the architect Francesco Sabatini in the work of directing the Royal Factory and later (and in his absences) by Francisco Bayeu y Subías (appointed director after Mengs) and Mariano Salvador Maella. Young Spanish artists were hired, such as José del Castillo, Ginés Andrés de Aguirre, Antonio Barbazza, Mariano Nani, Zacarías González Velázquez, José Camarón Meliá and Ramón Bayeu.

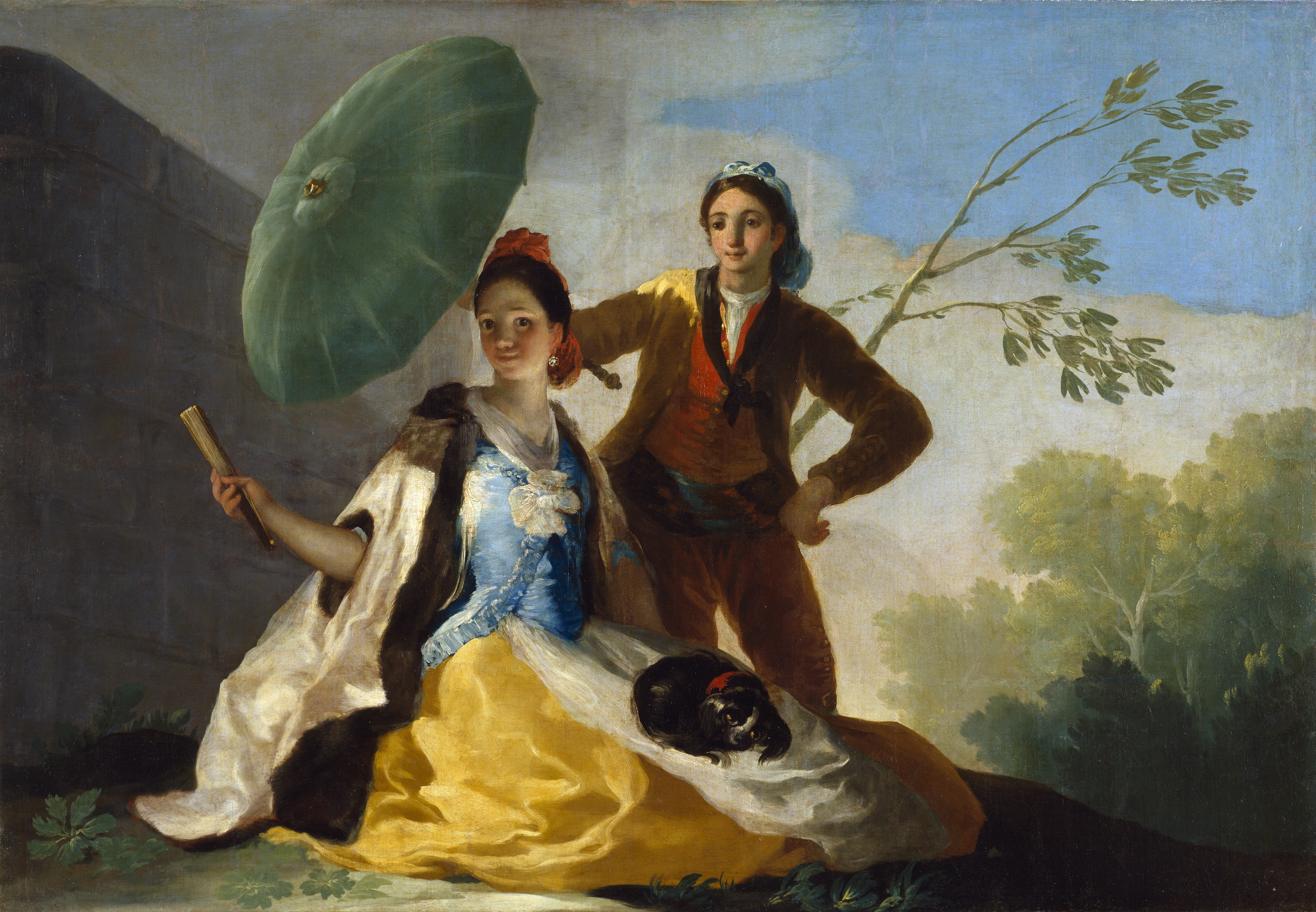
The Parasol. An early design for a tapestry by Goya, 1770s

While still in his 20s the painter Francisco Goya was commissioned to provide designs for tapestries to furnish El Escorial and El Pardo, two of the palaces in the Madrid region. He continued to provide designs until 1792 when he withdrew because of illness. Goya managed to combine in his work the styles of the previous schools and create one of his own, which henceforth characterized the Royal Factory until its decline after the reign of Charles IV and the War of Independence. Many of the Goya tapestry cartoons are displayed at the Museo del Prado.

=== The later nineteenth century at the Royal Factory ===
The Factory was awarded a prize at the Exposition Universelle (1867). However, dependence on commissions from the Spanish monarchy caused it problems in the period leading up to the short-lived First Spanish Republic. With the restoration of the monarchy, the Factory entered a new phase from 1875.

==== Move to current location ====
The Royal Factory was originally located at the Puerta de Santa Bárbara, a gate on the northern side of Madrid. At the end of the 19th century, with the expansion of the city, production was moved to the present site on Fuenterrabía Street, not far from Atocha Railway Station. The new factory, built between 1881 and 1891, was designed by the architect José Segundo de Lema in Neo-Mudéjar style. The building was given a heritage listing Bien de Interés Cultural in 2006.

== Current activities ==
In the 1990s the factory was running at a loss and received a bail-out from public funds. As part of the rescue package, the business was sold by the Stuyck family in 1996 and became a foundation under the auspices of the Ministry of Culture with the aim of providing a secure basis for the future. Although further issues related to profitability have been reported, the factory still produces traditional tapestries and carpets, continuing the three-hundred-year tradition of artisan production of tapestries and carpets with the aim of keeping alive this cultural institution and the craftsmanship of its own crafts, which are in the process of disappearing.

The Foundation also aims to conserve and disseminate historical artistic treasures and to continue the task of reproducing the designs of contemporary artists, as it did in the 20th century with works by Josep Maria Sert, Manuel Viola, Pablo Picasso and Salvador Dalí, among other renowned painters.

After Manuela Carmena became mayor of Madrid in 2015 issues came to light regarding the continued rent-free residence of the former owner and factory director, Livinio Stuyck, in a 700 m^{2} duplex apartment atop the factory. There were allegations of squatting, and an attempt to impose fines.

In 2016 the Royal Tapestry Factory Foundation avoided bankruptcy thanks to a new management model and, above all, two major tapestry commissions. The Royal Tapestry Factory worked on a tapestry of almost 21 square meters on the Sabra and Shatila massacre, as well as on the reproduction of 32 German tapestries that were destroyed in Dresden during World War II.

In addition, the institution continues to restore outstanding examples of Spanish textile art, and rents space for cultural events and other activities. As well as producing new pieces, it is involved in the conservation of historic textiles. The Factory exhibits an important collection of carpets, tapestries, and tools. The garden boasts a collection of dye plants and plant species used to obtain textile fibres, such as cotton or linen.

== See also ==
- List of Francisco Goya's tapestry cartoons
- Real Fábrica de Cristales de La Granja
