= Alejandro González Velázquez =

Spanish painter

Alejandro González Velázquez (27 February 1719 – 1772), was a Spanish late-Baroque architect and painter.

Velázquez was born in Madrid into a family of artists; his father Pablo González Velázquez and brothers Luis and Antonio were all painters. He studied painting at the School Board for the establishment of the Real Academia de Bellas Artes de San Fernando, and trained at the Italian technique quadratura. In collaboration with his brother Luis he painted wall decorations of numerous churches in Madrid, including the chapel of Santa Teresa in the Convent of San Hermenegildo, the parish of San José, and the church of the Bernardine nunnery of Sacramento. In 1652, he was officially named deputy director of architecture for the Academy. The following year, returning Antonio from Italy, the three brothers were responsible for the frescoes of the dome and pendentives of the Convent of the Salesians Royals led by Corrado Giaquinto. Specializing in ornamental painting in 1766 he was appointed director of the new section of Perspective at the Academy.

As an architect, Velázquez provided the plans for the redevelopment of the Church of Bernardine nunnery Vallecas, taking charge himself from the traces of its altarpieces, and also traces of the altarpiece of the church of Alpajés in Aranjuez, where he collaborated again with Santiago Bonavía, and the Justinian nuns of Cuenca, where he also was responsible for the overall plans of the temple and the painting of their vaults.

Among his disciples was his son José Antonio, the first director of architecture at the Academy of San Carlos in Mexico.

== External links and references ==
- Cean Bermudez, John Augustine, Historical Dictionary of the most distinguished teachers of the Fine Arts in Spain, Madrid, 1800, vol. 2, p. 218.
- Pastor Gutierrez, Ismael, "Portrait of Luis Gonzalez Velazquez ', Yearbook of the Department of History and Theory of Art, No. 1, 1989, p. 139-146.
