= Herculanus of Brescia =

Saint Herculanus of Brescia
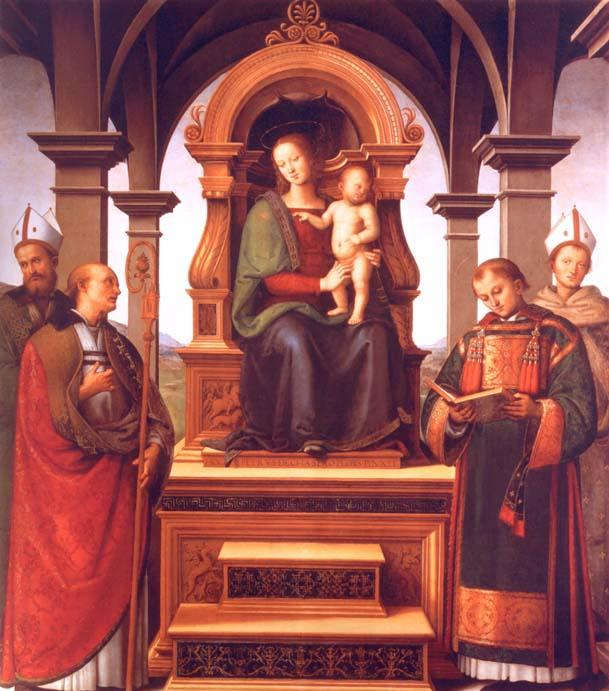
- Virgin Mary and Child, with Saints Louis of Toulouse, Lawrence, Herculanus of Brescia, and Constantius of Perugia. Pietro Perugino, 1497.
- Died: ~550 AD
- Venerated in: Roman Catholic Church, Eastern Orthodox Church
- Major shrine: Since 1228, his relics have been at Maderno
- Feast: 12 August

Saint Herculanus of Brescia (died ca. 550 AD) was a bishop of Brescia.
