= Luis González Velázquez =

Spanish painter

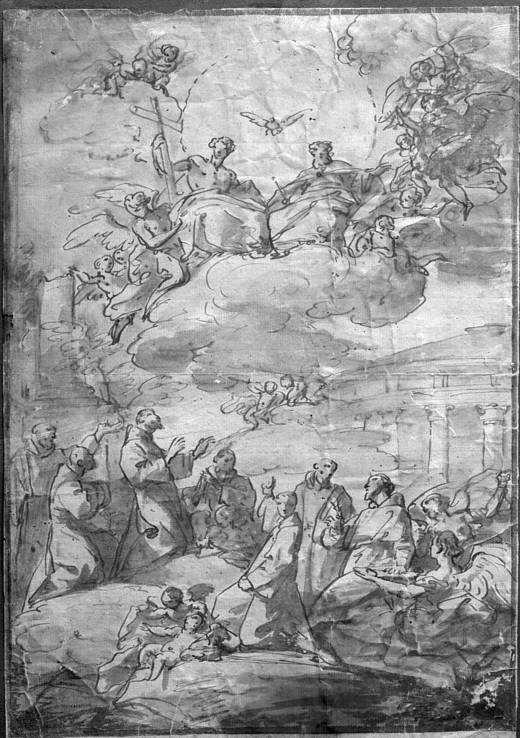
The Trinity and Franciscan Saints by Luis González Velázquez, Museo del Prado

Luis González Velázquez (25 August 1715 – 24 May 1763) was a Spanish late-Baroque painter.

Velázquez was born in Madrid into a family of artists; his father Pablo González Velázquez and brothers Alejandro and Antonio were all painters. He studied painting at the School Board for the establishment of the Real Academia de Bellas Artes de San Fernando where he was elected academician of merit in 1753 and deputy director of painting a year later.

Between 1741 and 1742 he worked in La Puebla de Montalbán, (Province of Toledo), where he executed the murals in the chapel of Our Lady of Solitude, including a series of biblical heroines, which manifests emphatically a rococo style. Since 1744, he collaborated with Santiago Bonavía in the decorations of the theater of Buen Retiro Park. In April 1758 Corrado Giaquinto stated in a memorial that Velázquez had worked under him in the decoration of the Royal Salesians. The same year he was appointed court painter, with a staff of 9,000 reales per year, although the small number of works made for the King suggests that the title was mostly honorary. Velázquez and his wife Luisa had at least one daughter. He died in Madrid on 24 May 1763.

== Sources ==
- Cean Bermudez, John Augustine, Historical Dictionary of the most distinguished teachers of the Fine Arts in Spain, Madrid, 1800, vol. 2, p. 226.
- Pastor Gutierrez, Ismael, "Portrait of Luis Gonzalez Velazquez ', Yearbook of the Department of History and Theory of Art, No. 1, 1989, p. 139-146.
- Scholarly articles in English about Luis González Velázquez @ the Spanish Old Masters Gallery
