= Santiago Bonavía =

Italian architect and painter

Giacomo Bonavia
- Born: 1695; Piacenza
- Died: 1759 (aged 63–64); Aranjuez
- Occupation: Architect
- Practice: Santiago Bonavía
- Buildings: Pontifical Basilica of Saint Michael
- Projects: Royal Palace of Aranjuez

Santiago Bonavía (Italian: Giacomo Bonavia) (1695–1759) was an Italian architect and painter who was active in Spain during the 18th century.

Called in 1731 by King Philip V of Spain, Cardinal Infante Luis de Chinchón commissioned him in 1739 the construction in Madrid of the Church of Sts. Justus and Pastor, today's Pontifical Basilica of Saint Michael.

Bonavia was member of the Real Academia de Bellas Artes de San Fernando since its creation by royal decree in 1744. He became director of the Architecture department in 1753.

== List of works ==
- Pontifical Basilica of Saint Michael
- Royal Palace of Aranjuez
