= Pablo González Velázquez =

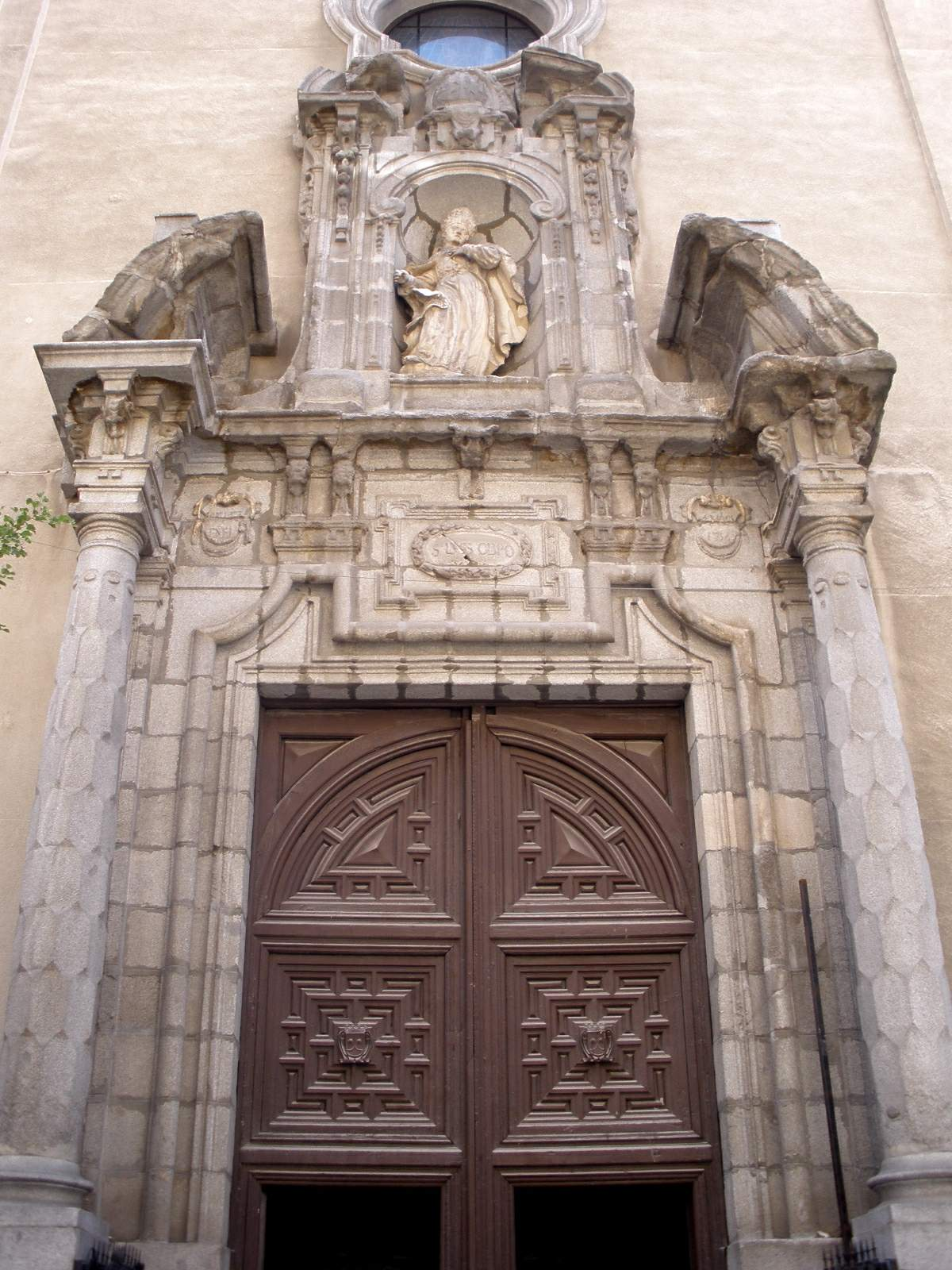
Facade of the Church of Carmen Calzado in Madrid, Spain by Pablo González Velázquez

Pablo González Velázquez (1664–1727) was a Spanish Baroque sculptor.

According to the art historian Juan Agustín Ceán Bermúdez, who is the provider of all known biographical details, Velázquez was born in Jaén and was the head of a family of artists; his sons Antonio González Velázquez, Alejandro and Luis were all painters. He moved to Madrid, where he raised his family and worked for the rest of his life.

Of the various works in stone and wood church Ceán attributed in Madrid, the only one that remains is the statue of San Luis executed for the original cover of the local church (1716), moved to the foot of the Carmelite church after the demolition of the old temple, and the sculptures of the Calatravas altarpiece, which according to historian Antonio Bonet Correa must, however, be also attributed to the whole José Benito de Churriguera altarpiece.

Ceán also believed the sculptures of St. Joachim and St. Anne's old school of the Irish in the Calvary Street, statues that were given up for lost in 1936 but which would be incorporated into the National Sculpture Museum (Valladolid) from Artistic Recovery Service with attribution to Juan de Juni, is precisely the characteristic of this sculptor, which could also include some other work attributed as the sculptures of Saint Zacharias and Saint Elizabeth preserved in the church of the Venerable Third Order of Madrid.

== External links and references ==
- Bonet Correa, Antonio, "The church altarpieces Calatravas Madrid" Spanish Art Archive, 1962, p. 21.
- Cean Bermudez, John Augustine, Historical Dictionary of the most distinguished teachers of the Fine Arts in Spain, Madrid, 1800, vol. 2, p. 227.
- Martín González, Juan José, Baroque Sculpture in Spain 1600/1770, Madrid, Chair, 1983, ISBN 84-376-0392-7, p. 378-379.
- Urrea Fernandez, Jesus, "A proposal for the sculptor Pablo González Velázquez 'BSAA (1977), p. 484.
