= Santuario de San Jose =

Roman Catholic church in Mandaluyong, Philippines

Santuario de San José Parish
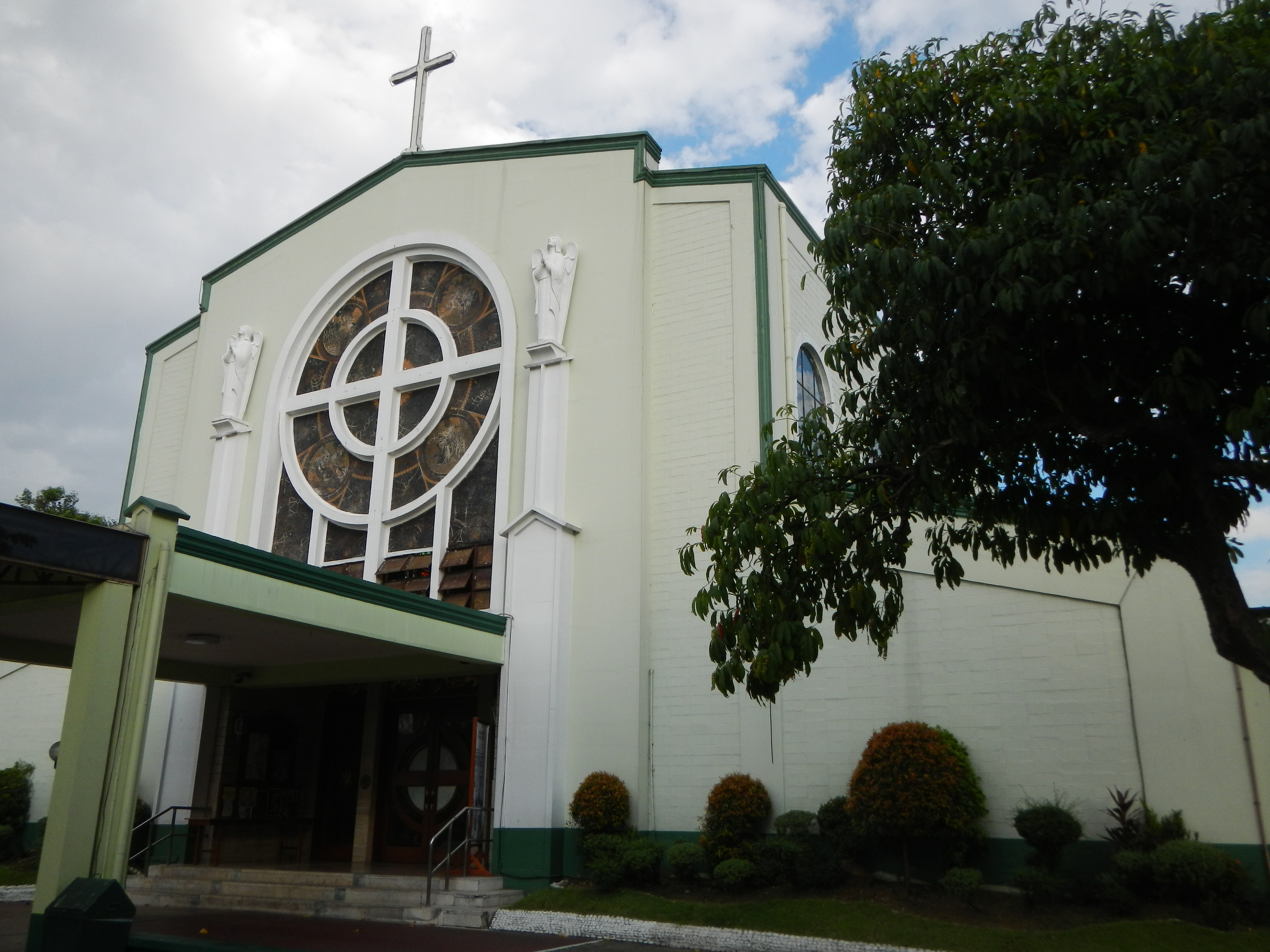
- Church facade in March 2013
- Santuario de San José Parish
- 14°36′01″N 121°03′11″E
- Location: East Greenhills, Mandaluyong
- Country: Philippines
- Denomination: Roman Catholic
- Religious institute: Oblates of St. Joseph
- Website: Santuario de San Jose

History
- Status: Parish church
- Dedication: Saint Joseph
- Consecrated: April 2, 1966

Architecture
- Architectural type: Church building
- Style: Modern
- Groundbreaking: 1964
- Completed: 1966

Specifications
- Materials: Sand, gravel, cement, mortar and steel

Administration
- Archdiocese: Manila
- Deanery: Saint John the Baptist
- Parish: San Jose

Clergy
- Rector: Allen Vic B. Cartagena, OSJ

Santuario de San José Parish (Sanctuary of Saint Joseph) is a parish church found inside the Green Hills East Village in Mandaluyong, Philippines. It is designated as the Shrine of Saint Joseph the Patriarch, and is under the jurisdiction of the Archdiocese of Manila. The church is run by the Oblates of St. Joseph (OSJ). It is the home parish of different chapels: the Holy Family Chapel (inside the Greenhills Shopping Center) and the two chapels of Crame, Immaculate Conception and Sacred Heart.

It is named after its principal patron, St. Joseph, husband of Mary. Secondary patron saints include St. Joseph Marello, founder of the Oblates of St. Joseph, and the Sacred Heart of Jesus.

Its principal feast day is on March 19, the Solemnity of St. Joseph, Husband of the Blessed Virgin Mary. Secondary feasts include the Solemnity of the Sacred Heart of Jesus and the feast day of St. Joseph Marello.

== History ==
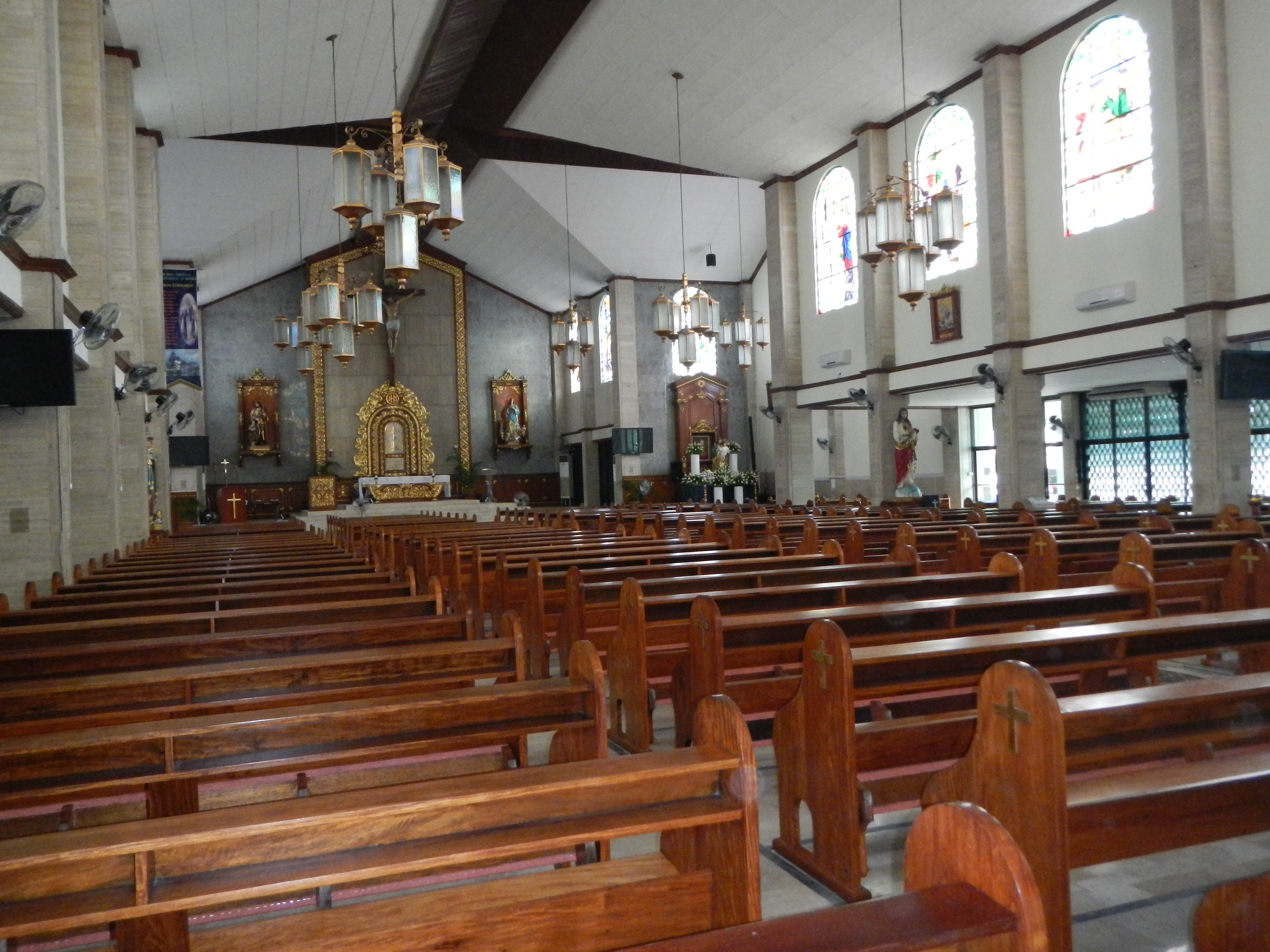
Church interior in 2013

During the 1960s, the Ortigas Company donated 5,030 square metres (54,100 sq ft) of hilly land in what is now Greenhills to the Archdiocese of Manila for the building of a semi-concrete church. Fr. Guido Coletti, OSJ was given the task to build the church. He would travel all the way from Batangas City, where he was assigned, to seek financial support for the project. For the first few months, Fr. Guido was not able to produce money even from those who pledged.

In March 1964, Fr. Guido was able to gather ₱827,000.00. The construction took 25 months to finish. Architect Manuel Mañosa, Jr. visualized the building and Nemesio Montenegro of Taal, Batangas gave it structural form and substance.

The newly built church, with the seminary and rectory behind it, was consecrated on April 2, 1966. The first Misa de Gallo and all Sunday Masses were held inside the unfinished church.

In March 1967, it became a parish with an initial 3,500 congregants from the Wack-Wack and White Plains subdivisions and from some areas near Camp Crame. Fr. Guido was assigned as the first parish priest. People began to flock the parish for weddings and baptisms.

In June 1989, Fr. Constantino Conti, OSJ succeeded Fr. Guido, who became assistant parish priest with the help of the other priests from the Oblates of St. Joseph in Batangas. When Fr. Guido died in November 1996, he was replaced by Fr. Napoleon G. Jinon, OSJ.

Santuario de San José now has over 100,000 parishioners. The laity and the birth of different religious organizations gave significant contribution in the propagation of faith through their evangelization, catechism, charitable projects and other various activities.

== Parish leadership & administration ==
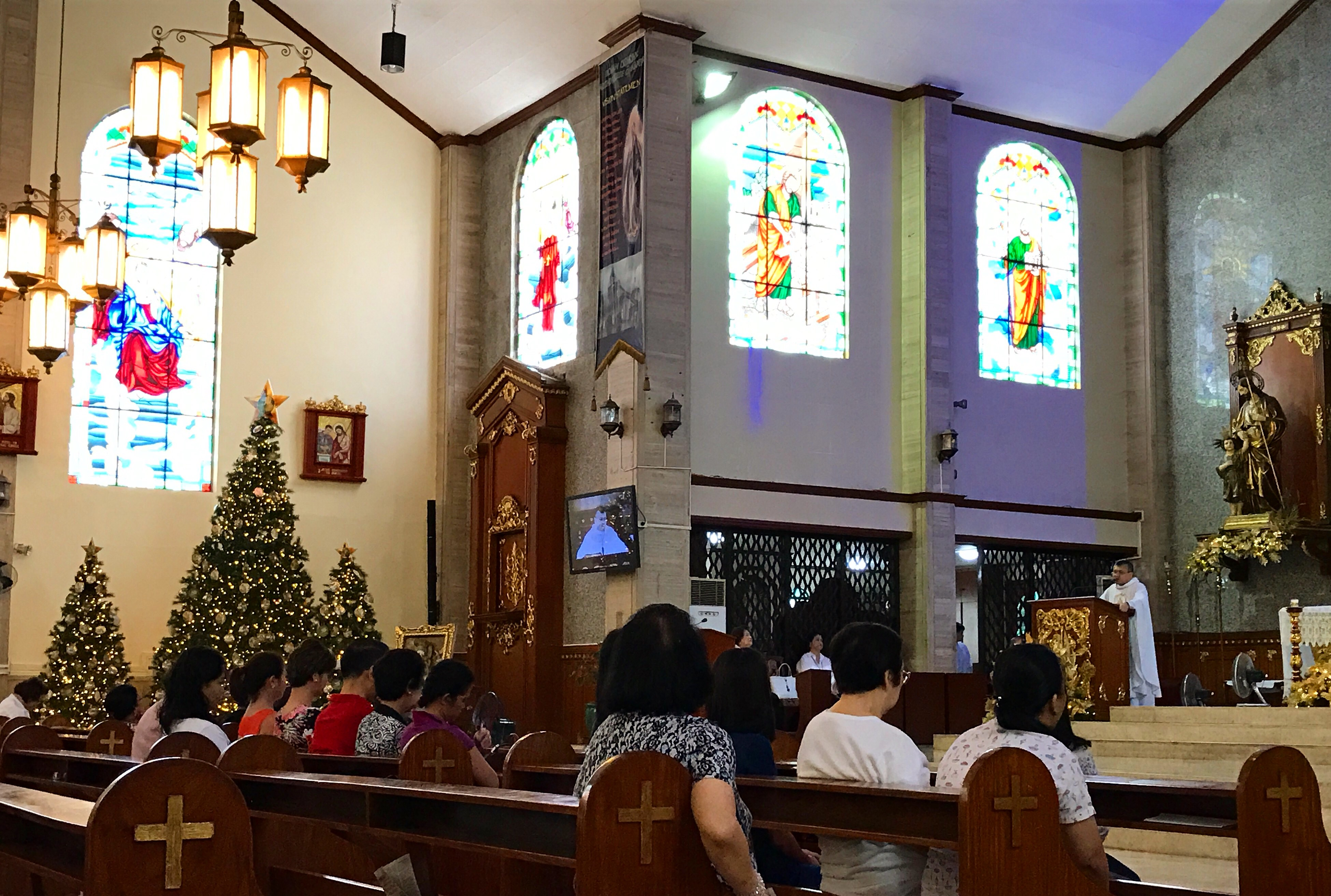
Mass of the Epiphany, 2017

=== Parish priests ===
Throughout the years, the Santuario de San Jose Parish and Community has been led, developed, and maintained by the pastoral guidance of parish priests appointed by the Archbishop of Manila per presentation of and recommendation from the OSJ Provincial Superior.

| Name | Years served |
|---|---|
| Rev. Fr. Guido Colletti, OSJ | 1967-1989 |
| Rev. Fr. Constantino Conti | 1989-1998 |
| Rev. Fr. Napoleon Jinon, OSJ | 1998-2004 |
| Rev. Fr. Venancio Silva, OSJ | 2004-2007 |
| Rev. Fr. Noel Magtaas, OSJ | 2007-2010 |
| Rev. Fr. Maximo Sevilla Jr., OSJ | 2010-2013 |
| Rev. Fr. Alexius Magtibay, OSJ | 2013–2019 |
| Rev. Fr. Adonis Mamuyac, OSJ | 2019–2020 |
| Rev. Fr. Gerbert Cabaylo, OSJ | 2020–2022 |
| Rev. Fr. Edwin Tolentino, OSJ | 2022–2025 |
| Rev. Fr. Allen Vic Cartagena, OSJ | 2025–present |

== Gallery ==
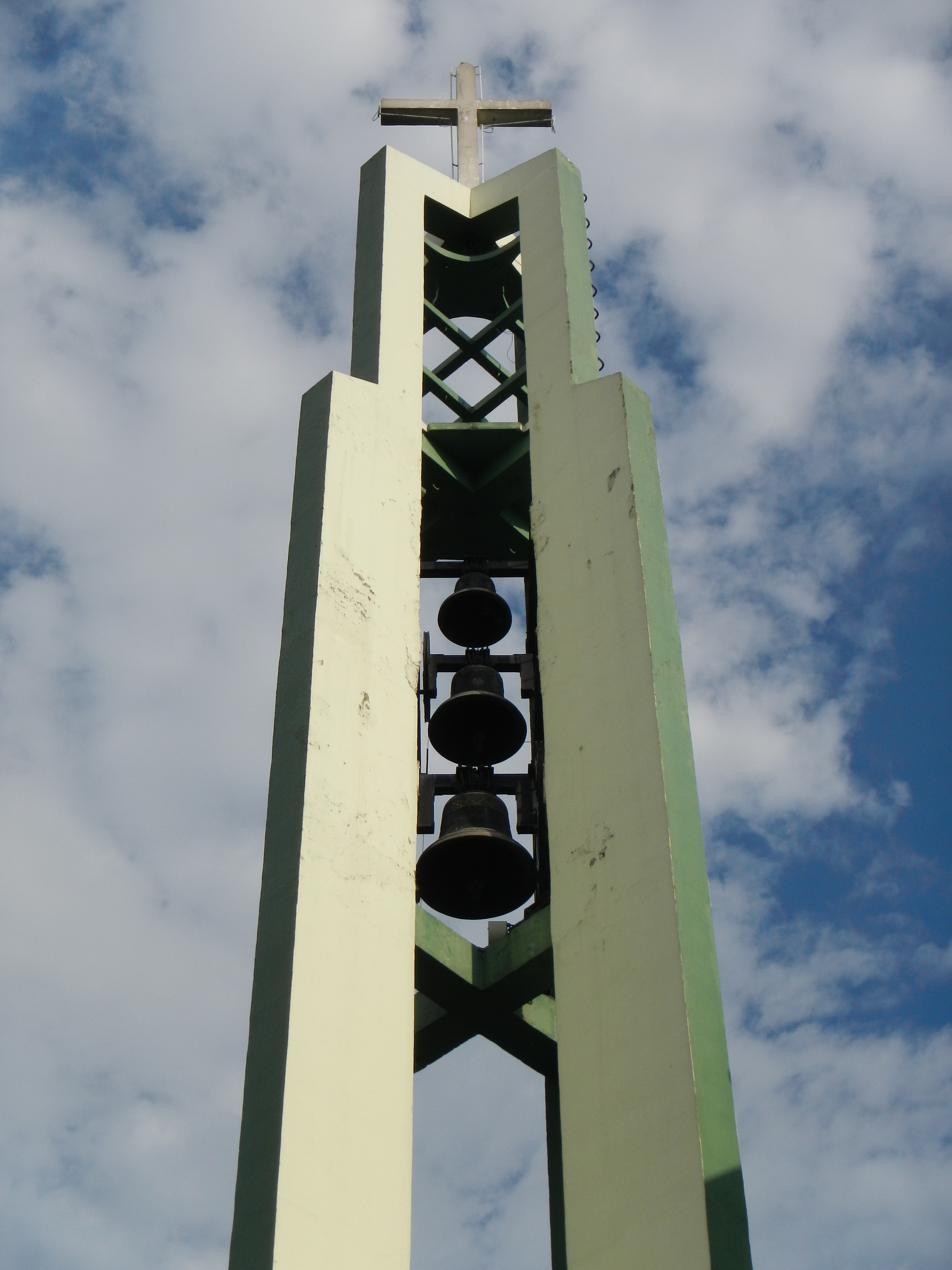
Bell tower

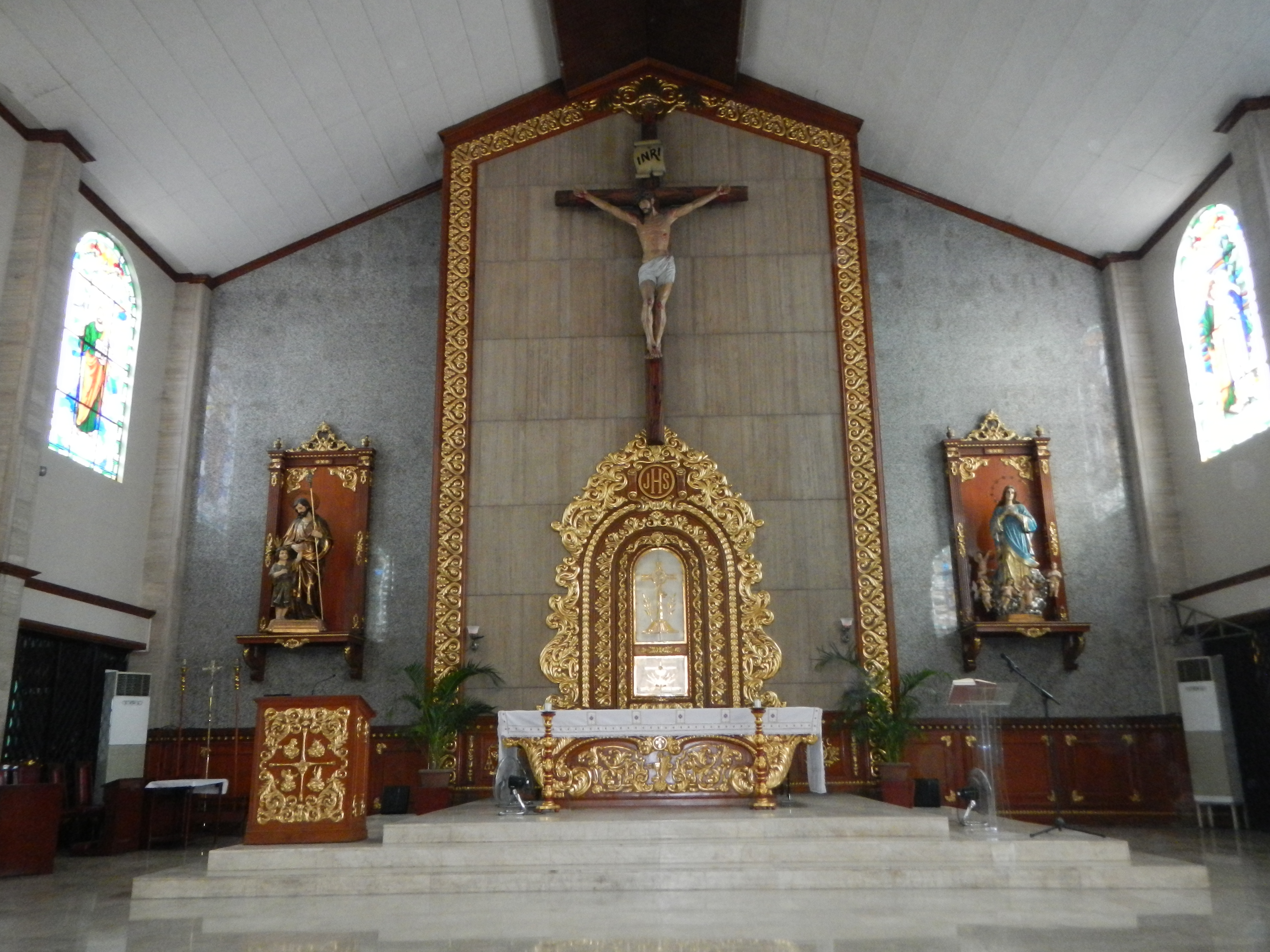
Church sanctuary

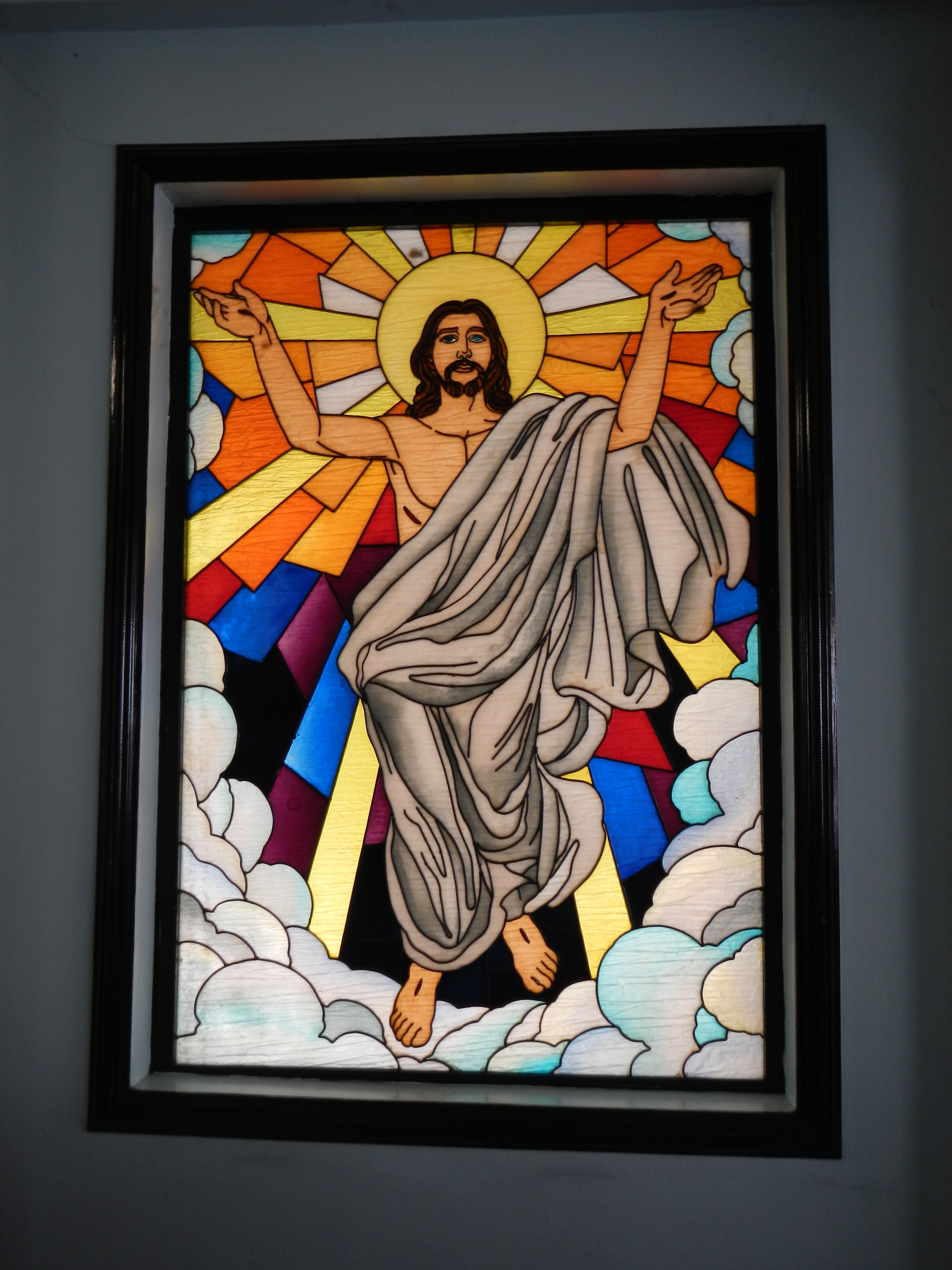
Stained glass depiction of Jesus

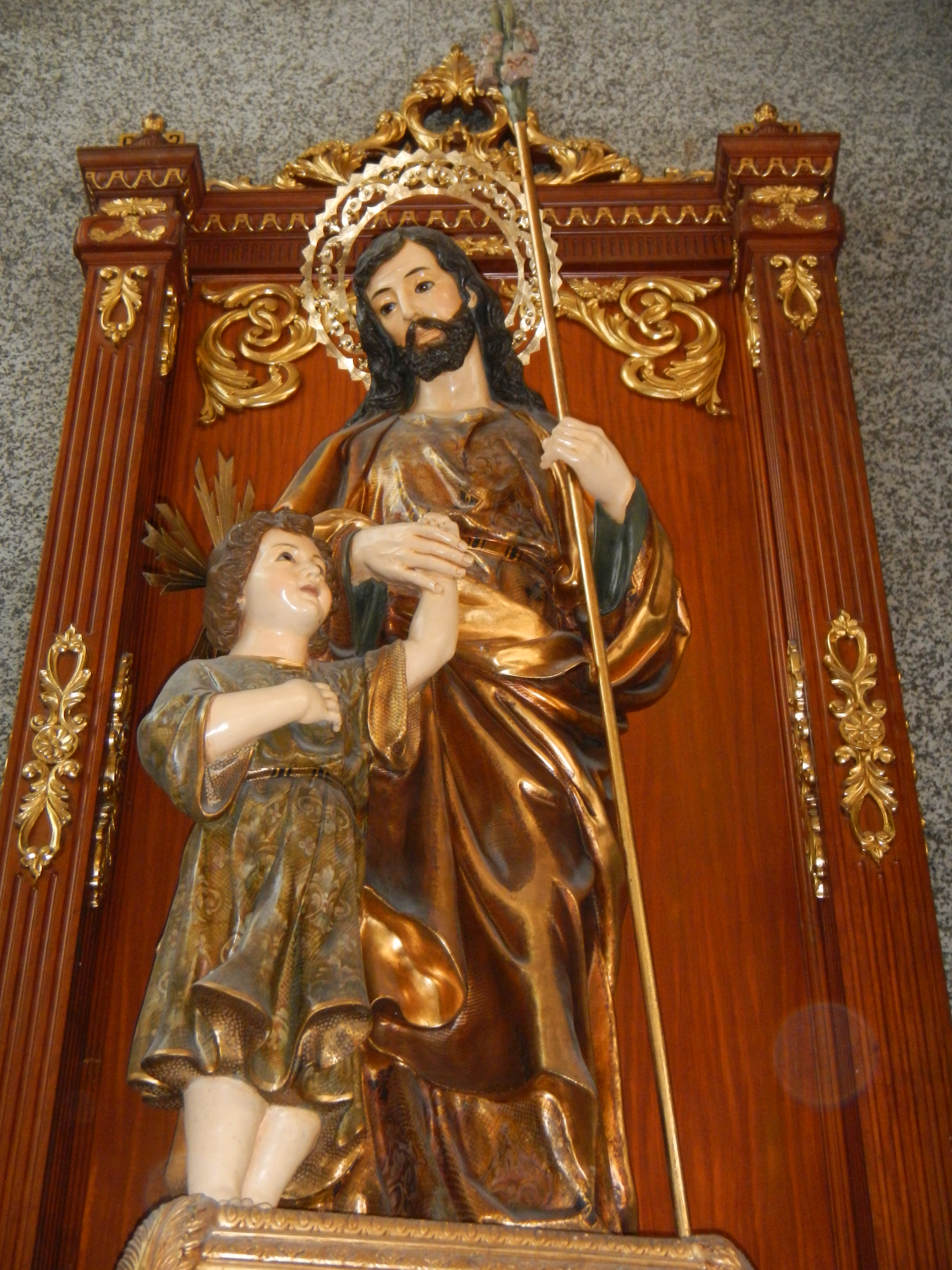
Saint Joseph and the Child Jesus

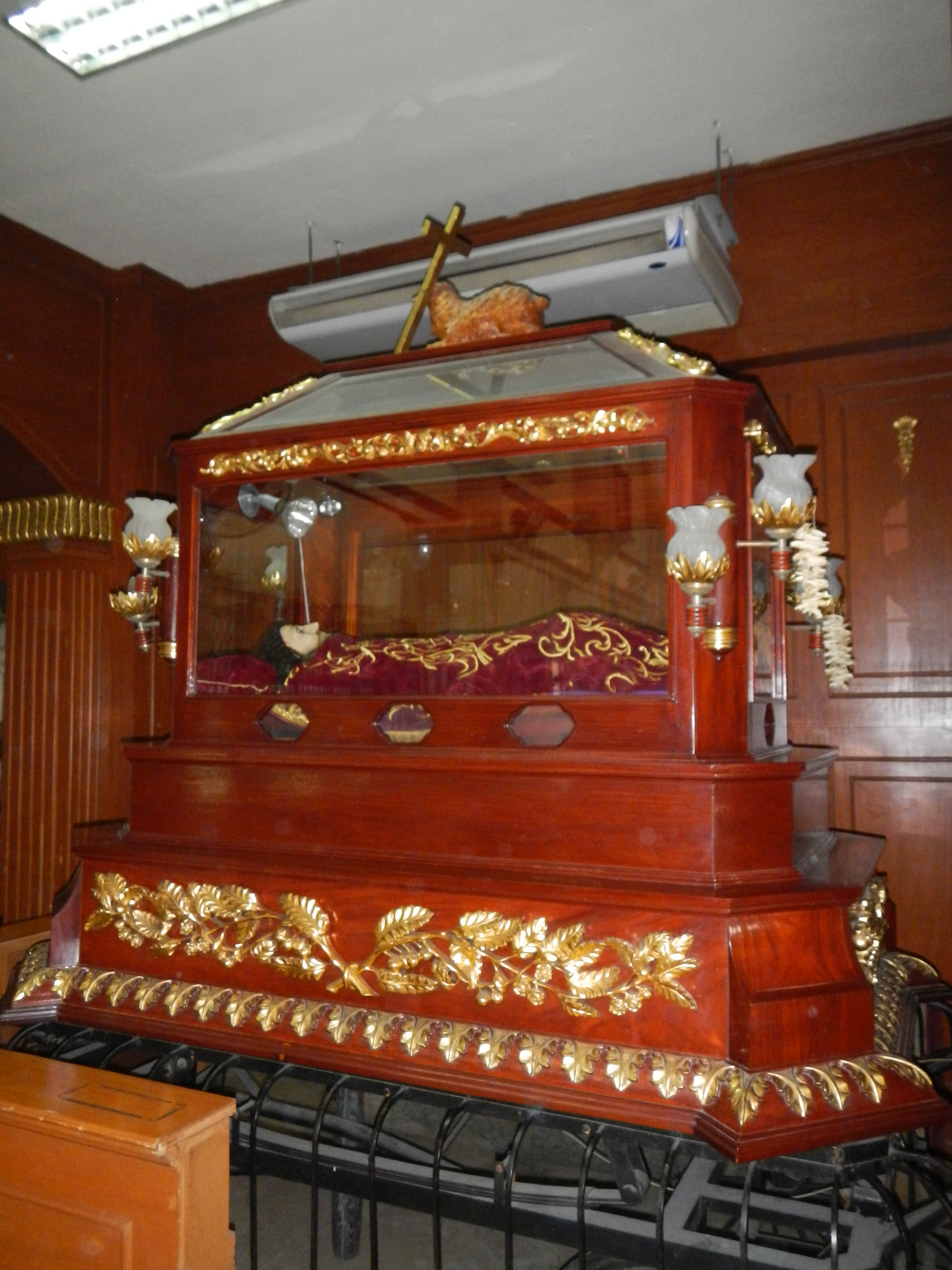
Santo Entierro

== See also ==
- Oblates of St. Joseph
- Joseph Marello
