= Chiara Badano =

Italian Blessed

Blessed Chiara Badano
- Chiara Badano, circa 1987

Virgin
- Born: October 29, 1971; Sassello, Italy
- Died: October 7, 1990 (aged 18); Sassello, Italy
- Venerated in: Roman Catholic Church
- Beatified: September 25, 2010, Sanctuary of Our Lady of Divine Love in Rome by Pope Benedict XVI
- Major shrine: Cimitero di Sassello Savona Liguria, Italy; Plot: Family chapel
- Feast: October 29

Chiara Badano (October 29, 1971 – October 7, 1990) was an Italian woman who has been beatified by the Roman Catholic Church. At age nine, she joined the Focolare Movement and received the nickname "Luce" ("light") by the founder Chiara Lubich. When she was 16, she was diagnosed with osteogenic sarcoma, a painful bone cancer. Chiara died from the cancer on October 7, 1990, after a two-year battle with the disease. She was beatified on September 25, 2010, at the Sanctuary of Our Lady of Divine Love in Rome. Her feast day is celebrated on October 29.

== Early life ==
Chiara Badano was born on October 29, 1971, to Ruggero Badano and Maria Teresa Caviglia in the small village of Sassello, Italy. The couple waited and prayed eleven years to have Chiara. While Ruggero worked as a truck driver, Maria Teresa stayed at home to raise their daughter. Chiara grew up with a strong and healthy relationship with her parents, but she did not always obey them and would occasionally have fights with them.

== Focolare Movement ==
Chiara attended her first meeting of the Focolare Movement in September 1980; she was only 9 years old. This group, especially its founder Chiara Lubich, had a profound impact on Chiara's life. The group focused on the image of the forsaken Christ as a way to make it through difficult times. Chiara later wrote that, "I discovered that Jesus forsaken is the key to unity with God, and I want to choose him as my only spouse. I want to be ready to welcome him when he comes. To prefer him above all else."

While Chiara was a conscientious student, she struggled in school and even failed her first year of high school. She was often teased in school for her strong beliefs and was given the nickname "Sister." She enjoyed the normal teenage pastimes such as listening to pop music, dancing, and singing. She was also an avid tennis player and enjoyed hiking and swimming.

During the summer of 1988, when she was 16 years old, Chiara had a life-changing experience in Rome with the Focolare Movement. She wrote to her parents, "This is a very important moment for me: it is an encounter with Jesus Forsaken. It hasn't been easy to embrace this suffering, but this morning Chiara Lubich explained to the children that they have to be the spouse of Jesus Forsaken." After this trip, she started to correspond regularly with Lubich. She then asked for her new name as this was going to be the start of a new life for her. Lubich gave her the name Chiara Luce. This was a kind of a play on words, since in Italian "Chiara" is a common girl's name, taken for example from the name of Clare of Assisi, but it is also an everyday word meaning "clear." "Luce" is occasionally found as a girl's name in Italy, though it is mostly secular rather than religious; and it is also an everyday word meaning "light." So "Chiara Luce" means "clear light." Lubich wrote to Chiara, "Your luminous face shows your love for Jesus," which is why she gave her the name Luce.

== Illness ==
In the summer of 1988, Chiara felt a sting of pain in her shoulder while playing tennis. At first she thought nothing of it, but when the pain continued to be present she underwent a series of tests. The doctors then discovered she had a rare and painful form of bone cancer, osteogenic sarcoma. In response, Chiara simply declared, "It's for you, Jesus; if you want it, I want it, too."

Throughout the treatment process, Chiara refused to take any morphine so she could stay aware. She felt it was important to know her illness and pain so she could offer up her sufferings. She said, "It reduces my lucidity and there's only one thing I can do now: to offer my suffering to Jesus because I want to share as much as possible in his sufferings on the cross." During her stays in the hospital, she would take the time to go on walks with another patient who was struggling with depression. These walks were beneficial to the other patient but caused Chiara great pain. Her parents often encouraged her to stay and rest but she would simply reply, "I'll be able to sleep later on."

One of her doctors, Antonio Delogu, said, "Through her smile, and through her eyes full of light, she showed us that death doesn't exist; only life exists." A friend from the Focolare Movement said, "At first we thought we'd visit her to keep her spirits up, but very soon we understood that, in fact, we were the ones who needed her. Her life was like a magnet drawing us to her."

Chiara kept her spirits up, even when the harsh chemotherapy caused her hair to fall out. When a lock of her hair would fall, Chiara would simply offer it to God, saying, "For you, Jesus." She also donated all her savings to a friend who was performing mission work in Africa. She wrote to him, "I don't need this money any more. I have everything."

To help prepare her parents for life after she died, Chiara made them dinner reservations for Valentine's Day after they refused to leave her bedside and ordered them to not return until after midnight. At Christmas she wrote, "Holy Christmas 1990. Thank you for everything. Happy New Year," on a Christmas card and hid it among some blank ones for her mother to find later.

Chiara's faith and spirit never dwindled even after the cancer left her unable to walk and a CAT scan showed that any hope of remission was gone. In response, she simply said, "If I had to choose between walking again and going to Heaven, I wouldn't hesitate. I would choose Heaven." On July 19, 1989, Chiara almost died of a hemorrhage. Her faith did not falter as she said, "Don't shed any tears for me. I'm going to Jesus. At my funeral, I don't want people crying, but singing with all their hearts."

Cardinal Saldarini, Archbishop of Turin, Italy, heard about Chiara's illness and visited her at the hospital. He asked her, "The light in your eyes is splendid. Where does it come from?" Chiara simply replied, "I try to love Jesus as much as I can."

When Chiara realized she was not going to get better, she started to make plans with her mother for her "wedding" (her funeral). She chose the music, hymns, flowers, and the readings for Mass. She wanted to be buried in her "wedding dress," a white dress with a pink waist, because her death would allow her to become the bride of Christ. She told her mother, "When you're getting me ready, Mum, you have to keep saying to yourself, 'Chiara Luce is now seeing Jesus.'" Before she died, she told her mother, "Oh, Mama, young people…young people…they are the future. You see, I can't run anymore, but how I would like to pass on to them the torch, like in the Olympics! Young people have only one life and it's worthwhile to spend it well."

== Death ==
During her final hours, Chiara made her final confession and received the Eucharist. She had her family and friends pray with her, "Come, Holy Spirit." She died at 4 am on October 7, 1990, with her parents at her bedside. Her final words were, "Bye, Mum, be happy, because I am." Two thousand people attended her funeral; the mayor of Sassello shut down the town so people would be able to attend.

Her remains are buried in the family chapel at Sassello Cemetery.

== Beatification ==
Chiara's cause for sainthood was promoted by Livio Maritano, the former Bishop of Acqui, Chiara's home diocese. The formal proceedings began on June 11, 1999, and concluded on October 1, 2000. On October 1, 2002, documents were transferred to the Roman Dicastery for the Causes of Saints, which has the responsibility of attesting by decree the heroicity of the virtues of a Servant of God. From March 25, 2004, to September 29, 2004, the diocesan super miro process took place. From it resulted:

[Healing of young Andrea Bartole from] Severe septic shock state meningococcal sepsis, ARDS syndrome complicated by right basal bronchopneumonia, DIC syndrome, acute renal failure, petechial and hemorrhagic skin manifestations with tendency to confluent generalized hematomas and generalized hypoxemic suffering, diffuse central nervous system suffering.

— Francesco Frigida

Andrea Bartole was a young man from Trieste, the capital city of Friuli-Venezia Giulia, Italy, who succumbed to terminal fulminant meningitis in 2001. His parents prayed for the intercession of Chiara to heal him from the meningitis that was destroying his organs. When his condition was subsequently suddenly healed, his doctors could not medically explain what had happened.

So, reasons given for canonization include a dedication to caring for children and the elderly and behavior described as "heroic" in the face of illness, as well as the canonical declaration of Andrea Bartole's return to health.

On July 3, 2008 Pope Benedict XVI authorized Cardinal José Saraiva Martins, the then Prefect of the Congregation for the Causes of Saints, to decree that the Servant of God Chiara Badano be given the title Venerable.

On January 15, 2009, a commission of doctors appointed by the Congregation for the Causes of Saints unanimously defined the healing as "inexplicable" by natural forces alone and also "rapid, total and lasting". Later, the theological commission called it "miraculous" and attributed it to the intercession of Chiara Luce. This opened the way to the further progress of the cause of her beatification.

On December 12, 2009, Pope Benedict XVI acknowledged the miracle and signed the decree of beatification.

Chiara Badano was declared a "Blessed" by the Catholic Church on September 25, 2010, at a solemn Mass celebrated at the Sanctuary of Our Lady of Divine Love in Rome, in the presence of thousands of people. Archbishop Angelo Amato, the then Prefect of the Roman Congregation for the Causes of Saints, said that Chiara was a great example of how the short life of a young person could be lived out in great holiness and "today there are virtuous people, who in family, at school, in society, do not fritter away their lives". Her feast day is celebrated on October 29.
