= Saint Majorinus =

Patron of Acqui Terme

- Detail of the portal of Acqui Cathedral depicting the saint

Bishop of Acqui
- Born: 4th century
- Died: 27 June 364 or 369; Acqui, Roman Empire
- Venerated in: Catholic Church
- Feast: 27 June
- Patronage: Acqui Terme

Saint Majorinus (Italian: San Maggiorino; 4th century – 27 June 364 or 369) was, according to tradition, the first bishop of the Diocese of Acqui. He is venerated as a saint by the Catholic Church.

== Biography ==
Majorinus was traditionally considered the first bishop of Acqui. His name is clearly associated with the Roman world, but little information about his life has survived due to the considerable passage of time.

His date of birth is unknown. However, according to a reconstruction carried out in the 17th century by Bishop Gregorio Pedroca, based on an ancient list of the bishops of the diocese dating from the 11th century, Majorinus's episcopate lasted 34 years and eight months. The reconstruction also identified 27 June as the date of his death and indicated that he was buried in Acqui, either in the Church of San Pietro or in the cemetery located in its immediate vicinity.

Tradition places Majorinus among the bishops appointed by Pope Sylvester I during his pontificate and sent to govern various churches in the society that emerged following the Edict of Milan. According to historical reconstructions, he may have been among the bishops who attended the synod held at Antioch in 324, although his presence among the three hundred Western bishops who participated in the Synod of Milan in 355 is considered more likely.

Among those devoted to Saint Majorinus was Guido of Acqui, one of his successors as bishop of Acqui, who eventually replaced him as the principal saint associated with the local area.

== Relic ==
A relic of Saint Majorinus is currently preserved in Acqui Cathedral, dedicated to the Assumption of Mary. For centuries, the relic was kept alongside those of other saints in the Abbey of Santa Giustina in Sezzadio. In 1811, Giovanni Francesco Toppia, the future bishop of Vigevano, placed the relic in a reliquary to protect it from possible damage by the Napoleonic army, before transferring it to Acqui Cathedral.

== Bibliography ==
- Ravera, Pompeo (1997). Tasca, Giovanni; Rapetti, Vittorio (eds.). I Vescovi della Chiesa di Acqui dalle origini al XX secolo (in Italian). Acqui Terme: Editrice Impressioni Grafiche.
- Commissione Liturgica Diocesana (1975). Il vescovo San Maggiorino nell'antica Chiesa di Acqui (in Italian). Alessandria: Tipografia Il Piccolo.

Religious titles
First	Bishop of Acqui; Unknown – 364 or 369	Succeeded by Maximus (according to tradition)
