= Livio Maritano =

Italian Catholic bishop

- Bishop of Acqui
- Church: Catholic Church
- Diocese: Diocese of Acqui
- In office: 30 June 1979 – 9 December 2000
- Predecessor: Giuseppe Moizo
- Successor: Pier Giorgio Micchiardi
- Previous posts: Titular Bishop of Opitergium (1968-1979); Auxiliary Bishop of Turin (1968-1979)

Orders
- Ordination: 27 June 1948
- Consecration: 15 December 1968 by Michele Pellegrino

Personal details
- Born: 28 August 1925 Giaveno, Province of Turin, Kingdom of Italy
- Died: 6 May 2014 (aged 88)

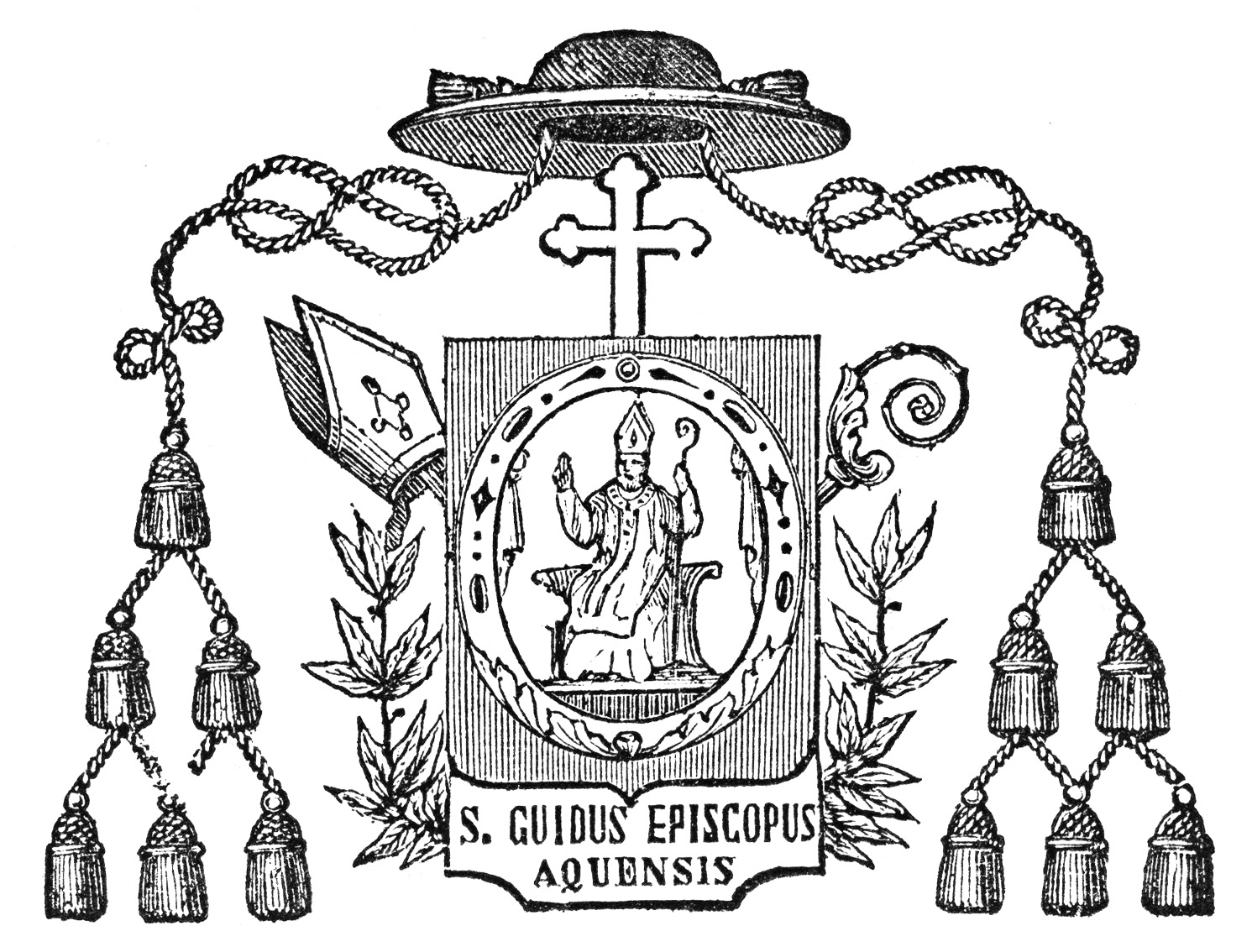
Coat of arms of the Diocese of Acqui.

Livio Maritano (28 August 1925 – 6 May 2014) was an Italian Catholic bishop.

Ordained to the priesthood in 1948, Maritano was named auxiliary bishop of the Archdiocese of Torino, Italy and titular bishop of Opitergium on 19 October 1968. In 1979, he was named bishop of the Roman Catholic Diocese of Acqui and retired in 2000.

Bishop Maritano was the promoter of the cause of beatification of Blessed Chiara Badano, beatified in Rome, in the Santuario della Madonna del Divino Amore, 25 September 2010. He knew Blessed Chiara personally.
