= Bonaventura Fauni-Pio =

Most Reverend Bonaventura Fauni-Pio
- Bishop of Acqui
- Church: Catholic Church
- Diocese: Diocese of Acqui
- In office: 1549–1558
- Predecessor: Pierre Van Der Worst
- Successor: Pietro Fauno Costacciaro

Orders
- Consecration: 9 Apr 1549

Personal details
- Born: 1496 Costacciaro, Italy
- Died: 1562 (age 66) Gubbio, Italy

Bonaventura Fauni-Pio (1496–1562) was a Roman Catholic prelate who served as Bishop of Acqui (1549–1558).

== Biography ==
Bonaventura Fauni-Pio was born in Costacciaro, Italy in 1496 and ordained a priest in the Order of Friars Minor Conventual. In 1543, he was appointed Minister General of Order of Friars Minor Conventual. On 9 Apr 1549, he was appointed during the papacy of Pope Paul III as Bishop of Acqui. On 28 May 1549, he was consecrated bishop. He served as Bishop of Acqui until his resignation in 1558. He died in Gubbio, Italy in 1562.

While bishop, he was the principal co-consecrator of Antonio Bernardo de Mirandola, Bishop of Caserta (1552).

Catholic Church titles
Preceded by Pierre Van Der Worst	Bishop of Acqui; 1549–1558	Succeeded by Pietro Fauno Costacciaro
