= Pierre Van Der Worst =

Roman Catholic bishop

Most Reverend Pierre Van Der Vorst
- Bishop of Acqui
- Church: Catholic Church
- Diocese: Diocese of Acqui
- In office: 1535–1549
- Successor: Bonaventura Fauni-Pio

Orders
- Consecration: 1535 by Antonio Pucci

Personal details
- Died: 1549 Acqui, Italy

Pierre Van Der Vorst (died 1549) was a Roman Catholic prelate who served as Bishop of Acqui (1535–1549). He was the son of Jean Van der Vorst, Seigneur of Loenbeke and Chancellor of Brabant for Charles V and Philip II, King of Castile. He served as a judge in the courts of the Roman Curia, and as ambassador of Pope Paul III to the German princes in negotiations for holding the Council of Trent.

== Biography ==
Pierre van der Vorst's brother Jean was Dean of the Cathedral Chapter of Utrecht, Canon of Saint-Lambert at Liège, and Provost of the Cathedral Chapter of Cambrai. Another brother, Gauthier van der Vorst, became a Protonotary Apostolic and Canon of Cambrai (died 1535). A third brother, Jacques, was a doctor and Councilor of the Royal Council of Brabant. A fourth, Engelbert, lived at the castle of Loenbeke. Pierre also had two sisters, Isabel and Barbe.

Pierre studied at Louvain, and also obtained the degree of Doctor in utroque iure (Doctor of Civil and Canon Law). He followed his professor, Adrien Florenz Boyens, to Spain, where he had been named Bishop of Tortosa. When his patron was elected Pope Adrian VI, Pierre accompanied him to Rome, where he was named a papal Chaplain. After the death of Jean de Beecke, Provost of Cambrai, the benefice was given to Pierre van der Vorst, probably by Pope Adrian. On 18 June 1529, Pierre resigned the office in favor of his brother Jean. Pierre also held a canonry in the Cathedral Chapter of Antwerp, and canonries at Aix-la-chapelle and at Liège. These canonries were sources of income, not offices which involved the "cure of souls". He was also Abbot Commendatory of Vaucelle (diocese of Cambrai).

=== Auditor of the Rota ===
On the death of Adrian VI, he became attached to Cardinal Willem van Enckevoirt. He was named Auditor of the Rota for the German nation (judge in the Roman Curia) by Pope Clement VII in 1525.

In 1534, when Enckevoirt wrote his Last Will and Testament, Pierre van der Vorst was named executor of his property in Rome and in Italy. The Cardinal died on 19 July 1534. Cardinal Eberhard (Erard) de la Marck, Bishop of Liège, with whom Pierre van der Vorst worked in 1537, granted him, on 28 July 1534, the archdeaconry of Famenne (one of the seven archdeaconries of Liège), a post once held by Willem van Enckevoirt.

=== Bishop ===
On 20 Feb 1535, Pierre van der Vorst was appointed by Pope Paul III as Bishop of Acqui. On 14 March 1535 he was consecrated a bishop by Antonio Pucci, Cardinal-Priest of Santi Quattro Coronati. He succeeded Cardinal Enckevoirt, after his resignation in 1534, as Archdeacon of Brabant in the Church of Cambrai. Van der Vorst was immediately put to work at the Papal Curia. On 17 August 1535, Pope Paul III issued a bull, Sublimis Deus, in which he appointed a commission of five cardinals (Piccolomini, Sanseverino, Ghinucci, Simonetti, and Cesi) and three bishops, one of whom was Van der Vorst, to carry out a reform of the city of Rome and the Roman Curia, with unlimited powers to uproot and punish all spiritual and secular transgressions, abuses, and errors.

On Easter Day 1536, at St. Peter's Basilica in Rome, the Emperor Charles V issued a charter, confirming Bishop Petrus Vorstius (Pierre van der Vorst) as Prince and Imperial Councilor and Locumtenens Palatii Apostolici Causarum, in all the privileges previously granted to the bishops of Acqui.

=== German legation ===
On 10 September 1536 Pierre van der Vorst was sent as Nuntius to Germany to announce to the various princes the opening of the ecumenical council, which was supposed to hold its first session at Mantua on 23 May 1537. At the time of his appointment to his German mission, though he was then Bishop of Acqui, he was still serving in the Roman Curia with the title of comes locumtenens Rotae (associate member of the Rota). He was accompanied by Cornelius Ettenius, who served as secretary of the mission and kept a journal of Van der Vorst's activities. His brother Jacques served as chancellor of the mission. The more difficult part of van der Vorst's assignment was to convince the various German princes, whether Catholic or Protestant, to support or at least cooperate with the summoning of the Council and its work. The Emperor Charles, in fact, was in constant negotiation with the Pope as to whether a council would take place, where it would be held, and who would be admitted as participants and experts (periti); he preferred a council to be held on German territory (which Mantua barely was), and with due consideration given to his Protestant princes and subjects, especially those who belonged to the Schmalkaldic League. Though Charles was firmly Catholic, he ruled over a fractious political community, and his position was a delicate one.

Van der Vorst arrived in Vienna on 6 November 1536, and was favorably received by Ferdinand, King of the Romans, of Bohemia, of Hungary, and of Croatia, the younger brother of the Emperor Charles V. On 19 November Ferdinand dubbed his brother Jacques a knight. On 24 February 1537 he appeared at a meeting of the Schmalkaldic League, and attempted to persuade the Protestant leaders, including Philip Melanchthon, to recognize the Council. The Protestants wanted to debate every point of difference they had with Rome, and the talks were unsuccessful. On 9 March Van der Vorst visited Halle, the residence of Cardinal Albert of Brandenburg, Archbishop of Mainz, with whom he engaged in discussions and where he also met Duke Henry of Brunswick-Wolfenbüttel. On 15 March he met with Duke George of Saxony and Count Albert of Mansfeld-Hinterort (1480-1560), both protectors of Martin Luther. Conversations with them, and others, continued throughout March, until, after the Feast of the Annunciation, van der Vorst took the road to Leipzig. He then traveled to Cologne, where he arrived on 19 April 1537. Though he carried letters of introduction in addition to his mandate from the Pope, he was coldly received by the Dean of the Chapter of the Cathedral, and turned over to the consuls of the city instead for hospitality. It was to the consuls that he announced his papal mission, offering assistance to them in their various activities in support of the Church and Papacy. Privately the chief consul complained to the Nuncio about the hostile attitude of the clergy toward the Holy See. On April 22 Hermann von Wied, the Archbishop of Cologne, arrived in person, a rather tall old man in a full white beard, who escorted the Nuncio to his palace in Bonn. In a lengthy conversation the Archbishop informed the Nuncio that he was personally in favor of the Pope's plans, but that he was overawed by his colleagues, and would not dare to consent publicly to them without first consulting those colleagues. On 25 April, van der Vort held consultations with the Archbishop of Trier, Johann von Metzenhausen, who stated that he would by no means consent to the Pope's plans unless the other electors agreed, in which case he would follow the majority.

From Cologne the Nuntius travelled to Mainz and then to Worms, where he arrived on 30 April 1537. The council never opened at Mantua, and a war between Charles V and Francis I postponed the idea indefinitely. Both French prelates and Protestant leaders refused to risk attendance. The council was moved by the Pope to Vicenza, but there too attendance was very small, and on 21 May 1539 Pope Paul finally gave up and postponed the council indefinitely.

=== The diocese ===
After his return from Germany, van der Vorst continued to work in the Roman Curia. Paul III specifically addresses him, tibi qui locum unius ex causarum palatii Apostolici auditoribus de mandato nostro tenes, ac Prelatus domesticus noster.

In the summer of 1543 Bishop van der Vorst decided to pay an official pastoral visit to his diocese of Acqui. He obtained a decree from Pope Paul III, dated 9 July 1543, granting him the privilege of filling all of the vacant benefices in his diocese during his visit, with a limit of the two months of August and September.

=== Trent ===
Bishop Van der Vorst was present at the 9th and 10th sessions of the Council of Trent, which were held in Bologna, and he signed the decrees on 21 April and 1 June 1547. On 30 October 1548, Pope Paul III wrote a letter to the Emperor Charles V, commending Bishop van der Vorst, who was setting out for Flanders, for the sake of his health and to put his affairs there in order.

He served as Bishop of Acqui until his death in 1549. His successor Bonaventura Costacciari was appointed in the Consistory of 9 April 1549.

== Sources ==
- De Ram, P(ierre) F(rançois) X(avier). "Nonciature de Pierre Van der Vorst d'Anvers, évêque d'Acqui, en Allemagne et dans les Pays-Bas," in: Nouveaux Mémoires de l'académie royale de Belgique XII [1839], [last memoire in collection]. (in French)
- X.Y.Z. (pseudonym), "Le Saint Sacrement de miracle de Bruxelles," in: Collection de précis historiques. seconde serie (in French). Vol. II. Bruxelles: Alfred Vromant. 1873. pp. 346–355.

Catholic Church titles
Preceded by	Bishop of Acqui; 1535–1549	Succeeded by Bonaventura Fauni-Pio
