= Giovanni Ambrogio Bicuti =

Roman Catholic prelate (1607–1675)

Most Reverend Giovanni Ambrogio Bicuti
- Bishop of Acqui
- Church: Catholic Church
- Diocese: Diocese of Acqui
- In office: 1647–1675
- Predecessor: Felix Crocca
- Successor: Carlo Antonio Gozzano

Orders
- Consecration: 2 Jun 1647 by Pier Luigi Carafa

Personal details
- Born: 7 Dec 1607 Acqui, Italy
- Died: 10 Mar 1675 (age 67) Acqui, Italy

Giovanni Ambrogio Bicuti (1607–1675) was a Roman Catholic prelate who served as Bishop of Acqui (1647–1675).

== Biography ==
Giovanni Ambrogio Bicuti was born in Acqui, Italy on 7 Dec 1607. On 27 May 1647, he was appointed during the papacy of Pope Innocent X as Bishop of Acqui. On 2 Jun 1647, he was consecrated bishop by Pier Luigi Carafa, Cardinal-Priest of Santi Silvestro e Martino ai Monti, with Ranuccio Scotti Douglas, Bishop of Borgo San Donnino, and Alessandro Vittrici, Bishop of Alatri, serving as co-consecrators. He served as Bishop of Acqui until his death on 10 Mar 1675.

Catholic Church titles
Preceded by Felix Crocca	Bishop of Acqui; 1647–1675	Succeeded by Carlo Antonio Gozzano
