= Enrico Feroci =

Italian Roman Catholic cardinal

His Eminence Enrico Feroci
- Cardinal; Pastor of Santa Maria del Divino Amore a Castel di Leva
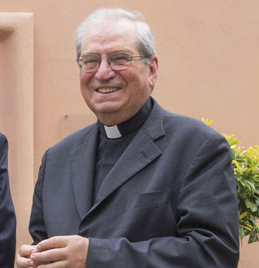
- Feroci in Rome on 1 September 2017.
- Church: Roman Catholic Church
- Appointed: 1 September 2019
- Other post: Cardinal Deacon of Santa Maria del Divino Amore a Castel di Leva (2020–present)
- Previous posts: Official of the Diocese of Rome (2009–17); Director of Caritas Rome (2009–18); Titular Archbishop of Cures Sabinorum (2020)

Orders
- Ordination: 13 March 1965
- Consecration: 15 November 2020 by Angelo De Donatis
- Created cardinal: 28 November 2020 by Francis
- Rank: Cardinal-Deacon

Personal details
- Born: Enrico Feroci; 27 August 1940 (age 86) Pizzoli, Kingdom of Italy
- Education: Pontifical Roman Major Seminary
- Motto: Domino necessarius est ('The Lord has need of it', Mark 11:3)
- Coat of arms

Styles of Enrico Feroci
- Reference style: His Eminence
- Spoken style: Your Eminence
- Religious style: Cardinal
- Informal style: Cardinal

Enrico Feroci (born 27 August 1940) is an Italian prelate of the Catholic Church, currently serving as the parish priest of Shrine of Our Lady of Divine Love in Rome, Italy. He has spent his career in the Diocese of Rome, fulfilling pastoral assignments and contributing to the administration of the diocese. From 2009 to 2017 he led the diocesan arm of Caritas, which oversees social service and relief programs.

Pope Francis raised him to the rank of cardinal on 28 November 2020. In anticipation of that consistory, he received episcopal consecration on 15 November.

== Biography ==
Enrico Feroci was born on 27 August 1940 in Pizzoli. At the age of eleven he entered the Pontifical Roman Minor Seminary and after high school continued at the Roman Major Seminary. He was ordained a priest on 13 March 1965. He worked as an assistant at the Pontifical Roman Minor Seminary for a year and then at the Major Seminary from 1966 to 1968 when he returned to the minor seminary as vice-rector.

He was assistant pastor of San Frumenzio ai Prati Fiscali from 1976 to 1980 and there from 1980 to 2004. For many terms he was Prefect of the IX Prefecture, a member of the Council of Prefects, of the Presbyteral Council, of the Council for Economic Affairs, of the College of Consultors of the Diocese of Rome. His activities included work on the Synod of the Church of Rome from 1987 to 1992 and on the City Mission that preceded the Jubilee of 2000.

On 1 July 2004 he became parish priest of Sant’Ippolito in Piazzale delle Province. On 1 September 2009 the Cardinal Vicar Agostino Vallini appointed him Director of the Diocesan Caritas, and in that post he was also president of the "Caritas Roma" Foundation and of the “Salus Popoli Romani” anti-usury foundation. He also chaired the effort known as Cooperativa Roma Solidarietà (Cooperative Rome Solidarity), which oversees the services promoted by Caritas de Roma. Since 17 December 2011 he has been a consultor to the Pontifical Council for the Pastoral Care of Migrants and Itinerant People.

On 10 November 2017 the Cardinal Vicar Angelo De Donatis appointed him President of the Public Clerical Association of Oblates Sons of Our Lady of Divine Love, Rector of the Shrine of Our Lady of Divine Love, and, as of 1 September 2018, Rector of the Seminary of Our Lady of Divine Love. He appointed him canon and camerlengo of the Archbasilica of Saint John Lateran.

On 1 September 2019 he was appointed parish priest of the Parish of the Shrine of Our Lady of Divine Love in Castel di Leva.

On 25 October 2020, Pope Francis announced that he would make Feroci a cardinal during a consistory on 28 November 2020. In anticipation of that consistory, in accordance with the requirement that only all cardinals be bishops, he received his episcopal consecration in his parish church from Cardinal Angelo De Donatis on 15 November, becoming the titular archbishop of Passo Corese, in Latium. The co-consecrators were Archbishop Claudio Maria Celli and Vincenzo Apicella, Bishop of Velletri-Segni. At that consistory, Pope Francis made him Cardinal Deacon of Santa Maria del Divino Amore a Castel di Leva, his parish church, which the Pope made a titular church at the same time.

Feroci was the first priest of the Diocese of Rome received by Pope Francis after his election to the papacy 13 March 2013.

== See also ==
- Cardinals created by Pope Francis

Catholic Church titles
Preceded by Juan de Dios Hernández Ruiz	Titular Archbishop of Passo Corese; 31 October 2020 – 28 November 2020	Succeeded by Michele Autuoro
New title	Cardinal-Deacon of Santa Maria del Divino Amore a Castel di Leva; 28 November 2020 – present	Incumbent
