= Camillo Beccio =

Roman Catholic prelate (died 1620)

Most Reverend Camillo Becci
- Bishop of Acqui
- Church: Catholic Church
- Diocese: Diocese of Acqui
- In office: 1598–1620
- Predecessor: Gian Francesco Biandrate di San Giorgio Aldobrandini
- Successor: Gregorius Pedrocca

Personal details
- Died: 1620 Acqui, Italy

Camillo Becci (died 1620) was a Roman Catholic prelate who served as Bishop of Acqui (1598–1620).

== Biography ==
Camillo Becci was ordained a priest in the Order of Saint Augustine. On 25 November 1598, he was appointed during the papacy of Pope Clement VIII as Bishop of Acqui. On 10 January 1599, he was consecrated bishop by Gian Francesco Biandrate di San Giorgio Aldobrandini, Cardinal-Priest of San Clemente, with Giovanni Fontana, Bishop of Ferrara, and Carlo Trotti, Bishop of Bagnoregio, serving as co-consecrators. He served as Bishop of Acqui until his death in 1620. He died in 1562. While bishop, he was the principal co-consecrator of Fabrizio Verallo, Bishop of San Severo (1606), and Vincenzo Meligne, Bishop of Ostuni.

Catholic Church titles
Preceded by Gian Francesco Biandrate di San Giorgio Aldobrandini	Bishop of Acqui; 1598–1620	Succeeded by Gregorius Pedrocca
