= Gian Francesco Biandrate di San Giorgio Aldobrandini =

Italian Roman Catholic cardinal

His Eminence Gian Francesco Biandrate di San Giorgio Aldobrandini
- Cardinal-Priest of San Clemente; Bishop of Faenza
- Church: Catholic Church

Orders
- Consecration: 3 Nov 1585 by Giovanni Antonio Serbelloni

Personal details
- Born: 7 Apr 1545 Casale di Monferrato, Italy
- Died: 16 Jul 1605 (age 60) Lucca, Italy

Gian Francesco Biandrate di San Giorgio Aldobrandini (1545–1605) was a Roman Catholic cardinal.

== Biography ==
On 3 Nov 1585, he was consecrated bishop by Giovanni Antonio Serbelloni, Cardinal-Bishop of Frascati, with Gaspare Cenci, Bishop of Melfi e Rapolla, and Filippo Sega, Bishop of Piacenza, serving as co-consecrators.

== Episcopal succession ==
While bishop, he was the principal consecrator of Giovanni Anselmo Carminati, Bishop of Alba (1596) and Camillo Beccio, Bishop of Acqui (1599); and the principal co-consecrator of Ottavio Bandini, Archbishop of Fermo (1595).

== External links and additional sources ==
- Cheney, David M. "Diocese of Faenza-Modigliana". Catholic-Hierarchy.org. (for Chronology of Bishops) ^{[self-published]}
- Chow, Gabriel. "Diocese of Faenza-Modigliana (Italy)". GCatholic.org. (for Chronology of Bishops) ^{[self-published]}

Catholic Church titles
Preceded by Pietro Fauno Costacciaro	Bishop of Acqui; 1585–1598	Succeeded by Camillo Beccio
Preceded by Flaminio Piatti	Cardinal-Priest of San Clemente; 1596–1605	Succeeded by Carlo Conti
Preceded by Gian Antonio Grassi	Bishop of Faenza; 1603–1605	Succeeded by Erminio Valenti
