= Diocese of Acqui =

Roman Catholic diocese in Italy

Coordinates: 44.6833°N 8.4667°E

Diocese of Acqui Dioecesis Aquensis

Catholic
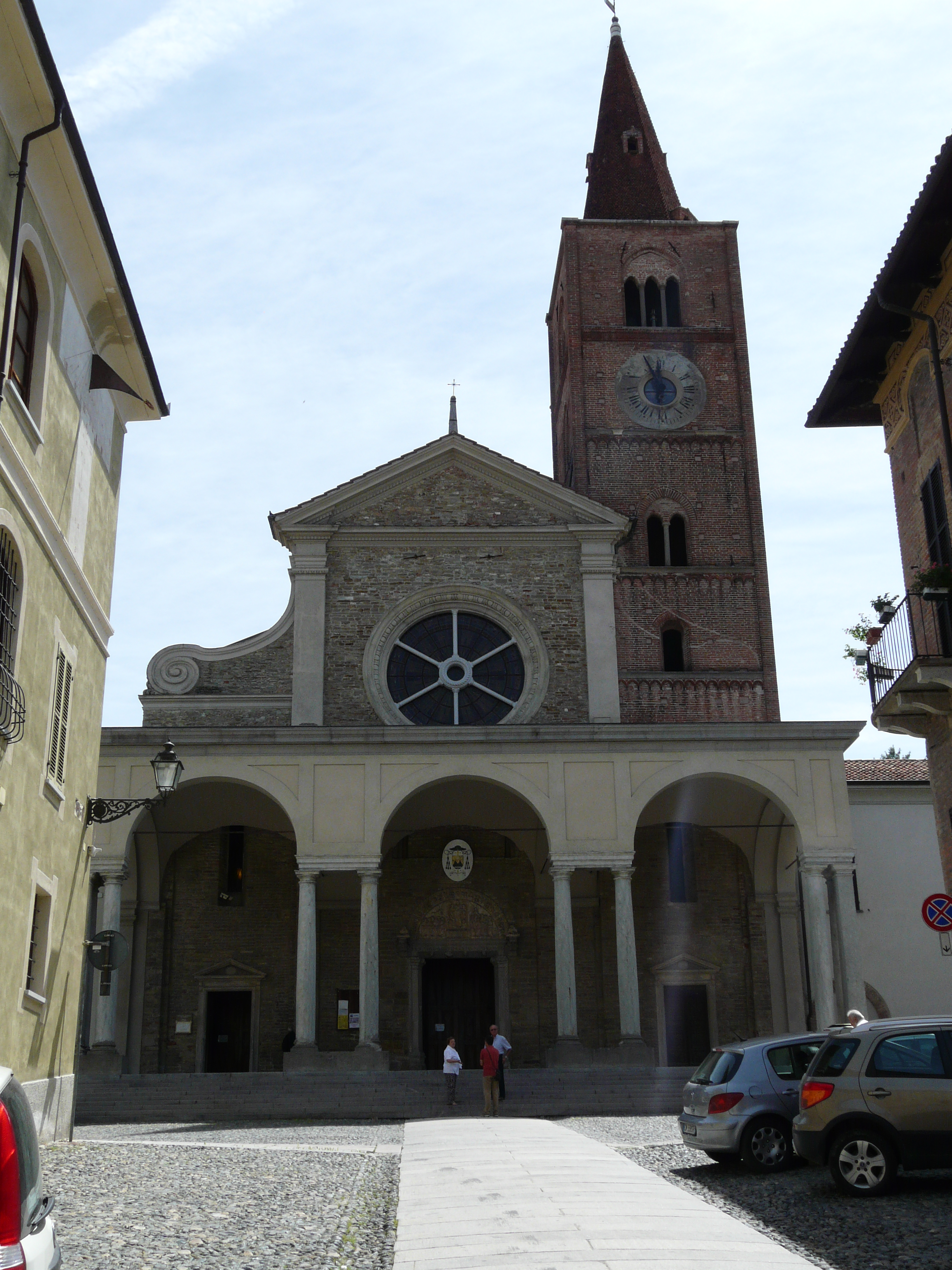
- Acqui Terme Cathedral

Location
- Country: Italy
- Ecclesiastical province: Turin

Statistics
- Area: 1,683 km^{2} (650 sq mi)
- Population: Total; Catholics: (as of 2015); 156,100 (est.); 148,500 (est.) (95.1%)
- Parishes: 115

Information
- Denomination: Catholic Church
- Rite: Roman Rite
- Established: 4th century
- Cathedral: Cattedrale di Nostra Signora Assunta
- Secular priests: 95 (diocesan); 8 (Religious Orders); 16 Permanent Deacons

Current leadership
- Pope: Leo XIV
- Bishop: Luigi Testore
- Bishops emeritus: Pier Giorgio Micchiardi

Map

The Diocese of Acqui (Latin: Dioecesis Aquensis) is a Latin diocese of the Catholic Church that straddles the (civil) regions of Piedmont and Liguria, in northwest Italy. The ancient Roman name of the place was Aquae Statiellae, which was sometimes confused with Aquae Sentiae (Aix-en-Provence), and Aquae Augustae (Dax), where there were also bishops. Acqui had always been subordinate to the Province of Milan, down until 1817, when Pope Pius VII assigned it to the Province of Turin. As a suffragan of the Archdiocese of Turin, it falls within the ecclesiastical region of Piedmont.

== History ==
It is probable that the diocese of Acqui was established at the end of the fourth century, about the same time, it would appear, as the dioceses of Novara, Turin, Ivrea, Aosta and perhaps, Asti and Alba.

The first undoubted bishop of Acqui was Ditarius. A tablet found in 1753 in the church of St. Peter, indicates that Ditarius, bishop of Acqui, died on 25 January 488, in the Consulate of Dinamias and Syphidius.

Popular tradition gives Deusdedit, Andreas, Severus, Maximus, and, earliest of all, Majorinus, as bishops prior to him. Majorinus probably lived either at the end of the fourth, or in the beginning of the fifth, century. The name was very common in the third, fourth, and fifth centuries. Veneration was offered to the saint from time immemorial by the church in Acqui, shown by his statues and relics. This veneration, however, has ceased since a decree of the Congregation of Rites (8 April 1628) prohibited the veneration of saints whose sanctity had not been declared by the Holy See.

In the list of the bishops of Acqui appears Saint Guido (1034–70), who was said to be a member of the family of the Counts of Acquesana, under whose patronage the cathedral was erected. He is the patron saint of Acqui.

=== Acqui and Alessandria ===
In 1068 the new city of Alessandria, named in honor of Pope Alexander III, was created, with the object of countering the political maneuvers of the Emperor Frederick Barbarossa. In 1070 a delegation was sent to Rome, which presented the city to the Pope as a vassal of the Holy Roman Church. In 1075, Pope Alexander erected a new diocese at Alessandria, and provided its first bishop, Arduinus. The territory of the new diocese was taken from that of the diocese of Acqui. In 1180, Archbishop Algisius of Milan, acting on authority delegated to him by Pope Alexander, decreed the union of the two dioceses in the person of Bishop Uberto Tornielli of Acqui, who would take the title of Bishop of Alessandria, but the arrangement was acceptable neither to the people of Acqui nor to Bishop-elect Otto of Alessandria, and therefore the union did not take effect.

The new diocese of Alessandria, however, supported the Emperor Otto IV against the Papacy, and therefore in 1202 Pope Innocent III suppressed the diocese of Alessandria and reunited its territory to the jurisdiction of the diocese of Acqui. The bishop was ordered to live six months at Acqui and six months at Alessandria.

Friction developed between Bishop Uberto, who was in favor of the union, and the Chapter of the Cathedral of Acqui, who envisioned the loss of their status and prerogatives if the bishop should move to Alessandria. Bishop Uberto therefore appealed to the Pope on 16 February 1205. On 16 May, Pope Innocent III sent representatives to Piedmont to bring about the union, deciding that the bishop would be called the Bishop of Alessandria and Acqui. Their work was ratified by the Pope. Bishop Uberto began to use the double title. Bishop Uberto, however, was caught in some simonical transactions with regard to churches in both dioceses which were not under episcopal control, and he was suspended by Innocent III from his functions on 12 October 1211. His repentance was apparently unsatisfactory, since Pope Innocent accepted his resignation from his episcopal functions on 12 November 1213.

Acqui and Alessandria were united until 1405, until the diocese of Alessandria was re-erected. Pope Innocent VII (Roman Obedience) appointed Fra Bertolino of Alessandria as the new bishop on 14 April 1405.

=== Synods ===
A diocesan synod was an irregularly held, but important, meeting of the bishop of a diocese and his clergy. Its purpose was (1) to proclaim generally the various decrees already issued by the bishop; (2) to discuss and ratify measures on which the bishop chose to consult with his clergy; (3) to publish statutes and decrees of the diocesan synod, of the provincial synod, and of the Holy See.

A set of canons ('capitula') was issued jointly by Archbishop Ottone Visconti (1262–1295) of Milan and Bishop Alberto (1258–c. 1270) of Acqui in 1265, perhaps in connection with a provincial or diocesan synod, or both. Bishop Oddonus (1305–c. 1340) held a diocesan synod which concluded on 10 April 1308, and issued, with the consent of the Cathedral Chapter, a set of canons which were concerned mostly with clerical conduct and the proper administration of the sacraments, as well as limitations on the participation of lay persons in the election or installation of clergy.

Bishop Bonifacio de Sismondi (1427–1450) conducted three diocesan synods during his term: the first opened on 10 February 1429; the second in 1432, which dealt with financing the attendance of the bishop at the Council of Basel; and the third in 1440. He also began the construction of the episcopal palace, for which money had been left by his predecessor, Bishop Enrico.

Pope Sixtus IV was committed to the idea of yet another crusade against the Turks. He launched his project in the spring of 1475 by demanding a 10% tax on the income of the clergy. On 13 April 1475 he wrote to Bishop Thomas de Regibus of Acqui, naming him papal Nuncio and Collector of Papal Revenues in the entire Marquisate of Monferrat, and granting him the powers necessary to make the collection from all church institutions (including Chapters, monasteries, Priories, and convents) and persons (from Patriarchs and Archbishops down to simple clerics), administrators, and officials, both exempt from normal episcopal jurisdiction and not exempt; lay persons were to contribute 3 1/3%, and Jews 5%.

In 1477 Bishop de Regibus held a diocesan synod in the Cathedral of Acqui, from the 3rd to the 19th of October.

In 1480 Bishop Thomas de Regibus was compelled to appeal to the pope when three of the castles in his diocese which formed part of the episcopal income were seized by Antoniotto Malaspina, a layman of the diocese of Acqui. Pope Sixtus IV in response ordered the Archpriest of the neighboring diocese of Asti to investigate the matter.

A diocesan synod was held by Bishop Ludovico Bruni (1499–1508), and a set of thirty-nine canons of entirely traditional content was published from the Cathedral of Acqui on 22 August 1499.

Bishop Giuseppe Maria Sciandra (1871–1888) held a diocesan synod on 5–7 September 1876.

=== Cathedral and Chapter ===
The original cathedral of the diocese of Acqui was at the church of S. Pietro. The new cathedral, dedicated to the Virgin Mary, was begun by Bishop Primus (c. 989–1018) in the Lombard style, and became the cathedral of the diocese under Bishop Dudo (c. 1024–1033), who transferred the Canons from S. Pietro, and converted S. Pietro into a monastic foundation. A donation charter of 1042 mentions both the monastery of S. Pietro and the Chapter house of S. Maria. Work on the cathedral was completed in 1167, and Bishop Guido (1034–1070) consecrated the entire edifice. His hagiographical life, with perhaps some exaggeration, says that he built the Cathedral of S. Maria with his own funds, and had Bishop Petrus of Tortona and Albertus (Obertus) of Genoa consecrate the edifice on 11 (or 13) November 1167.

The Cathedral of Acqui was served by a Chapter, composed of three dignities and (in 1675) nine Canons. In 1744 there were twelve Canons. By 1844 there were fifteen Canons. The dignities were: the Provost, the Archdeacon, and the Archpriest.

In the 15th century there were evidently problems with the Chapter in maintaining a regular system of public worship in the Cathedral. An agreement was entered into in 1455 by the Canons with Bishop Thomas de Regibus, but the provisions had not been carried out. A new agreement to prevent this dereliction of duty was sworn to with Bishop Constantinus Marenchi on 11 October 1486, binding both those canons who were present and those who happened to be absent from the meeting.

In 1495 Bishop Marenchi dedicated the new cathedral cloister and houses for the Canons and other clergy who served the Cathedral.

== Bishops of Acqui ==
=== to 1300 ===
...
? Majorinus (Majorianus)
[Deusdedit]

- Ditarius (c. 488)

...

- Valentinus (c. 680)

...

- Odelbertus (c. 844)
- Raganus (c. 864)
- Bado (Bodone) (c. 875–after 891)
- ? Thedaldus (Sedaldus)

[Dodo (Dodone)]

- Restaldus (c. 936)
- Adalgisus (c. 945, c. 952)
- Gotofredus (c. 968)
- Benedictus (c. 978)
- Arnaldus (c. 978–989)
- Primus (c. 989–1018)
- Brunengus (c. 1022)
- Dudo (Dudone) (c. 1024–1033)
- Guido (1034–1070)
- Alberto (c. 1073–1079)

...

- Azzo (Azone) (c. 1098–c. 1122)
- Uberto (c. 1136–c. 1148)
- Enrico (c. 1149)
- Guglielmo (c. 1164)
- Galdino (c. 1167–c. 1176)
- Uberto (1177–1181)
- Ugo (1183–1213)
- Anselmo (1215–after 1226)
- Otto (Ottone) (by 1231–1238)
- Giacomo (1239)
- Guglielmo (1239–1251)
- Alberto de Incisa (1251)
- Enrico (1252–1258)
- Alberto Sivoleto(1258–c. 1270)
- Baudicius (c. 1271–c. 1277)

Sede Vacante

- Olgerio (1283–1304) Bishop-Elect

=== 1300–1600 ===
- Oddonus (1305–c. 1340)
- Ottobono (c. 1340–1342)
- Guido de Ancisa (1342–1373)
- Jacobus (Jacobinus) (1373)
- Franciscus (1373–1380)
- Conradus Malaspina, O.Min. (1380–c.1382?) (Avignon Obedience)
- Enrico Scarampi (1383–1403) (Roman Obedience)
  - Beroaldus (c. 1382) (Roman Obedience)
  - Valentinus (c. 1388) (Roman Obedience)
- Bonifacio de Corgnato, O.Min. (1403–1408) (Roman Obedience)
- Percival de Sismondi (1408–1423) (Roman Obedience)
- Matteo Giselberti (1423–1427)
- Bonifacio de Sismondi (1427–1450)
- Thomas de Regibus (1450–1483)
- Constantinus Marenchi (1484–1498)
- Ludovico (Enrico) Bruni (1499–1508)
- Dominicus Schelinus de Filonariis (1508–1533?)

[Cardinal Giovanni Vincenzo Carafa (1533?–1534)]

- Pierre van der Vorst (1534–1549 Died)
- Bonaventura Fauni-Pio, O.F.M. Conv. (1549–1558 Resigned)
- Pietro Fauno Costacciaro (1558–1585 Resigned)
- Gian Francesco Biandrate di San Giorgio Aldobrandini (1585–1598 Resigned)

=== 1600–1800 ===
- Camillo Beccio, O.S.A. (1598–1620)
- Gregorius Pedrocca, O.F.M. (1620–1632)
- Felix Crocca, O.F.M. Conv. (1632–1645 Died)
- Giovanni Ambrogio Bicuti (1647–1675)
- Carlo Antonio Gozzani (1675–1721)
- Giovanni Battista Rovero (Rotario da Pralormo) (1727–1744)
- Alessio Ignazio Marucchi (1744–1754 Died)
- Carlo Giuseppe Capra (1755–1772 Died)
- Giuseppe Maria Corte (1773–1783)
- Carlo Luigi Buronzo del Signore (1784–1791)
- Giacinto della Torre, O.E.S.A. (1797–1805)

=== since 1800 ===
- Maurice-Jean-Madeleine de Broglie (1805–1807)
- Luigi Antonio Arrighi de Casanova (1807–1809)

Sede vacante (1809–1817)

- Carlo Giuseppe Maria Sappa de Milanes (1817–1834)
- Modesto (Luigi Eugenio) Contratto, O.F.M. Cap. (1836–1867)

Sede Vacante (1867–1871)

- Giuseppe Maria Sciandra (1871–1888)
- Giuseppe Marello, O.S.I. (1889–1895)
- Pietro Balestra, O.F.M. Conv. (1895–1900)
- Disma Marchese (1901–1925 Died)
- Lorenzo Del Ponte (1926–1942 Died)
- Giuseppe Dell'Omo (1943–1976 Retired)
- Giuseppe Moizo (1976–1979 Died)
- Livio Maritano (1979–2000 Retired)
- Pier Giorgio Micchiardi (2000–2018 Retired)
- Luigi Testore (2018–present)

== Parishes ==
The diocese, which covers an area of 1,683 km², is divided into 115 parishes. The majority are in the Piedmont region (provinces of Alessandria and Asti), the rest are in Liguria (provinces of Genoa and Savona). A list of parishes by province and commune follows

== Bibliography ==
=== Reference works ===
- Gams, Pius Bonifatius (1873). Series episcoporum Ecclesiae catholicae: quotquot innotuerunt a beato Petro apostolo. Ratisbon: Typis et Sumptibus Georgii Josephi Manz. pp. 808–809. (in Latin)
- Eubel, Conradus, ed. (1913). Hierarchia catholica. Vol. Tomus 1 (second ed.). Münster: Libreria Regensbergiana. (in Latin)
- Eubel, Conradus, ed. (1914). Hierarchia catholica. Vol. Tomus 2 (second ed.). Münster: Libreria Regensbergiana. (in Latin)
- Gulik, Guilelmus (1923). Eubel, Conradus (ed.). Hierarchia catholica. Vol. Tomus 3 (second ed.). Münster: Libreria Regensbergiana. (in Latin)
- Gauchat, Patritius (Patrice) (1935). Hierarchia catholica. Vol. Tomus IV (1592-1667). Münster: Libraria Regensbergiana. (in Latin)
- Ritzler, Remigius; Sefrin, Pirminus (1952). Hierarchia catholica medii et recentis aevi V (1667-1730). Patavii: Messagero di S. Antonio.
- Ritzler, Remigius; Sefrin, Pirminus (1958). Hierarchia catholica medii et recentis aevi. Vol. Tomus VI (1730-1799). Patavii: Messagero di S. Antonio. (in Latin)
- Ritzler, Remigius; Sefrin, Pirminus (1968). Hierarchia Catholica medii et recentioris aevi sive summorum pontificum, S. R. E. cardinalium, ecclesiarum antistitum series... A pontificatu Pii PP. VII (1800) usque ad pontificatum Gregorii PP. XVI (1846) (in Latin). Vol. VII. Monasterii: Libr. Regensburgiana.
- Remigius Ritzler; Pirminus Sefrin (1978). Hierarchia catholica Medii et recentioris aevi... A Pontificatu PII PP. IX (1846) usque ad Pontificatum Leonis PP. XIII (1903) (in Latin). Vol. VIII. Il Messaggero di S. Antonio.
- Pięta, Zenon (2002). Hierarchia catholica medii et recentioris aevi... A pontificatu Pii PP. X (1903) usque ad pontificatum Benedictii PP. XV (1922) (in Latin). Vol. IX. Padua: Messagero di San Antonio. ISBN 978-88-250-1000-8.

=== Studies ===
- Bima, Palemone Luigi (1842). Serie cronologica dei romani pontefici e degli arcivescovi e vescovi di tutti gli stati di Terraferma & S. S. B. M. e di alcune del regno di Sardegna (in Italian) (seconda ed.). Torino: Favale. pp. 81–88.
- Cappelletti, Giuseppe (1858). Le chiese d'Italia: dalla loro origine sino ai nostri giorni (in Italian). Vol. decimoquarto (14). Venice: G. Antonelli. pp. 133–158.
- Dolermo, Marco Francesco (2005). La costruzione dell'odio: ebrei, contadini e diocesi di Acqui dall'istituzione del ghetto del 1731 alle violenze del 1799 e dal 1848 (in Italian). Torino: S. Zamorani. ISBN 978-88-7158-130-9.
- Iozzi, Oliviero (1880). Il Piemonte sacro (in Italian). Acqui: Salvator Dina.
- Kehr, Paul Fridolin (1914). Italia pontificia : sive, Repertorium privilegiorum et litterarum a romanis pontificibus ante annum 1598 Italiae ecclesiis, monasteriis, civitatibus singulisque personis concessorum. Vol. VI. pars ii. Berolini: Weidmann. pp. 190–191.
- Lanzoni, Francesco (1927). Le diocesi d'Italia dalle origini al principio del secolo VII (an. 604). Faenza: F. Lega, pp. 827–828. (in Italian)
- Manno, Antonio (1891). Bibliografia storica degli stati della monarchia di Savoia (in Italian). Vol. Tomo II. Torino: Fratelli Bocca. pp. 12–44.
- Moriondo, Giovanni Battista (1789). Monumenta Aquensia (in Latin). Vol. Pars I. Torino: Typographia regia. Pars II. 1790.
- Porter, Arthur Kingsley (1916). Lombard Architecture. Vol. II. Yale University Press. pp. 14–24.
- Ratti, Innocenzo (1844). Le regie terme di Acqui (in Italian) (nuova ed.). Milano: V. Guglielmini.
- Ravera, Pompeo (1997). I vescovi della chiesa di Acqui dalle origini al XX secolo. Acqui: Editrice Impressioni Grafiche 1997.
- Ravera, Pompeo, et al. Archivio vescovile di Acqui (1998). I Vescovi acquesi pastori nel mondo dall’XI al XX secolo. Acqui Terme: Impressioni Grafiche, 1998. (in Italian)
- Savio, Fedele (1898). Gli antichi vescovi d'Italia dalle origini al 1300 descritti per regioni: Il Piemonte (in Italian). Torino: Fratelli Bocca. pp. 9–48.
- Ughelli, Ferdinando; Coleti, Niccolo (1719). Italia sacra, sive de episcopis Italiae et insularum adjacentium (in Latin). Vol. Tomus quartus (4) (2nd ed.). Venice: Apud Sebastianum Coleti. pp. 326–331.
