= Luigi Beltrame Quattrocchi and Maria Corsini =

Holy couple

Blesseds Luigi Beltrame Quattrocchi and Maria Corsini
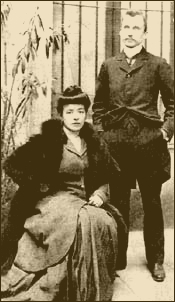
- The Quattrocchis, c. 1905
- Born: Luigi (12 January 1880, in Catania); Maria (24 June 1884, in Florence)
- Died: Luigi (9 November 1951, aged 71 in Rome); Maria (26 August 1965, aged 81 in Serravalle di Bibbiena)
- Venerated in: Catholic Church
- Beatified: 21 October 2001, Saint Peter's Basilica, Vatican City by Pope John Paul II
- Feast: 25 November

Luigi Beltrame Quattrocchi (12 January 1880 – 9 November 1951) and Maria Corsini (24 June 1884 – 26 August 1965) were two married Italian Catholic laypeople who became the first couple to be beatified together, in 2001. According to Pope John Paul II, they lived "an ordinary life in an extraordinary way". Their feast is on 25 November, the anniversary of their wedding day.

== Luigi Beltrame Quattrocchi ==
Luigi was born in Catania in 1880 to Carlo and Francesca Beltrame Vita. The second surname was added when Luigi was raised and then adopted by his childless aunt and uncle, Stefania and Luigi Quattrocchi, but maintained a close relationship with his birth parents. He attended school at Ancona and then moved to Rome, where he lived in the area of Esquiline. He studied jurisprudence at Sapienza University of Rome and graduated in 1902 with a degree in law.

After his graduation, Quattrocchi took a legal position with the Intendacy of Finances and later went on to hold a number of posts on the boards of a variety of banks, including the Bank of Italy.

== Maria Corsini ==
Maria Luisa Corsini was born in Florence in 1884, a member of the noble Corsini family. Her father, Angeiolo Corsini, was a Royal Army captain of grenadiers. Her mother was Julia Salvi. Because of her father's frequent military transfers, the family lived in Pistoia, Arezzo and Rome.

Corsini had an excellent education from a young age. Parish priests taught her literature classes, which gave her the background to write essays and books on education, religion, the family and the spiritual upbringing of children. She followed a strict religious life, which included religious counseling, attending mass, receiving daily Holy Communion, and reciting prayers. Although she had been enrolled at a parish school in Rome run by nuns, when one of the nuns talked ill of the King, Corsini transferred to a state-run school. After her graduation, she became a professor of education and lecturer.

== Married life ==
Corsini met Quattrocchi, the son of a family friend, at her family's home in Florence. The two married on 25 November 1905 in the Cappella Corsini in the Basilica di Santa Maria Maggiore, in Rome. In the early years after their marriage, they lived together with parents and grandparents.

She was a highly devout person, but her husband, in the initial years, was not. In the first three years of marriage, Corsini gave birth to three children: Filippo (born 1906), Stephania (born 1908) and Cesare (born 1909). Diagnosed with placenta praevia during her fourth pregnancy, and given the dangers at that time of carrying the baby to term, doctors counseled the couple to abort the pregnancy. Her husband was advised that, barring a medical intervention, he should expect to be a widower with three small children to attend to. The doctors induced labour, however, and delivered the baby prematurely. Corsini attributed her faith in God to her and her baby's survival. Enrichetta (born 1914) and two of her siblings were present for their parents' beatification (in 2001).

Maria worked for the Red Cross during the Second Italo-Ethiopian War and served as a voluntary nurse in the Italian Red Cross during World War II. The couple's home was open for those in need during wartime. Corsini was active with women's causes in the St. Vitale Parish and the women's division of Catholic Action.

== Children ==
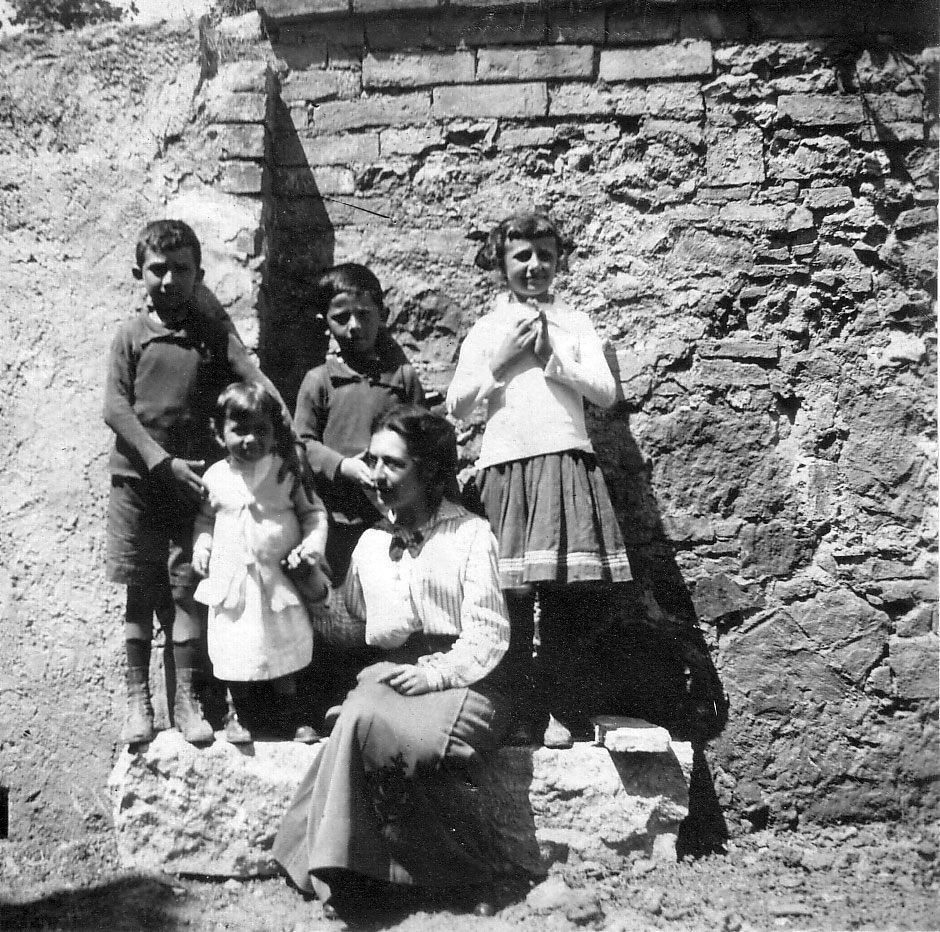
Maria and her children

The couple had four children:

- Filippo (October 15, 1906–February 20, 2003), Benedictine priest
- Stefania (March 9, 1908–March 1, 1993), Benedictine
- Cesare (November 27, 1909–December 31, 2008), Trappist
- Enrichetta or Enrica (April 6, 1914–June 16, 2012), whose cause of beatification opened in 2021

== Organizations ==
The couple were among the founders of many Catholic organizations:

- ASCI (Associazione Scouts Cattolici Italiani), the Italian Catholic scout association;
- Azione Cattolica, the biggest lay organization of Catholics in Italy;
- UNITALSI, an organization which carries infirm people on pilgrimages to Lourdes and other sanctuaries.

Both were members of the Third Order Regular of St. Francis of Penance. They started scouting groups for children in the poorer neighborhoods of Rome. Although initially supportive, they soon became disenchanted with fascism. During the Second World War, their home on Via Depretis became a shelter for Jews and other refugees.

Corsini and her husband were associated with many religious institutions. Cardinal Jose Saraiva Martin noted that "they made their family an authentic domestic church, open to life, prayer, witness of the Gospel, the social apostolate, solidarity with the poor, and friendship ... Intimately united in love and Christian ideals, they walked together on the path of holiness." The couple also established a Scouting group in Rome.

== Death and burial ==
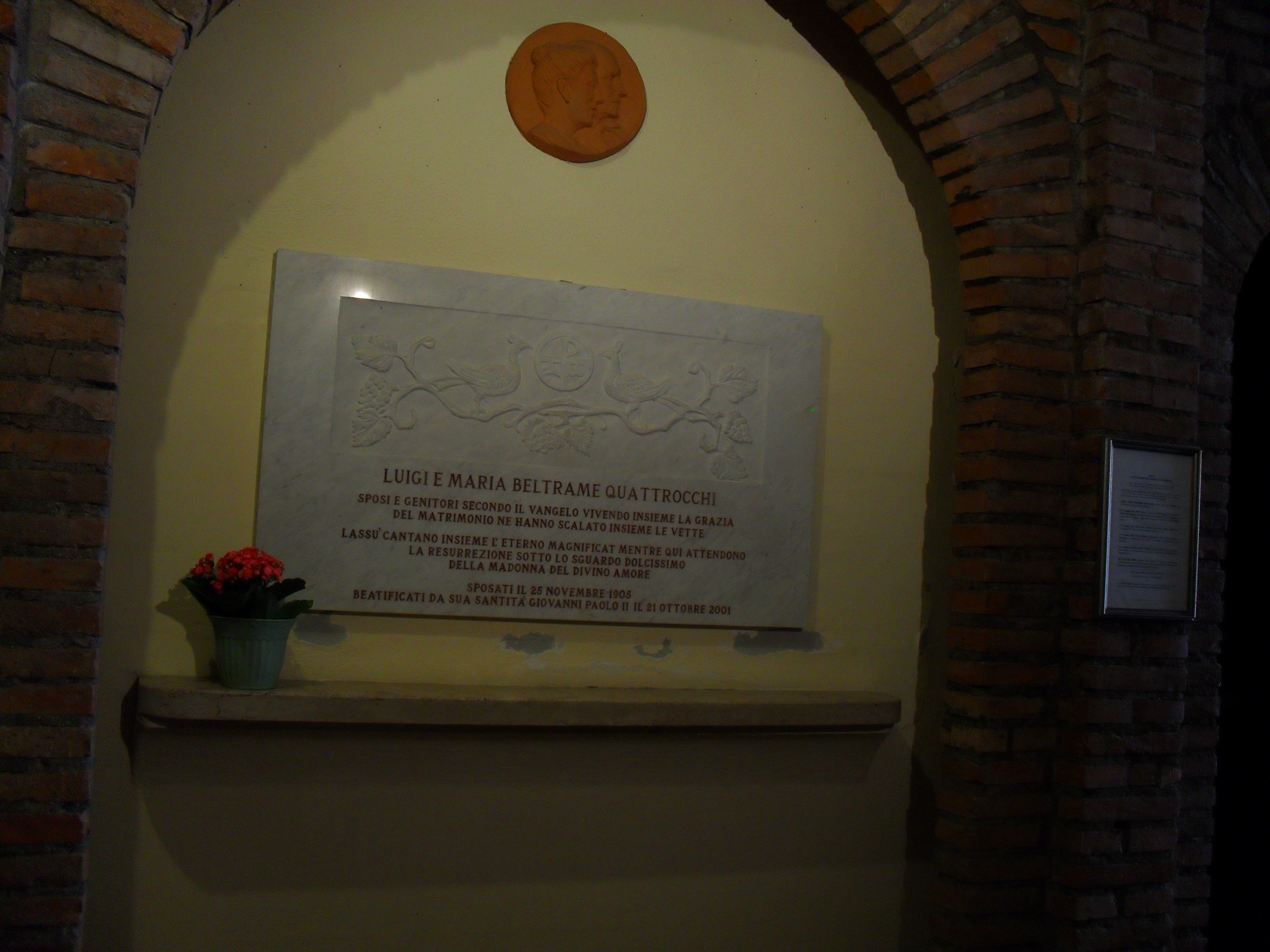
Tomb of the Quattrocchis

Luigi died 9 November 1951 in Rome. Maria died on 26 August 1965 at her La Madonnina home in Serravalle di Bibbiena, which had been built by her husband. Both are buried in the crypt of the Santuario della Madonna del Divino Amore in Rome.

== Legacy ==
The Foundation Luigi and Maria Beltrame Quattrochi has the objective of helping couples to marry and to advise them on cementing their marital life.

== Beatification ==
The beatification process commenced on 18 October 1994 which would allow for the two to hold the title of Servant of God. A local process was held from 25 November 1994 to 4 December 1996 in order to collect documentation and testimonies. The process was validated on 20 June 1997 with the positio submitted to the Congregation for the Causes of Saints in 1999. Cardinal José Saraiva Martins, Prefect of the Congregation for the Causes of Saints, said that Beltrame Quattrocchi and Corsini "made a true domestic church of their family, which was open to life, to prayer, to the social apostolate, to solidarity with the poor and to friendship".

Pope John Paul II approved their lives of heroic virtue and proclaimed them to be venerable on 7 July 2001. In that same decree, he also recognized a miracle that had been attributed to their intercession. He beatified the couple on 21 October 2001. in the presence of three of their four children. Their sons concelebrated the Mass with the Pope. The day of the beatification was special, as it marked the 20th anniversary since the publication of Familiaris consortio an Apostolic Exhortation.

A second miracle was investigated from 11 March 2014 to 17 December 2014. The relics of Beltrame Quattrocchi and Corsini are in the crypt of the Santuario della Madonna del Divino Amore in Rome.

"Among the joys and anxieties of a normal family, they knew how to live an extraordinarily rich spiritual life. At the centre of their life was the daily Eucharist as well as devotion to the Virgin Mary, to whom they prayed every evening with the Rosary, and consultation with wise spiritual directors. In this way they could accompany their children in vocational discernment, training them to appreciate everything 'from the roof up', as they often, charmingly, liked to say."
—Pope John Paul II

== Selected works by Corsini ==
Corsini wrote several books about education:

- (1912) La madre : nel problema educativo moderno
- (1924) Voce di madre : lettere ai giovani
- (1924?) Incontro al Re d'amore : raccolta di prediche
- (1940) Il fucco à da ardere
- (1950) Il libro della giovane
- (1955) Mamma vera
- (1968) Una testimonianza: M. Amabile Damiazzi

== See also ==
- Familiaris consortio, "On the Role of the Christian Family in the Modern World"
