= Guido of Acqui =

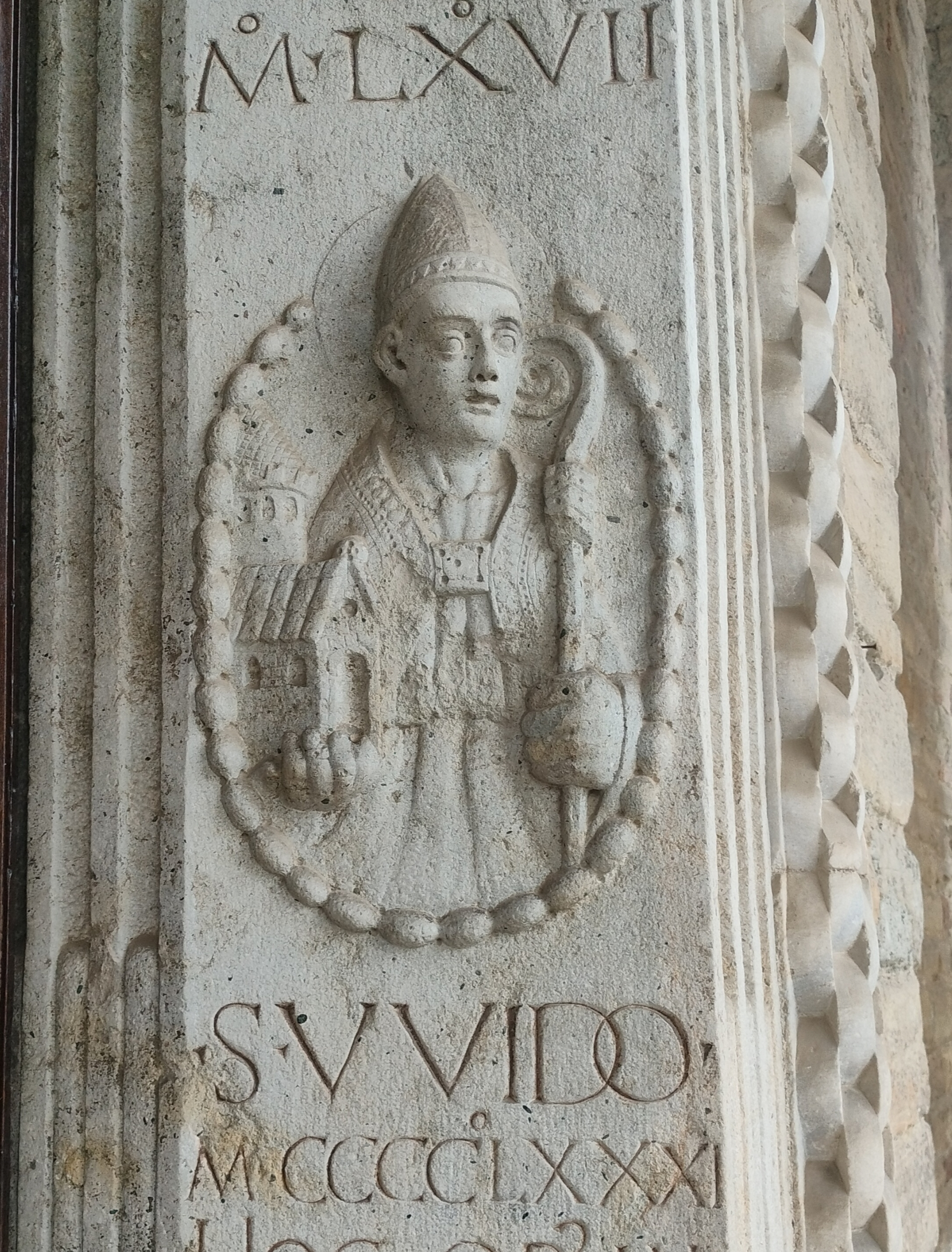

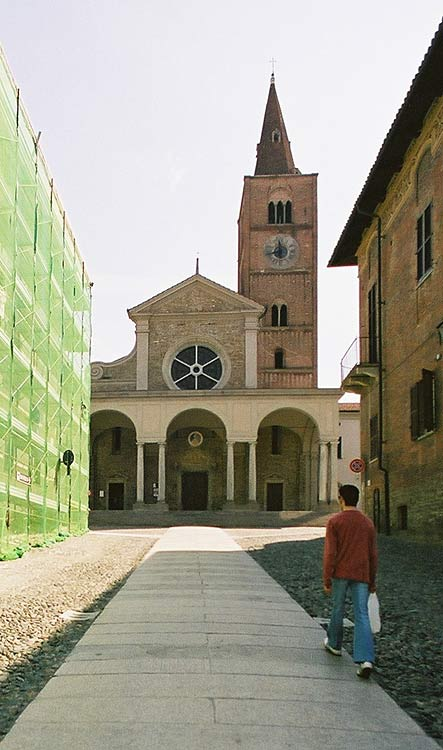
The cathedral at Acqui which was established by Saint Guido. (The campanile dates from the 13th-15th centuries, however, and the loggia from the 17th)

Saint Guido of Acqui (also Wido) (c. 1004 – 2 June 1070) was Bishop of Acqui (now Acqui Terme) in north-west Italy from 1034 until his death.

He was born around 1004 to a noble family of the area of Acqui, the Counts of Acquesana, in Melazzo, where the family's wealth was concentrated. He completed his education, by now an orphan, in Bologna. Elected bishop of Acqui in March 1034, his career was marked by reform in the areas of liturgy, spirituality and morality. He was generous in donating his own money and possessions to the diocese, in part to remove the economic pressure which had led to widespread corruption, and in part to support new projects. The latter included the promotion of the education of young women and the foundation of the nunnery of Santa Maria De Campis. Under his government, too, Acqui Cathedral was erected, dedicated to the Madonna Assunta and consecrated on 13 November 1067.

Guido died on 2 June 1070. His remains are preserved in the cathedral which he founded. His feast day is recorded in the Martyrologium Romanum as 2 June, the anniversary of his death. In Acqui, however, it is celebrated on the second Sunday of July.
