= Joseph Marello =

Italian Roman Catholic bishop

Saint Giuseppe Marello
- Bishop of Acqui
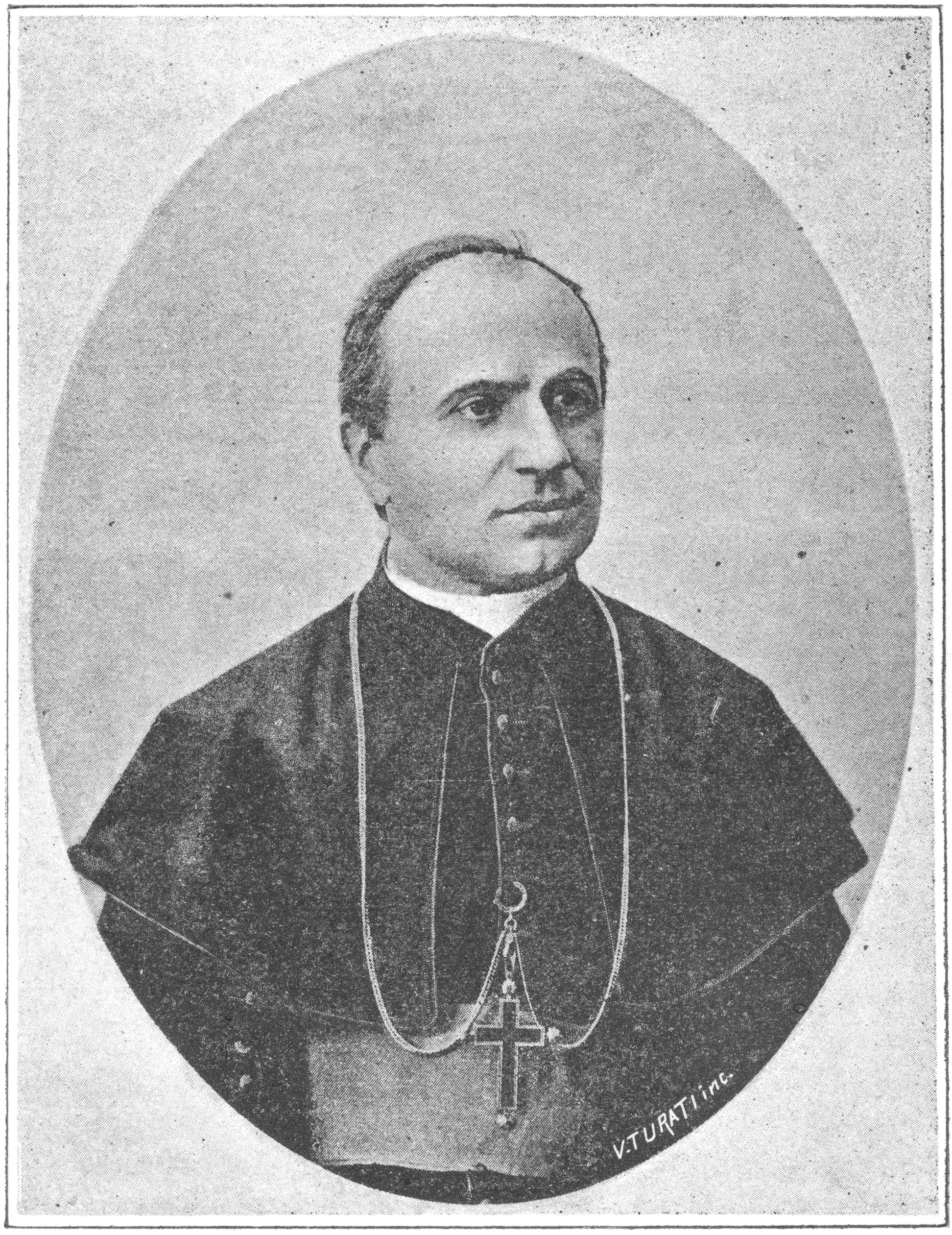
- Photograph c. 1889.
- Church: Roman Catholic Church
- Diocese: Acqui
- See: Acqui
- Appointed: 11 February 1889
- Installed: 16 June 1889
- Term ended: 30 May 1895
- Predecessor: Giuseppe Maria Sciandra
- Successor: Pietro Balestra

Orders
- Ordination: 19 September 1868 by Carlo Luigi Savio
- Consecration: 17 February 1889 by Raffaele Monaco La Valletta
- Rank: Bishop

Personal details
- Born: Giuseppe Stefano Chiaffredo Marello; 26 December 1844 Turin, Kingdom of Piedmont-Sardinia
- Died: 30 May 1895 (aged 50) Savona, Kingdom of Italy
- Motto: Iter para tutum ("Prepare a safe path")
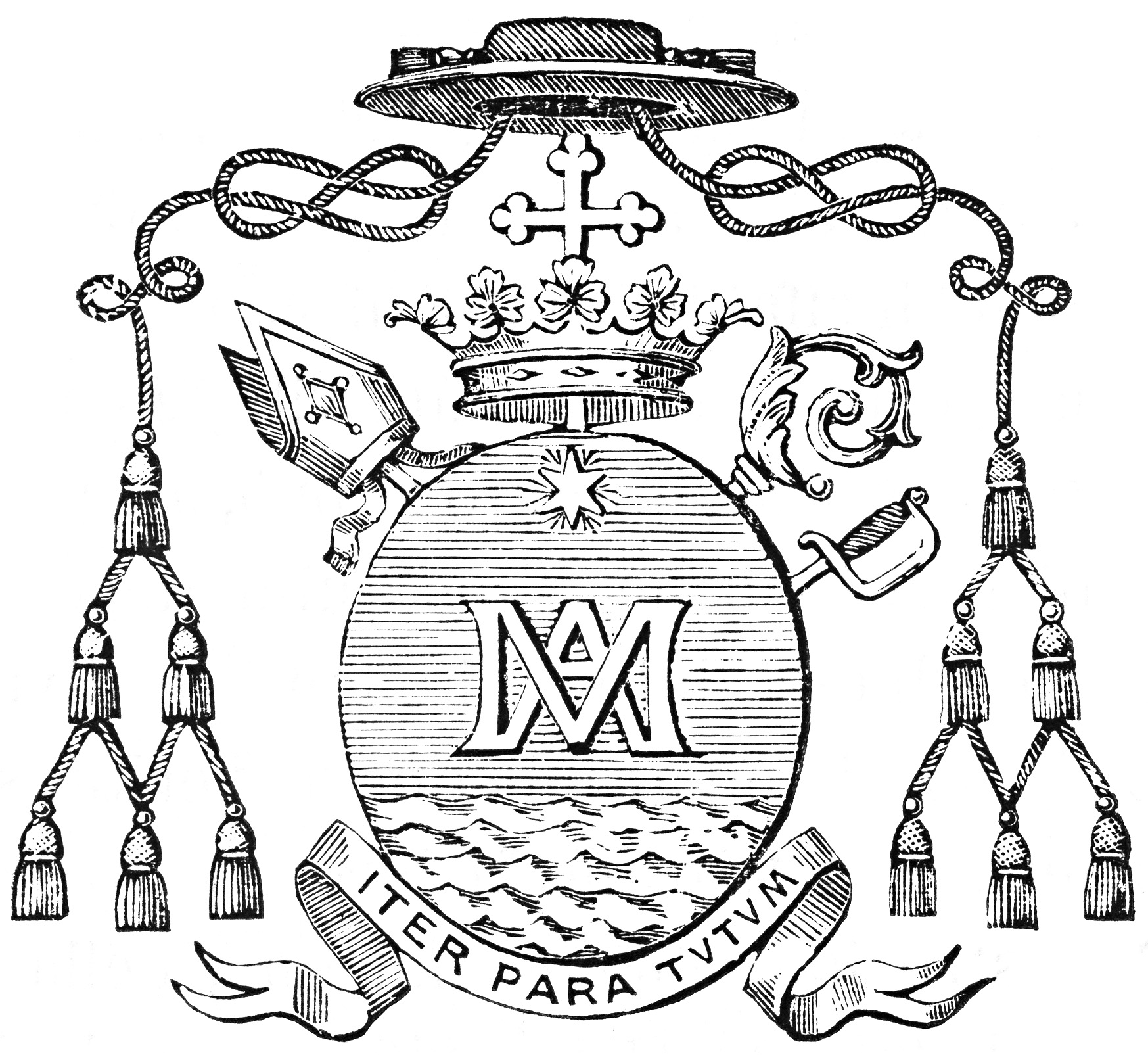
- Coat of arms

Sainthood
- Feast day: 30 May
- Venerated in: Roman Catholic Church
- Beatified: 26 September 1993; Asti, Italy by Pope John Paul II
- Canonized: 25 November 2001; Saint Peter's Square, Vatican City by Pope John Paul II
- Attributes: Episcopal attire
- Patronage: Oblates of Saint Joseph; Diocese of Acqui; Youth

Giuseppe Marello (known as Joseph Marello in English; 26 December 1844 – 30 May 1895) was an Italian Roman Catholic prelate who served as the Bishop of Acqui from 1889 until his death and was also the founder of the Oblates of Saint Joseph. Marello served as an aide to the Bishop of Asti prior to his episcopal appointment after Pope Leo XIII named him to head the Acqui diocese; the pope had known Marello while a cardinal when the pair participated in the First Vatican Council more than a decade before. He became a proponent for the poor and destitute and never stopped rendering his assistance to those who needed it the most; this was something he undertook even in his childhood. Bishop Marello issued several pastoral letters that dealt with a range of issues such as catechism and organized one big pastoral visitation to visit all parishes in his diocese.

Marello's cause for sainthood resulted in his beatification on 26 September 1993 in Asti and his canonization less than a decade later on 25 November 2001 in Saint Peter's Square.

== Life ==
=== Childhood and priesthood ===
Giuseppe Marello was born on 26 December 1844 on Bakers' Street in Turin to Vincenzo Marello and Anna Maria Viale, and he was baptized just hours later in the Corpus Domini church. He had a younger brother named Vittorio. His godparents were Chiaffredo Viale and Teresa Secco. He received his Confirmation on 15 August 1855 from the Bishop of Asti Filippo Artico. He was an altar server in his childhood, and he often invited the homeless to his home for food. His father was a friend of Giuseppe Benedetto Cottolengo.

Marello's mother died on 5 April 1848, and in 1852 his father decided to relocate with his children to San Martino Alfieri, where his paternal grandparents resided.

Marello began his studies for the priesthood on 31 October 1856, but his father wished him to continue with his education and take up a career in business. But in December 1863 Giuseppe contracted typhus and promised the Virgin Mary that if he survived he would continue his studies to become a priest. He recovered, and attributed the cure to Our Lady of Consolation. He continued on with his ecclesial studies in February 1864. At one stage he considered becoming a Carthusian monk, but the new Bishop of Asti, Carlo Savio, dissuaded him, suggesting that God had other plans for him. Marello underwent the clerical investiture on 9 January 1864, and received both the tonsure and all minor orders from Bishop Savio on 21 December 1867. He was made a subdeacon on 28 March 1868, and was elevated to the diaconate on 6 June 1868. Marello was ordained to the priesthood on 19 September 1868 with Savio again officiating. The new priest celebrated his first Mass on 20 September 1868 in San Martino Alfieri.

After his ordination, he became the private assistant to Bishop Savio at Asti on 21 October 1868. He served in that capacity until 1881. On 2 March 1880 he was named a Canon of the Asti Cathedral. He was also friends with Giovanni Bosco and Leonardo Murialdo. He attended the First Vatican Council with Bishop Savio and it was there that he met Cardinal Gioacchino Pecci – the future Pope Leo XIII – who praised the priest for his virtues and talents. He and Savio went to Rome on 21 November 1869 and were there until late July 1870; he even had the chance to meet Pope Pius IX. His father died on 17 May 1873. Later he took over an Asti retirement home to save it from being bankrupt and he soon became the spiritual director and catechist in his local diocese. On 14 March 1878 he founded the Oblates of Saint Joseph which would be dedicated to caring for the poor and educating children and adolescents as well as rendering assisting bishops in whatever capacities were required.

=== Episcopate ===
Pope Leo XIII appointed him Bishop of Acqui on 11 February 1889. The formal appointment as a bishop came on 11 February 1889 during a consistory for the elevation of new cardinals after having received word of his appointment in November 1888 (in the late morning) since the pope wanted to invest new bishops with the rochet at the consistory. From 5:30 to 6:15pm on 10 February he met with the pope and that evening had dinner with Cardinal Luigi Oreglia di Santo Stefano. He received his episcopal consecration on 17 February, from Cardinal Raffaele Monaco La Valletta in the Capuchin Santa Maria della Concezione dei Cappuccini in Rome. The co-consecrators were the Archbishop of Chieti Rocco Cocchia and the Archbishop of Damiata Ignazio Persico.

He visited all the parishes in his diocese and wrote six pastoral letters to his flock. He issued his first pastoral letter on the subject of peace on 31 May 1889 and issued another on 2 February 1890 regarding a pastoral visitation that he would undertake. From 13 April 1890 to 1895 he visited 143 individual parishes. On 16 December 1890 he received an honorary degree in sacred theology from the Theological College of Saint Thomas in Genoa, and then issued a third pastoral letter regarding penance on 13 January 1891. On 26 September 1891 he participated in a pilgrimage to Rome for the third centennial of the death of Aloysius Gonzaga and later on 4 February 1892 issued another pastoral letter on the subject of Christian education. Bishop Marello issued another one on 25 January 1893 regarding the profession of faith. From 14 to 28 February 1893 he went to Rome to celebrate the 50th anniversary of Pope Leo XIII's episcopal consecration though on 23 February made a detour to Naples to visit the Pompeii shrine. He issued another pastoral letter on catechism on 20 January 1894 and a final one on 8 February 1895 regarding missions and the propagation of the faith.

=== Death ===
Marello travelled to Savona, arriving on 26 May, to participate in a celebration of the third centennial of Philip Neri. He died of a cerebral hemorrhage on 30 May 1895.

Marello was due to leave a week after the centennial celebration, but wanted to offer his respects to Bishop Giuseppe Boraggini of the diocese of Savona (1879–1897), who was not there, and so Marello decided to stay longer in the town until Boraggini's return; this was on 27 May 1895, after he celebrated what would be his final Mass. Marello first went on a Marian pilgrimage in the town and then called on the bishop that evening; he was exhausted but accepted a dinner invitation. But as the bishop showed him the room where Pope Pius VII was once confined in he fainted and was rushed to a bed. The illness did not seem at all serious, so his aide telegrammed the Acqui diocese vicar-general to give word the illness would keep the bishop out of his see for a little while. But his acute headaches caused even the slightest noise to torment him. On 28 May his two doctors thought they saw an improvement that indicated he might soon be able to leave, but the bishop's condition deteriorated on 29 May, and grew worse around 4:30pm on 30 May, when he managed with difficulty to utter a few garbled and incoherent words.

The cerebral hemorrhage claimed his life at 6:00pm on 30 May. His funeral was celebrated on 1 June. Leo XIII said of his death at a general audience in Rome in 1891: "he was a gem among bishops". His remains were exhumed and relocated to his order's motherhouse on 30 June 1923. His order received diocesan approval on 18 March 1901 and papal approval from Pope Pius X on 11 April 1909.

== Parish ==
The first parish church named after Giuseppe Marello was dedicated in Granite Bay, California, in the United States of America on 22 October 2011 at a celebration presided over by Bishop Jaime Soto along with the parish pastor Arnold Ortiz.

== Sainthood ==
The informative process for beatification opened in the Acqui diocese on 23 November 1924 and it concluded in April 1928 while another informative process was opened in Asti from 22 December 1924 and concluded in April 1928 much like the Acqui process; his spiritual writings and other collections received theological approval on 4 May 1937 and a supplementary process was held in Acqui from 1941 to 1942. The formal introduction to the cause came under Pope Pius XII on 28 May 1948 and Marello became titled as a Servant of God. An apostolic process was later held from 10 October 1948 to 21 April 1951 while the Congregation for Rites validated all previous processes in Rome on 17 March 1954. The Congregation for the Causes of Saints (C.C.S.) and their consultants met and approved the cause on 25 October 1977. The confirmation of Marello's model life of heroic virtue allowed for Pope Paul VI to title the late bishop as Venerable on 12 May 1978.

For Marello to be beatified one miracle needed to be approved – a healing that science could not explain. One such case was investigated in the diocese of its origin and it later received C.C.S. validation prior to a panel of medical experts approving it on 17 December 1992. Theologians concurred with the verdict on 19 February 1993 as did the C.C.S. themselves on 16 March 1993. Pope John Paul II approved the miracle on 2 April 1993 and presided over Marello's beatification in Asti on 26 September 1993. The miracle in question was the 1944 cure of the seminarian Aldo Falconetti who suffered from tubercular meningitis.

The second miracle that was investigated took place in Peru and was the simultaneous healing of the children Alfredo and Isilia Chávez León who were both cured from bronchopneumonia. The C.C.S. validated the diocesan process on 12 November 1999 and a medical panel of experts approved it on 13 April 2000; theologians also approved it on 3 July 2000 as did the C.C.S. on 20 November 2000. John Paul II issued his final approval to this miracle on 18 December 2000 and in a 13 March 2001 consistory scheduled the date. John Paul II canonized Marello in Saint Peter's Square on 25 November 2001.
