= Santuario della Madonna del Divino Amore =

- Shrine of Our Lady of Divine Love
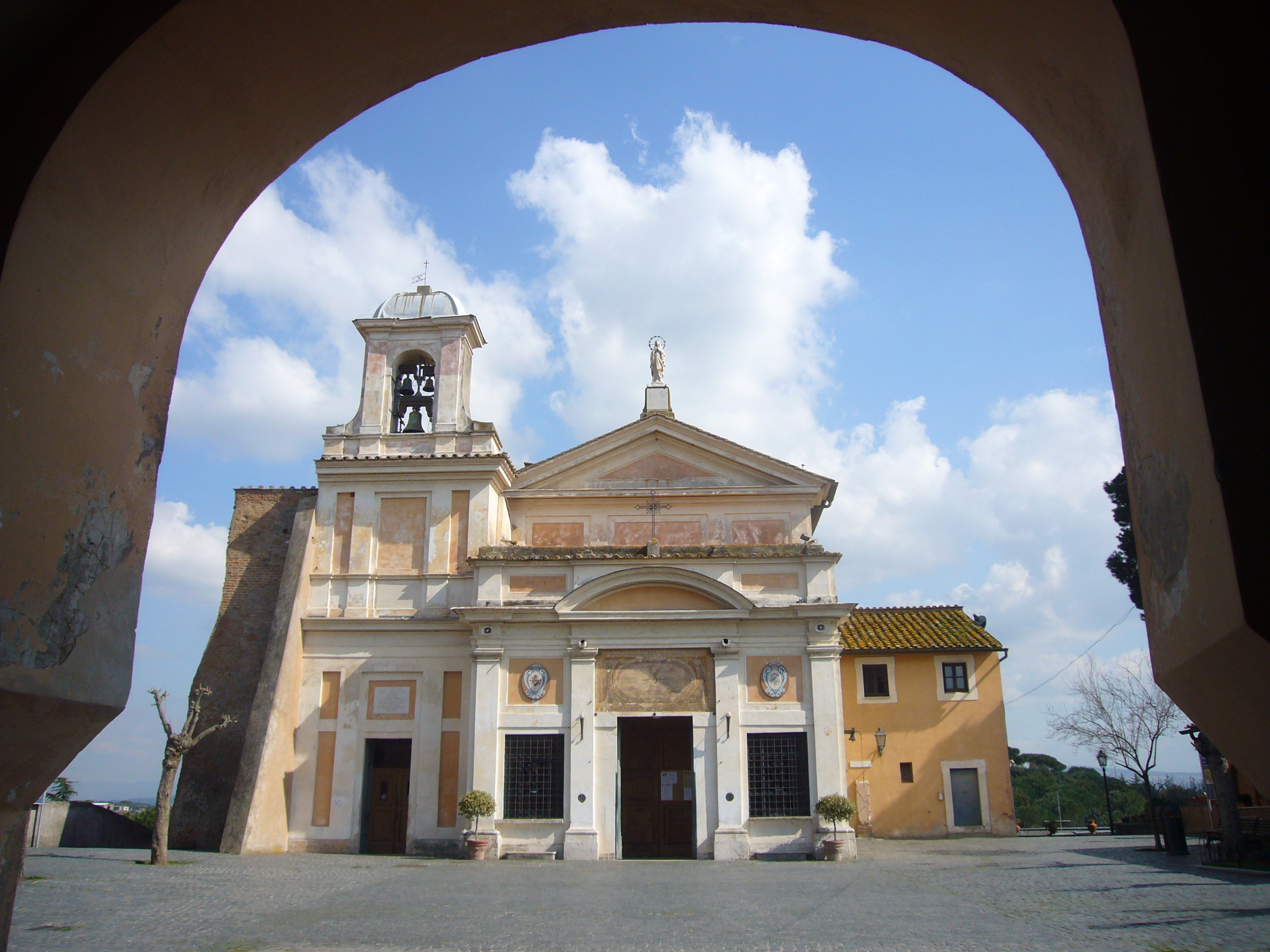
- Shrine of Our Lady of Divine Love
- Santuario della Madonna del Divino Amore
- 41°46′43″N 12°32′37″E
- Location: Via Ardeatina, Rome, Italy
- Denomination: Roman Catholic
- Website: Official website

History
- Status: Parish church, Shrine, One of the Seven Pilgrim Churches of Rome

Architecture
- Architectural type: Church

Administration
- Diocese: Diocese of Rome

Clergy
- Priest: Enrico Feroci

Santuario della Madonna del Divino Amore, or the Shrine of Our Lady of Divine Love, is a Roman Catholic shrine in the southern outskirts of Rome dedicated to the Blessed Virgin Mary that consists of two churches: an old church built in 1745 and a new church added to the sanctuary in 1999. The church was included by Pope John Paul II in the pilgrimage of Seven Pilgrim Churches of Rome during the Holy Year 2000.

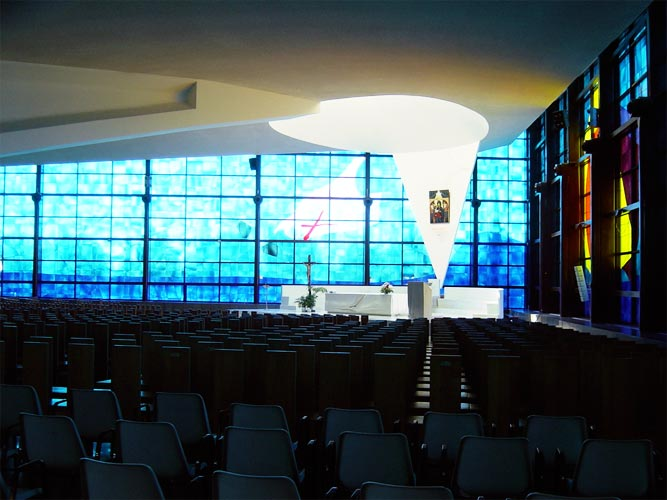
The inside of the new church

== History ==
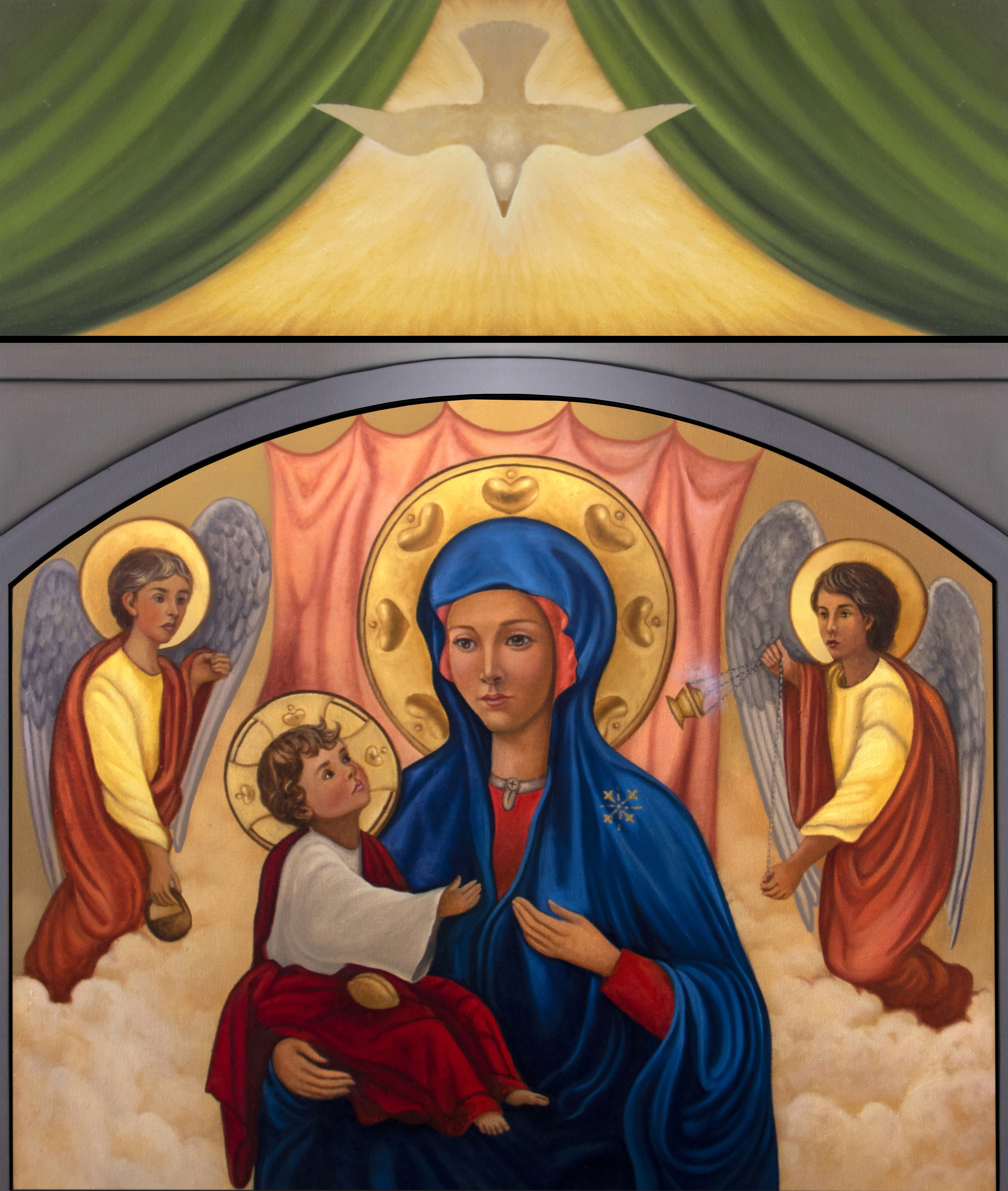
Santa María del Divino Amor

In 1295 the property belonged to the Savelli-Orsini family, who built a castle surrounded by a boundary wall and protected by six or eight towers. The property changed hands several times and by the early eighteenth century the estate had fallen into ruin. One of the towers of a gatehouse, known as the Castel di Leva, was decorated with a medieval fresco, a votive image of the Madonna and Child. The painting, whose artist is unknown, portrayed the Virgin Mary sitting on a Throne and holding the child Jesus in her arms. A dove descends upon her as a symbol of the Holy Spirit. Local shepherds who grazed their flocks nearby during the winter would often meet here to pray the Rosary. In 1740, a pilgrim was attacked by angry dogs near the gatehouse and, according to the tradition, was saved through the intercession of the Blessed Virgin Mary. Seeing the image, the man invoked the Mother of God for help. Immediately, the dogs calmed down and ran off into the countryside. Word spread of this occurrence, and the following September the painting was moved to a nearby estate called "La Falconiana", where a small church dedicated to the Virgin under the title Santa Maria ad Magos (St Mary of the Magi) stood.

On Easter Monday, April 19, 1745, the painting was returned to a new church, built near the site of the old tower. On 31 May 1750, Cardinal Carlo Rezzonico (later Pope Clement XIII) consecrated the altar in the church to Our Lady of Divine Love.

The church became a site of pilgrimage. With the increase of devotion from the people in the countryside, the church was entrusted to a hermit guardian, the first of which was Pasquale Francesco. After the fall of the Papal State in 1870 and the confiscation of church property, the property again falls into a period of neglect and decay, although the devotion of the faithful to Our Lady of Divine Love continues. Sancte Marie de Divino Amore (in English: Saint Mary of Love Divine) is a devotional title in the Catholic Church for Mary, the mother of Jesus. The image received canonical coronation on 13 May 1883 and can now be used by the faithful when addressing Mary for intercessions under this title. In December 1932, a parish was established and Don Umberto Terenzi appointed rector and the first parish priest. In March 1942 he founded the Congregation of the Daughters of Our Lady of Divine Love.

During World War II, the fresco was moved to the church of St. Ignatius. Pope Pius XII and many Romans visited the shrine to pray for the Holy Mother's intercession that the city be spared. On June 11, 1944 Pius XII went to pray before the Image of the Virgin, surrounded by an immense crowd, and bestows the title of Salvatrice dell'Urbe. In 1962, the Oblate Priests were founded, who since then serve the shrine. The pilgrimages increase, especially from Whit Monday until autumn. The shrine presently on the site is new, and was inaugurated by Pope John Paul II on July 4, 1999. Pope John Paul II included the shrine in the Seven Pilgrim Churches of Rome and the pilgrim itinerary for the Holy Year 2000, replacing San Sebastiano fuori le Mura.

Behind the chapel is a staircase that leads down to the gate tower where the miracle occurred in 1740.

Pope Francis visited the shrine on 1 May 2018 to say the rosary, marking the start of the month dedicated to Mary.

On March 11, 2020, during the quarantine of Italy as a result of the novel coronavirus pandemic, Pope Francis prayed before the image of Our Lady of Divine Love during a video broadcast, saying, "We entrust ourselves to you, Health of the Sick, who at the cross took part in Jesus’ pain, keeping your faith firm.... You, Salvation of the Roman People, know what we need, and we are sure you will provide so that, as in Cana of Galilee, we may return to joy and to feasting after this time of trial."

=== Cardinal deaconry ===
On 28 November 2020, it was made a titular church to be held by a cardinal-deacon.

- Enrico Feroci (2020–present)

== Interior ==
The miraculous painting is enshrined above the altar. The mosaics in the apse are modern, and shows Christ in the centre, and the miracle on the left.

In the crypt is the tomb of the married couple Bl. Luigi (Aloysius) Beltrame Quattrocchi and Bl. Maria Corsini Beltrame Quattrocchi. He died in 1951, and she in 1965. After their deaths, a beatification process was started. They were beatified on 21 October 2001 by Pope John Paul II, and this was the first time that a married couple had been beatified together. Their relics were moved here on 28 October 2001. The feast of Bl. Luigi and Maria Corsini Beltrame Quattrocchi is celebrated on 25 November, their wedding day.
