= Oblates of St. Joseph =

Catholic religious institute for men

Oblates of Saint Joseph
- Congregatio Oblatorum S. Ioseph
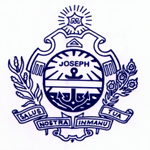
- Abbreviation: OSJ
- Founded: 1878; 148 years ago
- Founder: Bishop Joseph Marello
- Founded at: Asti, Italy
- Type: Clerical Religious Congregation
- Headquarters: Rome, Italy
- Members: 627 (450 priests) (2017)
- Superior General: Jan Pelczarski, OSJ
- Parent organization: Catholic Church
- Website: https://www.oblatidisangiuseppe.com/

The Oblates of Saint Joseph (Latin: Congregatio Oblatorum S. Ioseph; abbreviated OSJ) is a Catholic religious institute founded on 14 March 1878 by St. Joseph Marello and dedicated to Saint Joseph. The institute has provinces or delegations in Italy, the Philippines, the United States, Mexico, Peru, Brazil, Bolivia, India, Poland, and Nigeria. The congregation also has members in Australia and Indonesia.

== History ==
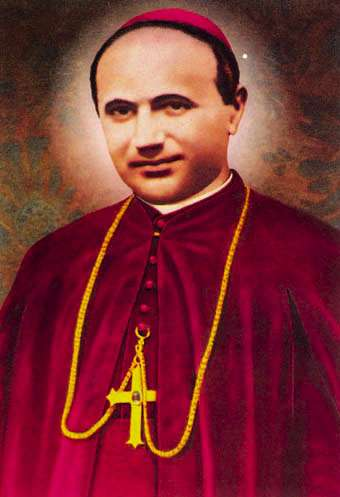
Saint Joseph Marello, who founded the Oblates of Saint Joseph

Joseph Marello's original intent was to found a simple association of men dedicated to a common spirituality, serving the local church in catechesis and assisting local clergy, but not publicly professing canonical vows in a religious institute.

On March 14, 1878, he opened a house for what he called the "Company of Saint Joseph" and invited four candidates to be members. By 1883, the company had begun accepting candidates for the priesthood along with candidates to be lay brothers. The company would eventually become known as the Oblates of Saint Joseph. On September 15, 1921, the Oblates received approval as an international institute of pontifical status.

== Apostolates and Ministries ==
The principal apostolate of the Oblates of St. Joseph is to work with youth and the poor. However, Joseph Marello's initial plan was to have the Oblates serve in whatever capacity the local bishop deemed necessary, so long as it was consistent with the spirituality and life of the Oblates. Presently, the Oblates serve in many different capacities, depending upon the needs of the bishops where they serve. Common apostolates include education and catechesis of youth, parish ministry, serving the poor and underprivileged, and orphanages.

== Organization ==
The Oblates of St. Joseph are led by a Superior General and the four-member General Council. Geographic regions are organized into Provinces and Delegations, each of which is headed by a Provincial or Delegate, respectively.

The Superior General and his Council serve for a six-year term; Provincials and Delegates serve for three-year terms. Each community has a superior or Rector, who also serves a three-year term. Oblates of St. Joseph are bound by their Rule to live in community, unless exceptional permission is granted.

== See also ==
- Saint Joseph
- Josephology
