= Padre Vicente Garcia Memorial Academy =

Private school in Batangas, Philippines

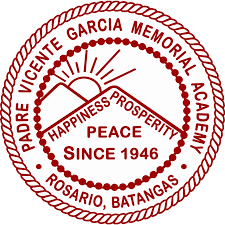

Location
- Y. Zuño Street; Rosario, Batangas; Philippines; 13°50′48″N 121°12′22″E

Information
- Type: Private
- Motto: Your Partner in Education since 1946
- Established: 1946; 80 years ago
- Founder: Dr. Melecio Z. Bolaños; Crisanto A. Gualberto; Fidel Luna; Jose P. Recto
- Principal: Dr. Jayson O. Gulpan
- President: Dr. Jayson O. Gulpan
- Language: English, Filipino
- Color: Maroon
- Nickname: PVGMA
- Website: www.pvgma.com Archived September 14, 2019, at the Wayback Machine

The Padre Vicente Garcia Memorial Academy (also referred to as PVGMA or the Academy) is a private, non-sectarian secondary school located in Poblacion B, Rosario, Batangas, Philippines. Established in 1946, the school offers strands including STEM, HUMSS, and ABM.

== History ==
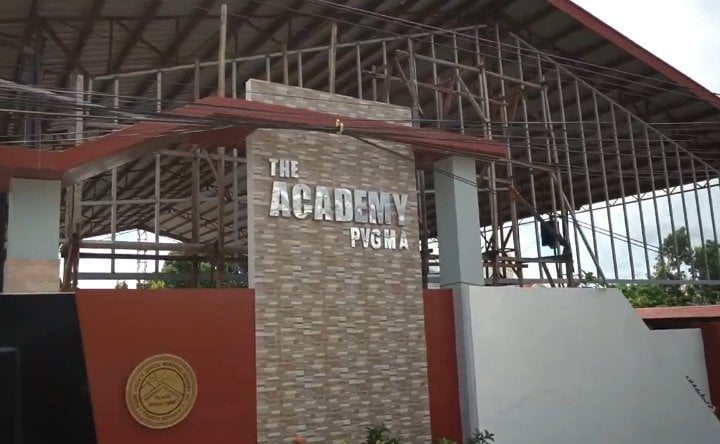
Padre Vicente Garcia Memorial Academy front building (2020)

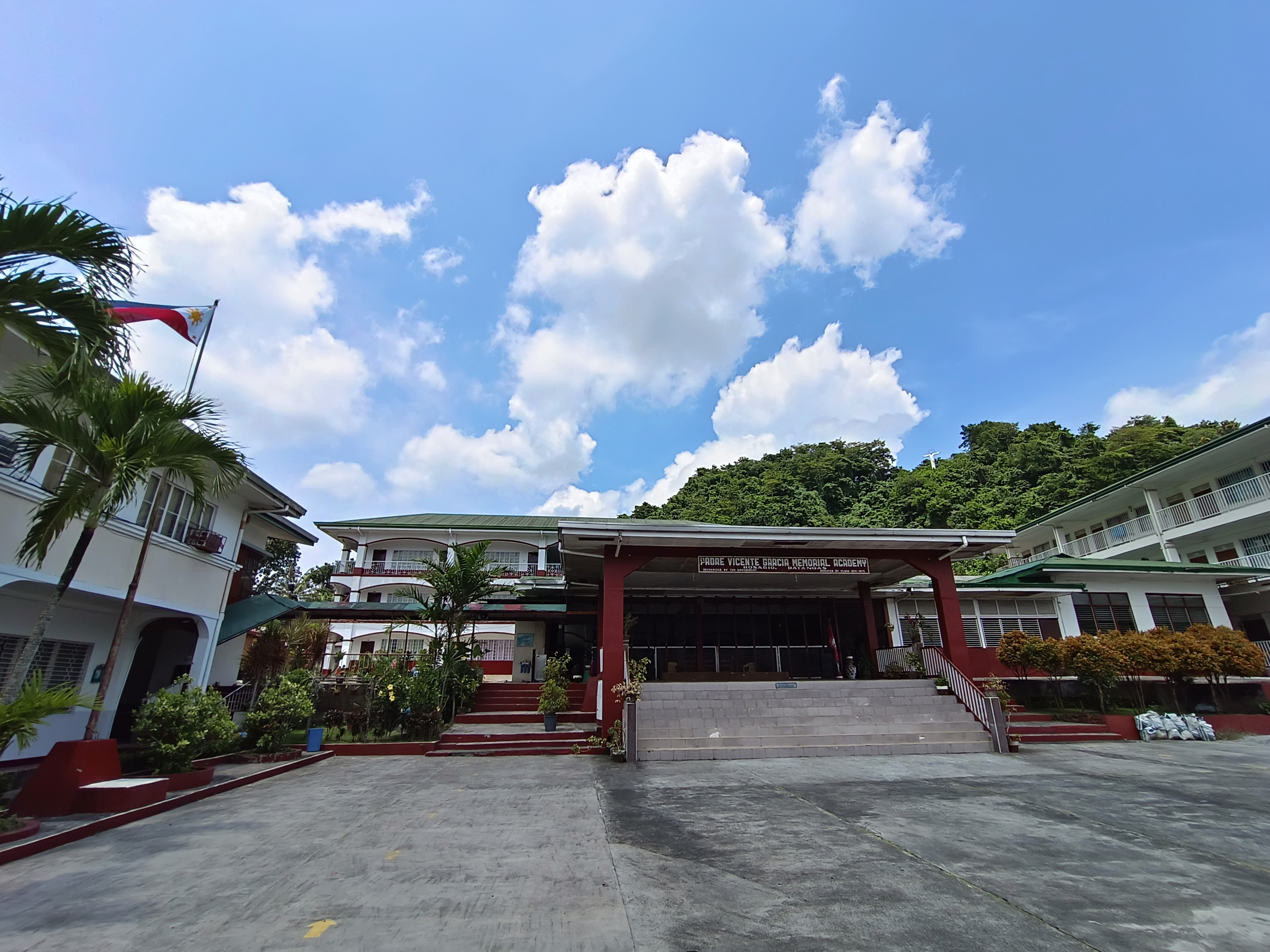
PVGMA campus at the foot of Tombol Hill

Padre Vicente Garcia Memorial Academy was established in 1946 in honor of the Filipino priest Fr. Vicente García y Teodoro. The institution was founded by Dr. Melecio Z. Bolaños, Crisanto A. Gualberto, Fidel Luna, and Mayor Jose P. Recto. Dr. Bolaños served as the first president of the academy, succeeded by Recto. The academy was named to reflect Padre Garcia's dedication to God and country.

As the first high school in Rosario, Batangas, Padre Vicente Garcia Memorial Academy commenced its inaugural classes on July 1, 1946. Initial lectures were conducted at the residences of Jose Maranan and Antonino Luancing.

Following the death of Bolaños, the leadership of the academy was entrusted to Jose P. Recto as president, Lucio Magsino as secretary, Fidel Luna as treasurer, and Crisanto A. Gualberto as auditor. The main school building, constructed in 1947, was made of nipa and sawali (woven bamboo mats) from Pampanga.

During the COVID-19 pandemic, the implementation of blended learning at the academy included the adoption of Genyo e-learning, provided by Diwa Learning Systems Inc., to facilitate the continuation of educational activities.

== Academics ==
The school's Basic Education Department (BED) offers the following programs:

- Junior High School (Grades 7–10)
- Senior High School (Grades 11–12)
  - Academic Track:
    - Accountancy, Business and Management (ABM)
    - Science, Technology, Engineering, and Mathematics (STEM)
    - Humanities and Social Sciences (HUMSS)

== Notable alumni ==
- Jovencito Zuño – Chief State Prosecutor of the Philippines (1997–2010)
