= Jovencito Zuño =

Chief State Prosecutor of the Philippines
- In office 1997–2010

Personal details
- Born: Jovencito R. Zuño; February 8, 1945 Rosario, Batangas, Philippines
- Died: July 29, 2026
- Education: Lipa City Colleges
- Profession: Prosecutor

Jovencito R. Zuño is a former Filipino prosecutor who served as the chief state prosecutor of the Philippines from 1997 to 2010.

== Early life and education ==
Born in Rosario, Batangas, Zuño completed his high school education at Padre Vicente Garcia Memorial Academy in Rosario, Batangas. It was during his time at the academy that he first entertained thoughts of pursuing a career in law. Zuño earned his Bachelor of Laws from Lipa City Colleges in 1963.

== Career ==
Zuño began his legal career as a Special Counsel to the Office of the Prosecutor in Batangas City from 1975 to 1980. He then served as First Assistant City Fiscal at the Office of the City Prosecutor in Lipa City and later as Acting City Fiscal in 1983. In 1985, he joined the Department of Justice (DOJ) as State Prosecutor I. He was appointed as Chief State Prosecutor in 1997, a position he held for 13 years, overseeing approximately 1,750 prosecutors nationwide.

== Retirement and post-retirement activities ==
Zuño retired from the DOJ in February 2010, concluding a 35-year career in public service. After retirement, he continued to contribute to public service as an Advisory Board Member of the United Coconut Planters Bank and as a former Legal Consultant for the Senate Blue Ribbon Committee.

== Notable cases ==
Throughout his career, Zuño was involved in significant legal proceedings, including administrative cases and high-profile investigations. Notably, he was a complainant in an administrative case against Judge Baltazar Dizon, highlighting issues of legal competence and the application of special laws.

== Legacy ==
Zuño's dedication to justice and public service has left a lasting impact on the Philippine legal system.
