= Journal of Surgery =

Journal of Surgery may refer to

- Journal of Surgery (OMICS Publishing Group journal), published by OMICS Publishing Group
- Journal of Surgery (Science Publishing Group journal), published by Science Publishing Group
