= Sinukmani Festival =

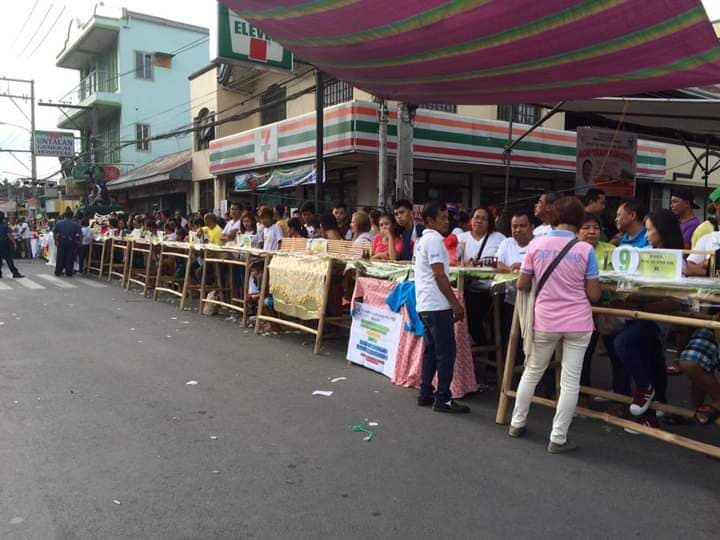
- Sinukmani Festival 2016
- Official name: Sinukmani Festival
- Observed by: Rosario, Batangas
- Date: June 9
- Frequency: Annual

The Sinukmani Festival is a festival in Rosario, Batangas, Philippines, held annually on June 9. Local establishments participate by setting up a long table, spanning 462 meters, laid out with the sticky rice pastry topped with sweet caramel. Rosario is known as the "Rice Granary of Batangas".
