= Rosario, Batangas =

Municipality in Batangas, Philippines

Rosario
- Municipality
- Municipality of Rosario
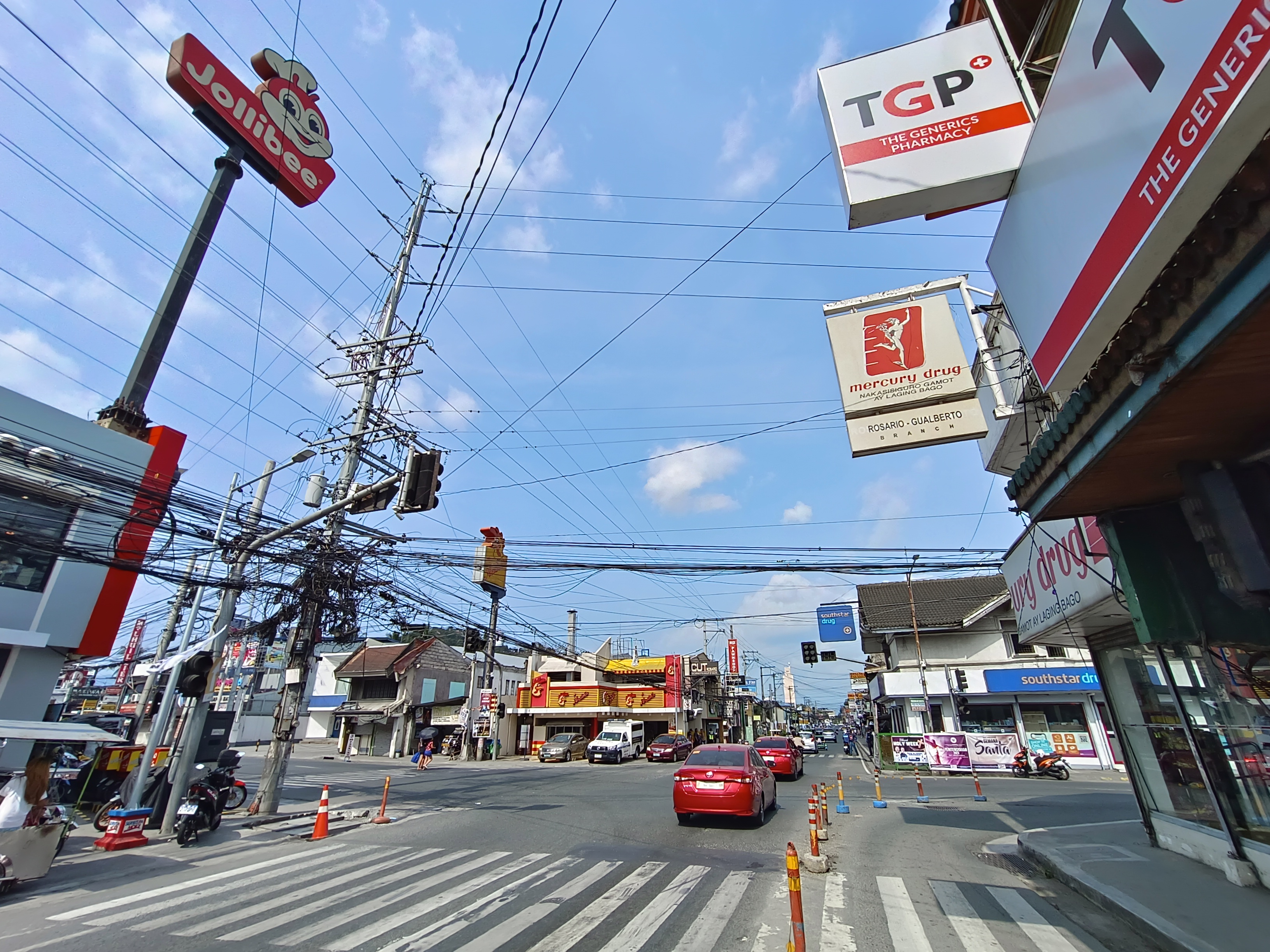
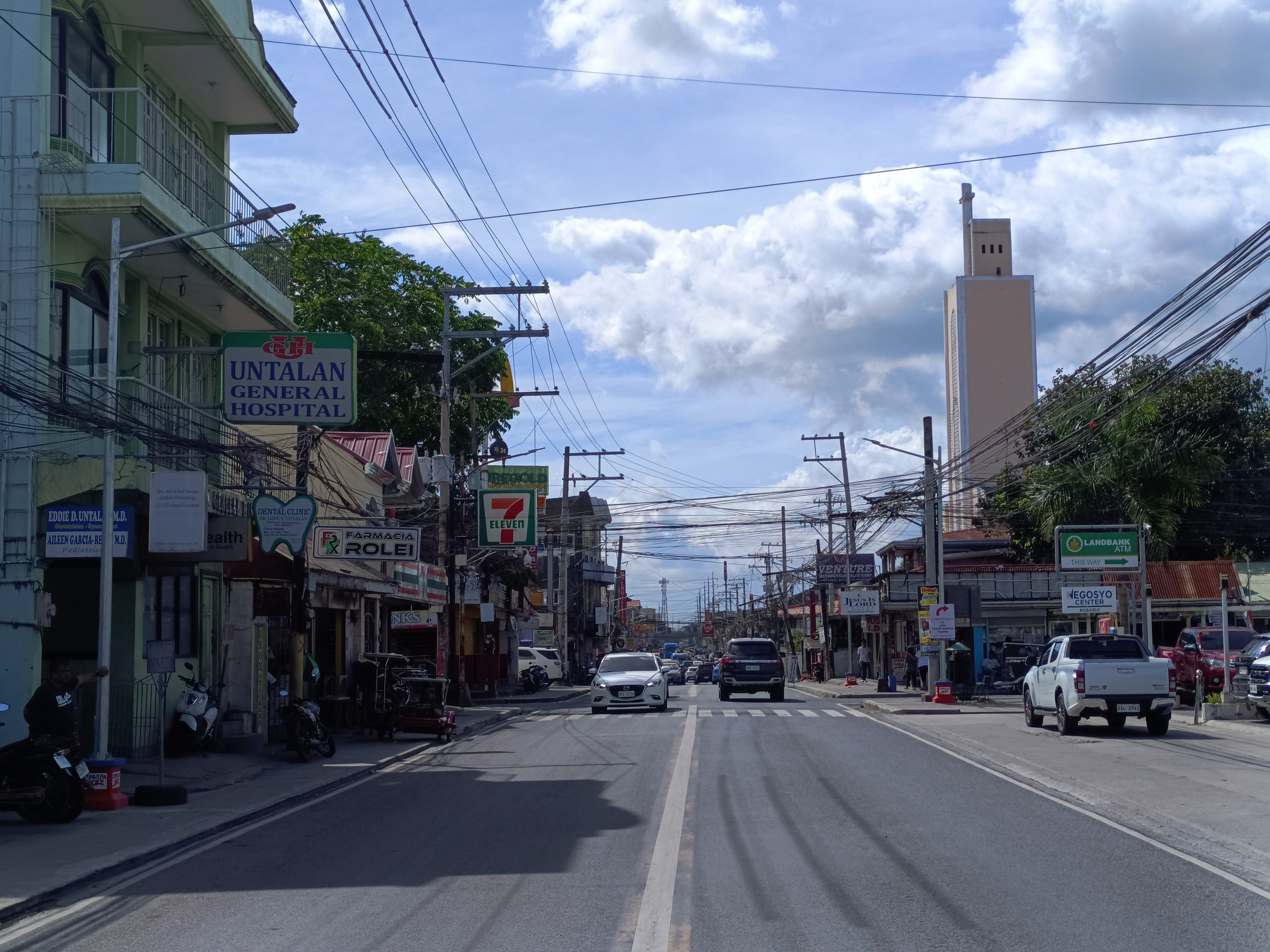
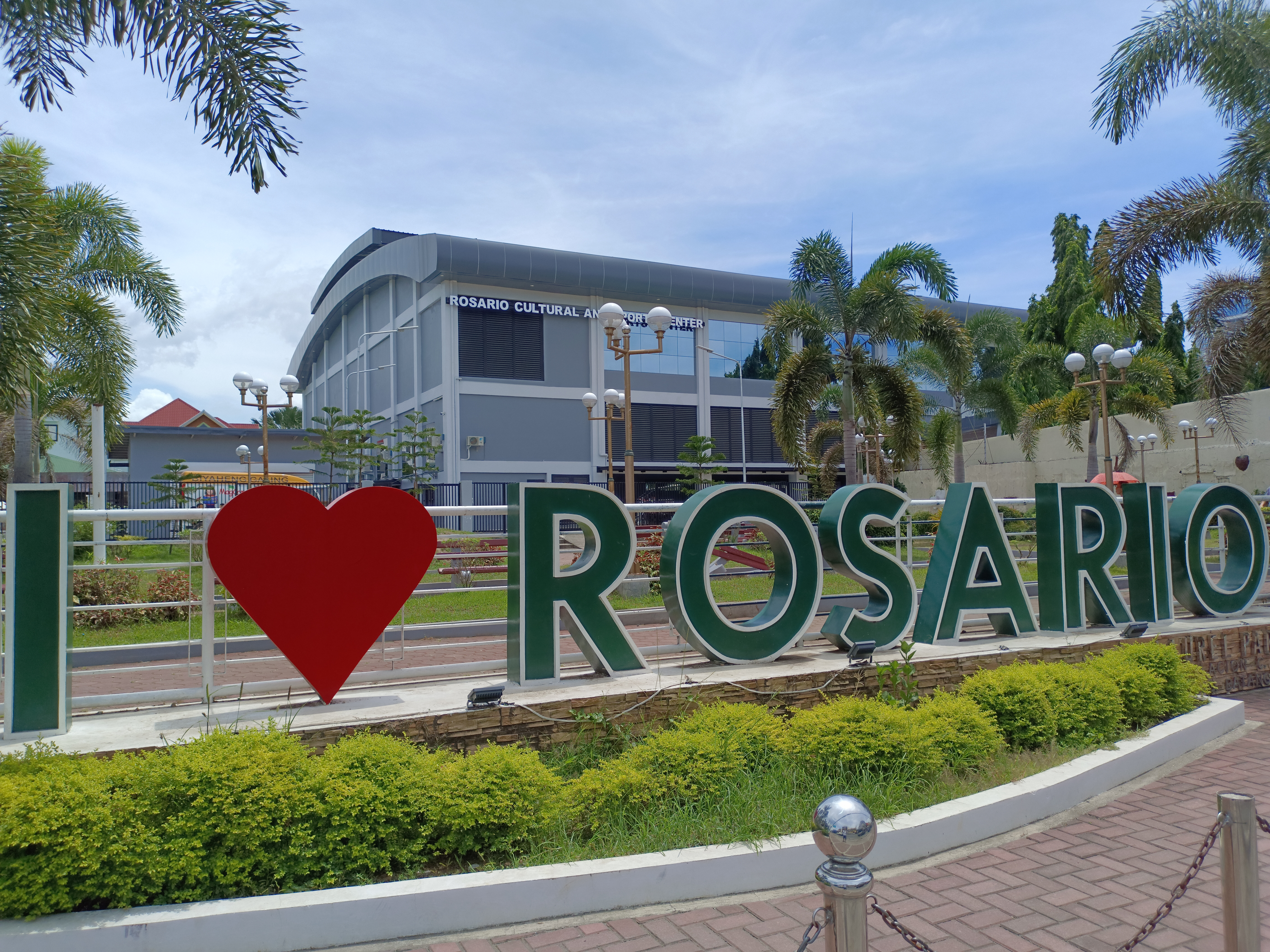
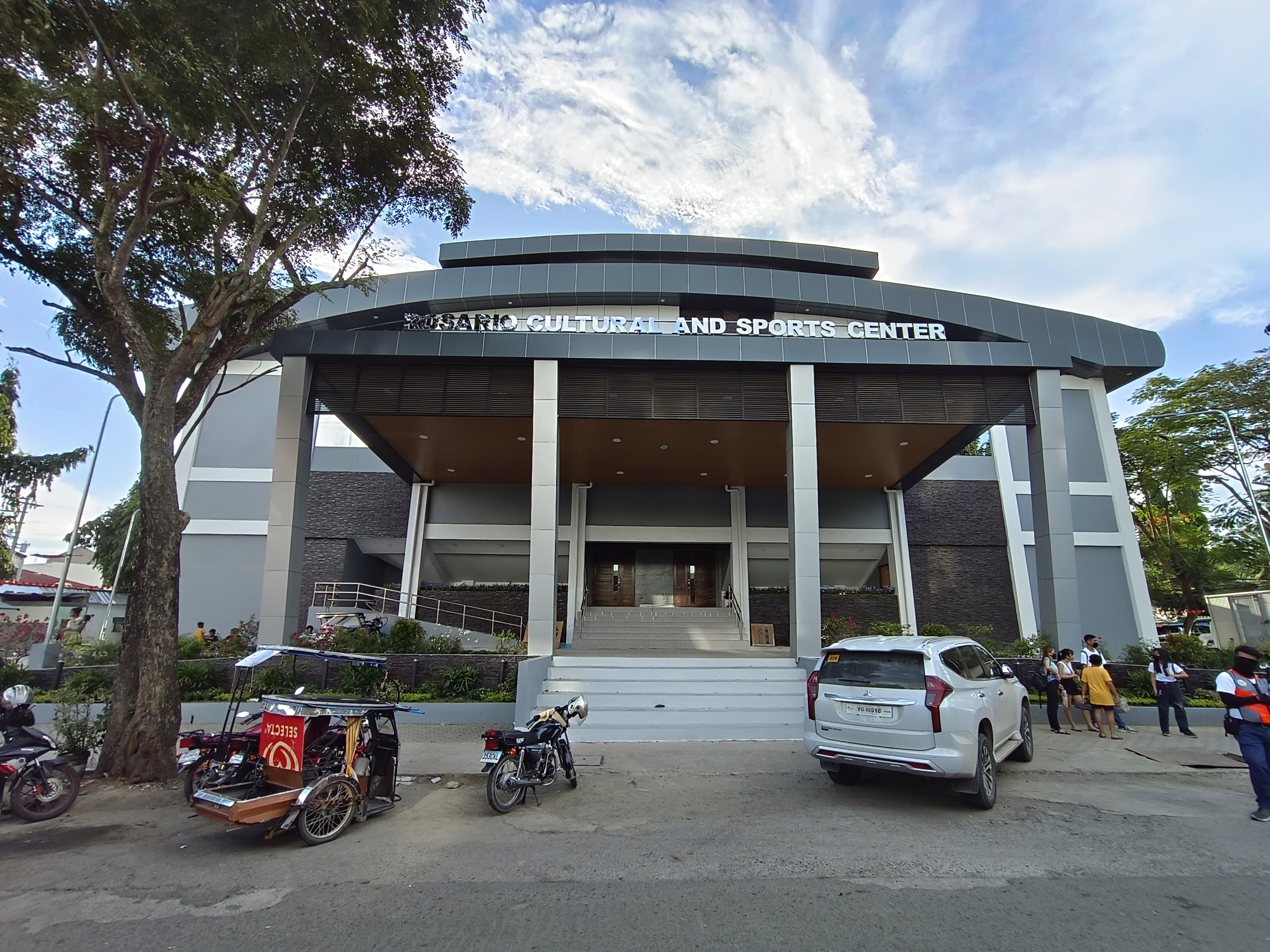
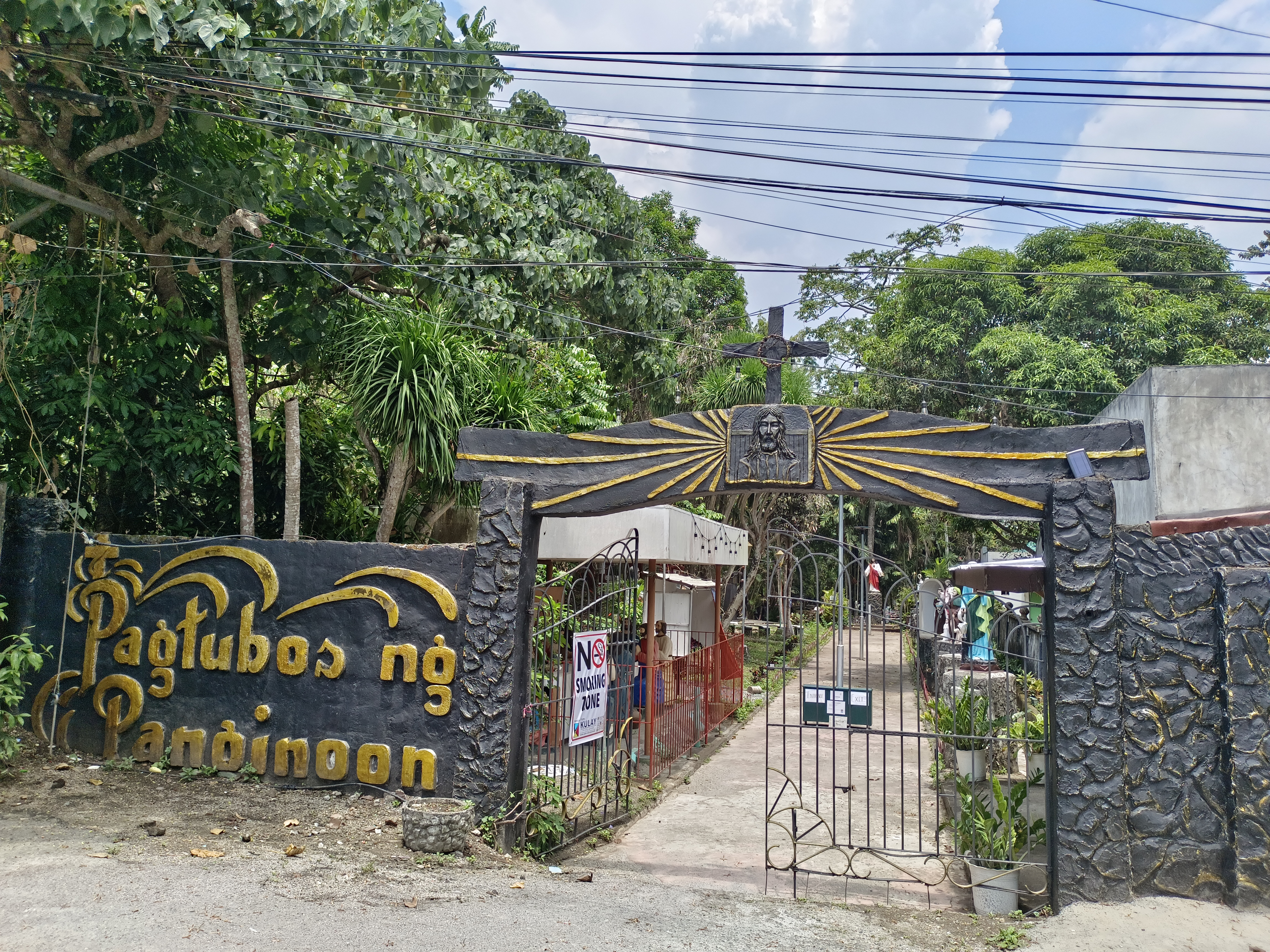
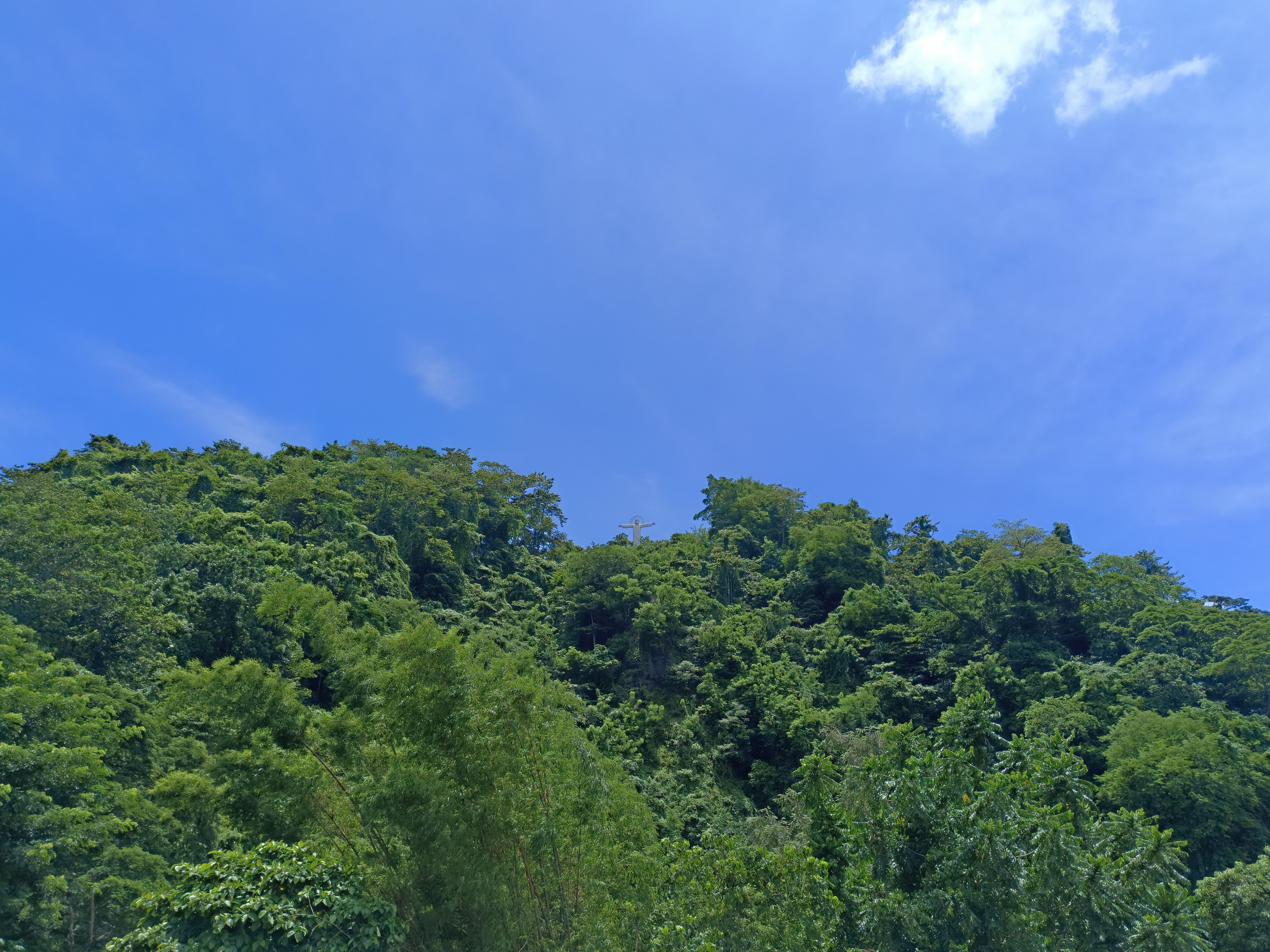
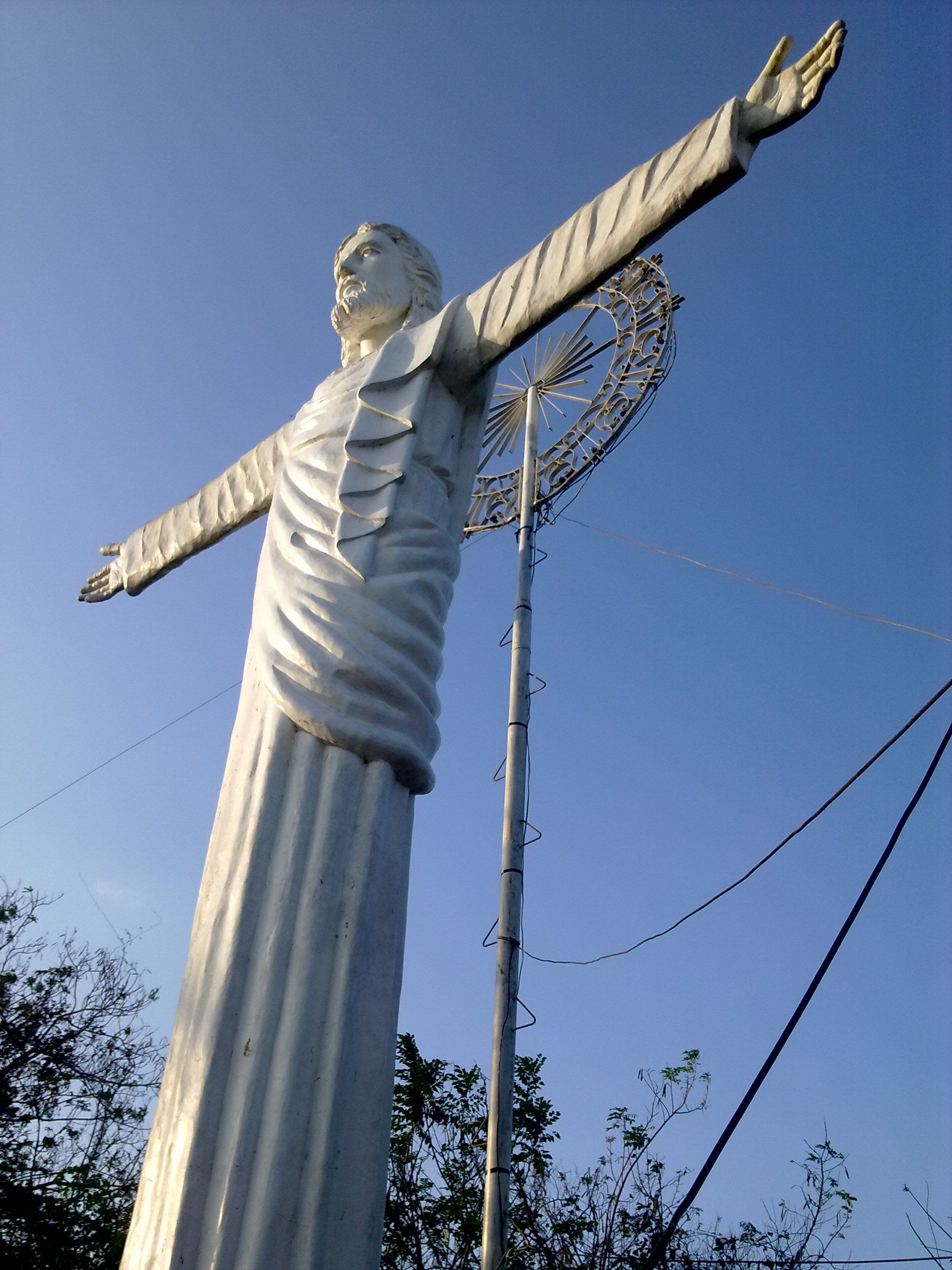
- From top, left to right: Main intersection and Gualberto Avenue in downtown Rosario, "I Love Rosario" at Laurel Park, Rosario Cultural and Sports Center, the Grotto, Tombol Hill, the Risen Christ monument, and the Rosario skyline viewed from Tombol Hill.

- Seal
- Nicknames: Rice Granary of Batangas, Agro-Industrial Capital of Southern Tagalog; Home of Sinukmani Festival
- Anthem: Himno ng Rosario
- Map of Batangas with Rosario highlighted
- Interactive map of Rosario
- Location within the Philippines
- Coordinates: 13°50′46″N 121°12′22″E
- Country: Philippines
- Region: Calabarzon
- Province: Batangas
- District: 4th district
- Founded: June 9, 1687
- Named for: Our Lady of the Rosary
- Barangays: 48 (see Barangays)

Government
  - Type: Sangguniang Bayan
  - Mayor: Leovigildo K. Morpe
  - Vice Mayor: Atanacio G. Zara
  - Representative: Amado Carlos A. Bolilia IV
  - Municipal Council: Members: Jose M. Galicha; Edward B. Aguilar; Darius M. Aguado; Joaz Martin I. De Veyra; Marciano S. Aquino; Dennis M. Hernandez; Teodoro Karr D. Luansing; Albino M. Altura
  - Electorate: 85,045 voters (2025)

Area
  - Total: 226.88 km^{2} (87.60 sq mi)
- Elevation: 148 m (486 ft)
- Highest elevation: 232 m (761 ft)
- Lowest elevation: 100 m (330 ft)

Population (2024 census)
  - Total: 131,365
  - Density: 579.01/km^{2} (1,499.6/sq mi)
  - Households: 30,029

Economy
  - Income class: 1st municipal income class
  - Poverty incidence: 9.25% (2023)
  - Revenue: ₱ 571.1 million (2024)
  - Assets: ₱ 1,337 million (2024)
  - Expenditure: ₱ 314 million (2024)
  - Liabilities: ₱ 161.5 million (2024)

Service provider
  - Electricity: Batangas 2 Electric Cooperative (BATELEC 2)
  - Water: Rosario Water District; PrimeWater
  - Telecommunications: Globe; PLDT
- Time zone: UTC+8 (PST)
- ZIP code: 4225
- PSGC: 0401021000
- IDD : area code: +63 (0)43
- Native languages: Ayta Kadi; Tagalog
- Website: www.rosariobatangas.ph

Rosario, officially the Municipality of Rosario (Tagalog: Bayan ng Rosario), is a municipality in the province of Batangas, Philippines. According to the 2024 census, it has a population of 131,365 people.

The municipality is considered as among the interior municipalities of the Batangas Bay region, comprising eleven municipalities and two cities whose catchment areas drain into Batangas Bay. It is also dubbed as "The Rice Granary of Batangas".

== History ==
This town of Rosario was founded by Augustinian friars in 1687. Don Nicolás Morales served as its first gobernadorcillo. It originated from the community of the early Christians on the southeastern coast of Batangas, in the vicinity of present-day Lobo.

The Moro pirate raids forced the inhabitants of the settlement to the safety of the ravine and forest on the north-west bank of Kansahayan River in Hilerang Kawayan (now a barangay in neighbouring Taysan called Pinagbayanan, meaning "once a settlement"). The settlement was relocated and renamed Rosario. At the height of the Moro Wars in latter 18th century, vicious raiders reached Hilerang Kawayan, killing among others the parish priest.

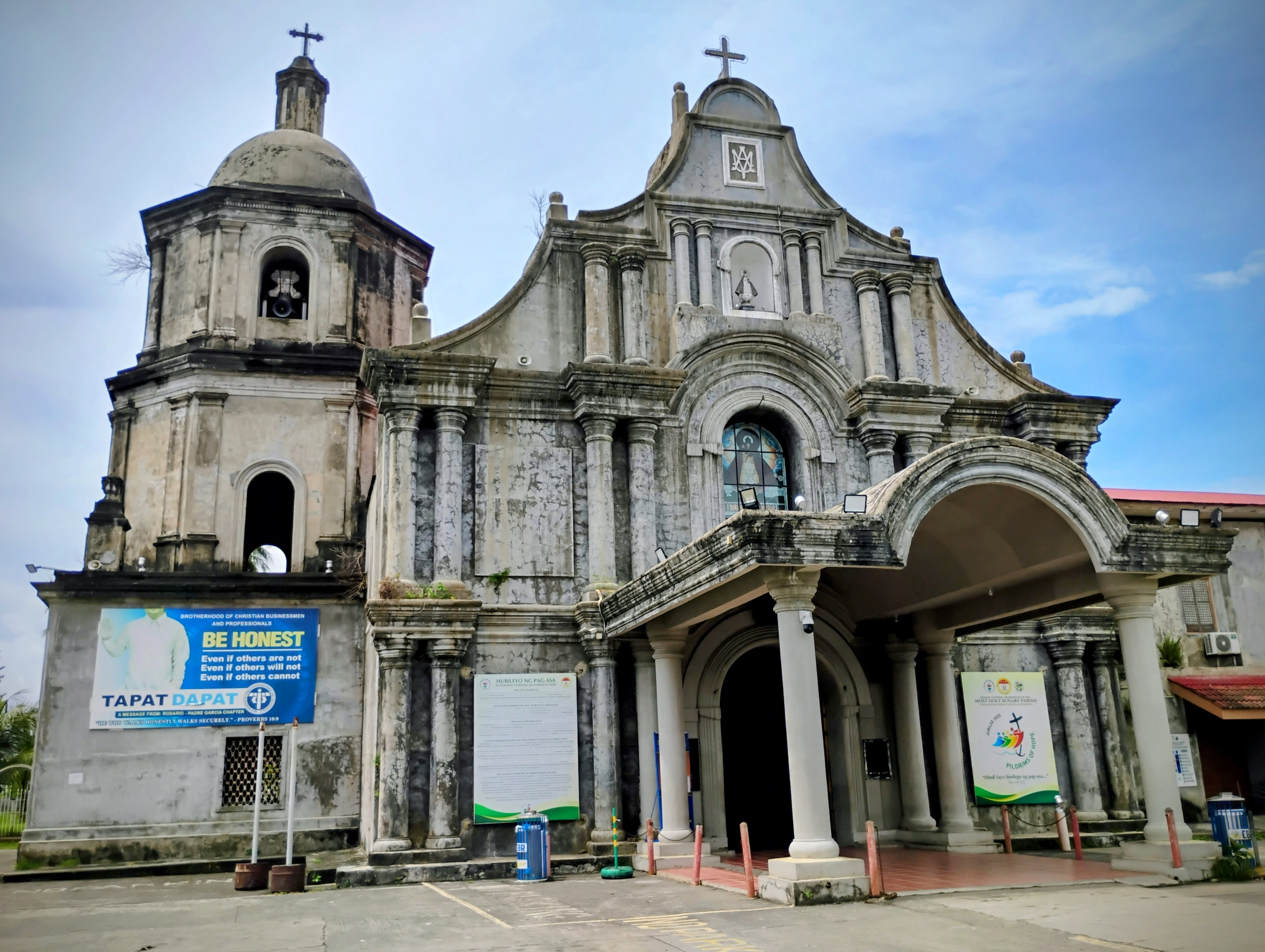
Most Holy Rosary Parish Church, first stone church of Rosario situated in Lumang Bayan; the present-day Padre Garcia

This town was further moved by the Dominican priests and headed farther north holding a novena and praying the rosary in the process of their flight. On the ninth and final night of the novena, the fleeing inhabitants reached the river bank of Tubig ng Bayan (lit. 'Water of Town', referring to a river originating from Lipa). Here they finally settled, building a stone church south of the riverbank in honor of their patroness, Our Lady of the Most Holy Rosary, and renamed after her as Santo Rosario. Rosario remained at the site until 1902.

The 1818 Spanish census recorded 1,758 native families living with four Spanish-Filipino families.

Santo Rosario was razed to the ground during the Philippine–American War. During the early American military occupation, a cavalry officer, Captain Daniel H. Boughton, came upon the big spring at the foot of Tombol Hill. He decided to relocate the town west of the spring, where Rosario's population center is now.

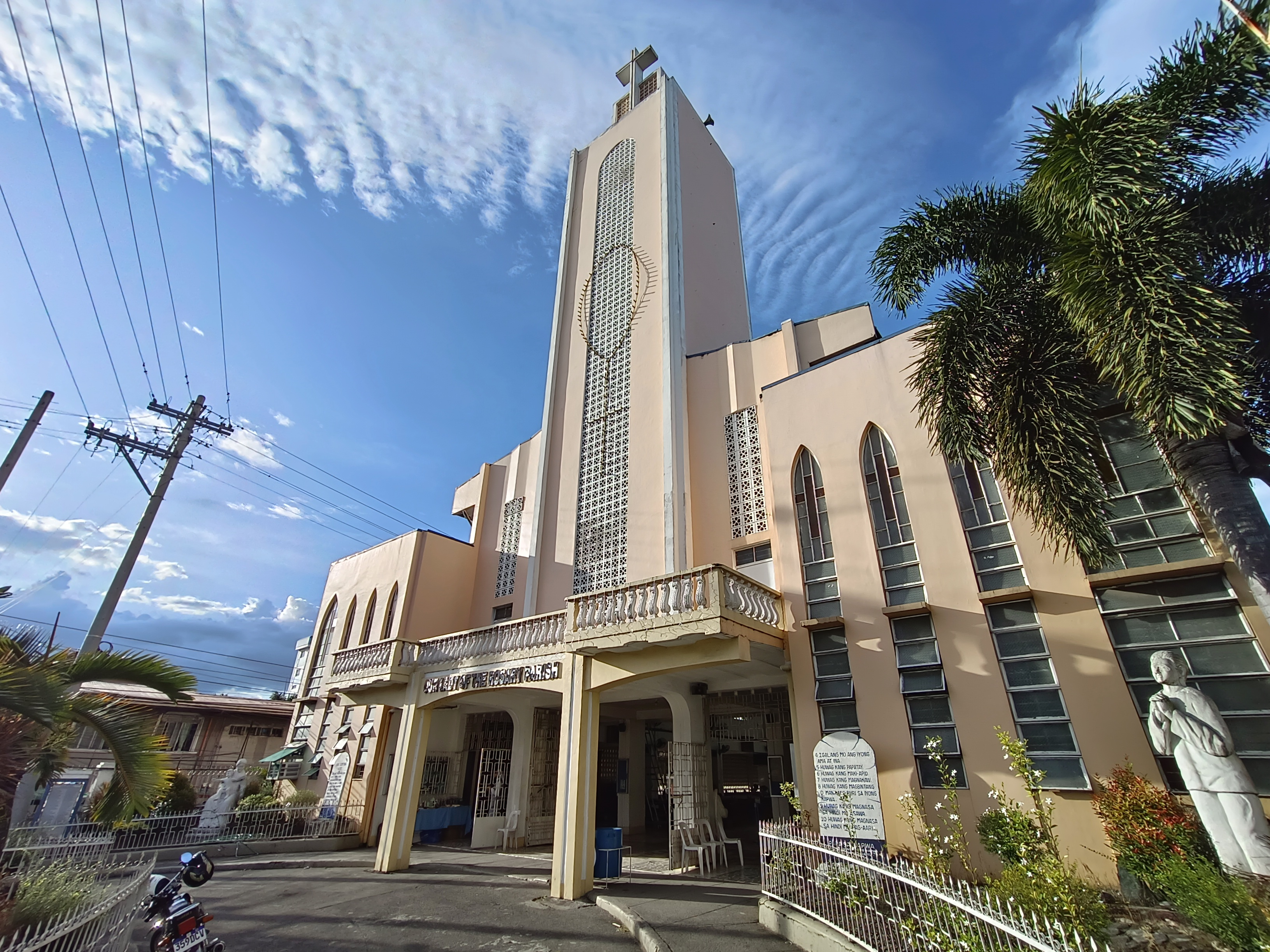
Our Lady of the Rosary Parish Church, focus of the present town

Official records show that on June 9, 1902, a council of prominent townsfolk met under a mango tree beside Tombol Spring to formally organise the municipal government. The following assumed the first key positions of the town government:

- Gerónimo Carandang (Presidente)
- Diego Rosales (Bise Presidente)
- Luis Greñas (Secretario)
- León Magtibay (Tesorero)

A wealthy landowner, Don Antonino Luancing donated for the town's public buildings and plaza. Tubig ng Bayan was renamed Lumang Bayan (lit. 'Old Town') until it became the municipal seat of Padre García in 1949.

Local historians disagree on the exact founding date of the town. Certainly, it was among those organized by ecclesiastical authorities after the creation of Batangas as a province in 1581. In the last years of Spanish rule, Recollect priests made Rosario the center of civilisation for its part of Batangas. It was then comprised the entirety of Lobo (separated on September 27, 1871,) Taysan (formerly Barrio Mercedes separated in 1919,) San Juan de Bocboc (formerly Barrio Bolboc, separated on December 12, 1848,) and Padre García.

It was in this town where General Miguel Malvar agreed to make peace with General J. Franklin Bell of the American forces on April 16, 1902, marking the end of the Philippine–American War.

== Geography ==
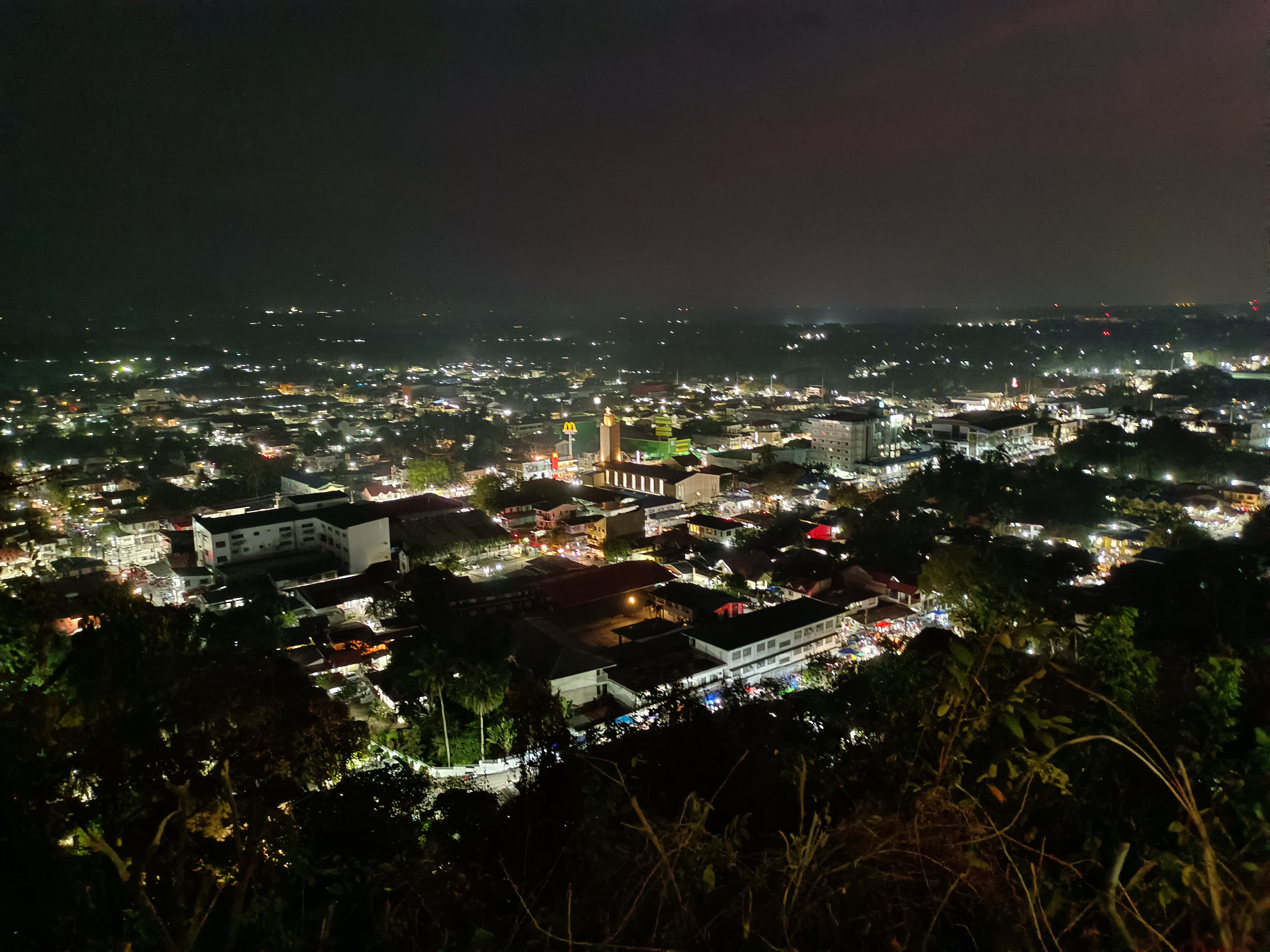
Downtown Rosario at night

Rosario is located at 13°50′46″N 121°12′22″E. It is 23 kilometres (14 mi) from Batangas City and 128 kilometres (80 mi) from Manila.

According to the Philippine Statistics Authority, the municipality has a land area of 226.88 square kilometres (87.60 sq mi) constituting 7.27% of the 3,119.75-square-kilometre- (1,204.54 sq mi) total area of Batangas.

=== Climate ===
Climate data for Rosario, Batangas
Month	Jan	Feb	Mar	Apr	May	Jun	Jul	Aug	Sep	Oct	Nov	Dec	Year
Mean daily maximum °C (°F)	26 (79)	27 (81)	29 (84)	31 (88)	31 (88)	30 (86)	28 (82)	28 (82)	28 (82)	28 (82)	27 (81)	26 (79)	28 (83)
Mean daily minimum °C (°F)	20 (68)	20 (68)	20 (68)	21 (70)	23 (73)	23 (73)	23 (73)	23 (73)	23 (73)	22 (72)	21 (70)	21 (70)	22 (71)
Average precipitation mm (inches)	52 (2.0)	35 (1.4)	27 (1.1)	27 (1.1)	82 (3.2)	124 (4.9)	163 (6.4)	144 (5.7)	145 (5.7)	141 (5.6)	100 (3.9)	102 (4.0)	1,142 (45)
Average rainy days	12.0	8.1	8.8	9.7	17.9	22.6	26.2	24.5	24.6	22.0	16.7	14.9	208
Source: Meteoblue

=== Barangays ===
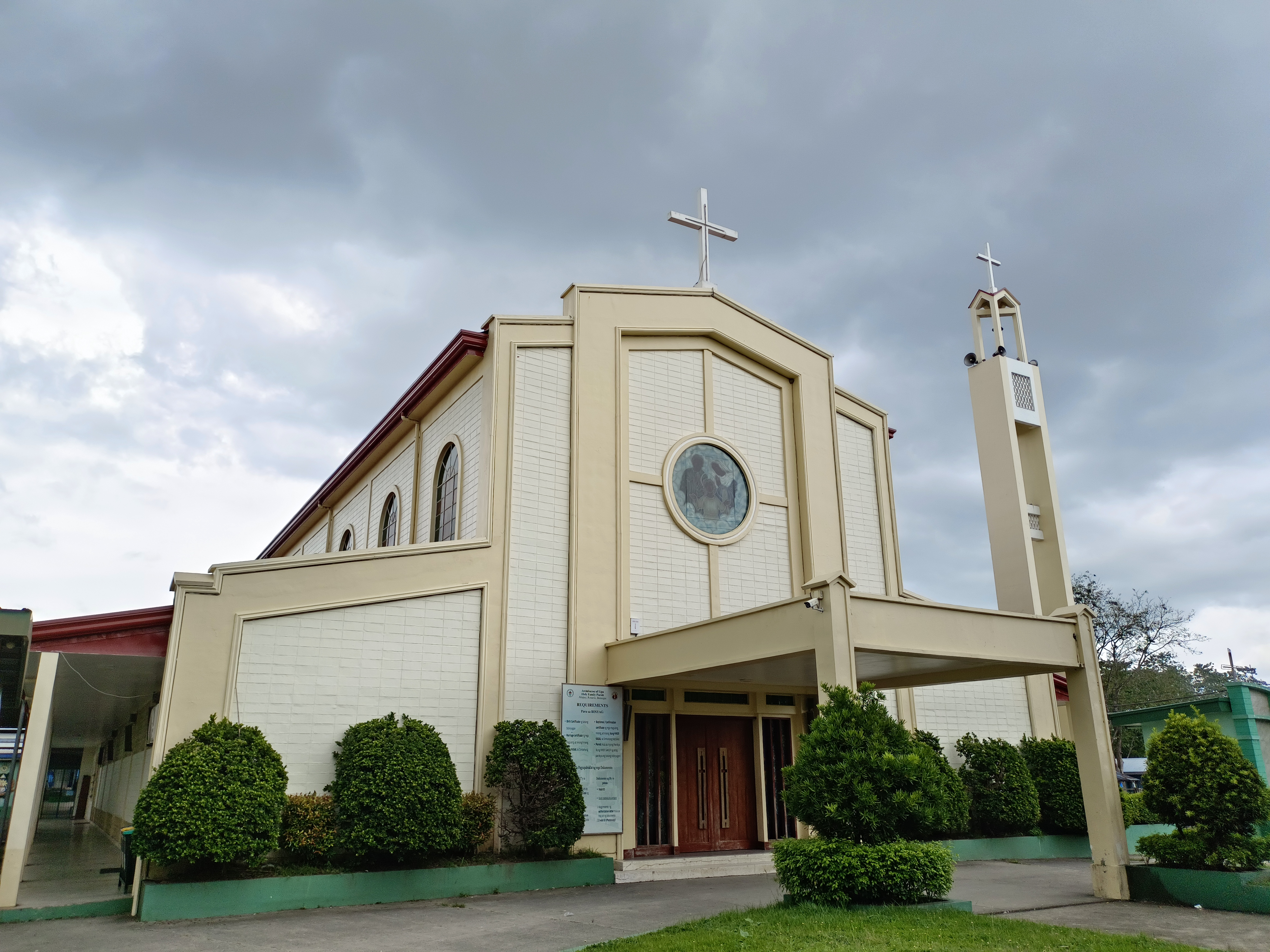
Holy Family Parish Church in Barangay Alupay

Rosario is politically subdivided into 48 barangays, as shown in the matrix below. Each barangay consists of puroks and some have sitios.

Malaya was formerly known as Munting Tubig.

PSGC	Barangay	Population			±% p.a.	
		2024		2010		
041021001	Alupay	3.3%	4,314	3,991	▴	0.54%
041021002	Antipolo	0.5%	674	652	▴	0.23%
041021003	Bagong Pook	4.4%	5,757	5,165	▴	0.75%
041021004	Balibago	1.7%	2,280	2,147	▴	0.42%
041021005	Bayawang	1.0%	1,307	1,332	▾	−0.13%
041021006	Baybayin	1.8%	2,323	2,288	▴	0.10%
041021007	Bulihan	3.1%	4,014	3,253	▴	1.46%
041021008	Cahigam	1.9%	2,450	1,907	▴	1.74%
041021009	Calantas	1.2%	1,634	1,560	▴	0.32%
041021010	Colongan	1.3%	1,727	1,655	▴	0.29%
041021011	Itlugan	3.6%	4,677	4,386	▴	0.44%
041021012	Lumbangan	1.2%	1,587	1,200	▴	1.95%
041021013	Maalas‑As	1.5%	1,932	1,776	▴	0.58%
041021014	Mabato	1.4%	1,794	1,660	▴	0.54%
041021015	Mabunga	1.4%	1,838	1,713	▴	0.49%
041021016	Macalamcam A	0.7%	959	1,058	▾	−0.68%
041021017	Macalamcam B	1.3%	1,765	1,480	▴	1.22%
041021018	Malaya	1.2%	1,555	1,482	▴	0.33%
041021019	Maligaya	0.7%	913	790	▴	1.00%
041021020	Marilag	2.2%	2,898	2,525	▴	0.95%
041021021	Masaya	3.0%	3,967	3,217	▴	1.46%
041021022	Matamis	0.5%	592	689	▾	−1.04%
041021023	Mavalor	1.2%	1,549	1,481	▴	0.31%
041021024	Mayuro	1.8%	2,411	2,068	▴	1.06%
041021025	Namuco	3.8%	4,992	4,314	▴	1.01%
041021026	Namunga	4.0%	5,276	4,785	▴	0.68%
041021027	Natu	2.1%	2,721	2,392	▴	0.89%
041021028	Nasi	1.6%	2,048	1,925	▴	0.43%
041021029	Palakpak	0.6%	851	852	▾	−0.01%
041021030	Pinagsibaan	2.6%	3,422	2,999	▴	0.91%
041021031	Barangay A (Poblacion)	0.9%	1,122	1,082	▴	0.25%
041021032	Barangay B (Poblacion)	1.0%	1,376	1,195	▴	0.98%
041021033	Barangay C (Poblacion)	0.7%	943	968	▾	−0.18%
041021034	Barangay D (Poblacion)	0.7%	932	1,039	▾	−0.75%
041021035	Barangay E (Poblacion)	1.7%	2,276	2,174	▴	0.32%
041021036	Putingkahoy	2.1%	2,811	2,612	▴	0.51%
041021037	Quilib	3.1%	4,041	3,157	▴	1.72%
041021038	Salao	1.8%	2,303	2,121	▴	0.57%
041021039	San Carlos	2.9%	3,771	3,345	▴	0.83%
041021040	San Ignacio	1.5%	1,954	1,780	▴	0.65%
041021041	San Isidro	2.9%	3,811	3,521	▴	0.55%
041021042	San Jose	1.6%	2,075	1,874	▴	0.71%
041021043	San Roque	3.0%	3,900	3,648	▴	0.46%
041021044	Santa Cruz	2.5%	3,301	3,055	▴	0.54%
041021045	Timbugan	1.6%	2,077	1,946	▴	0.45%
041021046	Tiquiwan	1.3%	1,736	1,654	▴	0.33%
041021047	Leviste (Tubahan)	1.3%	1,753	1,656	▴	0.39%
041021048	Tulos	1.8%	2,355	1,992	▴	1.16%
	Total		131,365	105,561	▴	1.52%

== Demographics ==
Population census of Rosario
Year	Pop.	±% p.a.
1903	8,326	—
1918	22,174	+6.75%
1939	34,130	+2.07%
1948	36,020	+0.60%
1960	32,868	−0.76%
1970	42,704	+2.65%
1975	47,298	+2.07%
1980	54,252	+2.78%
1990	66,923	+2.12%
1995	74,976	+2.15%
2000	86,110	+3.01%
2007	95,785	+1.48%
2010	105,561	+3.60%
2015	116,764	+1.94%
2020	128,352	+2.01%
2024	131,365	+0.56%
Source: Philippine Statistics Authority

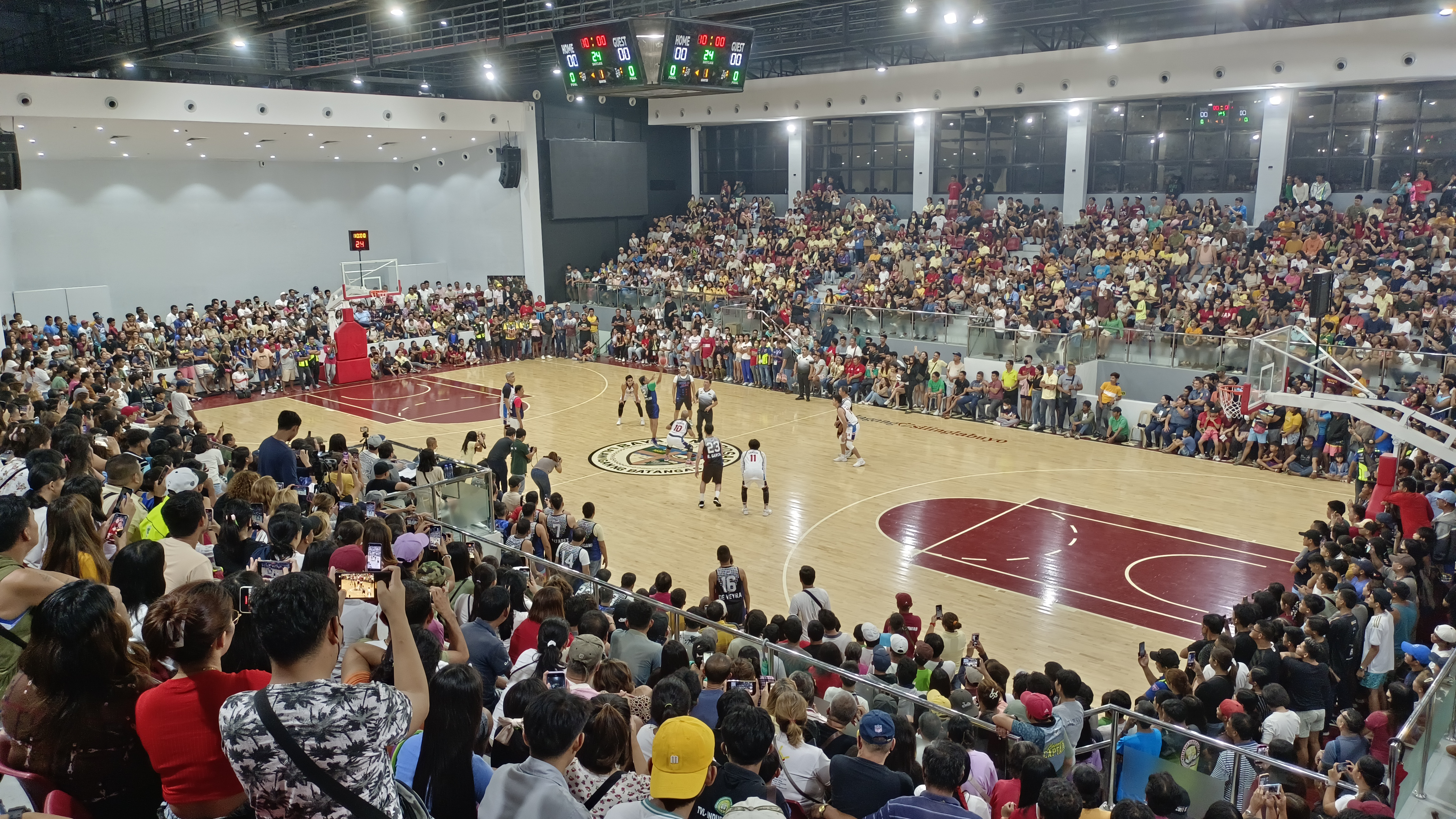
Rosario Cultural and Sports Center hosts basketball games, public entertainment, and events

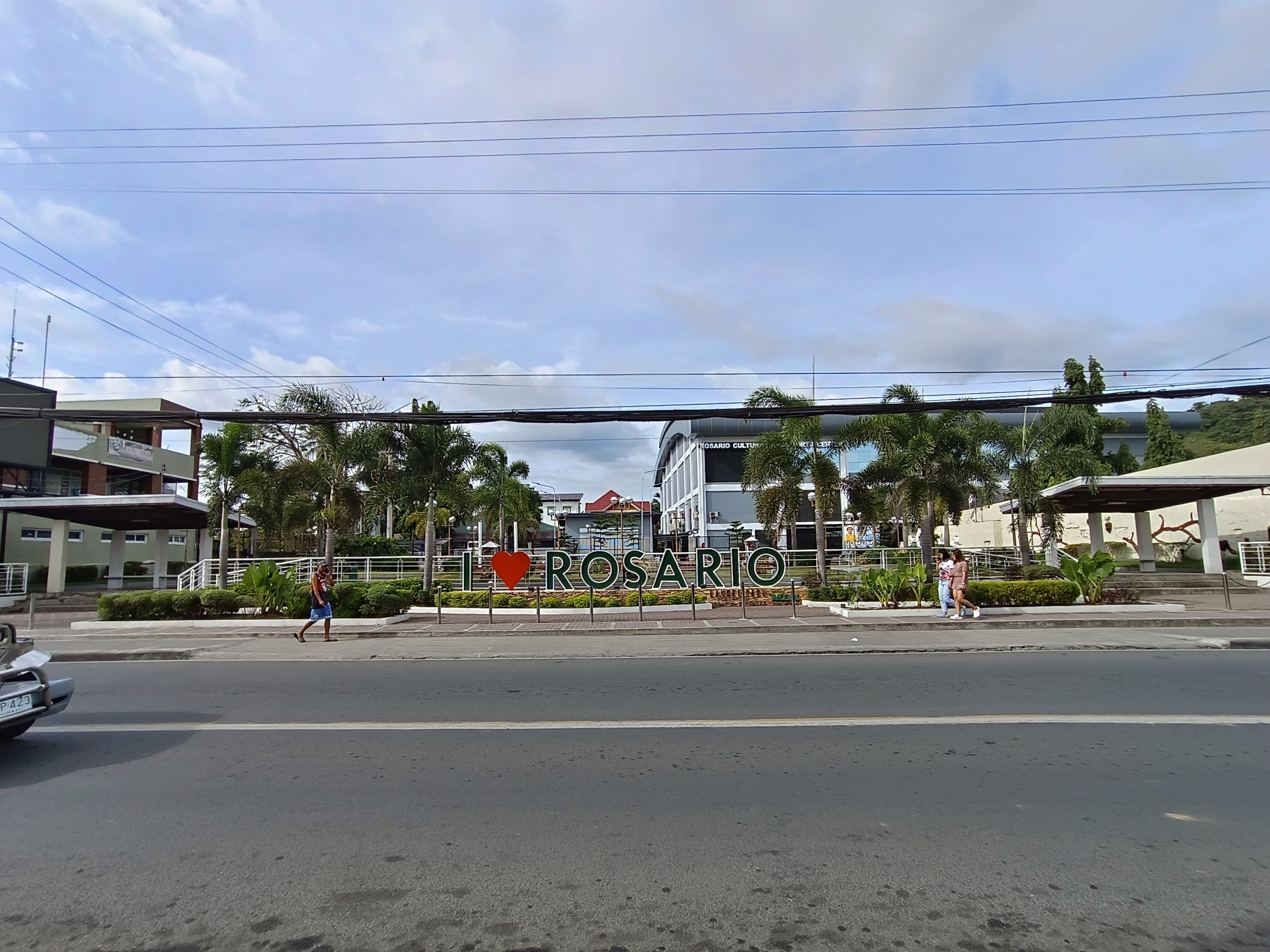
Laurel Park, a public park in downtown Rosario

In the 2024 census, Rosario had a population of 131,365 people. The population density was 580 inhabitants per square kilometre (1,500/sq mi).

=== Language ===
Tagalog is the dominant language in Rosario and use code-switching in Taglish being the common way of speaking of the Filipinos. Like anywhere in Batangas, and some parts of nearby provinces, a dialect of the Tagalog language called Batangan or Batangueño is the primary casual vernacular language. English is used as the language of business and education. This is similar to Spanish, once widely spoken and also used as the primary formal medium of instruction in schools during the colonial era.

=== Religion ===
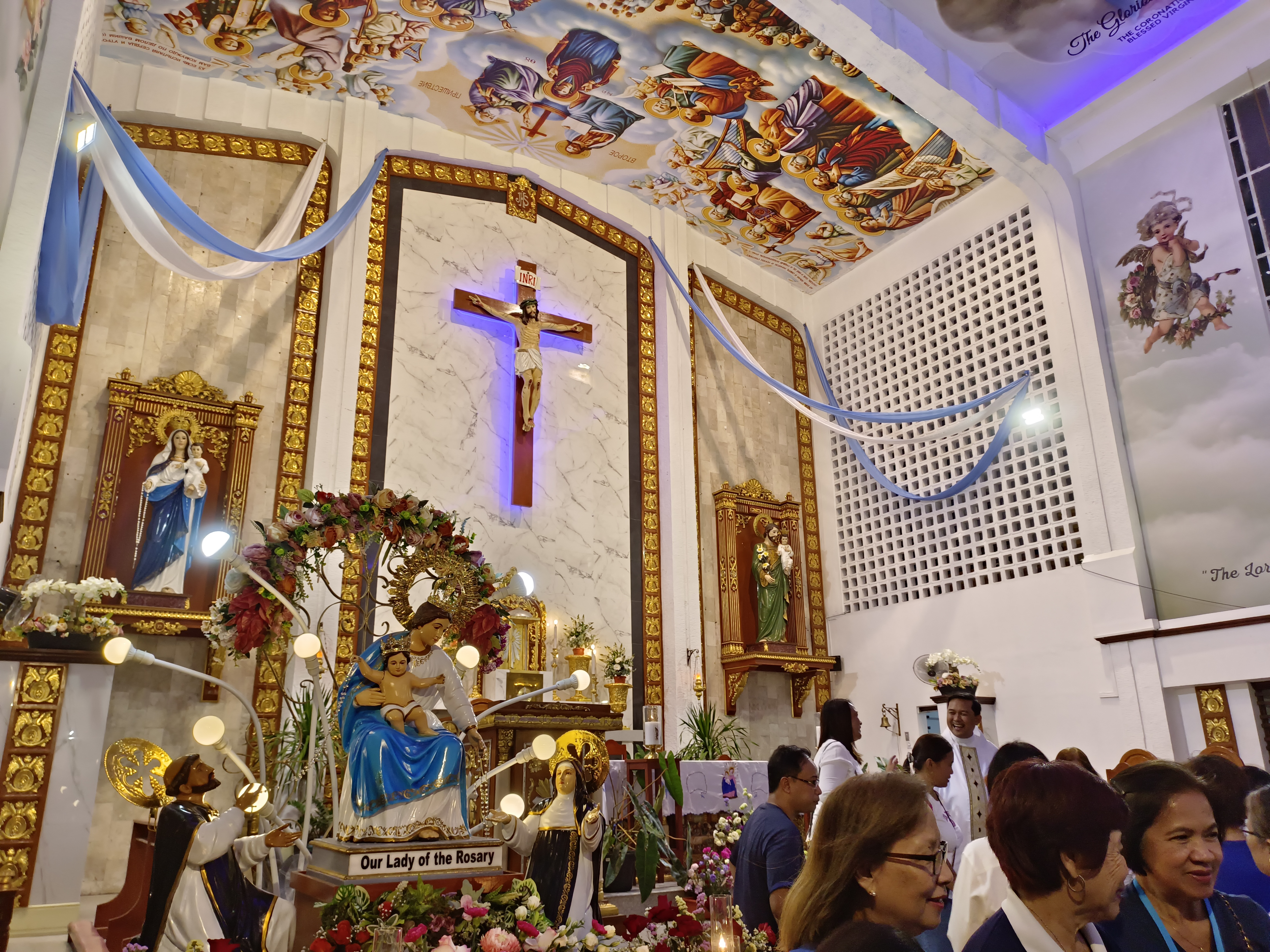
At the sanctuary of the church stands the image of Our Lady of the Rosary, the town's patron saint

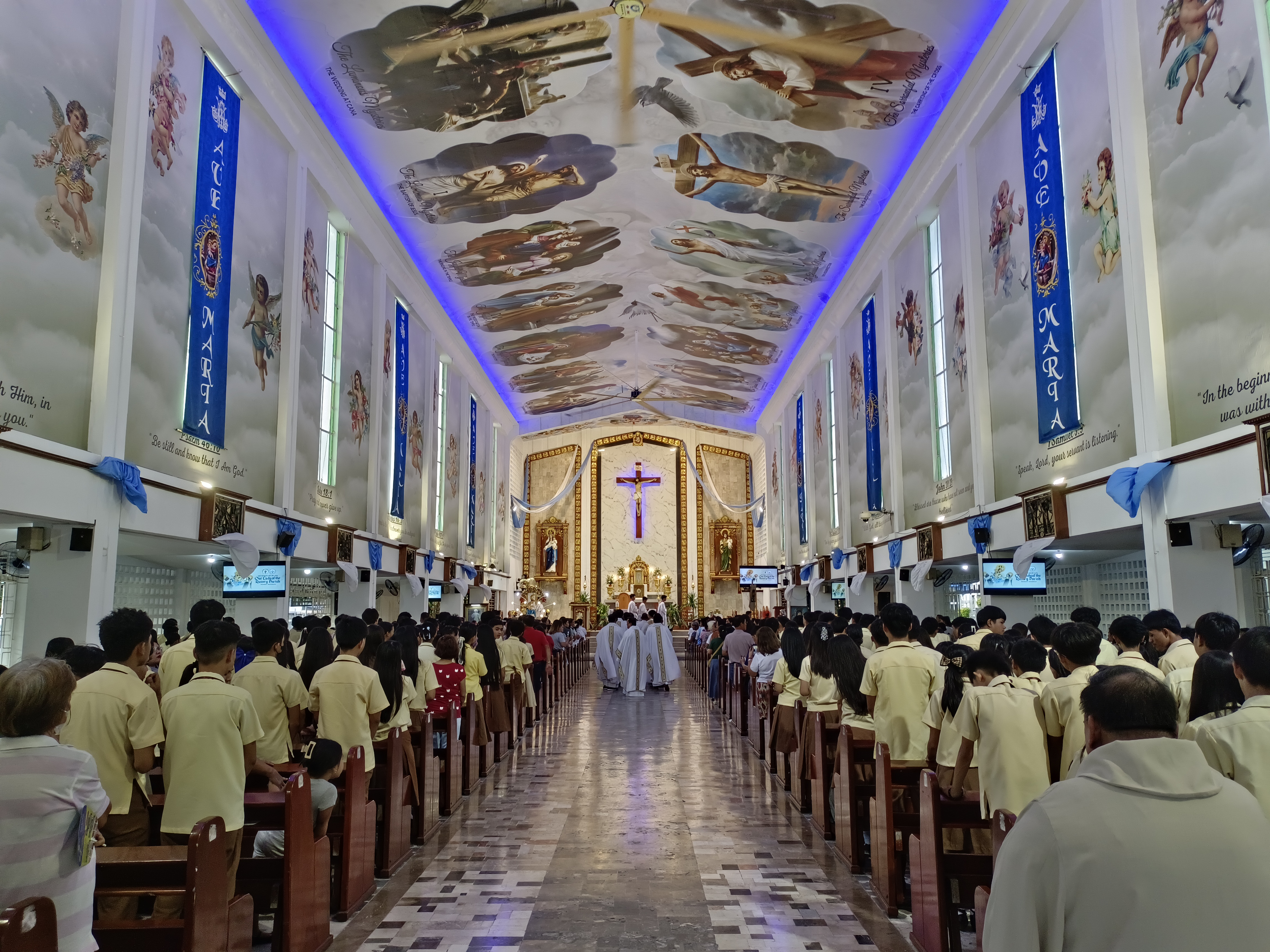
The Our Lady of the Rosary Parish church’ nave.

Roman Catholic, Rosario has two parishes: the Our Lady of the Rosary Parish and Holy Family Parish run by Oblates of Saint Joseph under the Archdiocese of Lipa.

Iglesia Filipina Independiente (Aglipayan Church), on January 19, 1909, the first Aglipayan mass in Rosario was celebrated by Bishop Gregorio Aglipay himself.

Iglesia ni Cristo, with locales in barangays: Alupay, Bagong Pook Sitio Cupi, Bulihan, Colongan, Mabato, Malaya, Mayuro, Namunga, San Carlos, San Isidro, and San Roque.

Victory Rosario, the 126th Victory Church in the Philippines and 7th in Batangas, is located in Poblacion A.

Other Christian denominations include: Jesus the Anointed One, Jesus Miracle Crusade International Ministry, Jesus is Alive, Grace of Almighty God Community, Saved by Grace Ministries, United Church of Christ in the Philippines, Seventh-day Adventist Church, Jehovah's Witnesses, the Church of Jesus Christ of Latter-day Saints, Lutheran Church in the Philippines, Philippine Benevolent Missionaries Association, Baptists, and Iglesia Evangelica Metodista en las Islas Filipinas.

6% of the population consists of other religious affiliations including Islam while the rest are all Roman Catholics.

=== Indigenous people ===
After the 1991 eruption of Mount Pinatubo, an Aeta Tribal Community was resettled in Barangay Puting Kahoy.

== Economy ==
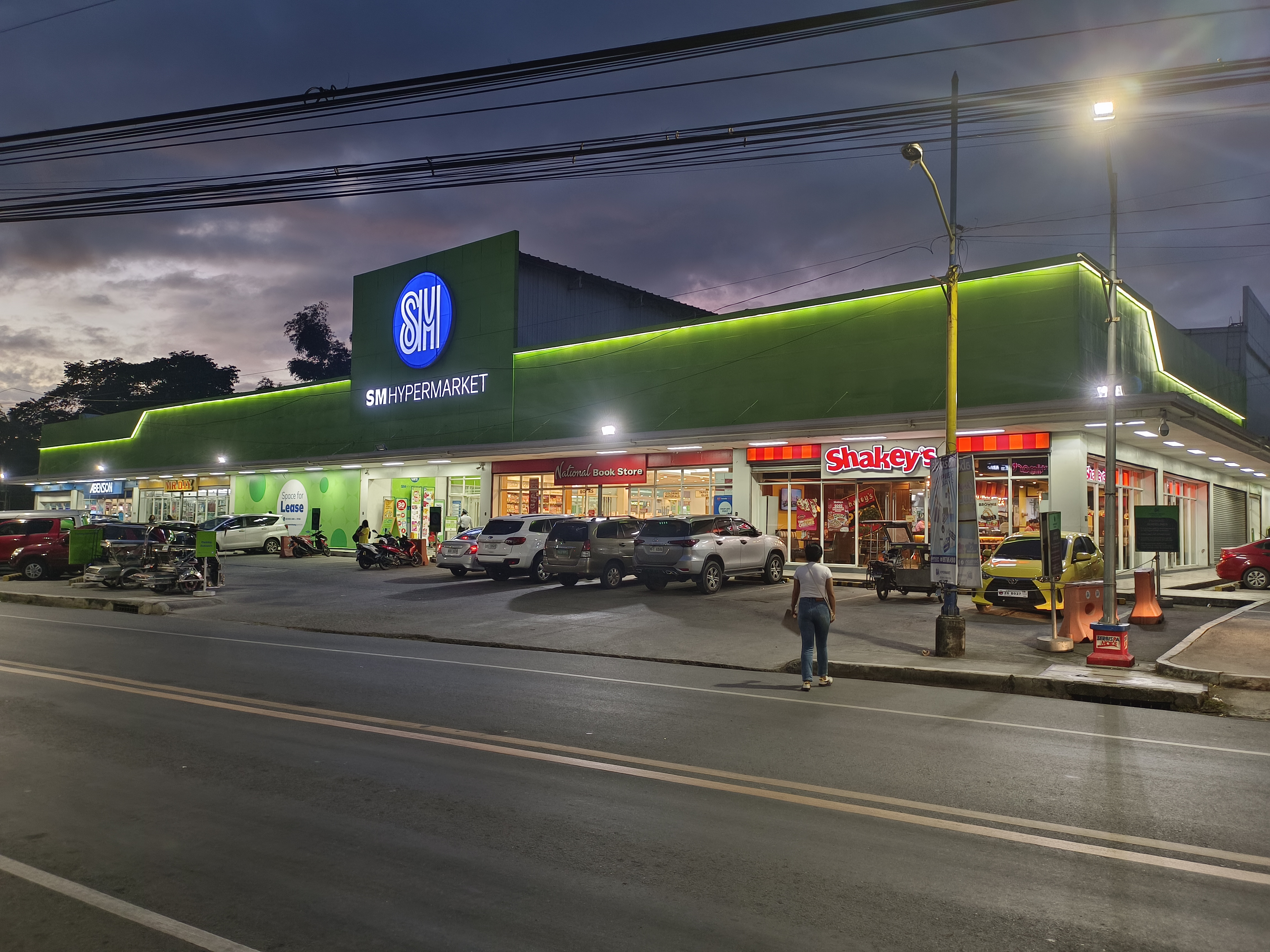
SM Hypermarket located in Barangay Namunga

Rosario Public Market

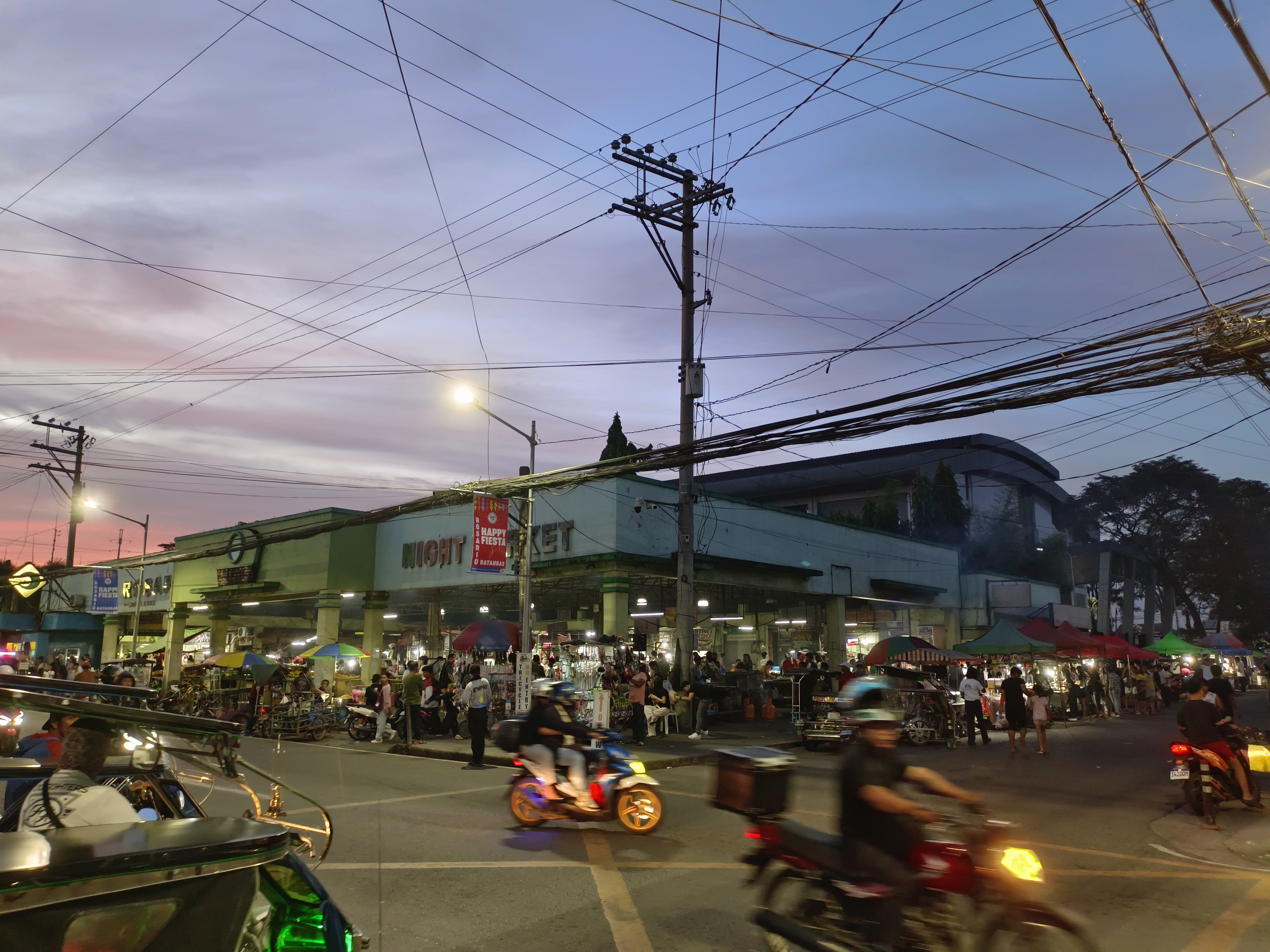
Rosario Night Market

Poverty incidence of Rosario (%)

Source: Philippine Statistics Authority

=== Agriculture ===
Rice is the major agricultural crop, naming Rosario the "Rice Granary of Batangas". Other crops include corn, coconut, mango, banana, and other fruits and vegetables. A significant number of households in Rosario actively participate in small-scale agricultural enterprises. These ventures encompass various activities, including backyard operations focused on livestock. Alongside these individual efforts, commercial livestock farms also play a role in the agricultural landscape of Rosario.

=== Commerce ===
Due to its strategic location, and the separation of Lipa to become a lone congressional district, Rosario has since become a center of commerce in the 4th district of Batangas. Rosario hosts some supermarket chains which compete with local mini-marts. High-end home improvement suppliers such as the Maquiling Builders Depot in Barangay Namunga and CitiHardware in Barangay San Jose are rising within the municipality. Fast food restaurants mostly prefer Rosario for their first store within the 4th district along with Seattle's Best's first drive thru in the Philippines, found in Barangay Namunga.

=== Industries ===
Industrial establishments in the municipality are mostly agri-based, while the Puyat Steel Corporation is an ISO 9002-certified galvanizing plant manufacturing world-class iron sheets. International Pipe Industries Corporation, also an ISO-certified, manufactures high quality spiral welded steel pipes and fittings with one of its facilities located in Barangay Masaya.

== Education ==
There are two schools district offices which govern all educational institutions within the municipality. They oversee the management and operations of all private and public, from primary to secondary schools. These are the Rosario East Schools District Office, and Rosario West Schools District Office.

=== Primary and elementary schools ===
The municipality is served by 45 public elementary schools under the supervision of the Department of Education, including Rosario East and Rosario West Central Schools.

=== Secondary schools ===
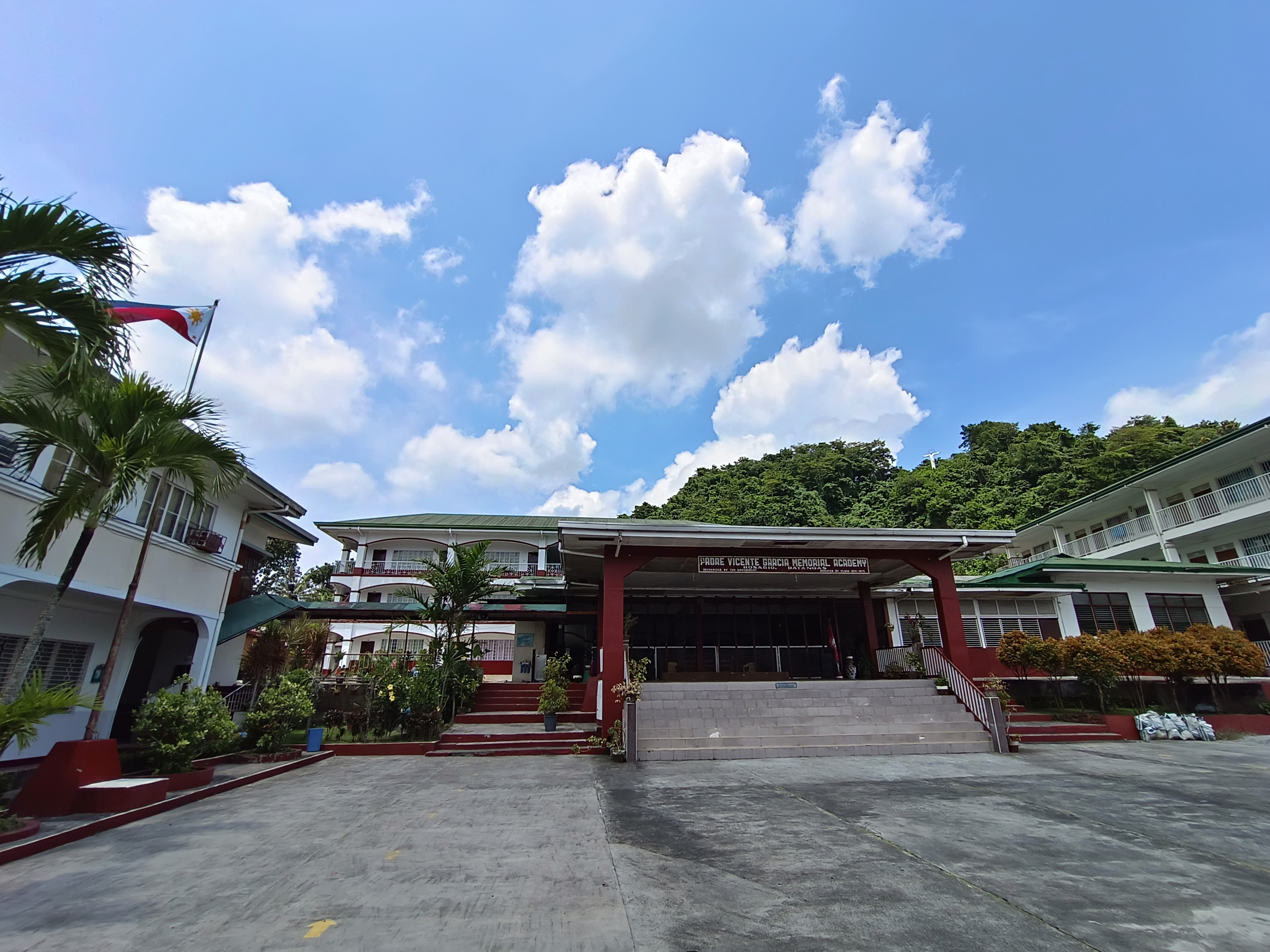
Padre Vicente Garcia Memorial Academy, PVGMA or The academy at the foot of Tombol Hill

The municipality is served by 13 public national high schools under the Department of Education, including the flagship **Rosario National High School and Rosario Technical High School. Other public secondary institutions include

- Alupay National High School
- Baybayin National High School
- Bulihan Integrated Senior High School
- Calantas National High School
- Itlugan National High School
- Macalamcam B National High School
- Mayuro National High School
- Palakpak Integrated National High School
- The Saint Isidore National High School
- Timbugan National High School
- Tulos National High School

Private secondary education is provided by several institutions, most notably the Padre Vicente Garcia Memorial Academy (PVGMA), established in 1946 as the town's first high school. Other private providers include the Santo Niño Formation and Science School, Rosario Advent High School, and Sunhill Montessori Casa, among others.

=== Higher educational institutions ===
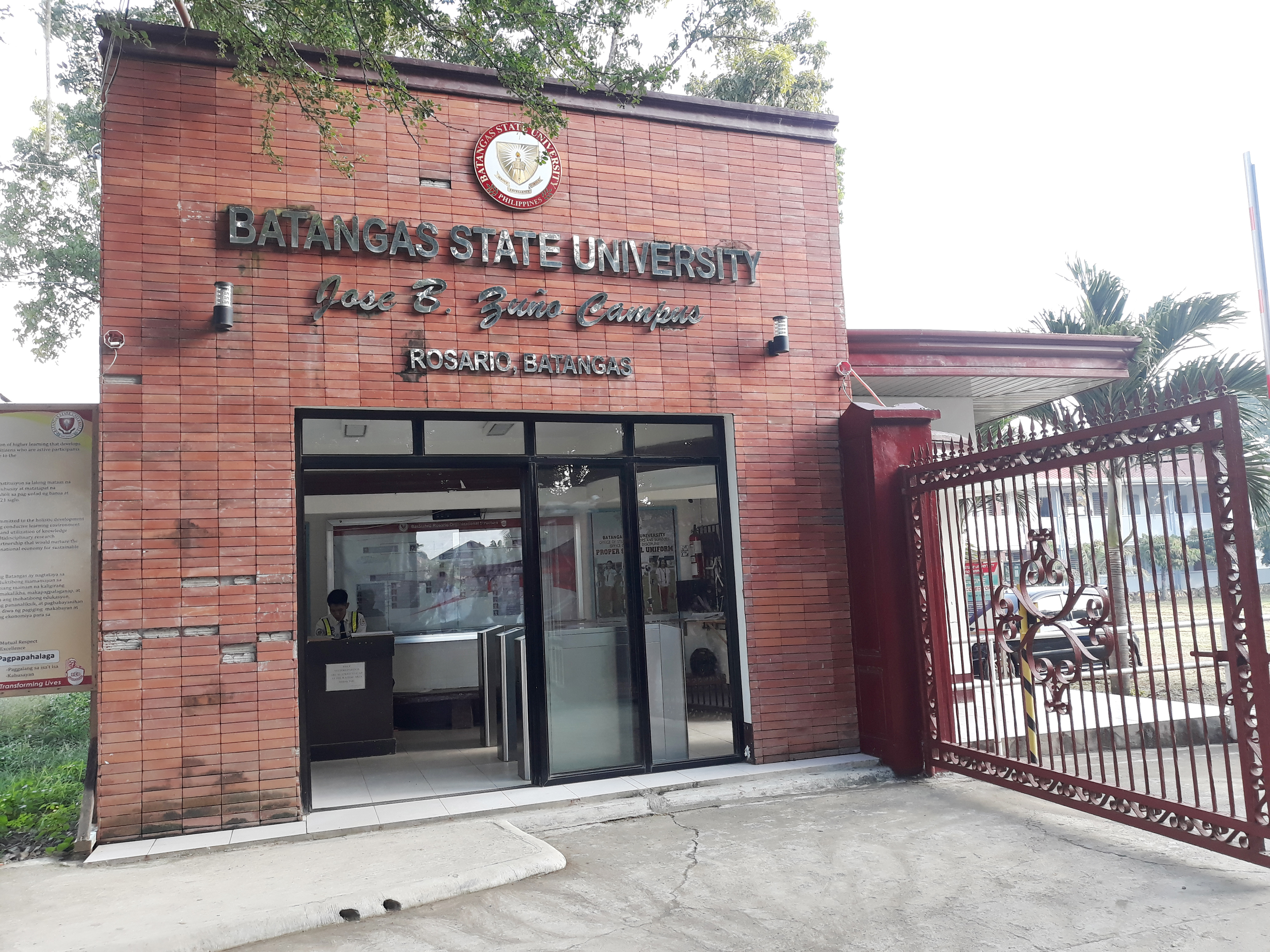
Batangas State University - Jose B. Zuño Campus in Barangay Namunga

- Batangas State University (Jose B. Zuño Campus): Located in Barangay Namunga, this extension campus of The National Engineering University houses the College of Teacher Education, College of Industrial Technology, and the College of Accountancy, Business, Economics, and International Hospitality Management. The campus sits on land donated by the Zuño family.
- Teodoro M. Luansing College of Rosario: A private non-sectarian college situated in Barangay Namunga. It offers various undergraduate programs including Business Administration and Teacher Education, as well as Senior High School strands.
- Saint Joseph College of Rosario Batangas: A Catholic institution managed by the Oblates of St. Joseph. It evolved from the parish school system and offers college courses alongside its basic education units.
- Santo Rosario Academy of Alupay Rosario Batangas: A Catholic institution managed by the Oblates of St. Joseph. It is a private educational institution located in Barangay Alupay, situated behind Parroquia de la Sagrada Familia. It offers basic education programs from Kindergarten to Senior High School.

- MKA College and Institute of Technology: A private technical and higher education institution operating within the municipality.

== Government ==
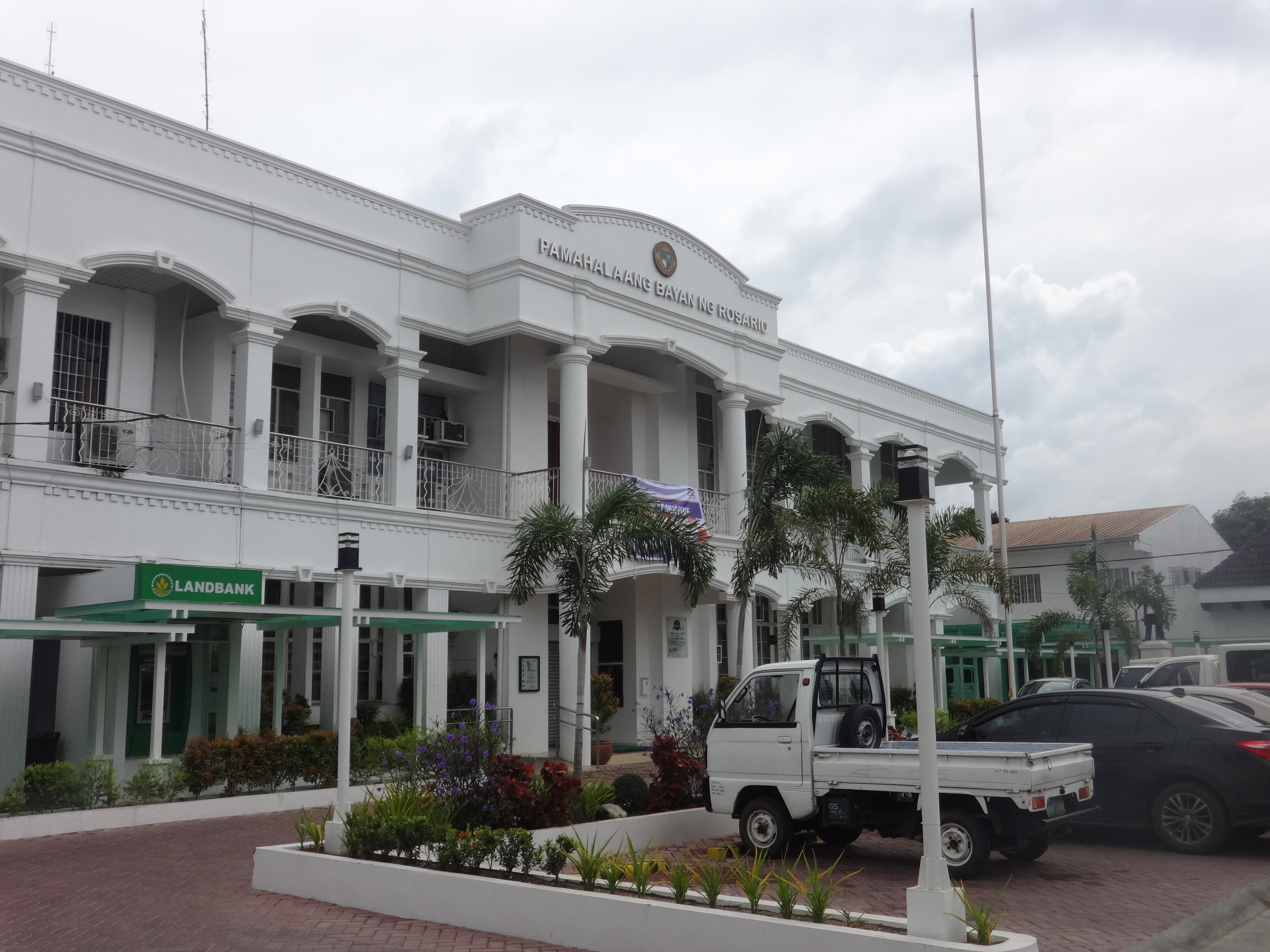
Municipal Hall

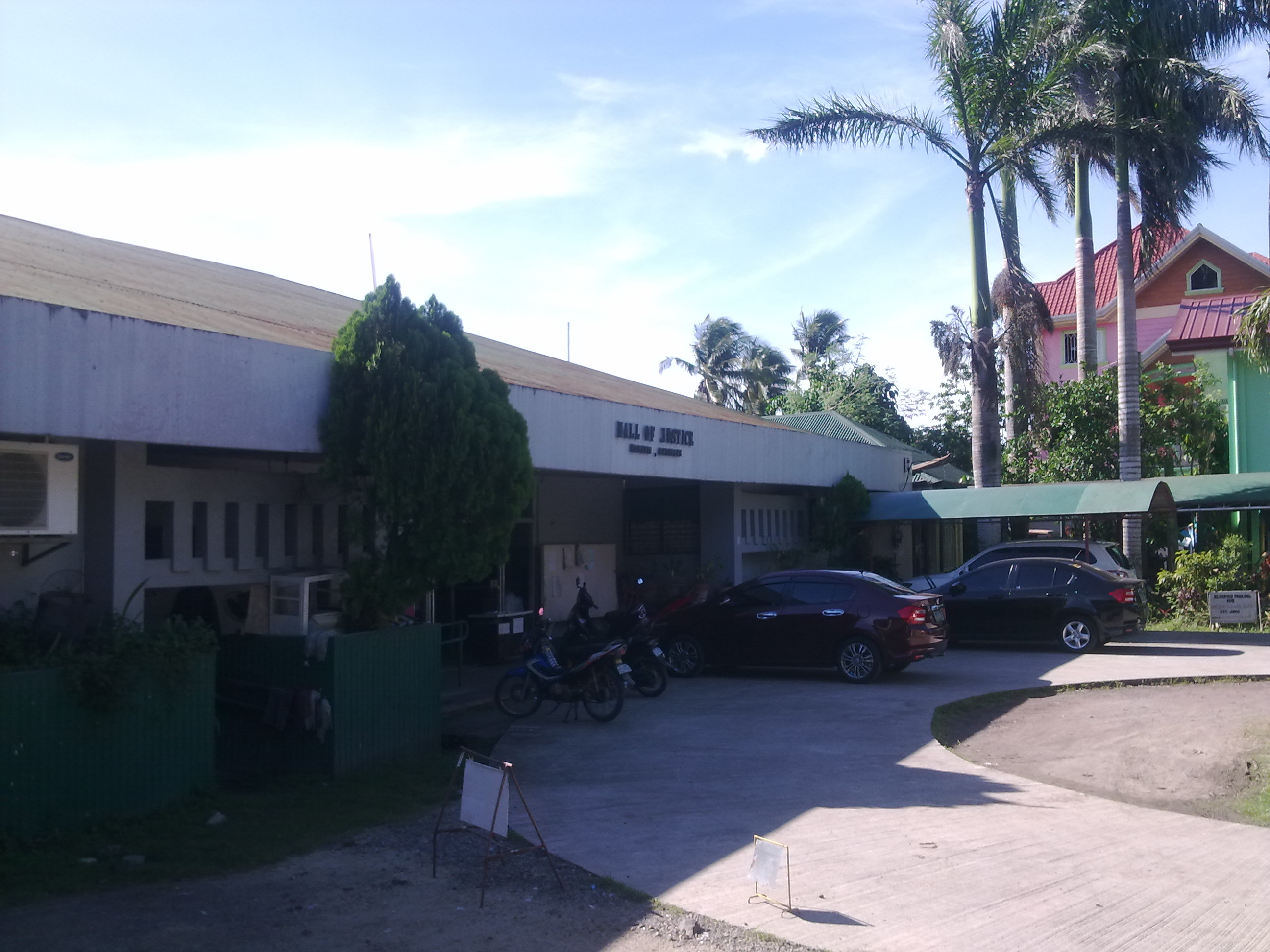
Hall of Justice

=== Elected officials ===
The current set of municipal officials were elected during the 2025 General Elections; their term is set to expire in 2028.

Municipal Government of Rosario (2025–2028)
Mayor
Leovigildo K. Morpe
Vice Mayor
Atanacio G. Zara
Sangguniang Bayan Members
Jose M. Galicha	Joaz Martin I. De Veyra
Edward B. Aguilar	Dennis M. Hernandez
Darius M. Aguado	Teodoro Karr C. Luansing
Marciano S. Aquino	Albino M. Altura
ABC President
Ruel H. Montales
SK Federation President
Al Leah I. Bolado

=== Judiciary ===
Rosario has a regional trial court (RTC) Branch 87 recognized by the Supreme Court of the Philippines. Creation of four additional RTC branches was approved by the Senate Committee and forwarded to the plenary.

=== Social Welfare ===
The Regional Haven for Women and Girls of DSWD Region IV-A is in Rosario.

== Transportation ==
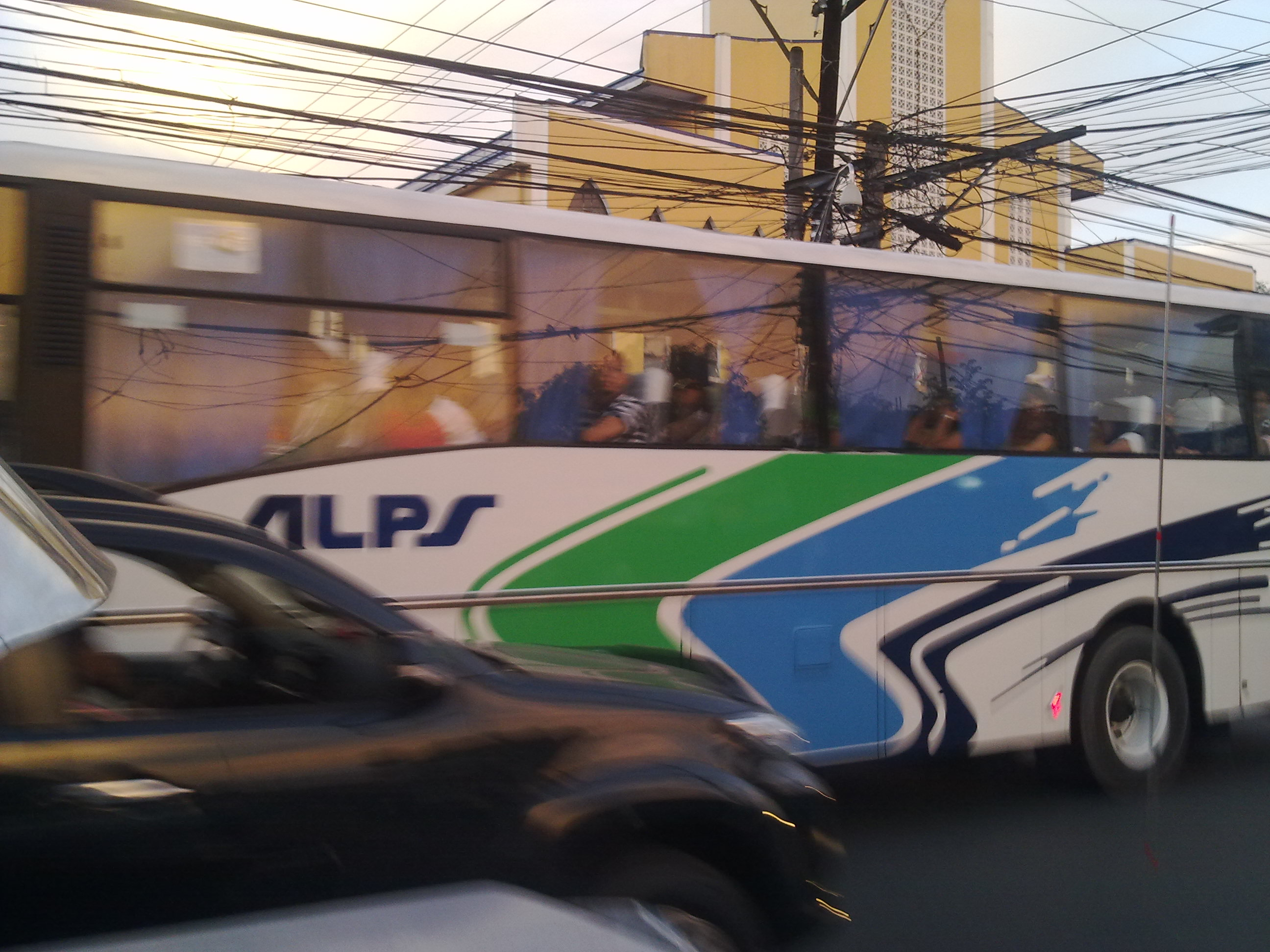
ALPS bus from San Juan terminal passing through Gualberto Avenue

=== Road networks ===
N435 is a national secondary road that passes the town proper. The Lipa-Rosario Road segment of N435 northward gives access to municipality of Padre Garcia, Lipa, and Metro Manila; while the Rosario-Ibaan Road segment of N435 westward gives access to Ibaan, Batangas City, and also Metro Manila via STAR Tollway. Intersecting eastward is Gualberto Avenue that gives access to San Juan, Lucena, and all the way to Bicol Region. Referred to as kalye mayor, it is the main thoroughfare within the poblacion and part of N422. Completing the intersection southward is G. Carandang Street giving access to the municipalities of Taysan and Lobo.

=== Public transport ===
There are jeepneys bound for Batangas City and Lipa on a regular basis. Jeepneys not from a terminal plying from Lipa to San Just also pass by Rosario via Gualberto Avenue. Buses from Batangas City to Lucena and buses from San Juan to Ayala Malls Manila Bay/LRT-Buendia/PITX, and Turbina/BGC/Cubao also pass by Gualberto Avenue. Like many other towns and cities in the Philippines, tricycles are common means of transportation within the municipality. Modern jeepneys bound for SM Lipa Grand Terminal also exist.

=== Sea and Air ===
Since it is a landlocked municipality, there are no seaports in Rosario. The nearest access through the sea is via the Batangas International Port which is around 27 km (17 mi) away. There are also no airports in Rosario. For domestic and international flights, people need to go to Ninoy Aquino International Airport which is around 99 km (62 mi) away.

== Utilities ==
=== Electricity ===
BATELEC II (Batangas II Electric Cooperative, Inc.) provides electric power to the locality. The Rosario branch is home to Batelec II Area II, which has jurisdiction over the towns of San Juan, Lobo, Taysan, and Padre Garcia.

=== Water ===
The Rosario Water District is a local government entity responsible for supplying and distributing water within the municipality. Hiraya Water Corporation, a private water service provider, partners with local water districts like Rosario to enhance water services through a public-private partnership model. In this partnership, the water district retains ultimate authority over water supply regulations and community needs, while Hiraya Water operates according to the district's guidelines and standards.

=== Telecommunications ===
Originally, Digitel was the sole telecommunications provider in Rosario until it was absorbed into PLDT. Currently, Rosario is served by Globe and PLDT.

== Culture ==
=== Cuisine ===
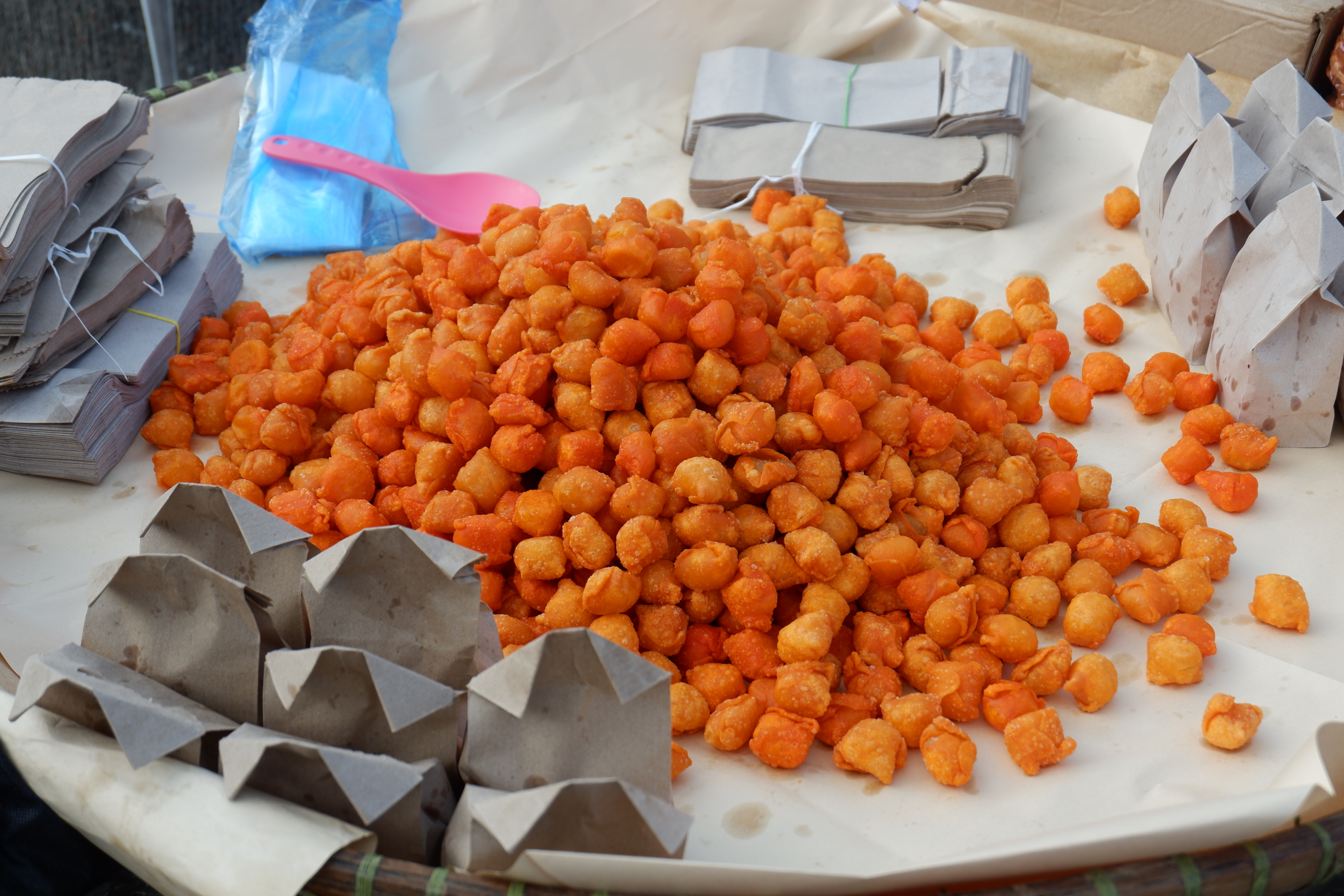
Buchi-buchi

Sinukmani aptly represents the town as its main ingredients: rice, coconut, and sugar are also the main products of Rosario; which is why Sinukmani Festival is celebrated annually during the founding anniversary of the municipality.

Kalamay is not just a popular snack in Rosario but also a vital part of traditional Batangas wedding or baysanan along with suman. Kalamay is usually offered on the latter part of baysanan called dapit. The sticky rice cake symbolizes strong attachment of the couple to each other and to each other's family. Suman on the other hand is given during the sabugan, a part of baysanan within the wedding reception. The ninongs and ninangs or the principal sponsors and even some relatives and friends are called to give cash gifts or sabog. In exchange, they receive suman in a manner that it is seemingly being sold to them. Principal sponsors get to receive a basket of goodies with the suman in it plus primal cuts of meat collectively called sabit.

=== Penitensyahan ===
Traditions observed during Holy Week in Rosario include pilgrimage to the Grotto and the ascent to Tombol Hill. Good Friday starts early in the morning with Penitensyahan, a notable procession in Rosario which includes higantes. A more traditional long procession is held at night that features images of Jesus, Mama Mary, and various saints. On Easter Sunday, Salubong and Pagbati is performed in front of the parish church. Pagbati in Rosario is traditionally composed of three young ladies dancing to the tune of a local brass band. They are dressed in white on the actual Easter Sunday dance early in the morning, and clad in a more colorful dress on the Black Saturday rehearsal dance held in the evening. It is accompanied by waving a flag with grace, making sure it would not fall or roll up.

== Tourism ==
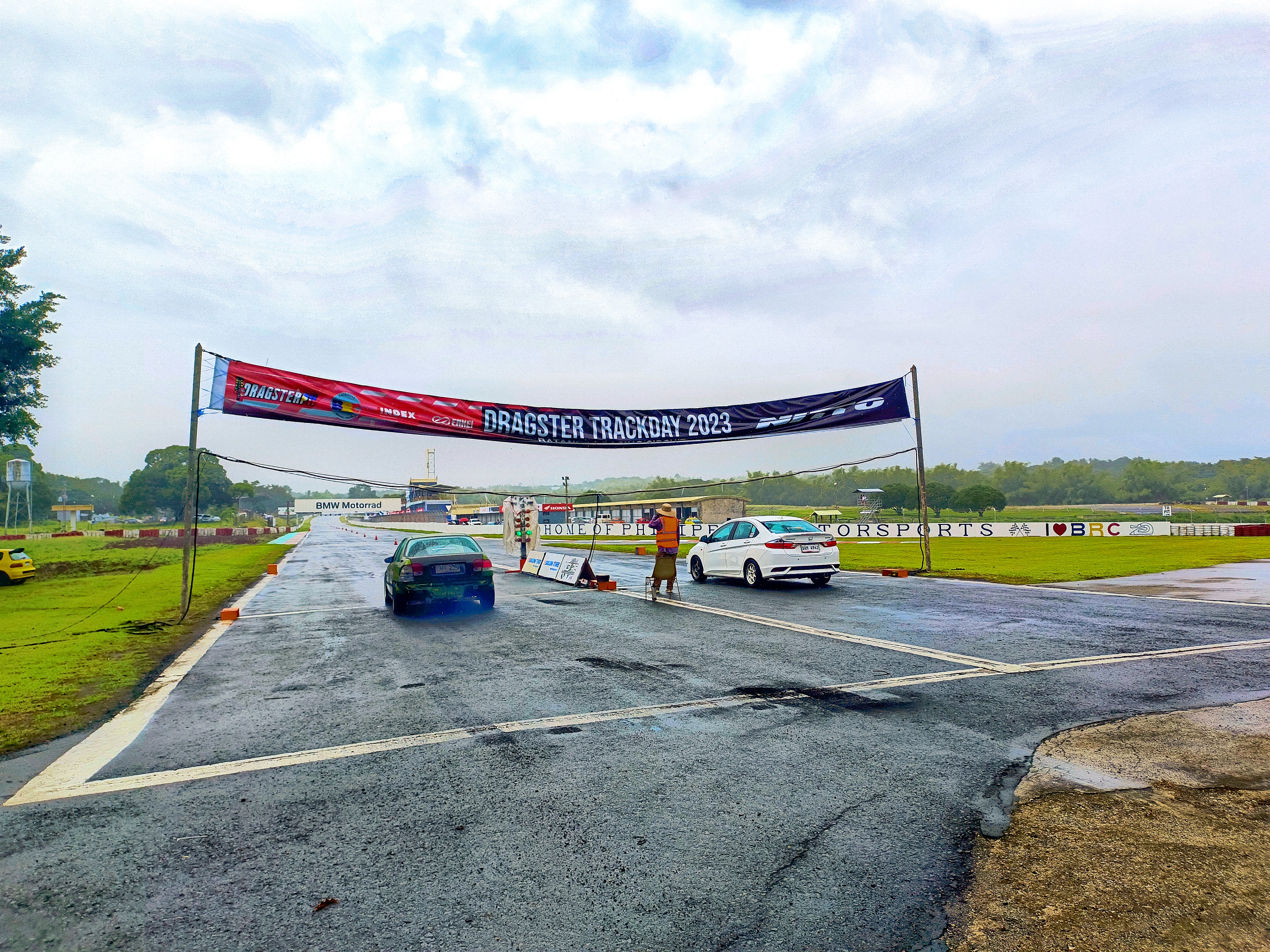
Batangas Racing Circuit caters circuit and drag races, among others

=== Tombol Hill ===
At the foot of the hill is a grotto and on top of it is a statue of Risen Christ.

=== Other attractions ===
- Naambon Falls.
- Batangas Racing Circuit.
- Sunchamp Agri-Tourism Park.
- Villa Crisanta Garden Resort and Pavilion.
- Balai Ising Garden Resort.
- Tan Ville Garden Resort.

== Notable personalities ==
- Jovencito Zuño, former Chief State Prosecutor of the Philippines (1997–2010). A native of Rosario, he was a prominent alumnus of the Padre Vicente Garcia Memorial Academy and served the Department of Justice for decades.
- Angelina Tan, 31st Governor of Quezon province and the first woman to hold the position. She was born and raised in Rosario.
- Oscar Gozos (born 1950), politician who served as Representative of the 4th District of Batangas (2001–2007) and Mayor of Lipa (2007–2010). He was born in Rosario and began his political career in the region.
- Ryan Agoncillo (born 1979), actor and TV host. He belongs to the prominent Agoncillo clan of Rosario; his connection to the town is frequently highlighted in local history.
- Jovit Baldivino (1993–2022), singer and the first-ever winner of Pilipinas Got Talent. He was a proud native of Rosario and became a local cultural icon.
- Jose Romulo (1931–2015), born Romulo Alib Zuño. He was a popular film actor in the 1950s and a former police officer in Rosario before entering the film industry.
- Vicente García (1817–1899), Filipino priest and theologian who famously defended José Rizal's Noli Me Tángere against Spanish censors. He was born in the barrio of Maugat, then a part of Rosario.
- Gaspar Aquino de Belén, a 17th-century poet and translator from Rosario who authored the first Tagalog Pasyon in 1704, a foundational work in Philippine literature.

== Sister cities ==
- Iloilo City
