= Lipa City Colleges =

School in Batangas, Philippines

- Former names: Lipa Business Institute
- Type: Private coeducational basic and higher education institution
- Established: July 1947
- Founders: Ricardo Bonilla; Marcella Bonilla
- President: Glecy B. Mojares
- Location: 10 GA Solis Street, Lipa, Batangas, Philippines
- Website: www.lipacitycolleges.edu.ph

Lipa City Colleges (LCC) located in Lipa City in the province of Batangas of the Philippines. Formerly known as Lipa Business Institute, it is a post-WW2 educational institution established in July 1947 by the late educators Ricardo and Marcela Bonilla. Its basic education department (K-12 level) is known as LCC Silvercrest School.

== History ==
Lipa City Colleges (LCC) traces its origins to 1947 with the founding of the Lipa Business Institute by Ricardo and Marcella Bonilla. Established in July of that year, the school initially operated in rented buildings along B. Morada Avenue with 65 students enrolled in a secondary course.

By the 1948–1949, the institution experienced significant growth in enrollment, prompting the acquisition of a larger building near its original site. This expansion allowed the school to offer a complete secondary course as well as collegiate programs in Liberal Arts, Junior Normal Education, Commerce, and a one-year Secretarial course.

The school later relocated to G.A. Solis Street, where it remains to this day. Alongside the relocation, the institution adopted the name Lipa City Colleges during its third year of operation to reflect its expanded academic offerings, which encompassed elementary, secondary, and tertiary education.

Throughout the following decades, LCC continued to expand its facilities, including the construction of five-storey and four-storey buildings to accommodate increasing enrollment and new programs. The school also established a College of Law and installed a provincial radio station to support students pursuing Broadcast Communication.

Following the tenure of Carlos R. Mojares, the institution's leadership was succeeded by Glecy B. Mojares as president, supported by her daughters Marjorie M. Abiera and Beverly M. Mendoza, who serve as vice presidents for Finance and Internal Affairs, and External Affairs, respectively. Their spouses, Dr. Joe Vincent Abiera and Patrick Mendoza, hold positions as vice presidents for Administration and Corporate Affairs, and General Services.

In the 2009–2010, LCC was authorized to offer a Bachelor of Science in Computer Engineering program, aligning with the increasing demand for technology-related education. The school also completed its own swimming facilities, constructed additional laboratory-equipped annex buildings, and improved athletics provisions. These developments complemented enhancements in research, library resources, laboratory equipment, and faculty training.

In 2011–2012, LCC expanded its educational offerings to include preschool and elementary education through Silvercrest School, a technology-oriented program featuring small class sizes, air-conditioned classrooms, and specialized training in child development for teachers. This addition enabled LCC to provide comprehensive education across three levels: basic, secondary, and tertiary.

== Academic programs ==
LCC is composed of several colleges and departments, including the College of Business Education and Accountancy, College of Computer Studies, College of Criminology, College of Education and Liberal Arts, College of Computer Engineering, College of Hospitality Management, College of Nursing, the High School Department, and the Graduate School.

=== College Degree Programs ===
- College of Education and Liberal Arts
  - Bachelor of Elementary Education
  - Bachelor of Secondary Education (Filipino, Science, Mathematics, English)
  - Bachelor of Arts in English Language Studies
  - Bachelor of Arts in Psychology
- College of Nursing
  - Bachelor of Science in Nursing
- College of Criminology
  - Bachelor of Science in Criminology
- College of Business Education and Accountancy
  - Bachelor of Science in Business Administration (Financial Management, Marketing Management, Human Resource Management)
  - Bachelor of Science in Accountancy
  - Bachelor of Science in Management Accounting
- College of Engineering
  - Bachelor of Science in Computer Engineering
- College of Computer Science
  - Bachelor of Science in Computer Science
- College of International Tourism and Hospitality Management
  - Bachelor of Science in Hospitality Management
  - Bachelor of Science in Tourism Management

=== Graduate Degree Programs ===
- Master of Education Major in Educational Management
- Master in Business Administration
- Master in Public Administration
