= Science Publishing Group =

Predatory publisher

Redirect	Other journal		
Redirect	Name	ISSN	Publisher
Bioprocess Engineering (journal)	Bioprocess Engineering (former name)	0178-515X	Springer
Bioprocess Engineering (journal)	Bioprocess and Biosystems Engineering (current name)	1615-7591	Springer
Humanities and Social Sciences	Humanities and Social Sciences. Latvia	1022-4483	University of Latvia
Industrial Engineering (journal)	Industrial Engineering	1866-2269	Marcel Dekker
International Journal of Data Science and Analysis	International Journal of Data Science and Analytics	2364-415X	Springer

Science Publishing Group (SPG), also known as SciencePG, is a predatory publisher of open-access academic journals and books established in 2012. It has an address in New York City and many of its journals are named American Journal of..., but the company is actually based in Pakistan. The company has been criticized for predatory publishing practices. As of 2019, it publishes 430 journals in various fields.

SPG uses a gold open-access model of publishing which charges the authors. The company claims that articles are peer reviewed by scientific experts before publication. In October 2022, most to all of its journals did not have a scientific editor-in-chief.

== Criticism of publishing practices ==
The company has been criticized for predatory open-access publishing.

In an experiment, university business professor Fiona McQuarrie submitted an article to International Journal of Astrophysics and Space Science from Science Publishing Group, using pseudonyms "Maggie Simpson" and "Edna Krabappel" (characters from the cartoon series The Simpsons). Although the article had been generated by the SCIgen computer program and was nonsense, it was accepted for publication. Librarian Jeffrey Beall, creator of a list of predatory open-access publishers, cites a nonsensical article in American Journal of Applied Mathematics, containing an alleged proof of Buddhist karma.

Science Publishing Group has also been cited more directly as a predatory journal and a scam, using more than 200 pseudo-publications like American Journal of Applied Mathematics or International Journal of Transportation Engineering and Technology. The publisher uses techniques related to scams like aggressive emailing (spamming campaigns) with replaced characters (α for a, for example) or invitations to publish in exchange for a payment in order to fool unsuspecting scholars.

== List of journals ==
SPG publishes hundreds of journals. Many are named American Journal of... or European Journal of... despite SPG being based in Pakistan.

- Advances
- Advances in Applied Physiology
- Advances in Applied Sciences
- Advances in Biochemistry
- Advances in Bioscience and Bioengineering
- Advances in Materials
- Advances in Networks
- Advances in Sciences and Humanities
- Advances in Surgical Sciences
- Advances in Wireless Communications and Networks
- Agriculture, Forestry and Fisheries
- American Journal of Aerospace Engineering
- American Journal of Agriculture and Forestry
- American Journal of Applied Chemistry
- American Journal of Applied Mathematics
- American Journal of Applied Psychology
- American Journal of Applied Scientific Research
- American Journal of Applied and Industrial Chemistry
- American Journal of Art and Design
- American Journal of Artificial Intelligence
- American Journal of Astronomy and Astrophysics
- American Journal of BioScience
- American Journal of Biological and Environmental Statistics
- American Journal of Biomedical and Life Sciences
- American Journal of Bioscience and Bioengineering
- American Journal of Chemical Engineering
- American Journal of Chemical and Biochemical Engineering
- American Journal of Civil Engineering
- American Journal of Clinical and Experimental Medicine
- American Journal of Computer Science and Technology
- American Journal of Construction and Building Materials
- American Journal of Data Mining and Knowledge Discovery
- American Journal of Education and Information Technology
- American Journal of Electrical Power and Energy Systems
- American Journal of Electrical and Computer Engineering
- American Journal of Electromagnetics and Applications
- American Journal of Embedded Systems and Applications
- American Journal of Energy Engineering
- American Journal of Engineering and Technology Management
- American Journal of Entomology
- American Journal of Environmental Protection
- American Journal of Environmental Science and Engineering
- American Journal of Environmental and Resource Economics
- American Journal of Health Research
- American Journal of Heterocyclic Chemistry
- American Journal of Information Science & Technology
- American Journal of Information Science and Technology
- American Journal of Internal Medicine
- American Journal of Laboratory Medicine
- American Journal of Life Sciences
- American Journal of Management Science and Engineering
- American Journal of Materials Synthesis and Processing
- American Journal of Mathematical and Computer Modelling
- American Journal of Mechanical and Industrial Engineering
- American Journal of Mechanical and Materials Engineering
- American Journal of Mechanics and Applications
- American Journal of Medical Education
- American Journal of Modern Energy
- American Journal of Modern Physics
- American Journal of Nano Research and Applications
- American Journal of Nanosciences
- American Journal of Networks and Communications
- American Journal of Neural Networks and Applications
- American Journal of Nursing Science
- American Journal of Nursing and Health Sciences
- American Journal of Operations Management and Information Systems
- American Journal of Optics and Photonics
- American Journal of Pediatrics
- American Journal of Physical Chemistry
- American Journal of Physics and Applications
- American Journal of Plant Biology
- American Journal of Polymer Science and Technology
- American Journal of Psychiatry and Neuroscience
- American Journal of Quantum Chemistry and Molecular Spectroscopy
- American Journal of Remote Sensing
- American Journal of Science, Engineering and Technology
- American Journal of Software Engineering and Applications
- American Journal of Sports Science
- American Journal of Theoretical and Applied Business
- American Journal of Theoretical and Applied Statistics
- American Journal of Traffic and Transportation Engineering
- American Journal of Water Science and Engineering
- American Journal of Zoology
- Animal and Veterinary Sciences
- Applied Engineering
- Applied and Computational Mathematics
- Arabic Language, Literature & Culture
- Automation, Control and Intelligent Systems
- Biochemistry and Molecular Biology
- Biomedical Sciences
- Biomedical Statistics and Informatics
- Bioprocess Engineering
- Cancer Research Journal
- Cardiology and Cardiovascular Research
- Cell Biology
- Central African Journal of Public Health
- Chemical and Biomolecular Engineering
- Clinical Medicine Research
- Clinical Neurology and Neuroscience
- Colloid and Surface Science
- Communication and Linguistics Studies
- Communications
- Composite Materials
- Computational Biology and Bioinformatics
- Control Science and Engineering
- Earth Sciences
- Ecology and Evolutionary Biology
- Economics
- Education Journal
- Engineering Mathematics
- Engineering Physics
- Engineering Science
- Engineering and Applied Sciences
- English Language Education
- English Language, Literature & Culture
- European Business & Management
- European Journal of Biophysics
- European Journal of Clinical and Biomedical Sciences
- European Journal of Preventive Medicine
- Fluid Mechanics
- Frontiers
- Frontiers in Environmental Microbiology
- Higher Education Research
- History Research
- Humanities and Social Sciences
- Hydrology
- Industrial Engineering
- Innovation
- International Journal of Accounting, Finance and Risk Management
- International Journal of Agricultural Economics
- International Journal of Anesthesia and Clinical Medicine
- International Journal of Animal Science and Technology
- International Journal of Applied Agricultural Sciences
- International Journal of Applied Linguistics and Translation
- International Journal of Applied Mathematics and Theoretical Physics
- International Journal of Archaeology
- International Journal of Architecture, Arts and Applications
- International Journal of Astrophysics and Space Science
- International Journal of Atmospheric and Oceanic Sciences
- International Journal of Biochemistry, Biophysics & Molecular Biology
- International Journal of Biomedical Engineering and Clinical Science
- International Journal of Biomedical Materials Research
- International Journal of Biomedical Science and Engineering
- International Journal of Bioorganic Chemistry
- International Journal of Business and Economics Research
- International Journal of Cardiovascular and Thoracic Surgery
- International Journal of Chinese Medicine
- International Journal of Clinical Dermatology
- International Journal of Clinical Oncology and Cancer Research
- International Journal of Clinical Oral and Maxillofacial Surgery
- International Journal of Clinical Urology
- International Journal of Clinical and Developmental Anatomy
- International Journal of Clinical and Experimental Medical Sciences
- International Journal of Computational and Theoretical Chemistry
- International Journal of Data Science and Analysis
- International Journal of Dental Medicine
- International Journal of Diabetes and Endocrinology
- International Journal of Discrete Mathematics
- International Journal of Economic Behavior and Organization
- International Journal of Economics, Finance and Management Sciences
- International Journal of Economy, Energy and Environment
- International Journal of Ecotoxicology and Ecobiology
- International Journal of Education, Culture and Society
- International Journal of Electrical Components and Energy Conversion
- International Journal of Elementary Education
- International Journal of Energy and Environmental Science
- International Journal of Energy and Power Engineering
- International Journal of Engineering Management
- International Journal of English Teaching and Learning
- International Journal of Environmental Chemistry
- International Journal of Environmental Monitoring and Analysis
- International Journal of Environmental Protection and Policy
- International Journal of European Studies
- International Journal of Finance and Banking Research
- International Journal of Fluid Mechanics & Thermal Sciences
- International Journal of Food Engineering and Technology
- International Journal of Food Science and Biotechnology
- International Journal of Gastroenterology
- International Journal of Genetics and Genomics
- International Journal of HIV/AIDS Prevention, Education and Behavioural Science
- International Journal of Health Economics and Policy
- International Journal of High Energy Physics
- International Journal of Homeopathy & Natural Medicines
- International Journal of Hospitality & Tourism Management
- International Journal of Immunology
- International Journal of Industrial and Manufacturing Systems Engineering
- International Journal of Infectious Diseases and Therapy
- International Journal of Information and Communication Sciences
- International Journal of Intelligent Information Systems
- International Journal of Language and Linguistics
- International Journal of Law and Society
- International Journal of Literature and Arts
- International Journal of Management and Fuzzy Systems
- International Journal of Materials Science and Applications
- International Journal of Mechanical Engineering and Applications
- International Journal of Medical Case Reports
- International Journal of Medical Imaging
- International Journal of Microbiology and Biotechnology
- International Journal of Mineral Processing and Extractive Metallurgy
- International Journal of Natural Resource Ecology and Management
- International Journal of Neurologic Physical Therapy
- International Journal of Neurosurgery
- International Journal of Nutrition and Food Sciences
- International Journal of Oil, Gas and Coal Engineering
- International Journal of Ophthalmology & Visual Science
- International Journal of Otorhinolaryngology
- International Journal of Pharmacy and Chemistry
- International Journal of Philosophy
- International Journal of Photochemistry and Photobiology
- International Journal of Psychological Science
- International Journal of Psychological and Brain Sciences
- International Journal of Science and Qualitative Analysis
- International Journal of Science, Technology and Society
- International Journal of Secondary Education
- International Journal of Sensors and Sensor Networks
- International Journal of Sports Science and Physical Education
- International Journal of Statistical Distributions and Applications
- International Journal of Sustainability Management and Information Technologies
- International Journal of Sustainable Development Research
- International Journal of Sustainable and Green Energy
- International Journal of Systems Engineering
- International Journal of Systems Science and Applied Mathematics
- International Journal of Theoretical and Applied Mathematics
- International Journal of Transportation Engineering and Technology
- International Journal of Vocational Education and Training Research
- International Journal of Wireless Communications and Mobile Computing
- International Journal on Data Science and Technology
- International and Public Affairs
- Internet of Things and Cloud Computing
- Journal of Anesthesiology
- Journal of Biomaterials
- Journal of Business and Economic Development
- Journal of Cancer Treatment and Research
- Journal of Chemical, Environmental and Biological Engineering
- Journal of Civil, Construction and Environmental Engineering
- Journal of Diseases and Medicinal Plants
- Journal of Drug Design and Medicinal Chemistry
- Journal of Electrical and Electronic Engineering
- Journal of Energy and Natural Resources
- Journal of Energy, Environmental & Chemical Engineering
- Journal of Family Medicine and Health Care
- Journal of Finance and Accounting
- Journal of Food and Nutrition Sciences
- Journal of Gynecology and Obstetrics
- Journal of Health and Environmental Research
- Journal of Human Resource Management
- Journal of Investment and Management
- Journal of Photonic Materials and Technology
- Journal of Plant Sciences
- Journal of Political Science and International Relations
- Journal of Public Policy and Administration
- Journal of Surgery
- Journal of Water Resources and Ocean Science
- Journal of World Economic Research
- Landscape Architecture and Regional Planning
- Machine Learning Research
- Mathematical Modelling and Applications
- Mathematics Letters
- Mathematics and Computer Science
- Modern Chemistry
- Nanoscience and Nanometrology
- Nuclear Science
- Optics
- Pathology and Laboratory Medicine
- Petroleum Science and Engineering
- Pharmaceutical Science and Technology
- Plant
- Psychology and Behavioral Sciences
- Pure and Applied Mathematics Journal
- Radiation Science and Technology
- Rehabilitation Science
- Reports
- Research & Development
- Reviews
- Science Development
- Science Discovery
- Science Frontiers
- Science Innovation
- Science Journal of Analytical Chemistry
- Science Journal of Applied Mathematics and Statistics
- Science Journal of Business and Management
- Science Journal of Chemistry
- Science Journal of Circuits, Systems and Signal Processing
- Science Journal of Clinical Medicine
- Science Journal of Education
- Science Journal of Energy Engineering
- Science Journal of Public Health
- Science Research
- Science, Technology & Public Policy
- Social Sciences
- Software Engineering
- Teacher Education and Curriculum Studies
- Urban and Regional Planning
- World Journal of Agricultural Science and Technology
- World Journal of Applied Chemistry
- World Journal of Applied Physics
- World Journal of Food Science and Technology
- World Journal of Materials Science and Technology
- World Journal of Medical Case Reports
- World Journal of Public Health
