= Retable of the Virgin of Montserrat =

Painting by Bartolomé Bermejo

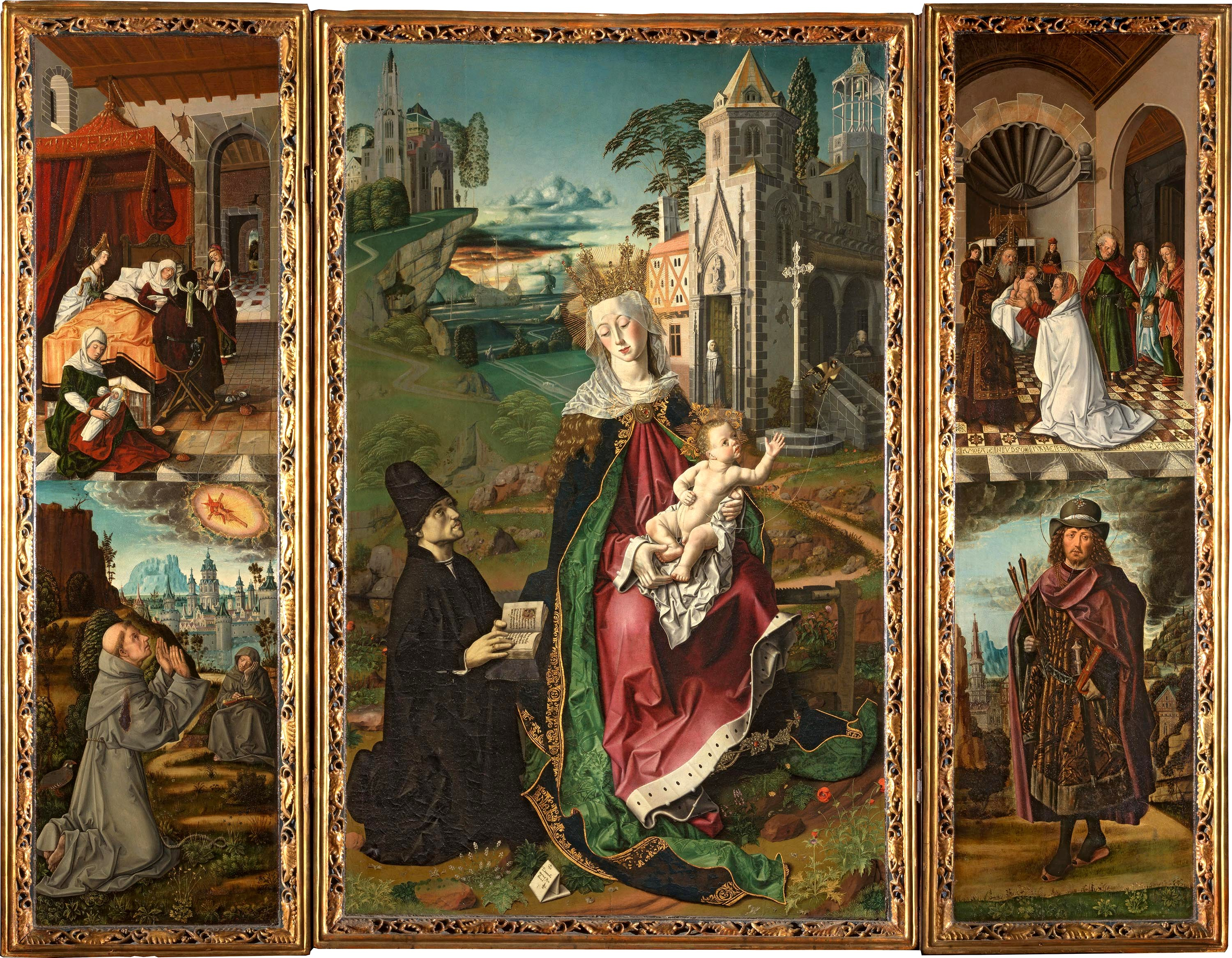
- Artist: Bartolomé Bermejo
- Year: c. 1485
- Medium: Oil on panel
- Dimensions: 156.5 cm × 100.5 cm (61.6 in × 39.6 in)
- Location: Acqui Cathedral, Acqui Terme

The Retable of the Virgin of Montserrat is an oil on panel triptych painted by three Spanish painters: Bartolomé Bermejo, who painted the central panel around 1485, and by Rodrigo and Francisco de Osona, who painted the side panels. (A retable is a structure or element placed either on or immediately behind and above the altar or communion table of a church.)

== History ==
The work was commissioned in Spain by the Acquese merchant Francesco Della Chiesa, active in Valencia from the 1470s, and arrived in his city origin by testamentary legacy at the beginning of the 16th century, to be placed in the family chapel erected by Francesco and his brother Giuliano in the cathedral. The commissioning of altarpieces by famous painters in the cities in which they worked was a widespread practice in the families of Italian merchants active outside the Peninsula and responded to a specific strategy of promoting their family in their homeland: famous examples are the Florentine Portinari Altarpiece of Hugo van der Goes, for Piedmont, the case of the Villa bankers, who commissioned Rogier van der Weyden to send two different triptychs to Chieri: the Annunciation Triptych, now divided between the Louvre and the Galleria Sabauda, and the one known as the Abegg Triptych, now preserved in Riggisberg, Switzerland. The Della Chiesa family had a commercial base in Savona, home of Pope Sixtus IV, whose nephew Giuliano, the future Pope Julius II, was commendatory abbot of the Santa Maria de Montserrat Abbey in Catalonia; for this reason it was proposed to see at the basis of the choice of the commissioned subject a celebratory intention towards the family of the reigning pope, even if it is very possible that this choice was motivated by a personal devotion of the client to the Virgin of Montserrat, which in Spain, where he resided for a long time, is the object of a widespread cult.

The work reached Acqui after 1510, as evidenced by the client's will which came to light in 1987, and was placed on the Della Chiesa altar in the cathedral, from which it was moved in the 1730s at the behest of Bishop Giovanni Battista Roero di Pralormo, who wanted to give it a central role in the new Chapter House he had built around 1734. A repainting that took place at an unspecified moment in the history of the painting between the 16th and 17th centuries, eliminated in 1987, changed the clothes of the donor figure, and in particular the hat, transforming him into an ecclesiastic. The work, unknown outside the provincial borders, was published for the first time in 1907 in "L'Arte", the magazine directed by Adolfo Venturi, by Francesco Pellati, who however did not find, despite research, any document relating to it. Another important stage in its critical rediscovery was the restoration which took place in 1987, which eliminated, as mentioned, the repaintings and brought to light the splendid original colours, revealing it as a true masterpiece of the late fifteenth century in Spain. The restoration was accompanied by new documentary research which led to the discovery of the client's will, published in a book on the triptych released in the same year. Bermejo's painting is today one of the main artistic attractions of the city of Acqui.

== Description ==
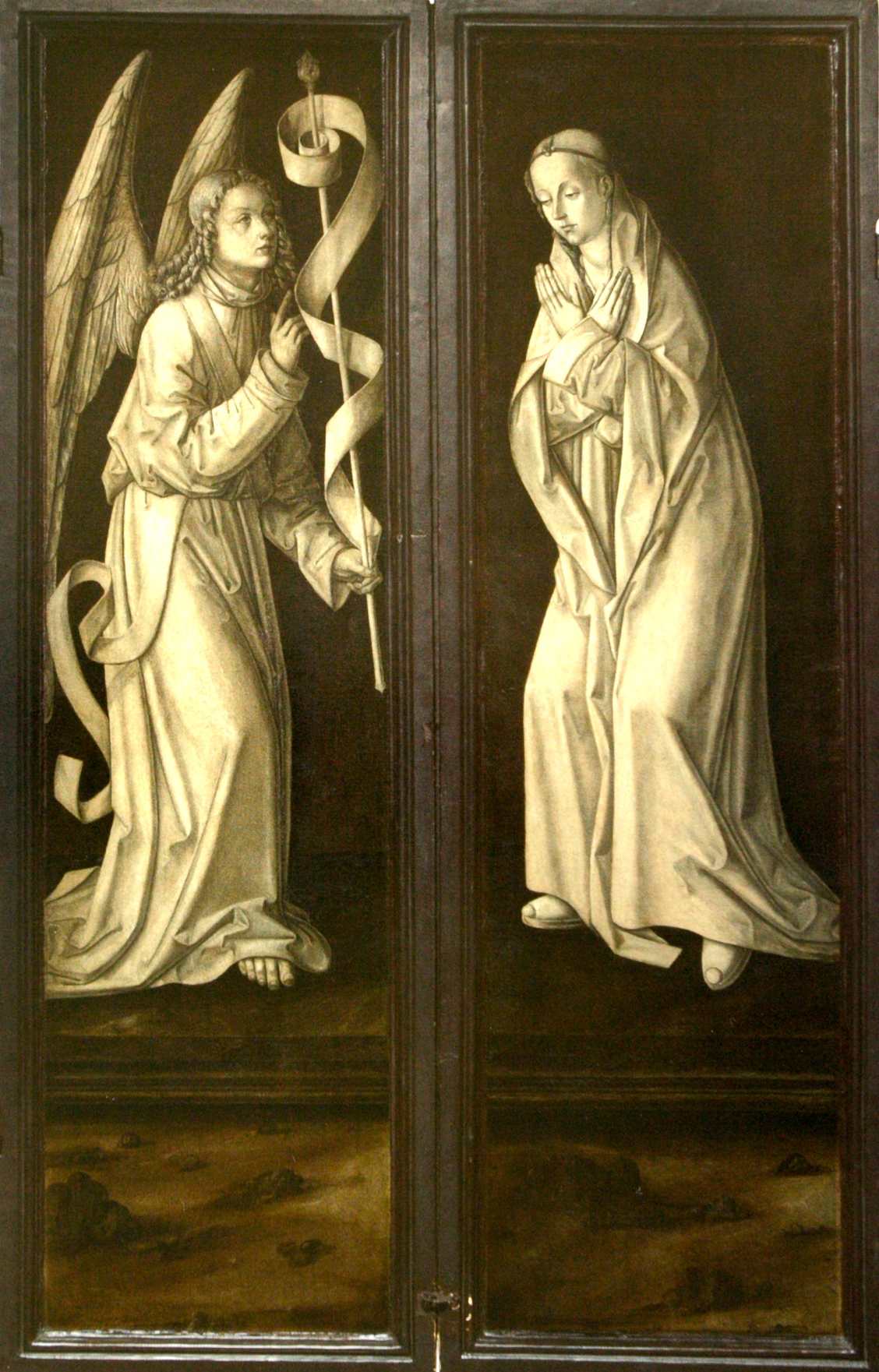
The closed-door triptych with the Annunciation

The central panel of the triptych was painted by Bartolomé Bermejo around 1485, under commission by Francesco della Chiesa, a merchant from the town of Acqui. Having an interest in Flemish paintings, della Chiesa commissioned the triptych for his chapel at the Acqui Cathedral, possibly as a sign of gratitude for his safe return from a journey between Savona and Valencia. He is depicted in the central panel kneeling at the side of the Virgin. The side panels were painted by Spanish painters Rodrigo and his son Francisco de Osona.

The triptych's style shows influences of Flemish art of Jan van Eyck, Dirk Bouts and the Master of the Legend of Saint Lucy. The arresting view of the coast in the background is believed to be an Italian influence.

=== The closed triptych: the Annunciation ===
The artwork, a masterpiece by Bermejo, a leading exponent of the Hispano-Flemish school, is a creation close to Flanders both in its general conception and style. The format of the triptych composed of rectangular panels, with hinged sides, is typical of Early Netherlandish painting from its beginnings, as are the figures painted in grisaille on the outside of the doors, namely the Archangel Gabriel and the Virgin, which go to create, in a closed triptych, the monochrome scene of the Annunciation, from which the incarnation of Christ originates, depicted as a child inside and therefore a necessary premise for what will be seen once the doors are opened. The two figures, standing on a molded base with veins painted to imitate marble, are represented standing to follow the vertical shape of the doors: the gait of the archangel, coming from the left, is suggested by the movement of the right leg, which protruding the foot from under the clothes, while symmetrically Mary's left leg, depicted with her arms crossed on her chest as a sign of humility, is slightly bent to indicate the beginning of the genuflection; the remaining space in the foreground at the feet of the figures, beyond the base, is occupied by bare ground strewn with rocks.

=== The central altarpiece ===
==== The main scene ====
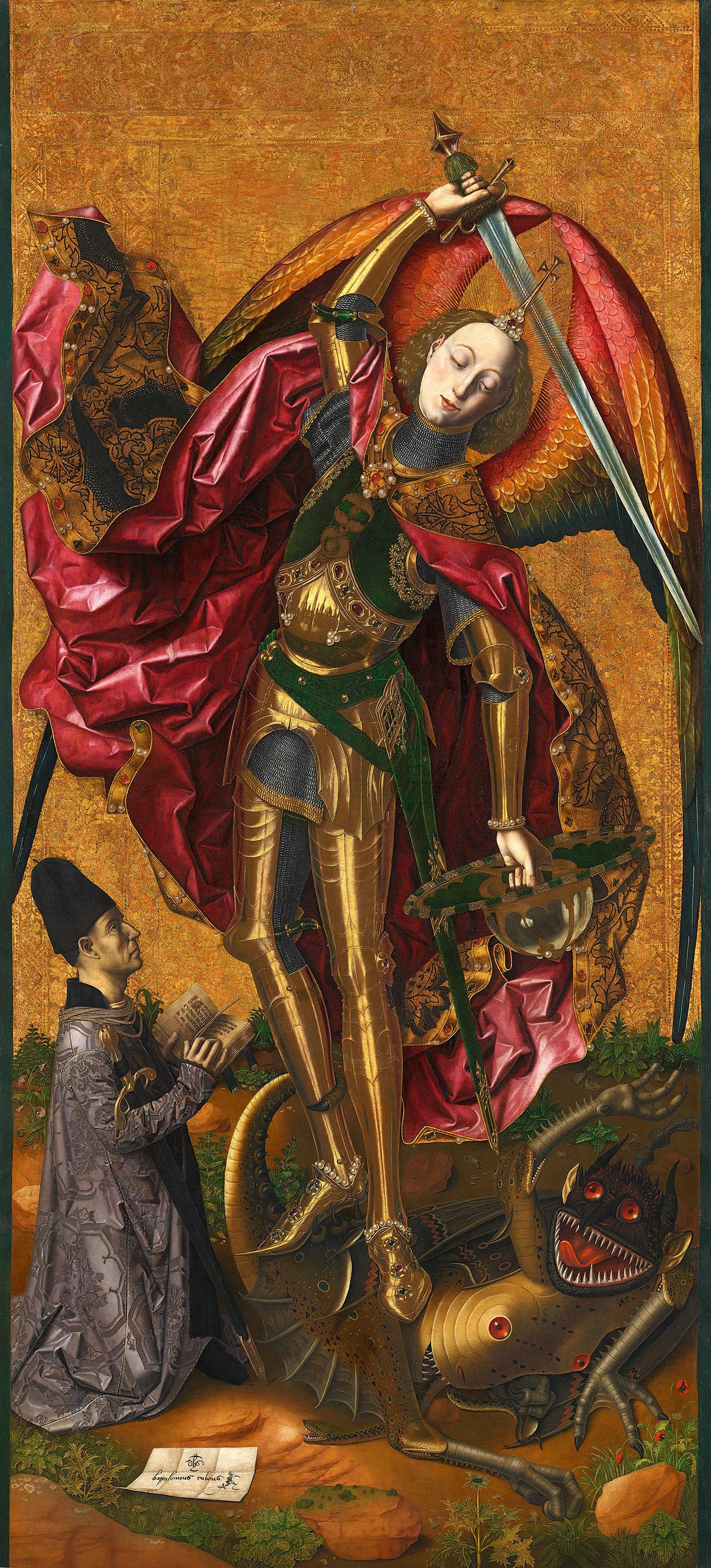
The Saint Michael in London, with the figure of the patron similar to that of the Acqui triptych

Inside, the central panel depicts the Virgin immersed in the landscape with the Child on her lap, who holds in one hand a thread to which a goldfinch is tied, a prefiguration of his Passion, towards which he turns his head with a strong twist of the body. Maria is seated on a carpenter's saw which identifies her as Our Lady of Montserrat (literally sawn / serrated mountain, due to the characteristic profile of the mountain, represented in heraldry and in art with a mountain surmounted or crossed by a saw, in allusion to the legend that would have it cut by angels with this tool to make room for the monastery). The Virgin is depicted as Queen, with the crown on her head and very rich regal robes: the mantle, dark blue with gold guilloche on the outside and damask green on the inside, closed on the chest with a cope clasp, covers the red tunic with the flaps of ermine, under which another tunic of dark velvet shows its flap embroidered with pearls and precious stones. The donor is kneeling at the feet of the Virgin, who closely resembles, but surpasses in quality in the greater spatial ease and vividness of the portrait, the homologous figure present in the St. Michael of Bermejo in the National Gallery of London. The wealthy merchant from Acqui holds a prayer book in his hands open to the page of the Salve Regina and directs his gaze together with his prayers upwards towards the Virgin; he is dressed completely in black, over a white shirt that can be seen in the collar and in the cut of the sleeves, with a tall cap of the same color; two rings on his hands suggest his wealth. The lawn on which he rests his knees and on which the scroll with the painter's signature is placed in the foreground, represented in perspective like a folded letter, is strewn with the flowers of May, the Marian month, among which the poppy is recognisable, the wild sage, stock, eryngo and bindweed.

==== The landscape ====
The background is taken up by a deep bird's-eye view of the landscape sloping down towards the sea, with two Gothic-style religious buildings: on the right, near the group, a Franciscan convent: from the church portal, dominated by a cymatium with inside, in the tympanum, a statue of the Madonna with Child in her arms, a young friar looks out; behind him, inside, we can see a bush of roses, another flower sacred to the Virgin and her attribute. On the side façade, in addition to a street crucifix, there are two arches, one of the two accessible by a staircase, which symbolize the cloister of the convent and the contemplative life that takes place inside it, personified by an elderly friar reading a book leaning on the parapet. On the left, high up on a cliff overlooking the sea, stands a church with a high bell tower which could represent the ancient cathedral of the Priamar of Savona, the commercial base city of the Della Chiesa family. The marina, in the center of the background, illuminated by a beautiful sunset sky, shows a port in the distance and some cargo ships alluding to the client's mercantile activity.

=== The side doors ===
The two side panels, of inferior quality, are attributed to Rodrigo and Francesco de Osona, owners of a very active workshop in Valencia in those years. It is possible that the setting of the two lower scenes is the work of Bermejo, who in any case did not have a hand in it, while the two upper scenes, with some stylistic and above all perspective characteristics closer to Italy, are believed not to be of his creation The panels are divided in two horizontally: in the lower area there are two saints, while the upper half is occupied by two scenes from the Life of the Virgin, namely her birth, on the left, a rich domestic interior scene, and the Presentation of Jesus to the Temple, on the right, which since the first publication of the work by Pellati has been compared to the Italian Renaissance due to its perspective structure; on the checkered floor, in the foreground, there is an inscription that has never been deciphered, probably imaginary. In the lower half of the left door Saint Francis is represented receiving the stigmata surrounded by nature, with Brother Leo sleeping and a castle in a lake in the background; in the right door the saint, described by Pellati cautiously as a "warrior saint", was recognized as Saint Sebastian because of the arrows in his hand; however, it is more likely to be St. Julian the Hospitaller, as demonstrated by some attributes such as the pilgrim's dress, the sword and the book and the hunting scene in the background, linked to episodes of the saint's life: the two lower areas of the side panels, thus, are occupied by the patron saints of Francesco Della Chiesa, the client, and his brother Giuliano.

== Bibliography ==
- Francesco Pellati (1907). "Bartolomeus Rubeus e un trittico firmato della cattedrale di Acqui" [Bartolomeus Rubeus and a signed triptych from the cathedral of Acqui]. L'Arte. Rivista di Storia dell'Arte medioevale e moderna e d'arte decorativa (in Italian). Vol. X. pp. 401–408.
- Gianni Rebora; Giacomo Rovera; Giandomenico Bocchiotti (1987). Bartolomé Bermejo e il trittico di Acqui [Bartolomé Bermejo and the Acqui triptych] (in Italian). Acqui Terme: L'Ancora.
- Antonella Caldini (1992–1993). Bartolomè Bermejo e il Trittico di Acqui [Bartolomè Bermejo and the Acqui Triptych] (in Italian). rel. Angelo Rossi. tesi di laurea dattiloscritta conservata nella Biblioteca Civica di Acqui Terme.
- Judith Berg-Sobré (1998). Bartolomé de Càrdenas "El Bermejo". Itinerant Painter in the Crown of Aragon [Bartolomé de Càrdenas "El Bermejo". Itinerant Painter in the Crown of Aragon] (in Italian). San Francisco: International Scholars Publications.
- Marco Casamurata; Mauro Magliani (photographer) (2019). Il Trittico della Vergine di Monserrat, Bartolomé Bermejo [The Triptych of the Virgin of Monserrat, Bartolomé Bermejo] (in Italian). Verona: Aurora.
