= Acqui Cathedral =

Cathedral in the city of Acqui Terme, Italy

Coordinates: 44°40′27.17″N 8°28′16.36″E

Acqui Cathedral Cathedral of the Assumption of Mary (Cattedrale Maria Santissima Assunta)
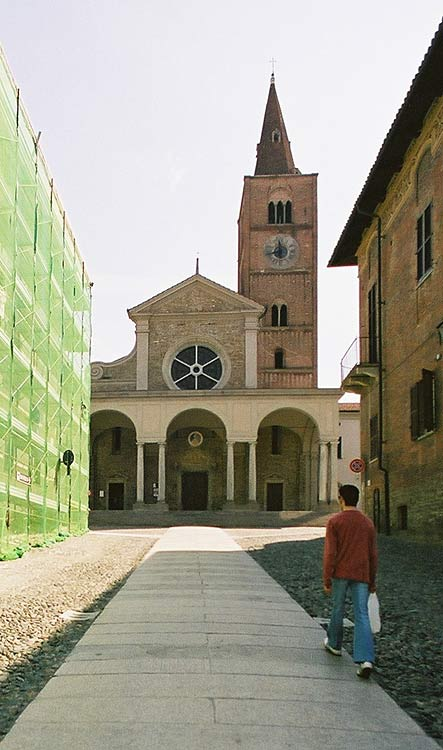
- The façade of the cathedral

Religion
- Affiliation: Catholic
- Province: Piedmont

Location
- Location: Acqui Terme, Italy
- Interactive map of Acqui Cathedral; Cathedral of the Assumption of Mary (Cattedrale Maria Santissima Assunta)

Architecture
- Type: Church
- Style: Romanesque
- Groundbreaking: 11c
- Completed: 15c

Acqui Cathedral (Italian: Duomo di Acqui, Cattedrale di Santa Maria Assunta) is a Catholic cathedral in the city of Acqui Terme, in the province of Alessandria and the region of Piedmont, Italy. Dedicated to the Assumption of the Virgin Mary, it is the seat of the Bishop of Acqui.

== History and description ==
Location of Acqui Cathedral

While the bishopric has been established since at least the 4th century, the present cathedral building was begun under bishop Primo (989-1018) and was consecrated in 1067 by bishop Guido. The ground plan is in the shape of a Latin cross, and there are five aisles (but until the 18th century, only three), terminating in three semi-circular apses. Of the Romanesque structure there still remain visible the apses, the transept, and the crypt, which underlies both the transept and the choir. The remainder has been subject to further work in later centuries.

The terracotta bell tower was finished in 1479, and the bells moved from the old campanile. The main entrance in marble, by Giovanni Antonio Pilacorte, dates from 1481, and the rose window above it from around the same date, while the portico is 17th century. The interior was re-fitted in Baroque woodwork, and was decorated with frescos and stucco work from the 17th to the 19th centuries.

Next door are the canons' cloisters of the late 15th century, and some Roman ruins.

== Works of art ==
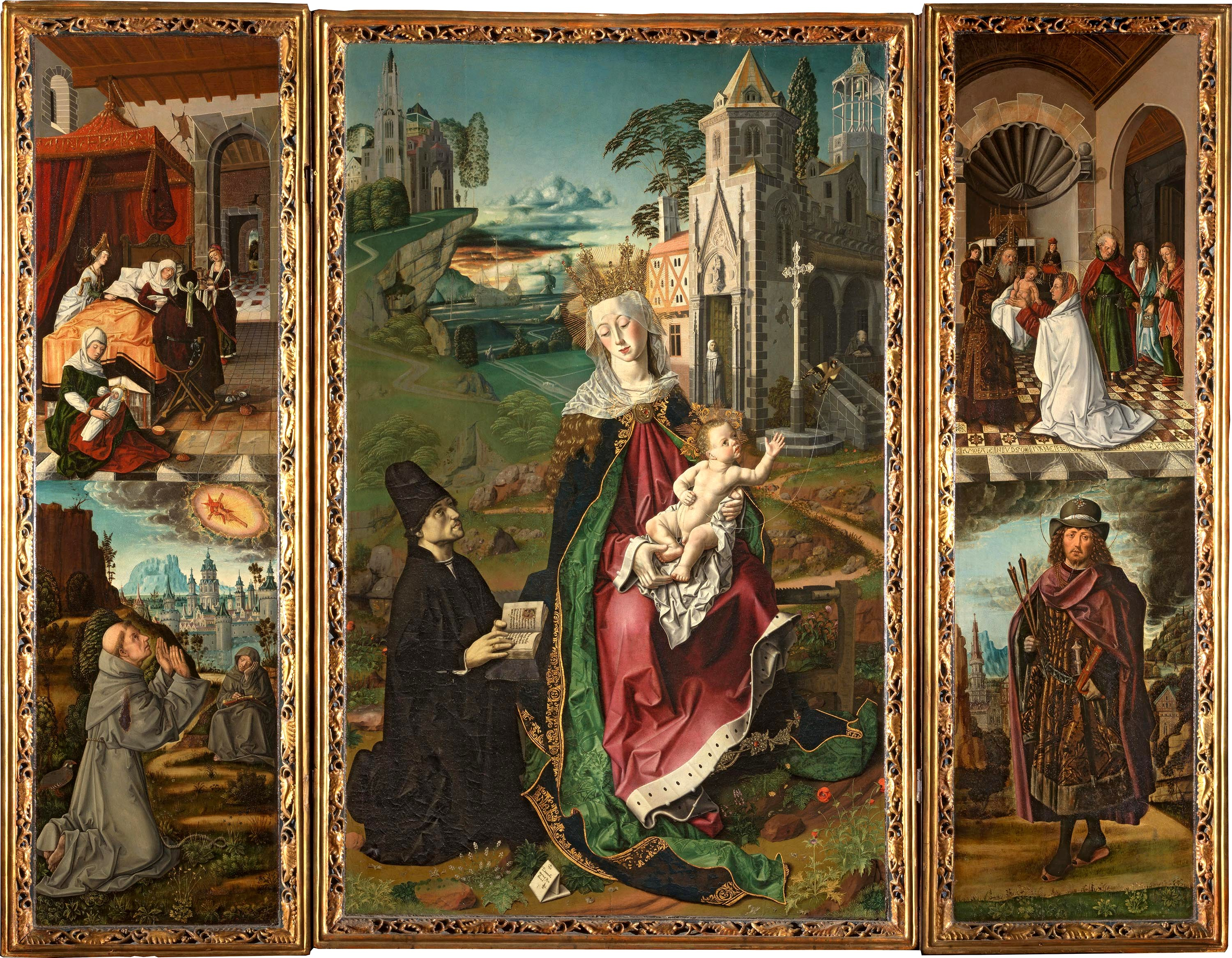
Triptych of the Virgin of Montserrat, by Bermejo

The 19th century pulpit and the Baroque altar of Saint Guido in the transept are worthy of note.

The most important work of art in the cathedral by far however is the Retable of the Virgin of Montserrat, the work of the 15th century Spanish painter Bartolomé Bermejo, who painted the central panel around 1485, and by Rodrigo and Francisco de Osona who painted the side panels, in the chapter house.

== See also ==
- High medieval domes

== Sources ==
- Crosetto A., (2001). Acqui Terme. Indagini archeologiche nella cripta della cattedrale (1991). "Quaderni della Soprintendenza Archeologica del Piemonte", 18. (in Italian)
- Porter, Arthur Kingsley (1916). Lombard Architecture. Vol. II. Yale University Press. pp. 14–24.
- Rovera, Giacomo; Bocchiotti, Giandomenico (1987). Bartolomé Bermejo e il Trittico di Acqui (in Italian). Acqui Terme: L' Áncora.
- Comune di Acqui: Monumenti (in Italian)
- Acqui Terme di Acqui: Duomo (in Italian)
- Lancora.com: Palazzo vescovile e cattedrale Acqui Terme (article of 28 March 2004) (in Italian)
- Diocese of Acqui (in Italian)
