= Martín Bernat =

Spanish painter

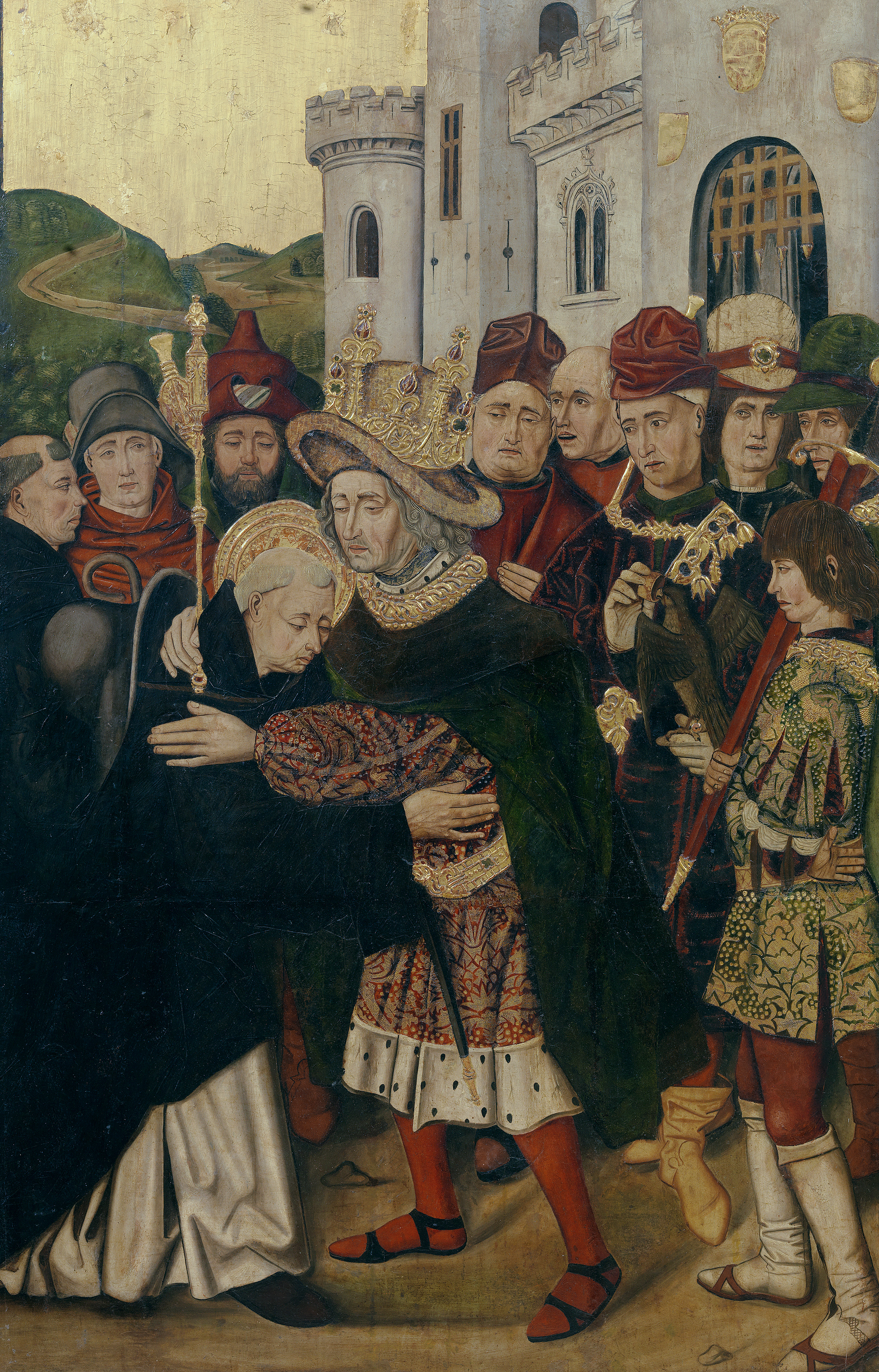
Fernando I of Castile welcoming Santo Domingo de Silos by Martin Bernat and Bartolomé Bermejo, Museo del Prado, from the Santo Domingo de Silos altarpiece

Martín Bernat (fl. 1450 -1505) was a Spanish Gothic style painter, active in Zaragoza, where he had a long collaboration with Bartolomé Bermejo. His dates of birth and death are not known.

== Early career ==
Son of another painter of the same name, it was documented that Bernat "promised to end within two years the altar of Santo Domingo de Silos left in Daroca unfinished by Bartolome Bermejo". The altarpiece, probably dismantled in the eighteenth century as a result of a fire suffered by the church, preserved in the Museo del Prado central table with the effigy of the owner, probably the only fully completed by Bermejo, and depicting the king Fernando I of Castile welcoming Santo Domingo de Silos. According to the documentation Bernat work was completed or retouched by Bermejo in incarnations. Between 1479 and 1484 he appears again documented together with Bartolomé Bermejo, busy restoring the polychrome altarpiece of the Cathedral and the painting of John de Lobera altarpiece for the chapel of the Visitation of the Pillar of Zaragoza, which now resides in a private collection.

== Collaborations ==
This collaboration between Bernat and Bermejo left a deep imprint on Bernat and, generally speaking, in the Aragonese painting of the late fifteenth century, where enshrined saint typology created by Bermejo in Santo Domingo de Daroca is repeated often, especially in works attributed to Bernat or his circle, such as the St. Victorian between San Gaudioso and Saint Nazaire Cathedral or the San Blas Barbastro between San Vicente and San Lorenzo of the parish of St. Mary Magdalene of Lécera.

Along with Miguel Ximénez, Bernat was hired in 1485 to execute the high altar of the parish church of Blesa in the Province of Teruel, dedicated to the Legend of the Holy Cross, now in the Museum of Zaragoza. The fact that most of the payments were intended to Ximénez, who in 1487 charged and alone, suggests that participation was a minor Bernat contribution. He and his workshop in this altarpiece attributed the stronger character tables "primitive" and greater proximity to Bermejo, which are located in the attic, with the representation of a number of prophets, and the right side of the street, destined to the Passion of Christ, with scenes of Jesus before Caiaphas, Jesus with the Cross and Descent.

== Work remains ==
Both painters, with independent workshops but often associated in large works, again collaborated in 1489 to decorate the altar of All Saints for the Augustinians of Zaragoza, a lost work which is known from the fact that the two painters traveled to Barcelona accompanied by a monk of the convent of Aragon, in order to study the high altar of St. Augustine by Jaume Huguet. A year later Bernat came into contact with the Castilian painter Fernando del Rincón, signing a partnership agreement for future collaborations in Zaragoza.

The surviving documents refer to a large number of contracts, and indicate that Bernat enjoyed an excellent reputation and could maintain a fruitful workshop, whose impact can be seen in numerous altarpieces in the Aragonese region. However the only works documented and preserved, with the exception of the Blesa altarpiece, are quite late, both from 1493 and listed on the marriage contract of the painter with Maria de Soria. These are the altarpieces for the chapel of Talavera or the Purification in the Tarazona Cathedral with interesting allegories of the Virtues and the Liberal Arts painted in grisaille, and the one in the church of San Juan Bautista de Zaidín, from which is preserved the central panel, in the Diocesan and Regional Museum of Lérida.
