= Bartolomé Bermejo =

Spanish painter

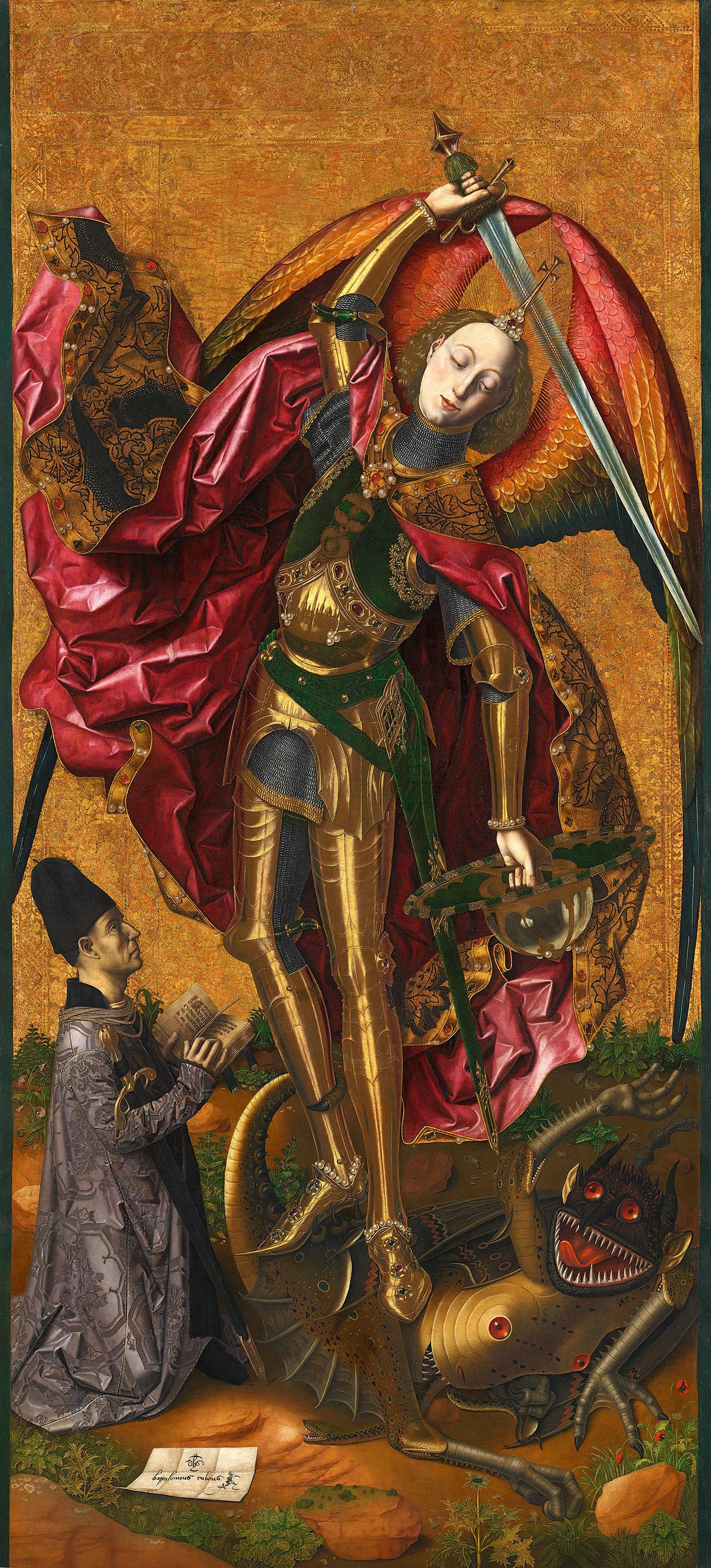
Saint Michael triumphant over the Devil, circa 1468, National Gallery, London

Bartolomé Bermejo (c. 1440 – c.1501) was a Spanish painter who adopted Flemish painting techniques and conventions and so is considered as an artist of the Hispano-Flemish style. Born in Cordoba, he is known for his work in the Crown of Aragon, including the Principality of Catalonia and the Kingdom of Valencia. His real name was Bartolomé de Cárdenas: the name Bermejo, which means auburn in Spanish, possibly relates to his hair colour. Bermejo may relate also to his surname, Cárdenas; Cardeno means purplish. He signs himself sometimes as "Bartolomeus Rubeus" meaning possibly "Bartholomew the Redhead".

== Biography ==
According to the inscription "OPUS.BARTOLOMEI.VERMEIO.CORDUBENSIS" on the frame of one of his most famous paintings, Canon Lluís Desplà's Pietà, Bermejo was born in Córdoba. This theory has been recently cast into doubt, for there is no documentary or stylistic evidence of his presence there.

Documentation places his activity in four cities of the Crown of Aragon: Valencia (1468), Daroca (1474), Zaragoza (1477–84) and Barcelona (1486–1501).

Though Bermejo was possibly not a converso himself, he did marry one: the Daroca widow Gracia de Palaciano. Bermejo's wife, who allegedly did not know the Creed, was investigated by the Spanish Inquisition.

== Career ==
Although it is unclear where Bermejo received his training, his complete mastery of the oil glaze technique suggests direct contact with 15th century Flemish painting, which he was able to adapt perfectly to the demands of Spanish altarpieces of the period: large-scale retables with many panels. Though his documented career spans over thirty years, he was peripatetic: he never settled in one place for more than a decade. Also, in a period and place where painting was a business, and work was generally negotiated by contract, there is both direct and indirect evidence that he was professionally unreliable, though apparently his outstanding talent made patrons willing to take the risk. One contract (discussed below) contained a clause providing for the excommunication of the painter in the event of unsatisfactory performance. Commissions were often undertaken by Bermejo in collaboration with inferior local painters, possibly because of guild restrictions. At least three major altarpieces that he undertook, the high altar retables of Santo Domingo de Silos in Daroca and Santa Anna in Barcelona, and the triptych of the Virgin of Montserrat in Valencia, were left incomplete for others to finish.

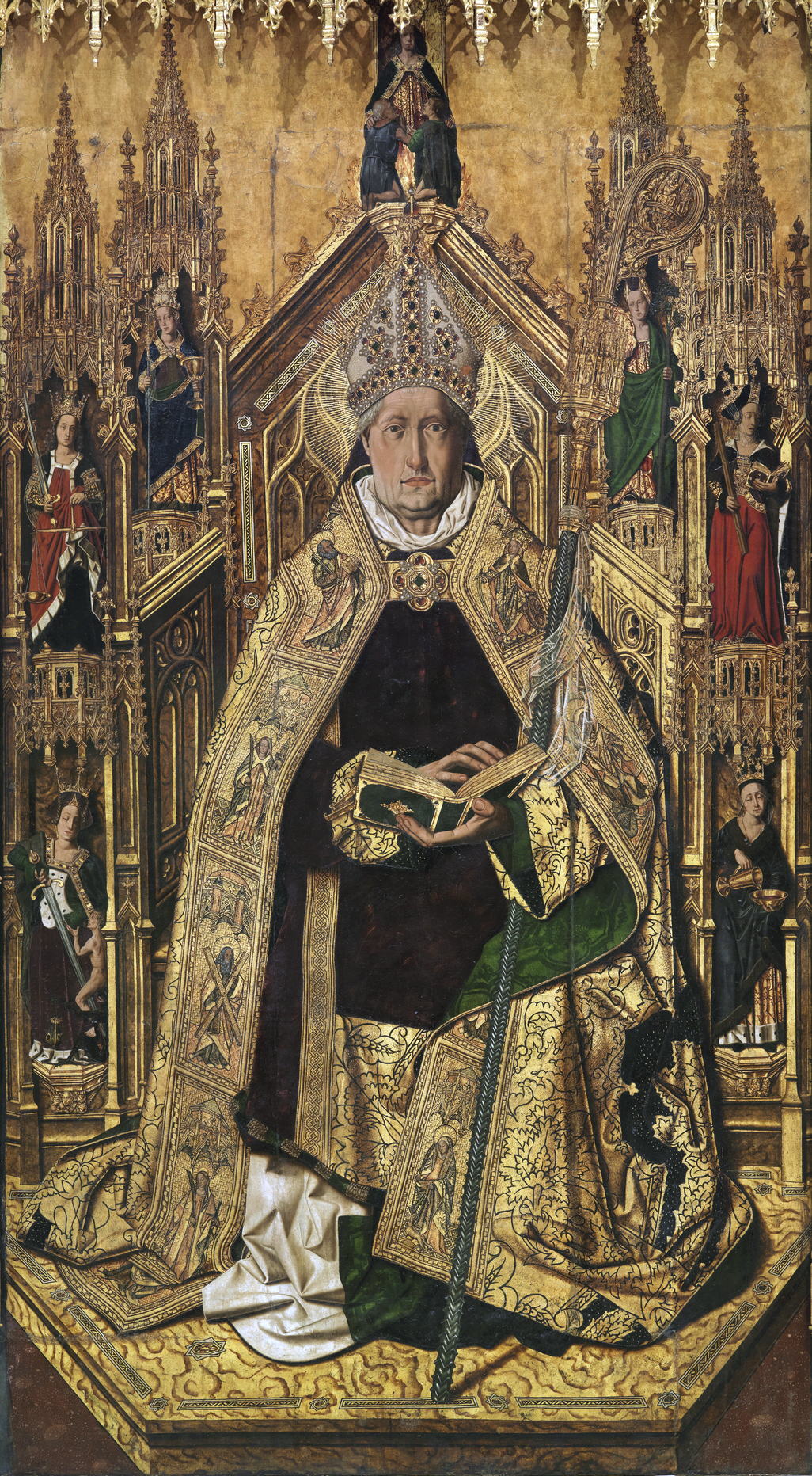
Saint Dominic of Silos enthroned as a Bishop, circa 1474 - 1477, Museo del Prado

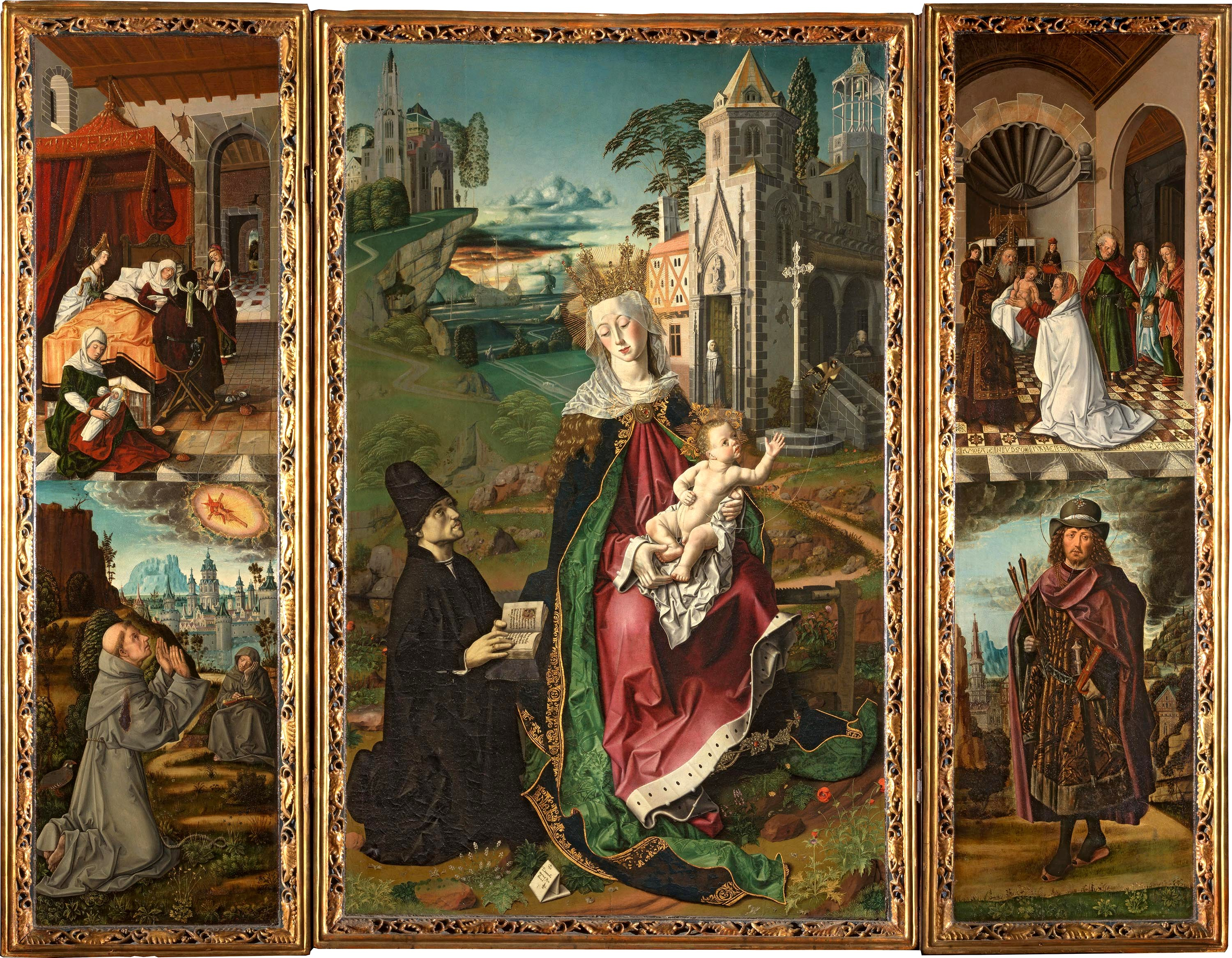
Retable of the Virgin of Montserrat, circa 1485, Acqui Cathedral, Acqui Terme

=== Valencia ===
Bermejo's documented professional career began in Valencia in 1468 with a first payment for an altarpiece dedicated to Saint Michael for the Parish Church in Tous, near Valencia (the central panel of which is in the collection of the National Gallery, London). The patron was a local nobleman, Antonio Juan, to whom Tous belonged. No documentation of other work from that period seems to have survived, but there is evidence that he returned there for a short time around 1485, when he painted the signed central panel of the Triptych of the Virgin of Montserrat, ordered by an Italian merchant who was living there, Francesco della Chiesa, for the Cathedral of Acqui Terme, his hometown. The wings were carried out by the Valencian painter Rodrigo de Osona, though there is some evidence that Bermejo was responsible for at least part of the underdrawing and some of the painting.

=== Aragon ===
By 1474, Bermejo had moved on to the Aragonese town of Daroca, where he signed a contract to paint the high altarpiece for the church of Santo Domingo de Silos. This contract is full of guarantees to keep Bermejo working on the altarpiece, including the threat of excommunication if he didn't complete it, suggesting his reputation for unreliability.

Exactly how long Bermejo actually resided in Daroca is not clear; but he did complete at least one other altarpiece there, dedicated to Saint Engracia (now divided among various locations), and a Dead Christ in his Tomb for a local merchant, the Converso Juan de Loperuelo (Museu del Castell de Perelada). Bermejo married the Daroca widow Gracia de Palaciano.

The doubts to his reliability proved true: by 1477, Bermejo had moved on to Zaragoza, having left only the central panel of the Santo Domingo de Silos altarpiece complete and being duly excommunicated. A Zaragoza painter, Martín Bernat, agreed to finish it, but a second contract, in 1477, was for a collaboration between the two painters. Analysis of the surviving panels of this altarpiece, now in the Prado, confirms this, as the other extant lateral narratives are in the coarser style associated with Bernat. ). Bermejo's excommunication was revoked shortly after the signing of the second contract, and it was duly completed. He and Bernat continued to collaborate in Zaragoza, notably in the Altarpiece of the Virgin of the Snows for Juan Lobera for the latter's chapel in the church of El Pilar.(1479). In 1482–3, Bermejo was part of a team (which also included Bernat) that reapplied the polychromy on the alabaster High Altar Retable of Zaragoza Cathedral. For this work, it is known that he was paid more than any of the others, and also insisted on private working space for himself so that nobody, fellow painters or others, could observe him while he worked; another unusual demand at the time .

=== Barcelona ===
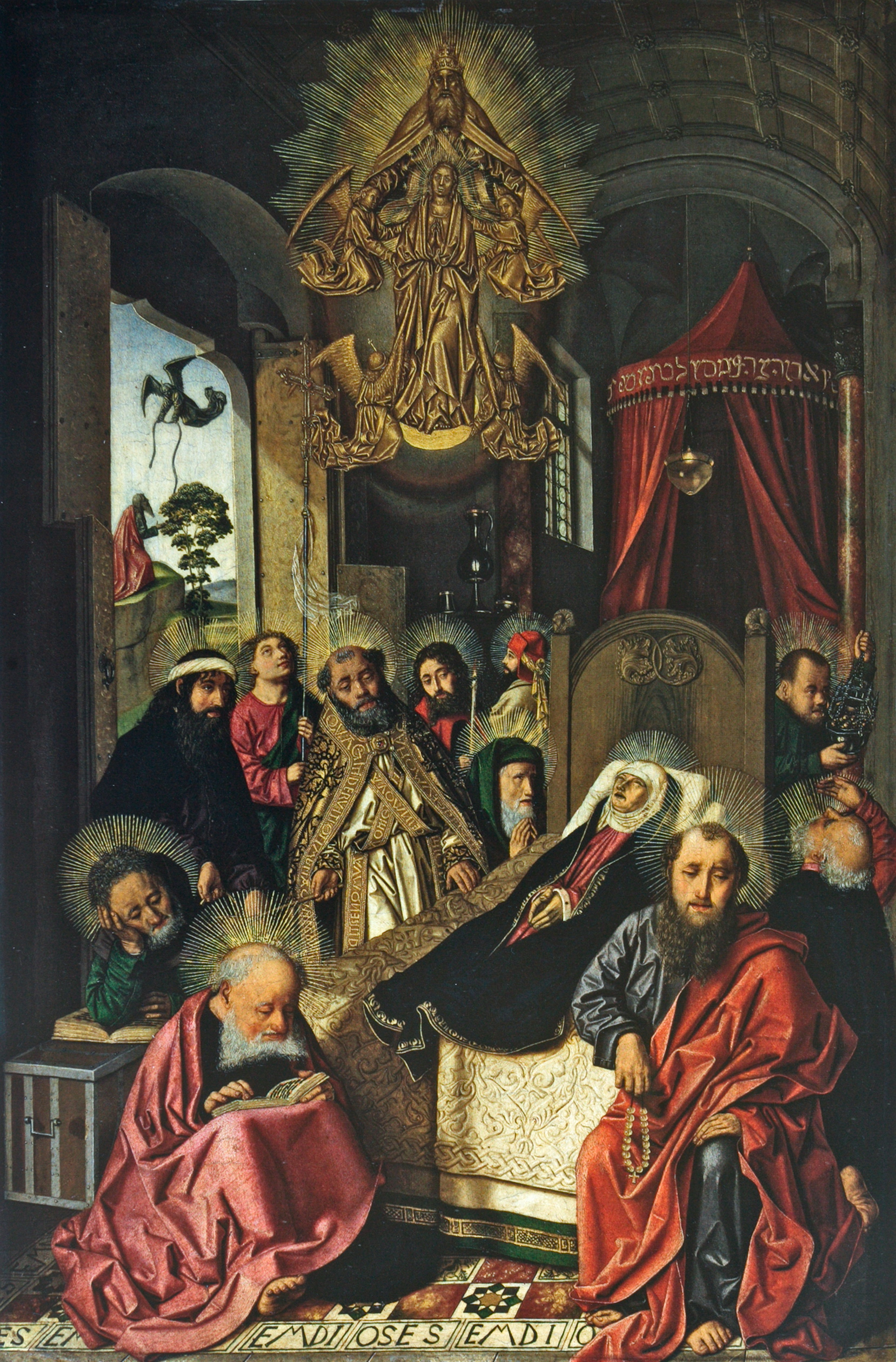
The Death and Assumption of Mary, 1468-1472 (Seville)

Whether or not he briefly returned to Valencia, Bermejo's later years were spent in Barcelona, where he first worked on the High Altar Retable for the convent church of Santa Anna (carpentry contract,1485) the surviving panels from this retable were destroyed in 1936, but old photographs suggest the intervention of a second, later hand, opening up the possibility that he did not finish this work either. Here, he completed his masterwork for Canon Lluís Desplà i Oms' private chapel, the Pietà in 1490, which contains the donor's portrait. Other documents in Barcelona concern designs for stained-glass windows. the Noli Me Tangere for the baptismal chapel of Barcelona Cathedral (1495) and two windows representing the virtues Faith and Hope for the Llotja of Barcelona in 1500 and 1501 (now destroyed). It is a testament to his skills and talent that though Barcelona was in a severe economic depression at this period, Bermejo continued to receive commissions from both its Cathedral Chapter and the municipal government.

== Style ==
Beyond his skill in oil glaze painting, Bermejo's distinctive style can be seen in his physical types, a lively sense of drama in his narrative scenes, and above all in his attention to landscape, particularly in the extensive sunrise and sunset settings in the Triptych of the Virgin of Montserrat and the Pietà. Bermejo's distinctive style had a considerable influence, particularly in Aragon, where it was widely disseminated in the prolific studio of Martín Bernat. No one at this time, however, could duplicate his landscapes.

There are three surviving works that incorporate the artist's name within the compositions, still unusual in Spanish painting of this period: Saint Michael with Kneeling Donor, Antonio Juan; the Triptych of the Virgin of Montserrat with Donor, Francesco della Chiesa; and the Pietà with Canon Desplà. The first two bear the artist's name on simulated parchment, and the last is found in an inscription on the frame. Indirect evidence also speaks of royal patronage, for an Epiphany, now in the Royal Chapel of Granada, which was part of the personal collection of Queen Isabella I of Castile.

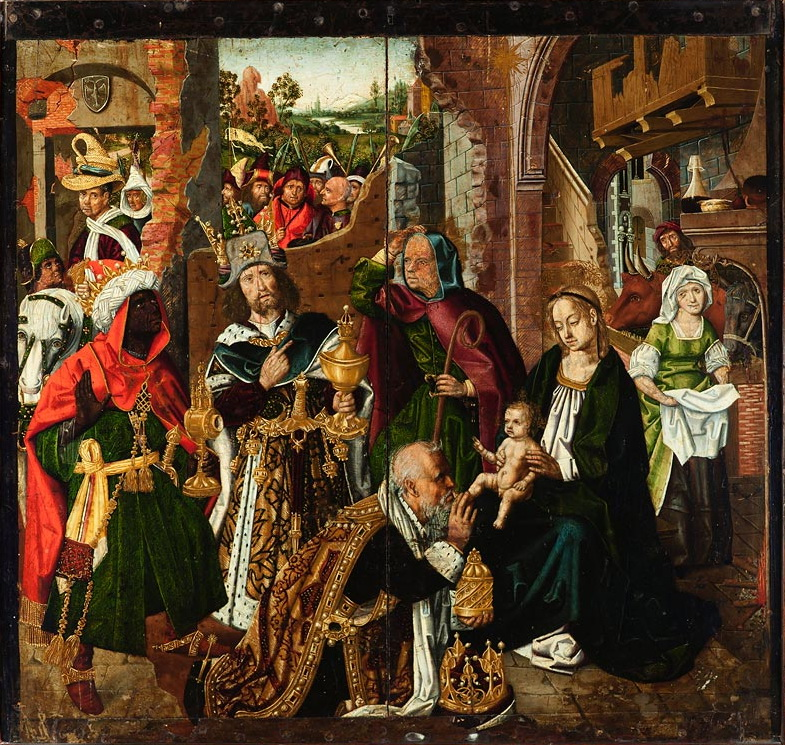
Epiphany, 1480, a depiction of the Adoration of the Magi, Royal Chapel of Granada

== Works ==
In 2019, it was believed that fewer than 20 of his works are known.

Amongst the best known are:

- Central panel from the Saint Michael Triumphs over the Devil (c. 1468), National Gallery, London
- Central panel from the Altarpiece of St. Dominic of Silos (1474–1477), Museo del Prado, Madrid (central panel)
- Altarpiece of St. Engracia (c. 1476), Boston, Isabella Stewart Gardner Museum, San Diego Museum of Art, Bilbao, Bilbao Fine Arts Museum, collegiate church, Daroca, Spain
- Altarpiece of the Virgin of Montserrat (c. 1485), Acqui Terme Cathedral, Italy
- Pieta with Canon Lluís Desplà (1490), Barcelona Cathedral
- Saint John the Baptist, Museum of Fine Arts of Seville, Seville, Spain

== Gallery ==
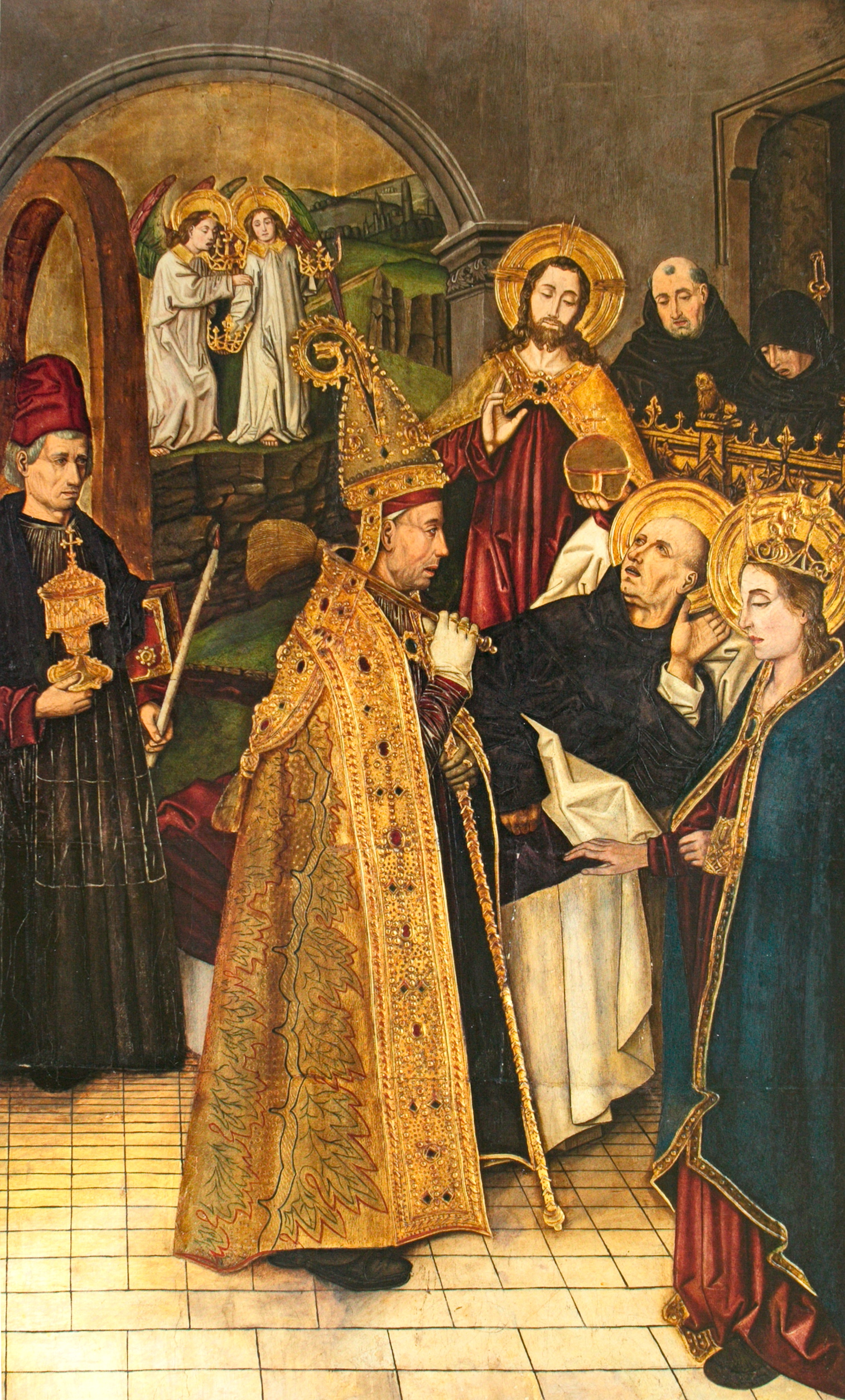
Death of Dominic of Silos by Bartolomé Bermejo and Martín Bernat, from the dismembered Altarpiece of Dominic of Silos (private collection)

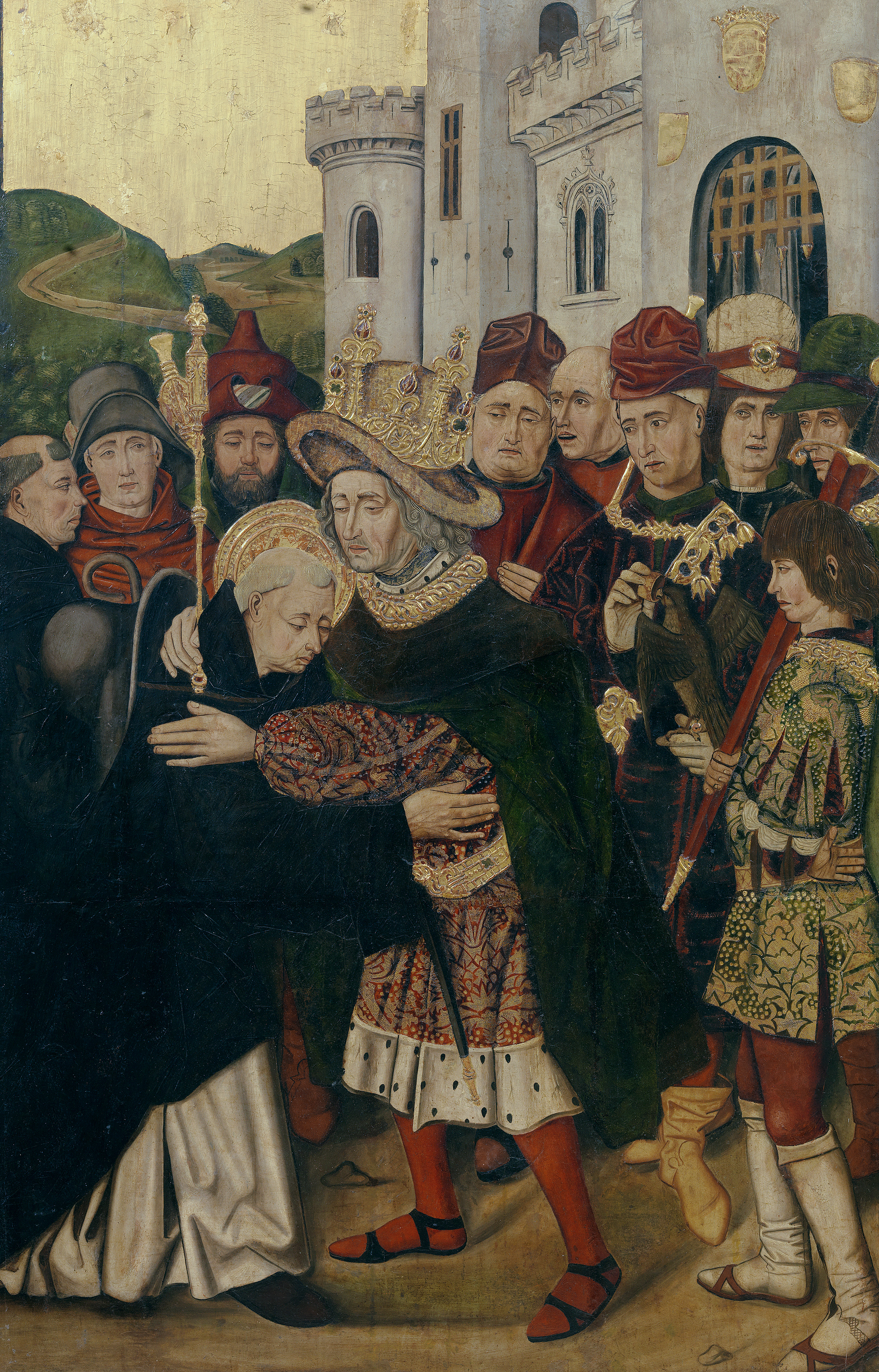
Ferdinand I of Castile welcoming Saint Dominic of Silos by Bartolomé Bermejo and Martín Bernat, from the dismembered Altarpiece of Dominic of Silos (Prado)

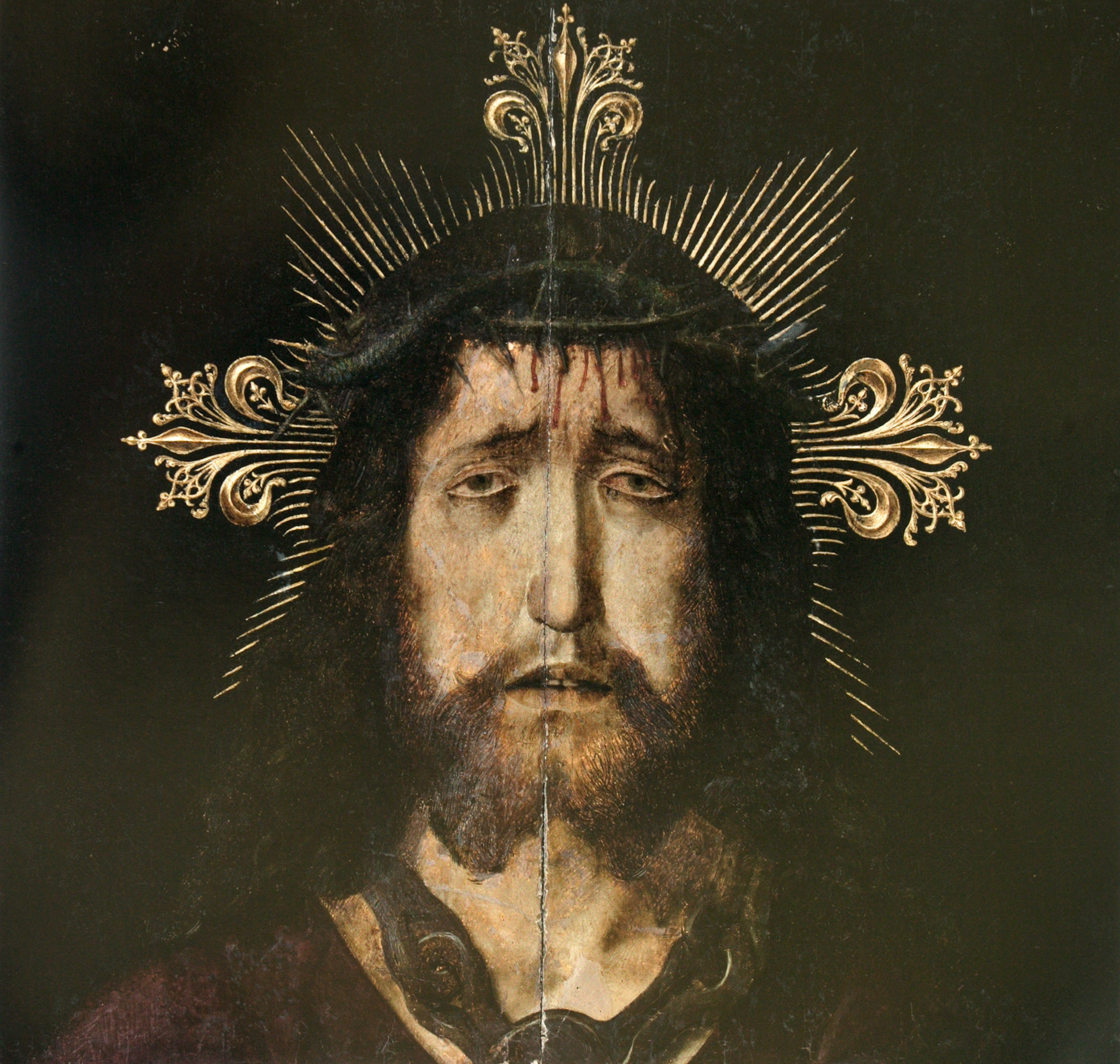
Image of the Holy Face of Jesus, Royal Chapel of Granada

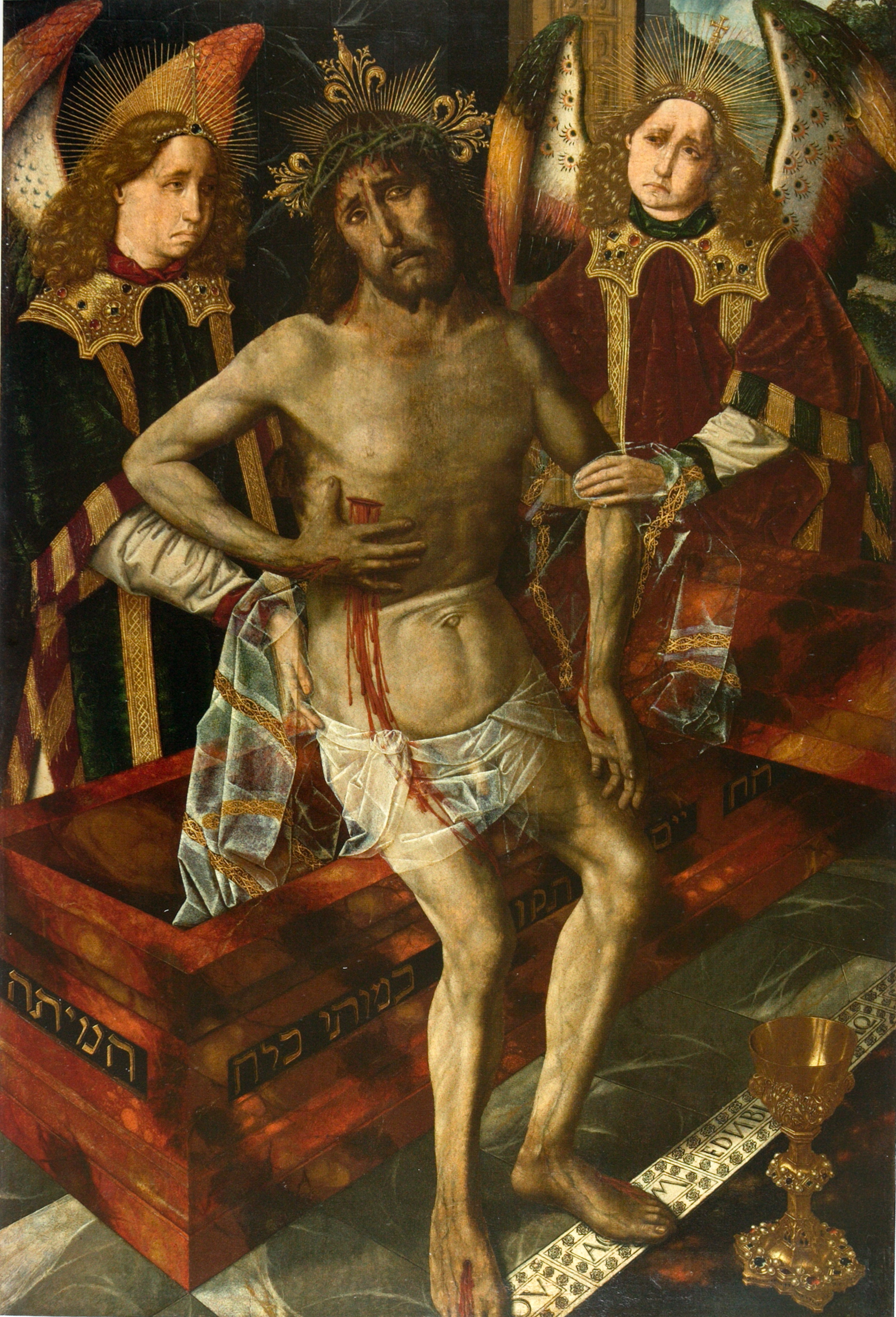
Christ at the Tomb Supported by Two Angels, (1468 - 1474), Peralada Castle

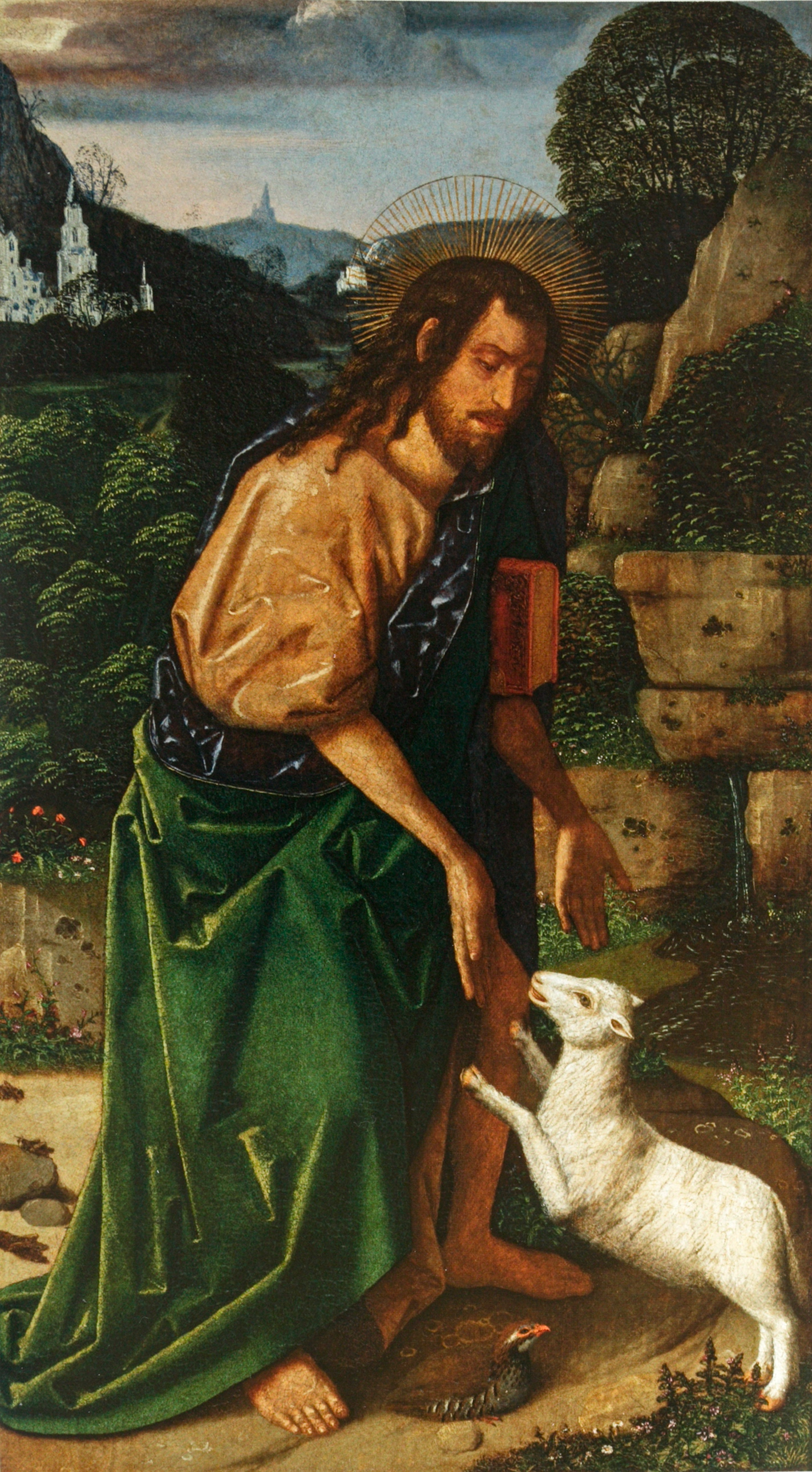
Saint John the Baptist in the desert, 1470 (Seville)

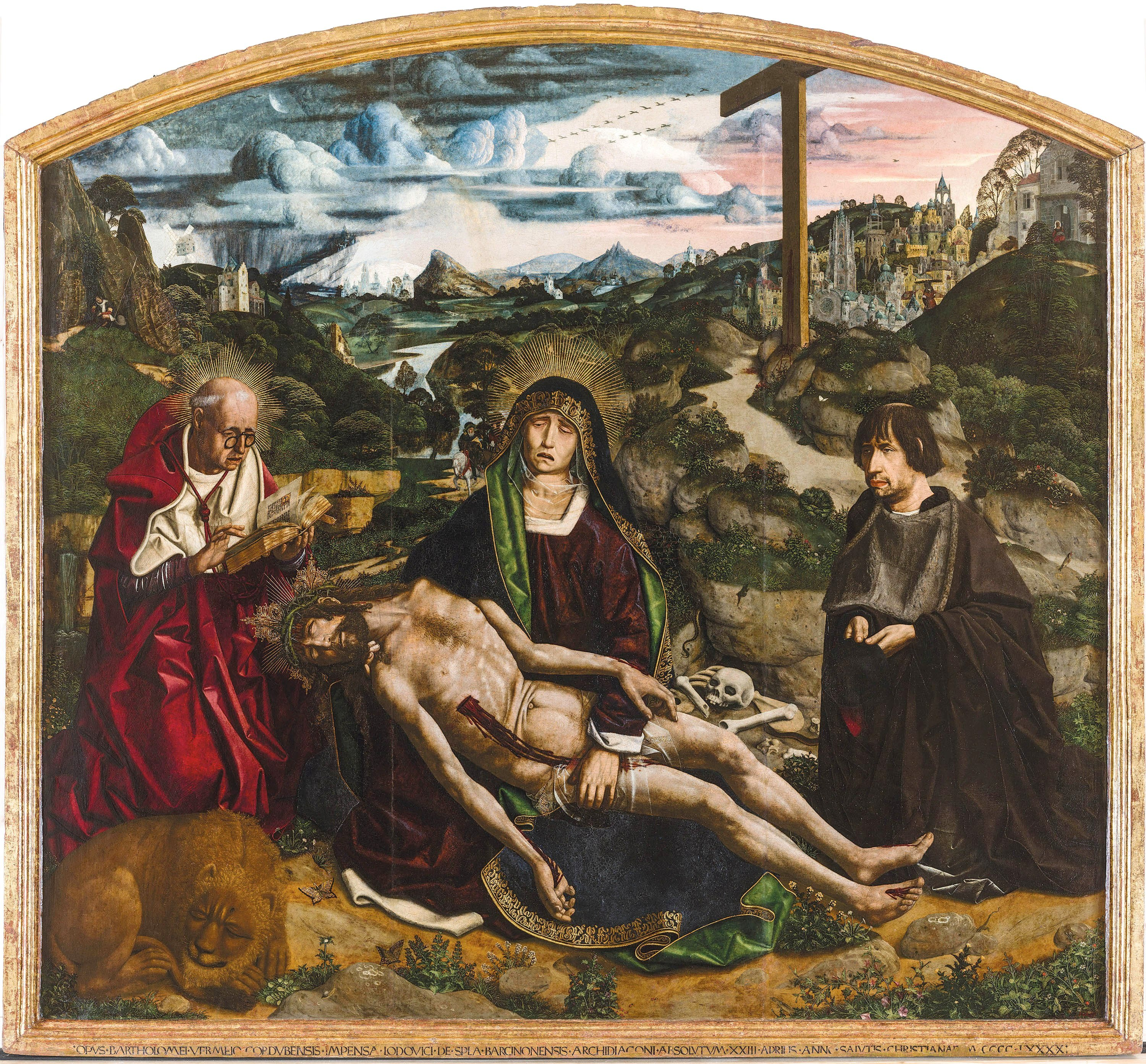
Pieta with Canon Lluís Desplà, 1490 (Barcelona Cathedral)

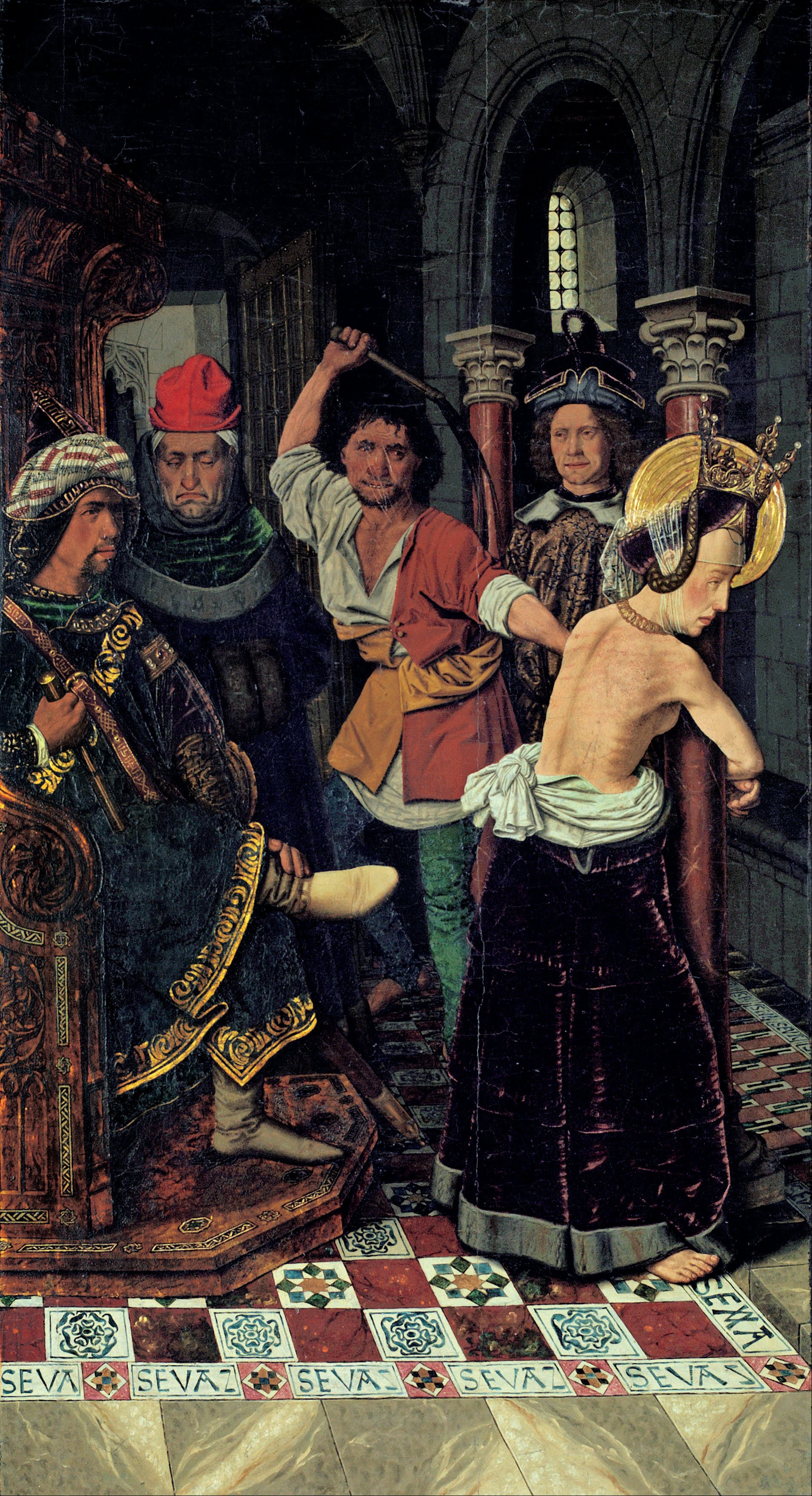
The Flagellation of St Engracia, (1474 - 1478) (Bilbao)

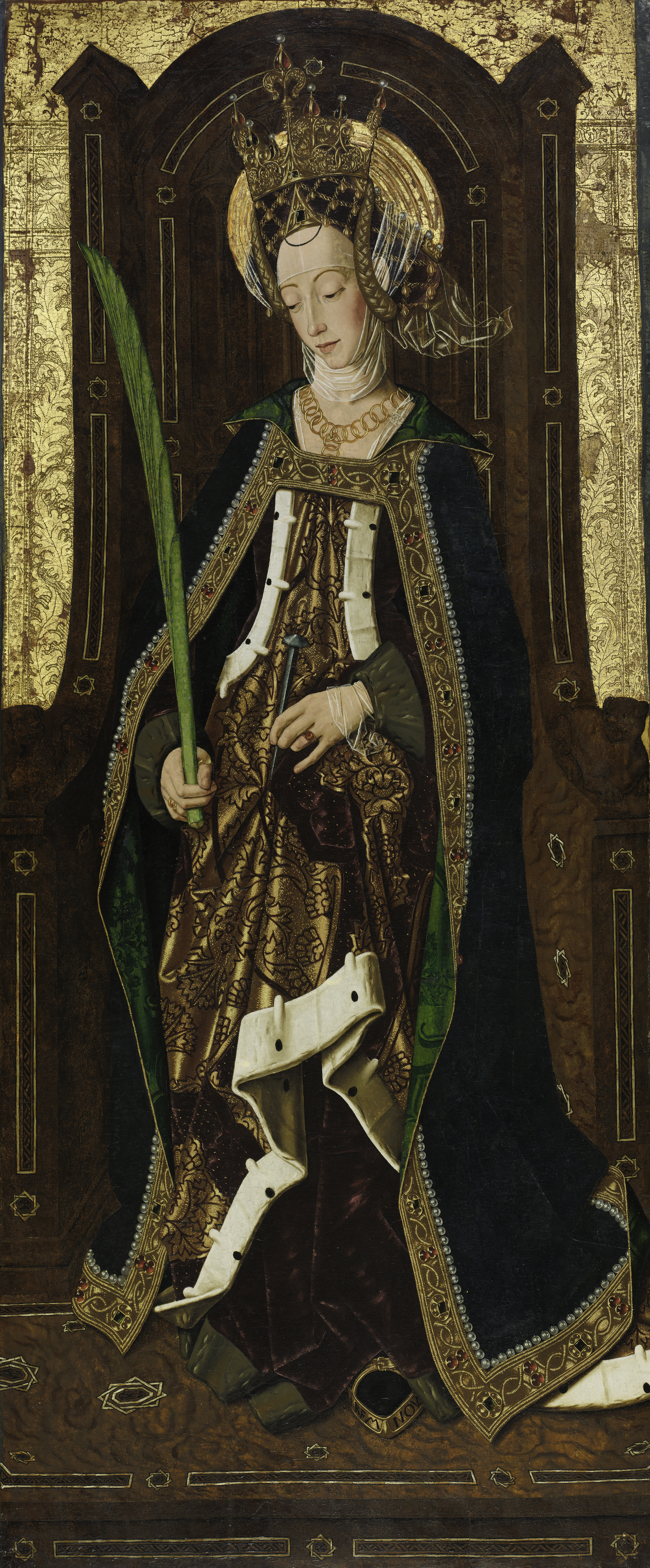
Saint Engratia, 1474 (Gardner Museum, Boston)

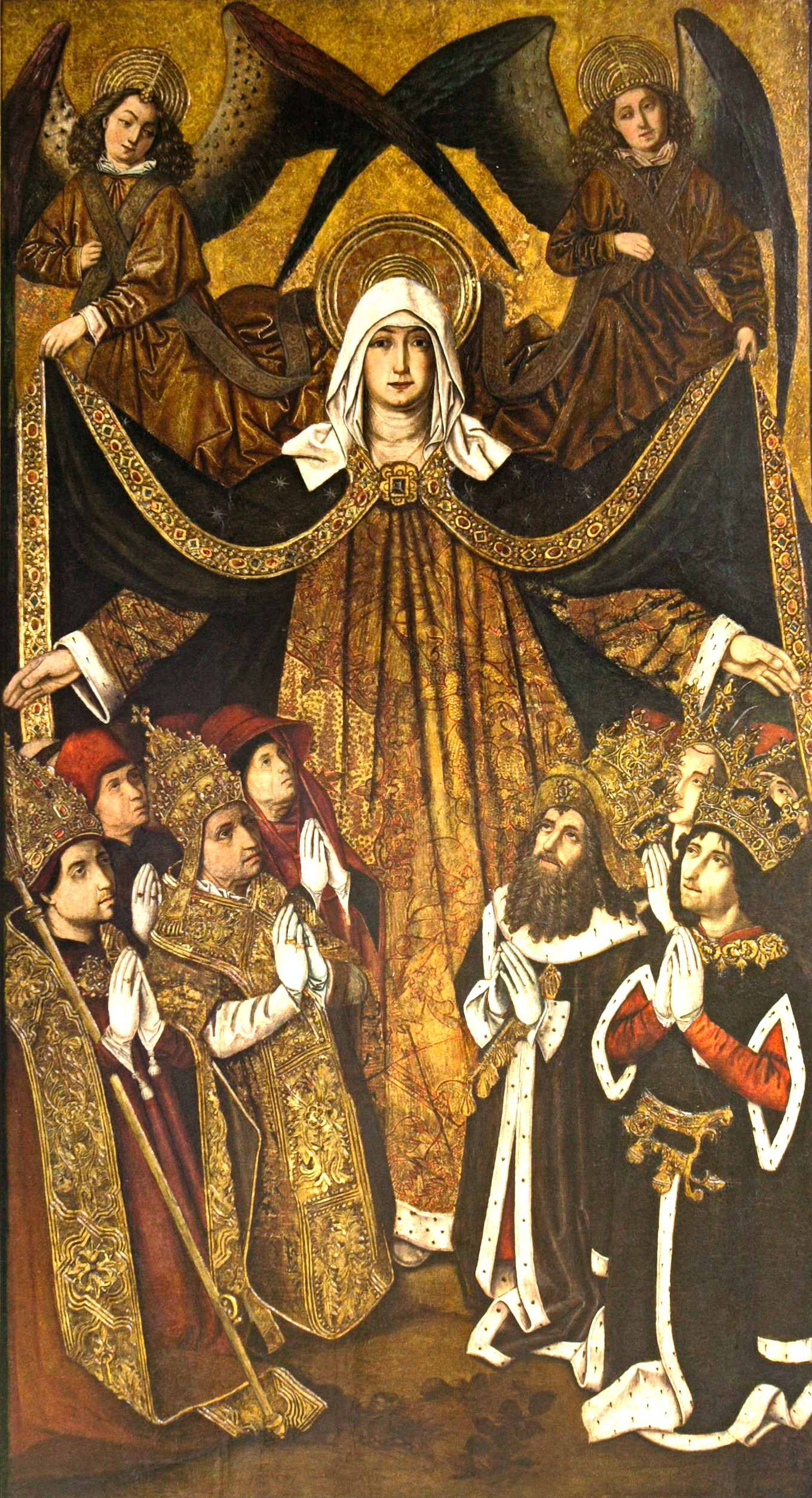
Our Lady of Mercy (Grand Rapids Art Museum)

== Exhibitions ==
The Museo del Prado and the Museu Nacional d'Art de Catalunya organised an exhibition of the painter's work which opened in Madrid in 2018. Versions of the exhibition were shown in Barcelona and London the following year. Paintings on display included Saint Michael Triumphs over the Devil, Desplà Pieta and Triptych of the Virgin of Montserrat.

In 2023 some of Bermejo's work was featured in another temporary exhibition at the Prado called "The lost mirror".
