= Blesa (disambiguation) =

Blesa may mean:

- Blesa, a municipality located in the province of Teruel, Aragon, Spain.
- Blesa Formation, geological formation in Teruel and La Rioja, Spain
- Miguel Blesa (1947-2017), Spanish banker
- Bluetooth Low Energy Spoofing Attack (BLESA), a security vulnerability in most devices equipped with Bluetooth Low Energy, running some of the following software stacks: BlueZ on Linux, Fluoride on Android, and the iOS BLE stack on iOS and iPadOS 13.3 and earlier.
