= Dominic of Silos =

Spanish monk (1000–1073)

Saint Dominic of Silos OSB
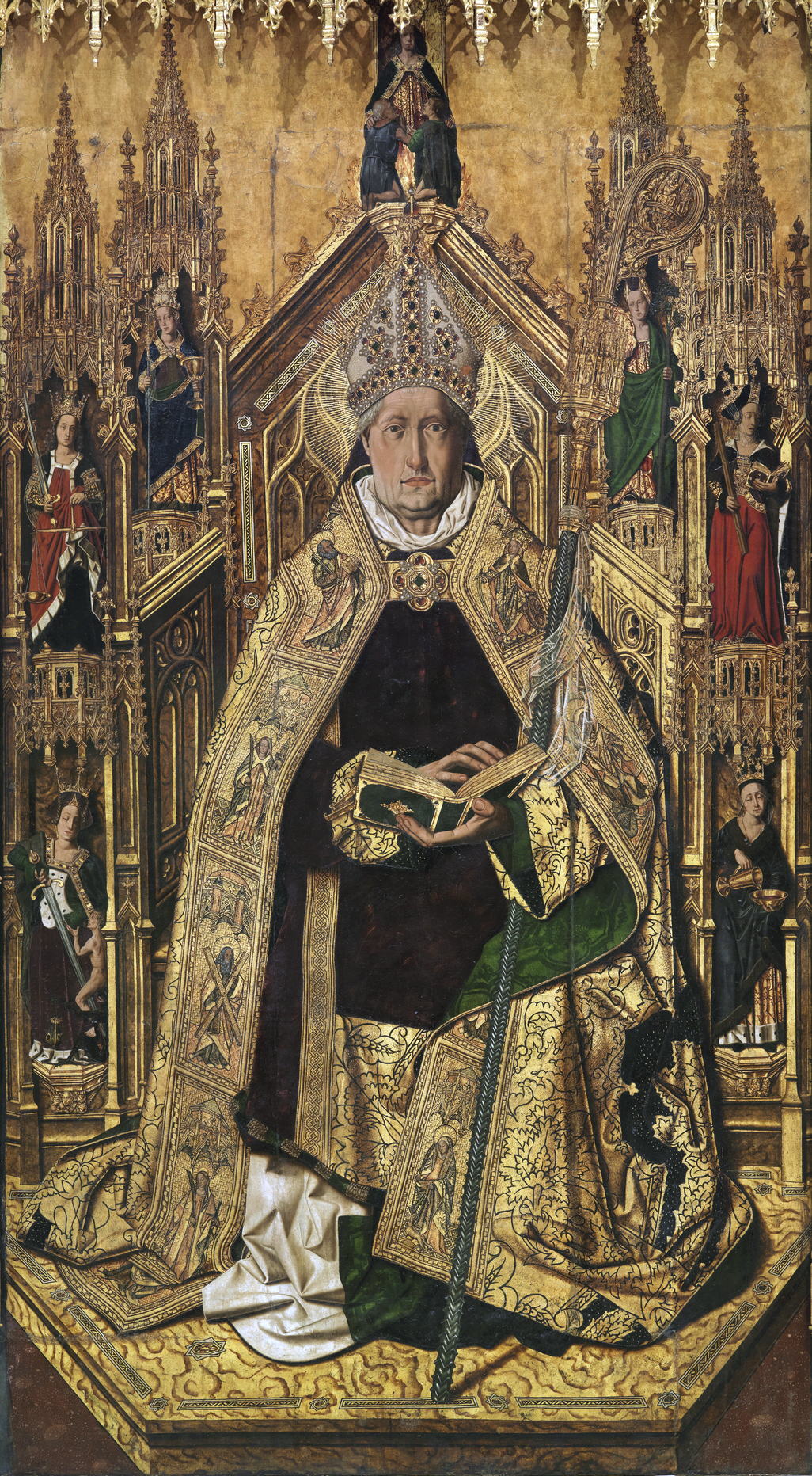
- Saint Dominic enthroned as Abbot by Bartolomé Bermejo (15th century)

Abbot
- Born: 1000; Cañas, Kingdom of Najera, (modern-day La Rioja, Spain)
- Died: 20 December 1073 (aged 72–73); Silos, Kingdom of Castile
- Venerated in: Roman Catholic Church
- Major shrine: Abbey of Santo Domingo de Silos; Santo Domingo de Silos, Spain
- Feast: 20 December
- Attributes: Abbot surrounded by the Seven Virtues; mitred abbot enthroned with a book, a veil tied to his crozier, as proper to an abbot
- Patronage: Against rabies; against rabid dogs; against insects; captives; pregnant women; prisoners; shepherds

Dominic of Silos OSB (Spanish: Santo Domingo de Silos) (1000 – 20 December 1073) was a Spanish monk, to whom the Abbey of Santo Domingo de Silos, where he served as the abbot, is dedicated. He is revered as a saint in the Catholic Church. His feast day is 20 December.

== Life ==
Born in Cañas, La Rioja, to a family of peasants, he worked as a shepherd before becoming a Benedictine monk at the Monasteries of San Millán de la Cogolla. He was ordained a priest and soon became master of novices and then prior, before being driven out with two of his fellow monks by King García Sánchez III of Navarre, for opposing his intention to annex the monastery's lands.

Under the protection of King Ferdinand I of León, in 1041, they found refuge in the town of Silos at the decaying Abbey of St. Sebastian, occupied by only six monks. (After his death, both the monastery and the town were renamed for him.) Dominic was appointed abbot of the community and, inspired by the reforms of Cluny, rebuilt the monastery, both spiritually and physically. He built the cloisters in the Romanesque style. He established a scriptorium, turning the monastery into a center of book design, scholarship, and significant charity supported by the proceeds of the gold and silver workshop. Dominic became known for works of healing. The monastery became one of the centers of the Mozarabic liturgy, and also preserved the Visigothic script of ancient Spain.

Wealthy patrons endowed the monastery, and Dominic raised funds to ransom Christians taken prisoner by the Moors. By the time of his death, on 20 December 1073, the monastery numbered forty monks.

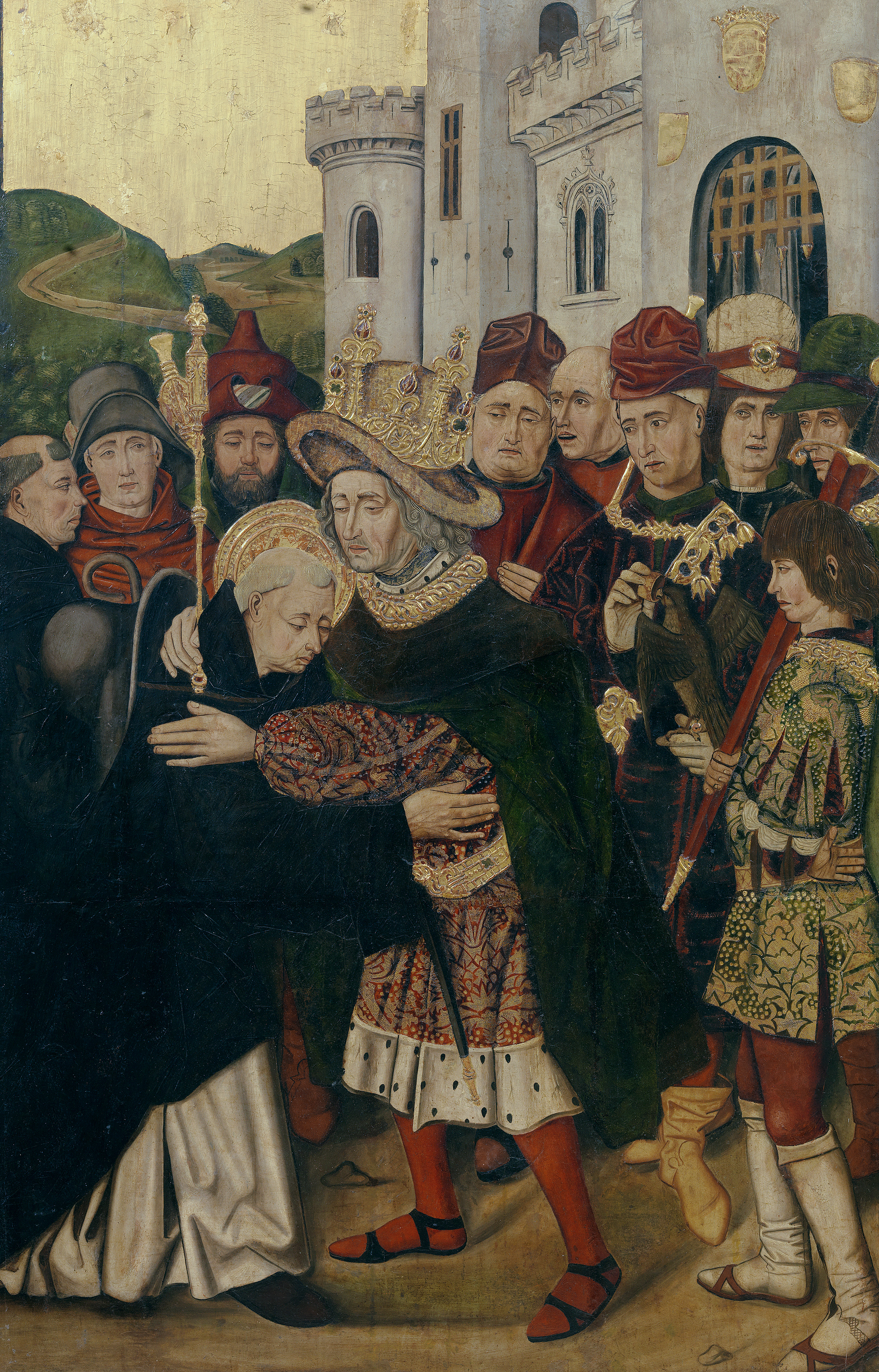
Ferdinand welcomes Domingo de Silos by Martín Bernat and Bartolomé Bermejo, 1477-79

== Veneration ==
Dominic's relics were translated to the monastery church on 5 January 1076. Churches and monasteries were dedicated to him as early as 1085. His annual feast day is celebrated on 20 December.

=== Patronage ===
The mother of the better-known Saint Dominic of Guzmán, the Blessed Joan of Aza, is said to have prayed at his shrine before she was able to conceive the son she named for him. That son would grow up to found the Dominican Order. Dominic's special patronage thus became connected with pregnancy, and until the establishment of the Second Spanish Republic in 1931, his abbatial crozier was used to bless the queens of Spain, and was placed by their beds when they were in labor.

St. Dominic of Silos is the patron saint of prisoners, pregnant women, and shepherds.

== Legacy ==
The noted 13th-century priest and poet, Gonzalo de Berceo, wrote an account of his life.

In the 19th century, Silos became a monastery in the Benedictine Congregation of Solesmes, and is notable for its fine double Romanesque cloisters, extensive library, and recordings of Gregorian chant.

== See also ==
- Saint Dominic of Silos, patron saint archive
