= Pieta with Canon Lluís Desplà =

1490 painting by Bartolomé Bermejo

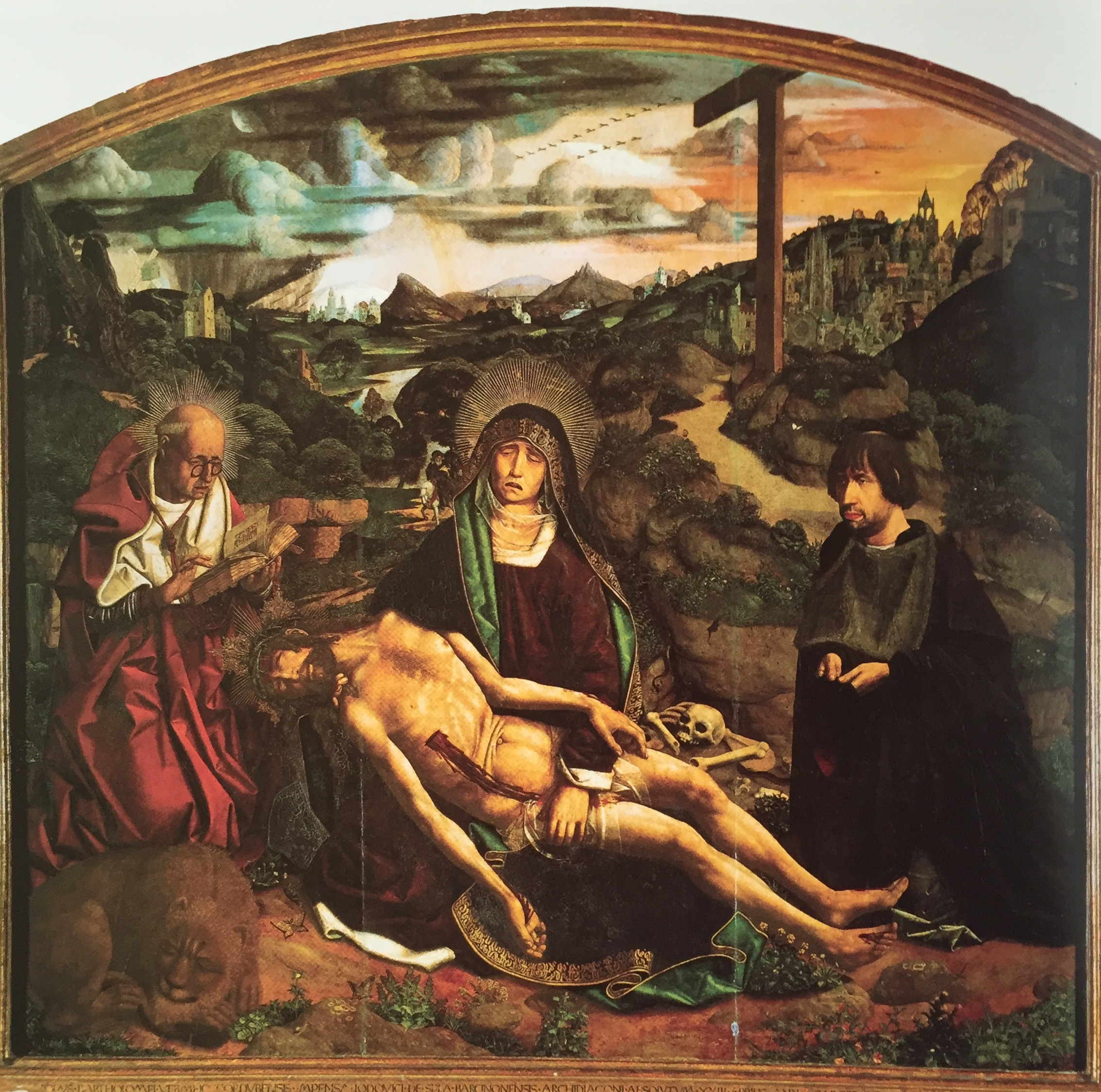
- Artist: Bartolomé Bermejo
- Year: 1490
- Medium: Tempera on wood
- Location: Barcelona Cathedral, Barcelona

The Pieta with Canon Lluís Desplà is a Renaissance painting of 1490 by the Spanish artist Bartolomé Bermejo, which is characterized by naturalism and influences from Early Netherlandish painting. It depicts a pietá (literally "pity", piedad in Spanish), the scene in which the Virgin Mary mourns over the body of her son, Jesus Christ. It shows mountain weather with unusual detail for the period. The painting focuses on the facial expressions of the leading figures, a high level of detail, and has references to other artists' depictions. This painting panel was commissioned for the donor's private oratory. This painting is the last work by Bermejo to be finished before he stopped working and eventually vanished from the record. It is now in Barcelona Cathedral.

A painted Latin inscription on the bottom of the frame records the donor and the date of 1490.

== Description ==
Bermejo uses an illusionistic language by creating a sense of capturing reality and sensory representation. Bermejo distinguished his subject matters with a series of Spanish artisanal techniques and depicts each object with bright colors, transparency, polished gloss, gleaming metal, and splendid stone, gold, and silver materials. This showcases how Bermejo applies detail to his work in depth using the Flemish oil glaze technique. The Pieta is painted on three wooden panels. Bermejo signed his painting with an inscription in all capital letters in a classic manner to evoke antique Latin inscriptions. This shows Bermejo's interest in ancient Roman culture. The edges of Mary's mantle have the embedded texture of gold patterns, and the angle perspective of the robe is portrayed as actual fabric. This shows the detailed way that Bermejo applies detail to his work using the Flemish oil glaze technique.

=== Crucial figures ===
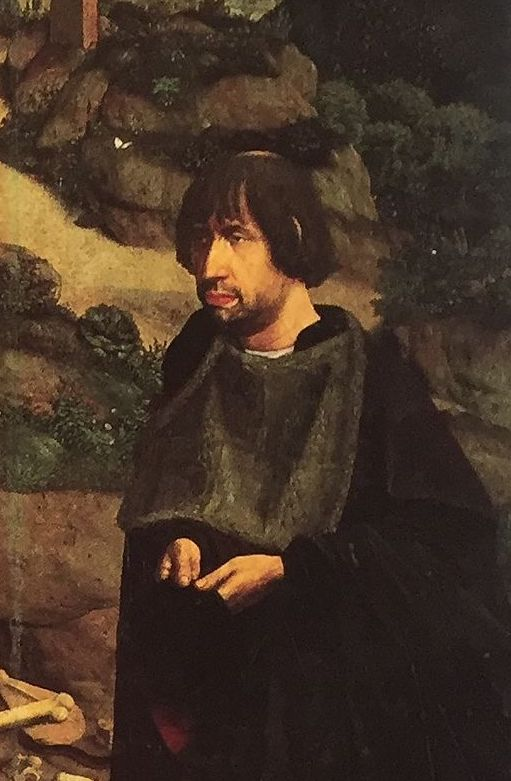
Desplà kneels next to Mary and Christ.

Two figures, Saint Jerome and Canon Liuís Desplà, who to the sides of Virgin Mary and the dead Jesus, who are the central focus. Jerome is a cardinal who wears a red and white robe and reads through the bible (he was the translator of the standard Latin Vulgate text) while kneeling to the side of the dead Christ. Below Jerome, Bermejo included Jerome's usual symbol and companion, a lion, which in his legend Jerome had tamed in the wildness. Canon Desplà is an archdeacon wearing thick dark robes, who held an influential position in Barcelona. Desplà was fascinated by Bermejo's Flemish techniques and works of art and became a personal client. Desplà requested Bermejo to include a portrait of him as a participant in the Christian drama of the Pieta scene. Desplà intended to portray and publicize his position as an archdeacon to demonstrate his piety by kneeling on the right side along the Virgin Mary and the death of Christ by showing his devoutness and remorse within the scene. Also, he wanted to be in the same scene as Jerome, one of the scholarly Doctors of the Church. Bermejo does not idealize Desplà; he paints the archdeacon with sagging skin under his eyes.

The three leading figures in the foreground (Jesus, Mary, and Jerome), Bermejo have detailed facial expressions. Jerome looks sad while going through the bible. Jesus gives a breathless look after his final moments living on earth. The unique saddened expression of the Virgin Mary shows a good display of her half-closed eyes, slightly parted lips, and downward curved corners of her mouth. The haloes on their heads symbolize their holy devotion. Bermejo included two types of gold rays: Jesus and St. Jerome have star-shaped gold rays, while the Virgin Mary has circular gold rays.

=== Landscape ===
The sky background has several unique weather effects that give a more natural appearance of the sun setting over Jerusalem and the landscape environment. He applied distinctive details of wind-torn and stormy clouds, flickering light sources, and flocks of birds well. He distinguishes the dark stormy clouds from a passage in the gospels that describes Jesus's death and the possible coming of the eclipse.

The same applies to the landscape, visualizing all living animals, insects, mountains, valleys, and other towns and plants' life subject matter with highly detailed depictions. Within the landscape of the Pieta, the painting has dramatic elements to give a contrasting meaning to the environment and subject matters that Bermejo has embedded into the scene. Bermejo depicted Jerusalem as having Gothic architecture.

The scene includes two small details within the background landscape. On the left, a hermit sits at the entrance of a mountain cave. On the right, a woman is seated with her spinning wheel in her stone house in Jerusalem. Both of them have their unique visual details. The hermit's side is represented by the uneven thickness of parallel strokes of the brush, while the woman's side shows interesting domestic architectural details of the bricks and plaster.

=== References ===
Often Bermejo borrows from northern works of art such as Jan van Eyck’s Mystic Lamb and Hans Memling’s The Life and Passion of Christ. Van Eyck's Portraits focuses on landscapes, plants, and townspeople. In comparison, Memling’s painting has a different focus, portraying the visual details and architectural structure of Jerusalem with the massive number of people in every area and showing Christ exiting while carrying the cross on his shoulder. Bermejo embedded both artists’ styles in his portrait of the Pieta to illustrate his ideal scene of the environment to which other artists inspired him.
