= Francisco de Osona =

Spanish painter

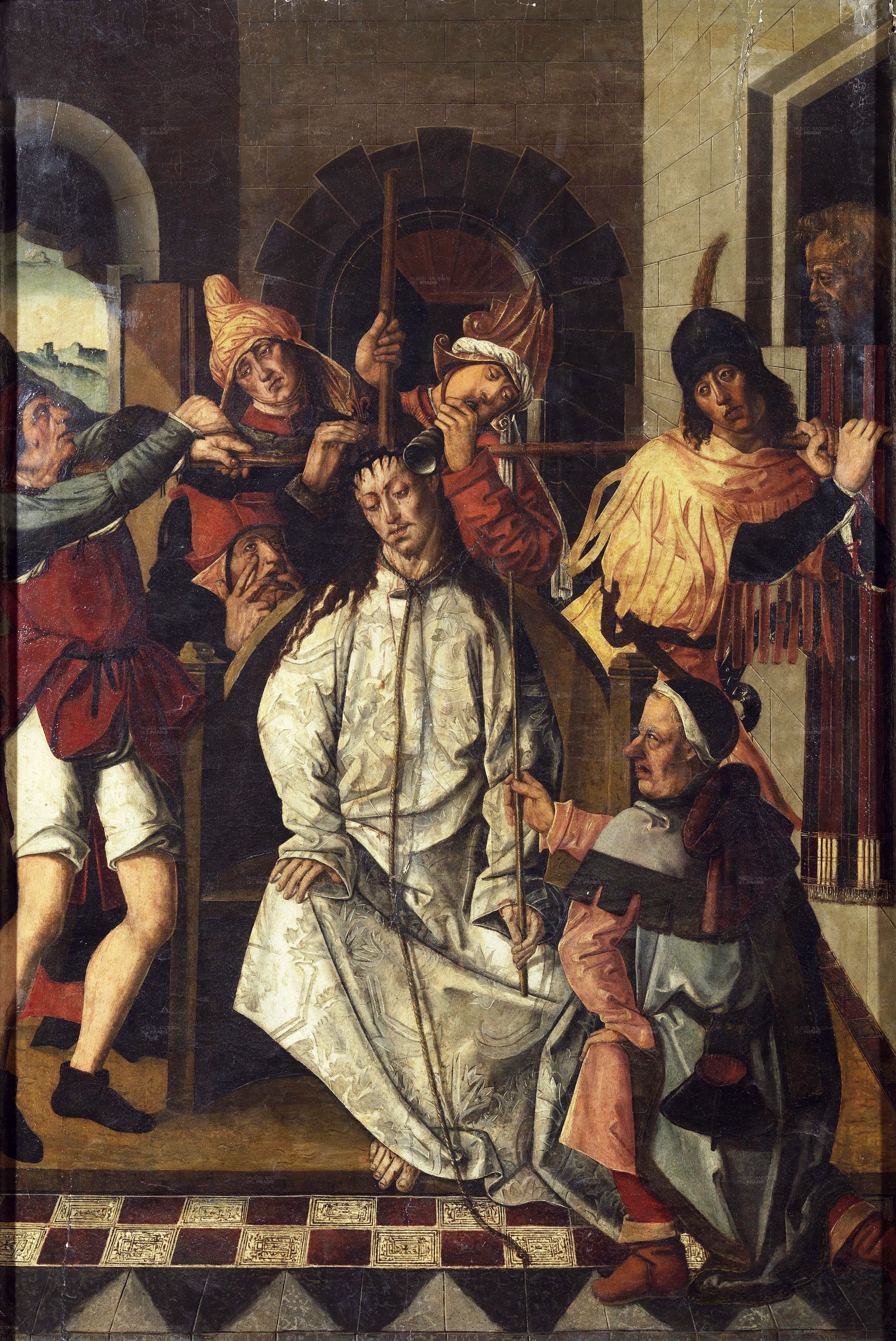
Crowning with Thorns by Francisco and Rodrigo de Osona, basilica of Museo del Prado, 1500

Francisco de Osona, also Francisco de Osona the Younger, (c.1465–c.1514) was a Spanish Renaissance painter.

Francisco was born in Valencia. There has been some confusion between Francisco and his father Rodrigo de Osona. Father and son worked closely together in their workshop in Valencia, therefore works are often attributed to both, although some assumptions are made that Francisco was more open to what was newer styles and forms in Italy. However, while the activity of Rodrigo ended with his death in 1518, Francisco died before him much younger in 1514. The second table of the Epiphany, preserved in London, is signed by "The teacher's son Rodrigo", in which, on the contrary, there seems to have more traditional trend seen in the works of the father. Francisco has been credited with Christ before Pilate in the Museu de Belles Arts de València, as well as The Adoration of the Magi in the Victoria and Albert Museum. The work of two Osona artists, along with Paolo de San Leocadio, form the basis for Spanish classicism in painting.
