= Blesa =

- municipality
- Coat of arms

- Location within Spain
- Coordinates: 41°3′N 0°53′W
- Country: Spain
- Autonomous community: Aragon
- Province: Teruel

Area
  - Total: 80 km^{2} (31 sq mi)
- Elevation: 711 m (2,333 ft)

Population (2025-01-01)
  - Total: 74
  - Density: 0.93/km^{2} (2.4/sq mi)
- Time zone: UTC+1 (CET)
  - Summer (DST): UTC+2 (CEST)

Blesa is a municipality located in the province of Teruel, Aragon, Spain. According to the 2004 census (INE), the municipality has a population of 142 inhabitants.

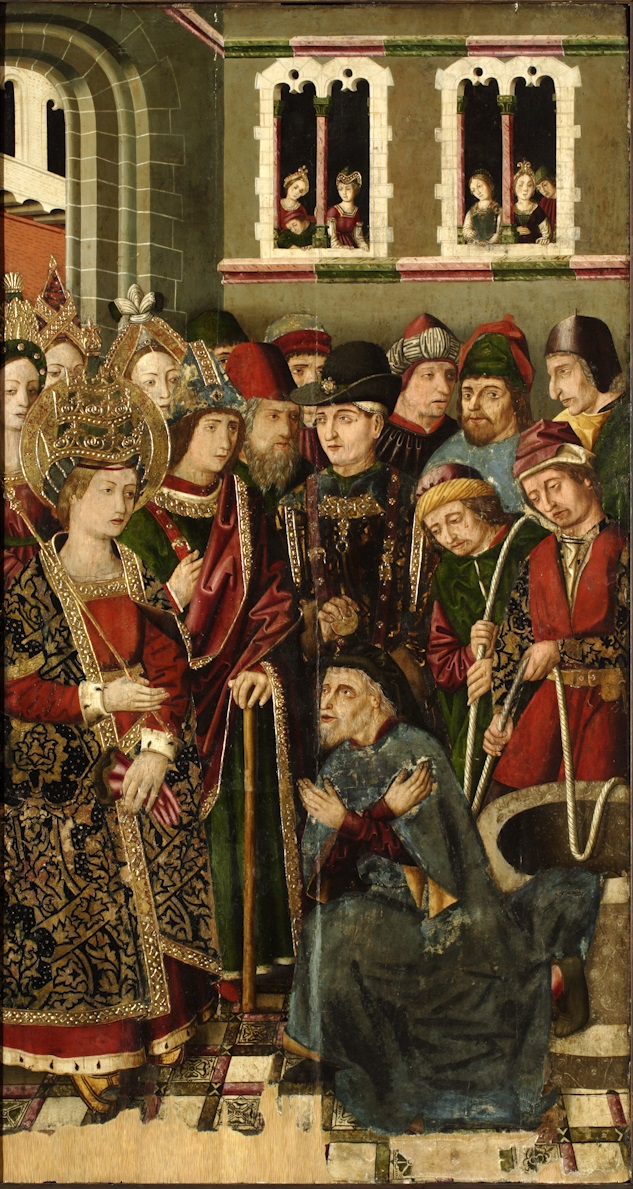
Retable from Blesa, currently in Art museum of Saragossa

== See also ==
- List of municipalities in Teruel
