= Rodrigo de Osona =

Spanish painter

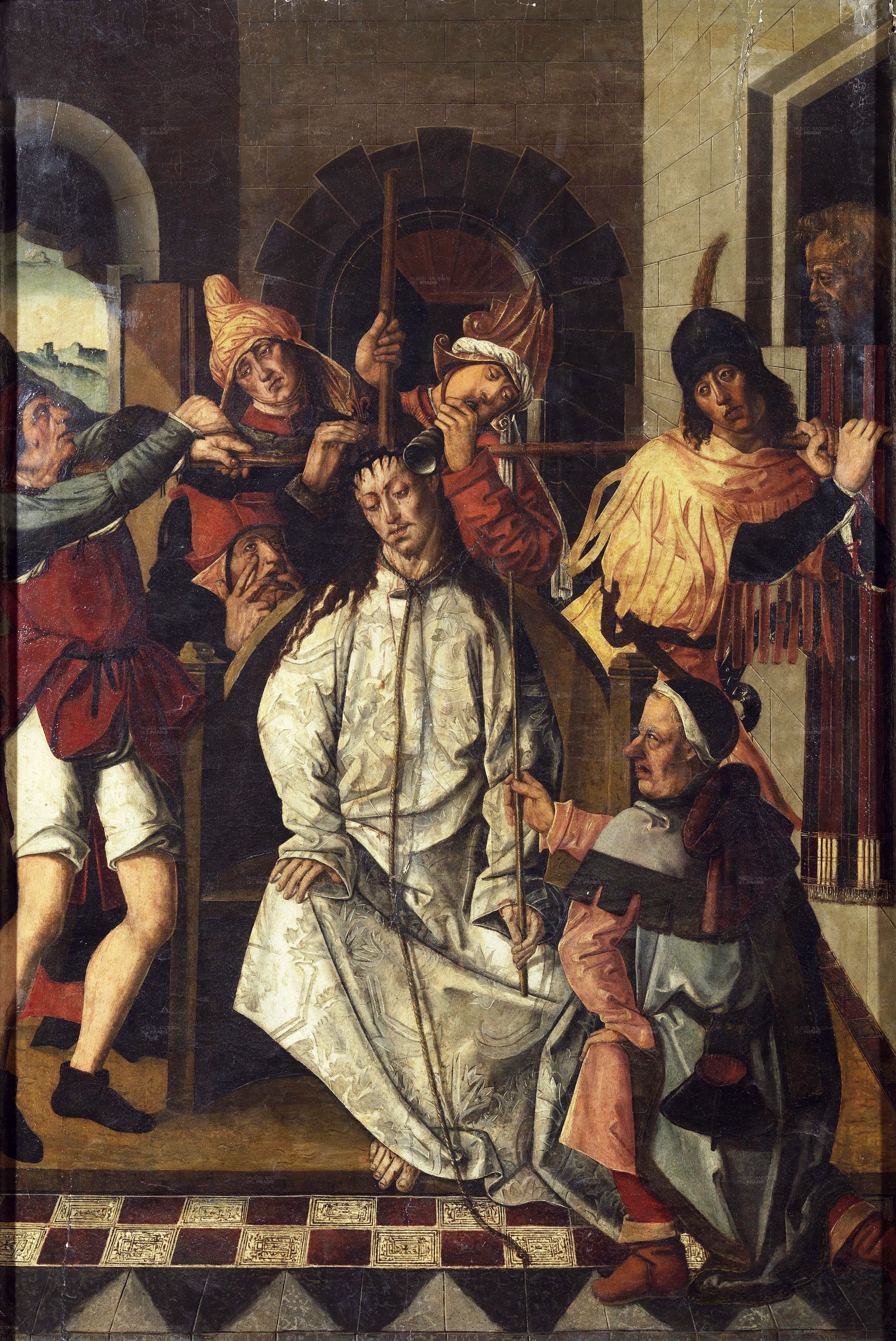
Crowning with Thorns by Rodrigo and Francisco de Osona, basilica of Museo del Prado, 1500

Rodrigo de Osona, also Rodrigo de Osona the Elder, (c.1440–c.1518) was a Spanish Renaissance painter.

== Early work ==
His initial period of training may have taken place in Ferrara, Padua and Venice. He may have also had a stay in Italy. His works include the altarpiece of Calvary church of San Nicolas de Valencia, signed in 1476 and through which they have been able to attribute other works like the Pietà, now in the Museu de Belles Arts de València, and performed between 1485 and 1490.

== Son ==
There has been some confusion between Rodrigo and his son Francisco de Osona. Father and son worked closely together in their workshop in Valencia, therefore works are often attributed to both, although some assumptions are made that Francisco was more open to what was newer styles and forms in Italy. However, while the activity of Rodrigo ended with his death in 1518, Francisco died before him much younger in 1514. The second table of the Epiphany, preserved in London, is signed by "The teacher's son Rodrigo", in which, on the contrary, there seems to have more traditional trend seen in the works of the father.

== Legacy ==
With basic art training, Rodrigo is considered one of the initiators of Renaissance forms in Spanish painting, coming to a full sense of quattrocento italiano. However, the Italian influences are colored by the knowledge and apply their own formulas of Flemish painting, such as remote expressiveness of idealization. Aspects of kindness and gentleness cater more devotional type reasons that a streamlined and rigorous view of reality. However, his paintings show a concern for the natural and architectural setting of the scenes and superb mastery of oil painting. The work of the father and son artist team, along with Paolo de San Leocadio, form the basis for Spanish classicism in painting.
