= Baccalario =

Baccalario is an Italian surname. Notable people with the surname include:

- Angelo Baccalario (1852–?), Italian painter of landscapes
- Pierdomenico Baccalario (born 1974), Italian author of children's and young adult fiction
