= Giulietto Chiesa =

Italian politician (1940–2020)

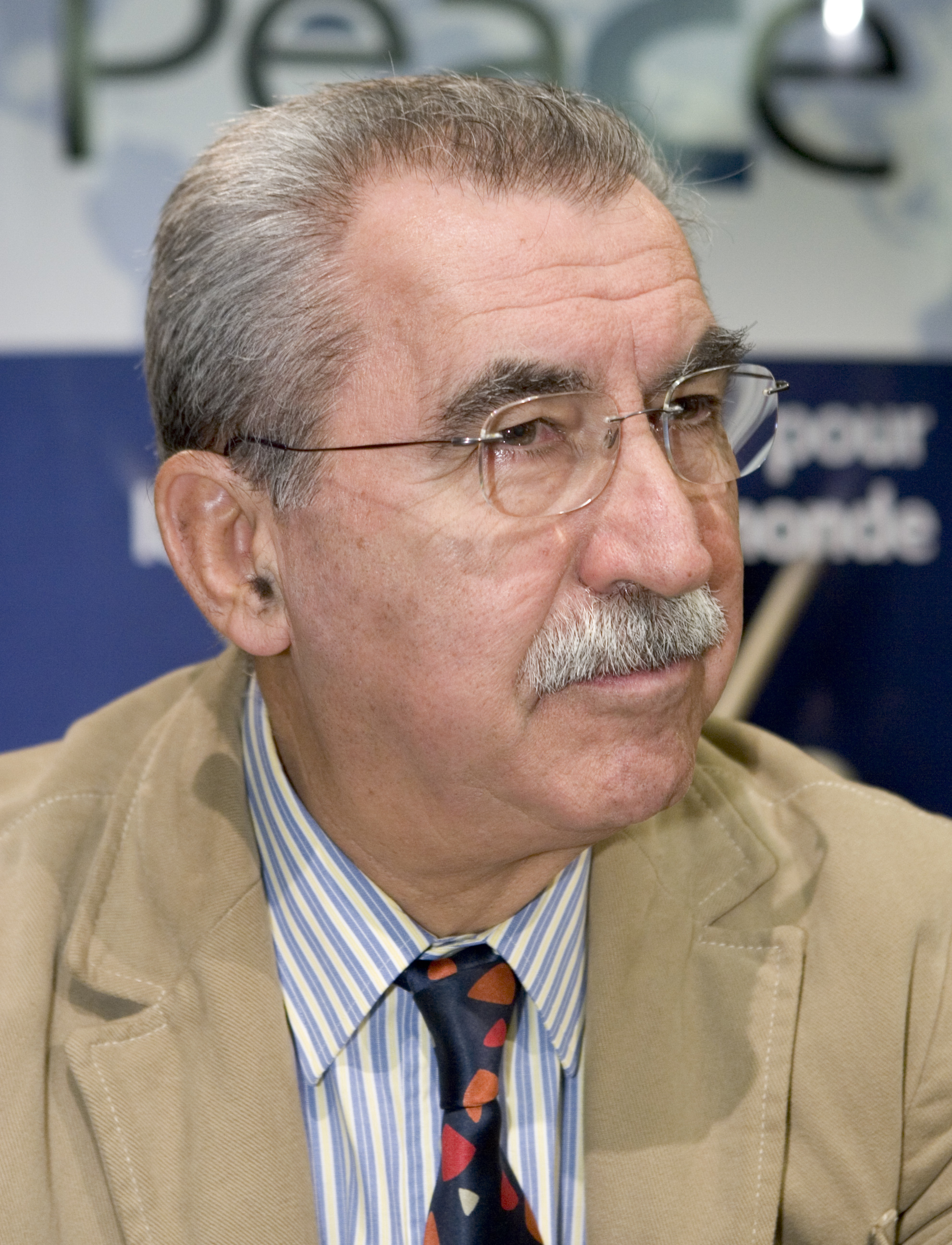
- Giulietto Chiesa, 2005

Member of the European Parliament
- In office 20 July 2004 – 13 July 2009
- Constituency: North-West Italy

Personal details
- Born: 4 September 1940 Acqui Terme, Kingdom of Italy
- Died: 26 April 2020 (aged 79) Rome, Italy
- Party: PCI (1967–1991); IdV (2003–2006)
- Height: 1.72 m (5 ft 8 in)
- Spouse: Fiammetta Cucurnia
- Children: 1
- Profession: Journalist, politician
- Awards: Order of Friendship (South Ossetia, 2018)
- Website: giuliettochiesa.globalist.it

Giulietto Chiesa (Italian pronunciation: [dʒuˈljetto ˈkjɛːza]; 4 September 1940 – 26 April 2020) was an Italian journalist, author, lecturer and Russophile politician. He was Vice-President of the European Parliament Committee on International Trade and a member of two Extraordinary Committees inside the European Parliament: the Extraordinary Renditions Committee and the Climate Change Committee. He was the founder of the cultural association Megachip. Democracy in Communications. He was the Chief Editor of the web TV Pandora TV.

== Early life and education ==
Chiesa was born in Acqui Terme on 4 September 1940. He was enrolled at the University of Genoa as a physics student, but he did not finish his studies. In 1989–1990, he was Fellow at the Kennan Institute for Advanced Russian Studies, Washington.

== Career ==
=== Political activism ===
Chiesa had long experience as a political activist. He started in Genoa as a local branch leader of a student organisation, called Unione Goliardica Italiana (Italian Goliardic Union – UGI) and then as its national Vice-President. Later on he became national leader of FGCI (Italian Communist Youth Federation) and eventually leader of the Genoese branch of PCI (Italian Communist Party) between 1970 and 1979. He was chairman of the PCI in the county council of Genoa between 1975 and 1979, the year in which he left his career as a party official in order to be a journalist.

=== Journalistic activities and lectures ===
Chiesa began his career as a journalist in 1979, first as an editor for the Italian communist newspaper L'Unità and then serving as a Moscow correspondent for the same newspaper from 1980. He gave lectures in fifteen universities and research institutes in the US, at the State Department and at the RAND Corporation. In 1991, he was again appointed Moscow correspondent for La Stampa, a newspaper based in Turin, and as such he remained in Russia until the end of 2000. While in Moscow he was connected with Radio Liberty. He continued working as a political editorialist and commentator for La Stampa until 2005. In the same period, he wrote for Il manifesto and other Italian newspapers and magazines contributing columns to La Voce delle voci and Missioni della consolata. He worked with several European, American and Russian newspapers and journals. During the 1990s, he worked with most of the Italian television stations, with Swiss Radio International, with Vatican Radio, with the Russian channel of the BBC World Service, with the Russian TV outlets Channel One Russia (ORT), Russia-1 (RTR) and NTV and with Deutsche Welle. He was invited to participate to RAI News 24 and other RAI programmes. He was repeatedly invited to Omnibus, a TV program on the Italian TV channel La Sette. He wrote a regular column for Photo and for four years wrote a regular column for the European monthly magazine Galatea

For several years, he wrote a regular column on Kompania, a Russian weekly magazine for business circles. He wrote several books, ranging from history to news and reportages about the Soviet Union and Russia. His first book, though, harks back to his first months as a journalist in Italy. It is an accurate reconstruction of the events describing the failed attempt to rescue the hostages from the American embassy in Tehran, Operazione Teheran (Operation Tehran, 1980). Afterwards, from Moscow, he wrote L’URSS che cambia (The Changing USSR, 1987) together with Roy Medvedev, at the time a Russian political dissident. In 1990, it was published – in the form of a dialogue with Medvedev – La rivoluzione di Gorbaciov, edited in the US with the title Time of Change.

At about the same time, in Italy, Transizione alla Democrazia was published (Transition to Democracy). A new edition of Transition to Democracy was published in 1991 in the USA - with the collaboration of Douglas Northrop - and afterwards in Russia. Another two books followed - the first was Cronaca del Golpe Rosso (Chronicle of the Red Coup, 1991) and the other one was Da Mosca, Cronaca di un colpo di stato annunciato (From Moscow. Chronicle of a Coup Foretold 1995). Another two books about Russian events were published: Russia Addio ( Goodbye Russia, 1997), the Russian edition Proschaj Rossija reportedly sold over 80,000 copies, and Russian Roulette which as Russkaja Ruletka, was published in Russia in July 2000.

=== Megachip and Zero ===
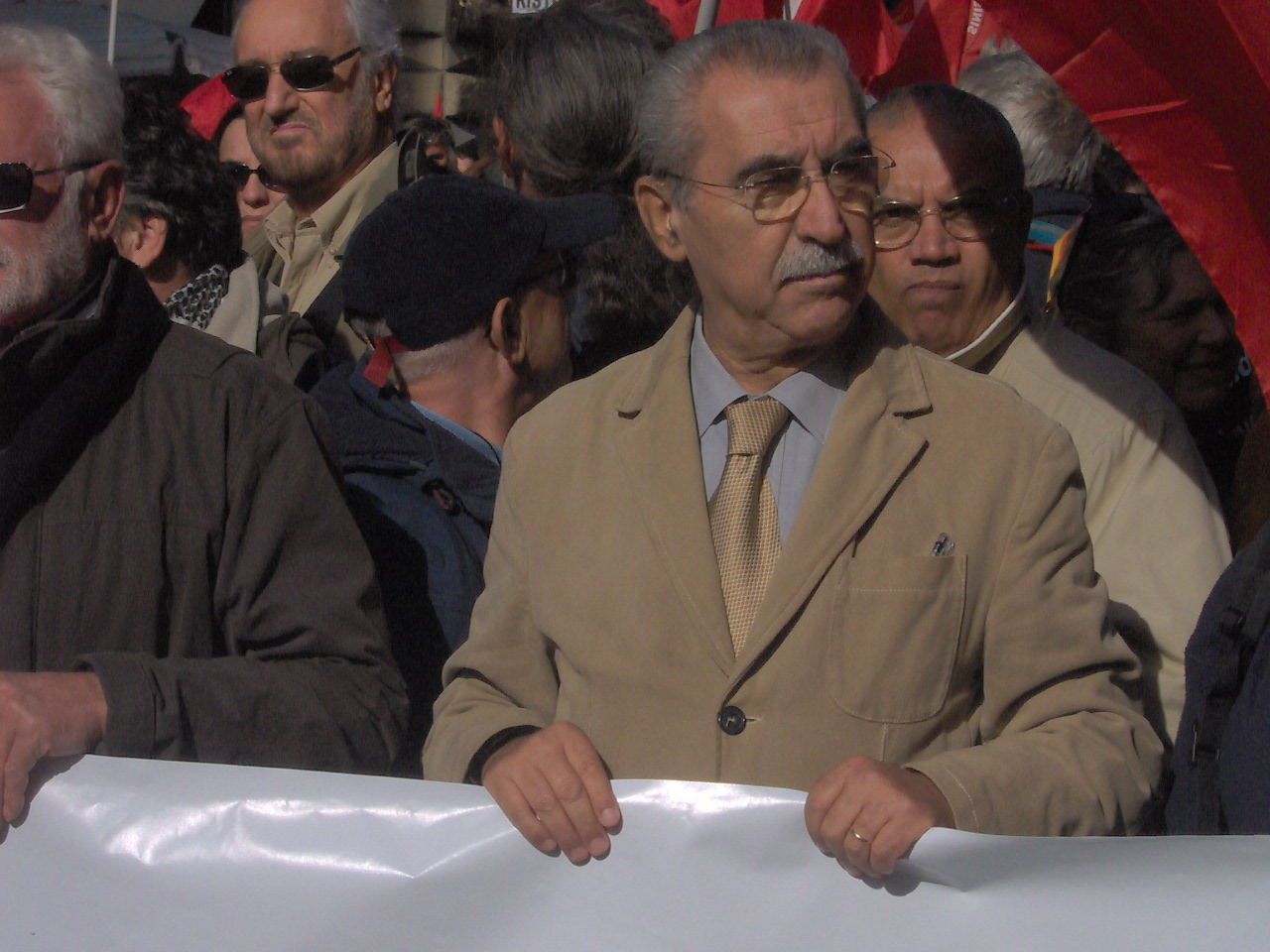
Chiesa during a rally in 2007

In 1999–2000, Chiesa founded Megachip – Democracy in Communications, an association which deals with the critical analysis of how the mainstream media works. Furthermore, the association created a website in order to deepen the analysis of the subjects covered (www.megachip.info). From Megachip other cultural projects sprang, such as a programme of Education to the media, the movie Zero: an Investigation into 9/11 and the quarterly magazine Cometa (Comunicazione-Etica-Ambiente Communications-Ethics–Environment).

From the latter part of the 1990s, Chiesa began to consider the issues raised by globalization, in particular, how it affects the media. In this context, Giulietto Chiesa was involved in the foundation of the World Political Forum, based in Turin and chaired by Mikhail Gorbachev. In 2010, Gorbachev carried on his activities about international research, founding in Luxemburg the New Policy Forum, of whose Advisory Board Giulietto Chiesa was a member. Chiesa published essays on these issues with Italian and foreign journals. Among them, two essays are derived from the lectures held at the Academy of Science and at the institute for Economy and international Relations (IMEMO).

Returning to Italy after his period as a correspondent in Moscow for La Stampa, he wrote other books as well as dozens of essays gathered in collections co-authored by him and others. His chronicle of the events that happened during the G8 in Genoa was published with the title G8/Genova (G8/Genoa, 2001). In the same year, Afghanistan Year Zero was published, a book co-written with the journalist and satirical cartoonist Vauro and presenting a preface written by Gino Strada, the Italian surgeon who founded Emergency. This last book remained for one year at the top of the best-selling lists with over 115,000 copies sold and it was translated into Greek. In Spring 2002, La Guerra Infinita was launched which remained for a long time at the top of the non-fiction charts. It was translated into German, English and Spanish.

In March 2003 Superclan was published, a book co-written by him and Marcello Villari. In Moscow - in 2003 as well – was launched Beskonechnaja Voina, a collection of essays which includes parts from Afghanistan Year Zero, The Infinite War and Superclan. At the beginning of 2004 La Guerra come Menzogna (War as a Lie) was published, which has been translated into French. The essay Invece di questa sinistra (Instead of This Left) was also published, which includes the political manifesto of Mr Chiesa for the European election campaign of 2004.

On the verge of the Iraq War he promoted – together with a large group of volunteering journalists – the experimental project of an independent satellite TV, called NoWar TV.

In 2004, Giulietto Chiesa was elected to the European Parliament elections as a member from the Italy of Values list of Di Pietro-Occhetto-Civil Society. At a later time, due to the incompatibility between his worldview and Di Pietro's, he left the parliamentary group of Liberals and Democrats – which he had joined at the request of Di Pietro - to join instead the PSE group (Party of European Socialists) as an independent member. In Italy he created the group Cantiere per il Bene Comune (Construction of the Common Good) together with Achille Occhetto, Paolo Sylos Labini, Elio Veltri, Antonello Falomi and Diego Novelli.

In October 2004 I peggiori crimini del comunismo (The Worst Crimes of Communism) was published, co-written by Chiesa and the cartoonist Vauro, a biting satire which reveals the leftist past of some of the closest associates of the current Prime Minister of the time, Silvio Berlusconi.

In 2005, a book of interviews was issued, edited by Massimo Panarari, entitled Cronache Marxziane (Marxian Chronicles), translated a year later into Russian with the title Vostok-Zapad:Voinà Imperii. In the same year, a collection of essays was published called Prima della tempesta (Before the Storm).

In 2007, Chiesa produced two volumes: Le Carceri segrete della CIA in Europa (The Secret Prisons of CIA on EU soil) - co-authored by him and two of his closest collaborators, Francesco De Carlo and Giovanni Melogli – and Zero: Why the Official Version About 9/11 is a Fraud, co-authored by him and many other writers and edited by another of his collaborators, Roberto Vignoli. The contributions of Chiesa to this collection are the Introduction and a long essay on geopolitics called Europa, perché Marte ha sconfitto Venere (Europe: Why Mars Defeated Venus). In October 2007, the Movie Zero: inchiesta sull'11 settembre (Zero: An Investigation into 9/11) was presented at the International Movie Festival of Rome. It was created by a group - promoted by Giulietto Chiesa - led by Paolo Jormi Bianchi and was directed by Franco Fracassi and Francesco Trento. It began to be distributed from the beginning of 2008. Following a version of the "inside job" 9/11 conspiracy theory, it suggests that officials inside and outside the US Government were directly involved in planning and executing the attacks. In an interview with Press TV, Chiesa stated that the attacks involved a calculated conspiracy implicating US, Israeli, Pakistani and Saudi secret services. On 12 September 2008, Zero was broadcast by Russian Channel 1 television, achieving an extraordinary success in terms of audience. Over thirty million people watched the movie. The movie was deeply debunked in the book "Zerobubbole" (in Italian) by a group by Italian and international experts. The book is freely available on the Internet.

For a few years, Chiesa collaborated with Limes, an Italian journal of geopolitics, and with Russian journals, such as Literaturnaja Gazeta, Delovoi Vtornik, Moskovskie Novosti, Itogi. He was a political commentator for Russia Today. In later years, he contributed to other Russian television channels, such as Russia-24, REN TV, Zvezda, and Kultura.

=== 2008 Russian-Georgian Conflict ===
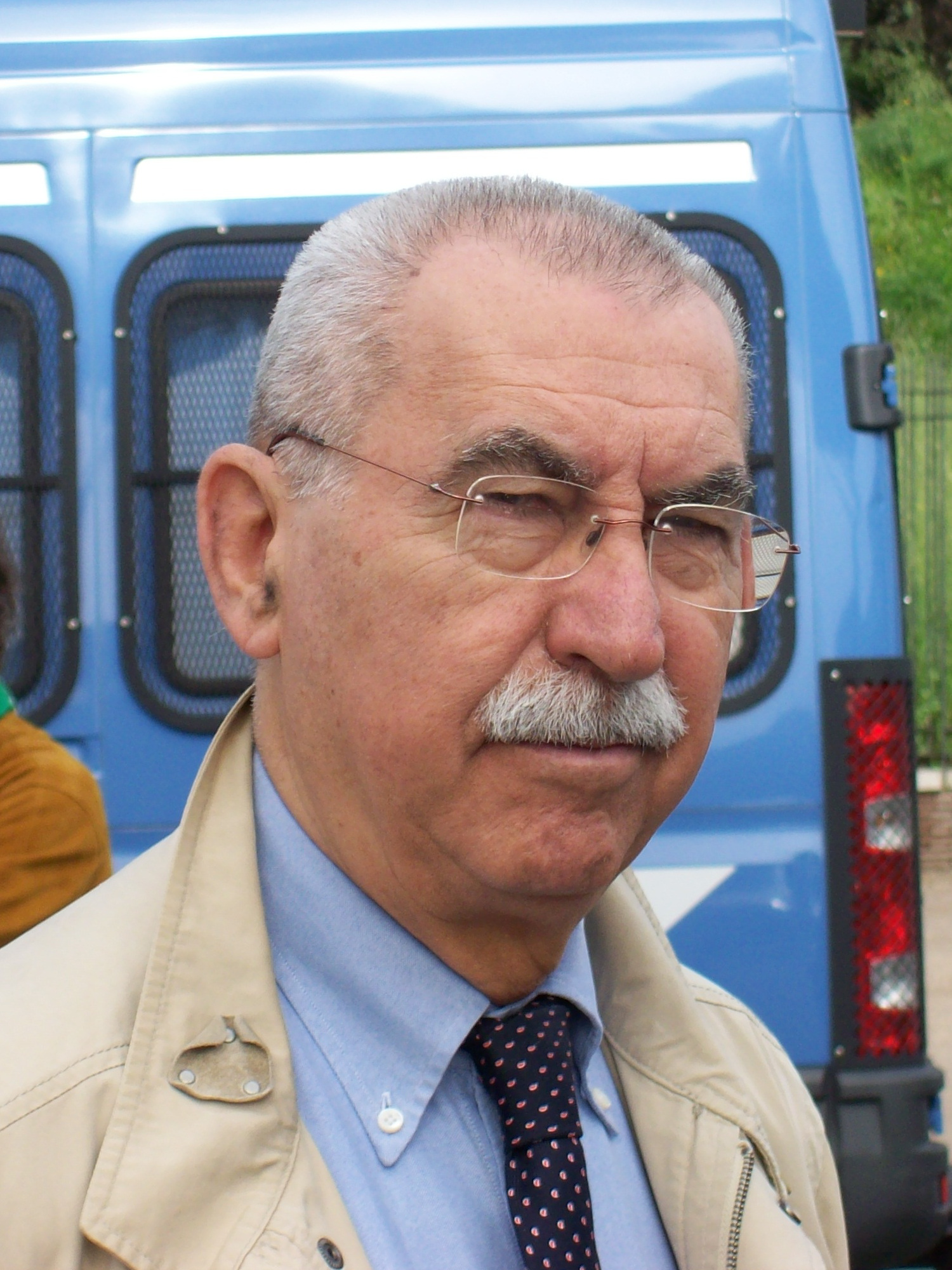
Chiesa in 2013

Concerning the 2008 war between Russia and Georgia, Chiesa stated that "Russia did precisely what had to be done". He added "I think Europe is partly responsible for this war, by unconditionally supporting Georgia’s president Mikheil Saakashvili and his claims on South Ossetia and Abkhazia". Regarding media coverage of the war, Chiesa claimed that "the information given by the media is shameful for the West. Western news channels broadcast images and headlines that were politically biased. Some of them claimed that Russia wanted to conquer Georgia, although no evidence whatsoever backed up that argument. Mikheil Saakashvili was portrayed as the unfortunate victim of Big Bad Putin and very often images of Tskhinvali razed by bombs were not shown. It is the worst coverage I have ever seen since the war in Iraq".

=== Pandora TV ===
During the last months of 2008, Chiesa, together with a large group of journalists, writers and intellectuals linked to Megachip, created the experimental project Pandora TV, a multi-platform television channel funded by its own viewers (www.pandoratv.it).

In April 2009, he was a candidate for the European Parliament elections in Latvia for the Party For Human Rights in United Latvia.

In 2010, he produced two books, one called La Menzogna Nucleare (The Nuclear Lie), co-written with the physicist Guido Cosenza and the eco-physicist Luigi Sertorio. In the autumn, the same publisher launched Il Candidato Lettone, Inedite avventure di un alieno in Europa (The Latvian Candidate. Unusual Adventures of an Alien in Europe), reportage of the campaign for the elections in Latvia, translated both into Russian and into English. In April 2010, Chiesa founded Alternativa, a laboratory of cultural and political ideas, in Genoa of which he became president.

In 2011 – in commemoration of the ten years after 9/11 - the publisher Piemme issued Zero 2. The Smoking Guns. The volume begins with a large essay focused on new evidence claiming to debunk the "official version" (commonly accepted history) on at least seven points and which were no longer mere questions and clues but instead very detailed indictments. The essay remained at the top of the sales charts for several weeks. In 2011, Barack Obush, co-written with Pino Cabras, was published.

The volume Instead of Catastrophe: Why it is by Now Necessary to Develop an Alternative (2012) is essentially Giulietto Chiesa's political manifesto, a summary of his ideas and of his view on the world crisis. In later years, Chiesa faced the challenge of social networks, which for him meant a radical turning point. At the end of 2014, when he was held in custody in Estonia and then deported, his posts spiked with over 1,300,000 internet viewings. During the major moments of international political crisis, in the course of 2015, indicators quite often counted over 500–700,000 viewings, making Giulietto Chiesa's blog one of the ten most visited Italian political blogs. At the beginning of 2014, Pandora TV began operations.

In the meantime, the Russian edition of Invece della catastrofe was published in 2015, a book of interviews, promoted and edited by Ekaterina Glushikh, now entitled Мир на пороге воины. Also in 2015, a new volume was published, called È arrivata la bufera (The Storm has come) which begins with a preface devoted to the Charlie Hebdo terrorist attack against the staff members of the satirical magazine, entitled I misteri di Parigi (The Mysteries of Paris).

In 2016, the French edition of The Storm has come was released. The book starts with a large preface which alleges there was a double false flag operation including both the Charlie Hebdo attack and the November 13 Paris attack. At the same time, a new book by Chiesa was published, called Russofobie 2.0, which is published simultaneously in Italy (with the title Putinfobia) and in Russia (with the title Руссофобия 2.0).

== Works ==
=== Bibliography ===
- Operazione Teheran (Operation Tehran) (1980). Bari. De Donato.
- L’URSS che cambia (The Changing USSR) (1987). Roma. Editori Riuniti.
- La rivoluzione di Gorbaciov (1989). Co-author Roy Medvedev. Garzanti.
  - American edition: Time of Change (1991). Translation from the Italian by Michael Moore. London-New York. I.B. Tauris & Co.LTD.
  - Japanese edition.
- Transizione alla Democrazia (1990). Roma. Lucarini.
  - American edition: Transition to Democracy: Political Change in the Soviet Union (1991). Co-author Douglas Northrop. University Press of New England.
  - Russian Edition: Perekhod k Democratij (1991). Mezhdunarodnye Otnoshenija.
- Cronaca del Golpe rosso (Chronicle of The Red Coup)(1991). Milan. Baldini & Castoldi.
- Da Mosca. Cronache di un colpo di stato annunciato (From Moscow: Chronicle of a Coup Foretold) (1995). Bari. Laterza.
- Russia Addio (Good Bye Russia) (1997). Roma. Editori Riuniti.
  - Russian edition: Прощай, Россия! (1997). Geja.
  - Chinese edition: (1999) Beijing. Nuova Cina.
  - Greek edition: (2000) Athens. Kastaniotis.
- Roulette russa (1999). Milan. Guerini & Associati.
  - Русская рулетка (2000). Prava Cheloveka.
- G8-Genova (G8-Genoa) (2001). Genoa. Einaudi.
- Afghanistan Anno Zero (Afghanistan Year Zero) (2001) Milan. Guerini & Associati.
  - Greek edition.
- La guerra infinita (2002). Milano. Feltrinelli.
  - German edition: Das Zeitalter des Imperiums (2003). Hamburg. Europaische Verlagsanstalt.
  - English edition: The Infinite War (2003). Translation by Robert Elliot. Yema.
- Superclan (2003). Milan. Feltrinelli.
- Beskonechnaja Voina (2003). Russia. Neizvestnaja Voina.
- La guerra come menzogna (War As a Lie). (2004). Rome. Nottetempo.
  - French edition: (2004). Giveva. Timeli.
- Invece di questa sinistra (Instead of This Left). (2004). Rome. Nottetempo.
- I peggiori crimini del comunismo (The Worst Crimes of Communism). (2004). Milan. Piemme.
- Cronache marxiane (Marxian Chronicles)(2005). Rome. Fazi.
  - Russian edition: Vostok-Zapad:Voinà Imperii(2006). Eksmo.
- Prima della tempesta (Before the Storm).(2006). Rome. Nottetempo.
- Le carceri segrete della Cia in Europa (The Secret Prisons of CIA on EU Soil) (2007). Milan. Piemme.
- Zero. Perché la versione ufficiale sull'11 settembre è un falso (Zero: Why The Official Version About 9/11 is a Fraud) (2007). Milan. Piemme.
- La Menzogna Nucleare (The Nuclear Lie) (2010). Milano. Ponte alle Grazie.
- Il Candidato Lettone. Inedite avventure di un alieno in Europa (2010). Milan. Ponte alle Grazie.
  - English edition: The Latvian Candidate (2010). Tribuna.
  - Russian edition: Латвийский кандидат (2010). Tribuna.
- Zero 2. Le pistole fumanti (Zero 2: The Smoking Guns) (2011). Milan. Piemme.
- Barack Obush (2011) Milan. Ponte all Grazie.
- Invece della catastrofe. Perché costruire un'alternativa è ormai indispensabile (Instead of Catastrophe. Why It Is By Now Necessary to Develop an Alternative) (2012).
  - Russian edition: Что, вместо катастрофа (2014). Tribuna.
- Мир на пороге воины, a book of interviews by Ekaterina Glushik (2015). Завтра.
- È arrivata la bufera (2015). Milan. Piemme.
  - French edition (2016)
- Putinfobia 2.0 (2016). Milan. Piemme.
  - French edition: Russofobie 2.0 (2016). Editions du Cercle.
  - Russian edition: Руссофобия 2.0 (2016). Эксмо.

== Video documentary ==
- ZERO - An Investigation into 9/11. Directed by Franco Fracassi and Francesco Trento, on YouTube (full documentary), 104'.
