= Edizioni Piemme =

Italian publishing company

Coordinates: 45.13217°N 8.44830°E

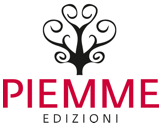
- Parent company: Mondadori Libri S.p.A. of Mondadori group
- Status: Active
- Founded: 1982 in Casale Monferrato, Piedmont, Italy
- Founder: Pietro Marietti
- Country of origin: Italy
- Headquarters location: Segrate (Milan)
- Key people: Pietro Marietti, Elisabetta Dami
- Publication types: Books
- Nonfiction topics: Religion
- Fiction genres: Children’s literature
- Imprints: Il battello a vapore
- Official website: www.edizpiemme.it

Edizioni Piemme, formerly Edizioni Piemme S.p.A., is an Italian book publisher with specialisms in religion and in fiction for children and young adults. It is a division of Mondadori Libri S.p.A. of Mondadori group and was formerly incorporated as a subsidiary. Since October 2003, it has been part of the Mondadori group, which acquired 70% of its equity at a cost of 14.104 million euros. Among its best-known publications are the Ulysses Moore and Century sagas for children by Pierdomenico Baccalario and the works of Khaled Hosseini, author of The Kite Runner.

== History ==
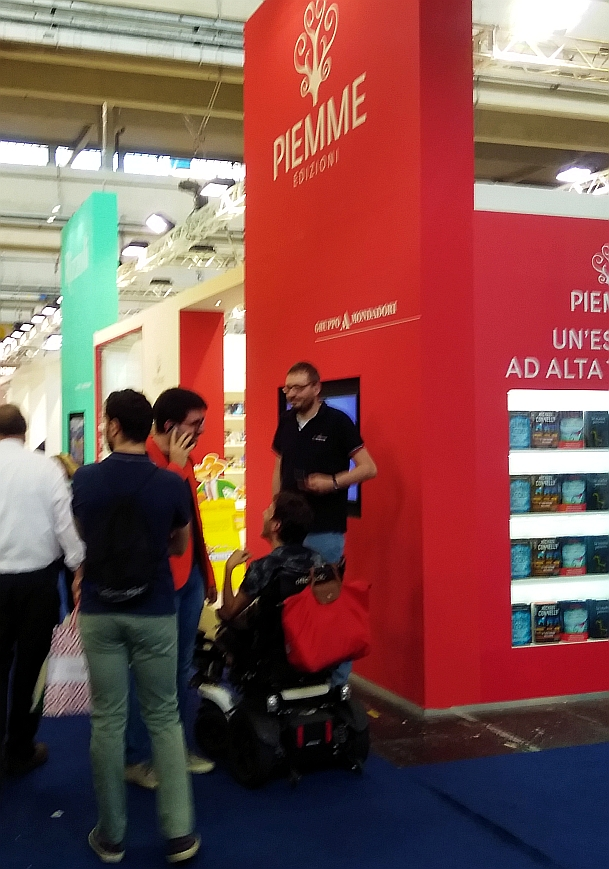
Piemme stand at the 2018 Turin International Book Fair

The company was founded in 1982 by Pietro Marietti in Casale Monferrato, whose family had been involved in the book trade since 1820. The first books to be published were on religious issues and this theme has remained a fundamental part of the catalogue, with authors including John Paul II and Carlo Maria Martini.

In 1999, Elisabetta Dami joined the company. She had worked in children's publishing for twenty years. In 2000, the imprint Il Battello a Vapore appeared. Among its mainstays have been the Geronimo Stilton books, which have sold more than twelve million copies in Italy alone, and the illustrated Milla & Sugar books by Prunella Bat.

In 2009, the Piemme Freeway imprint was established, devoted to books for young adults. The first publications included Il silenzio di Lenth, a fantasy novel by Luca Centi, and Ho scoperto che ti amo by Ann Edwards Cannon.

In 2010, the company published Take Me With You – Talks with Amanda Knox in Prison, written by the Italian lawmaker Rocco Girlanda, the first E-book in English by Piemme.

In January 2023, Piemme published Archbishop Georg Gänswein's tell-all book Nothing but the Truth: My Life Beside Pope Benedict XVI, coincidentally just days after the death of Benedict XVI.
