= San Francesco, Acqui Terme =

Roman Catholic church in Acqui Terme, Italy

Coordinates: 44.68°N 8.47°E

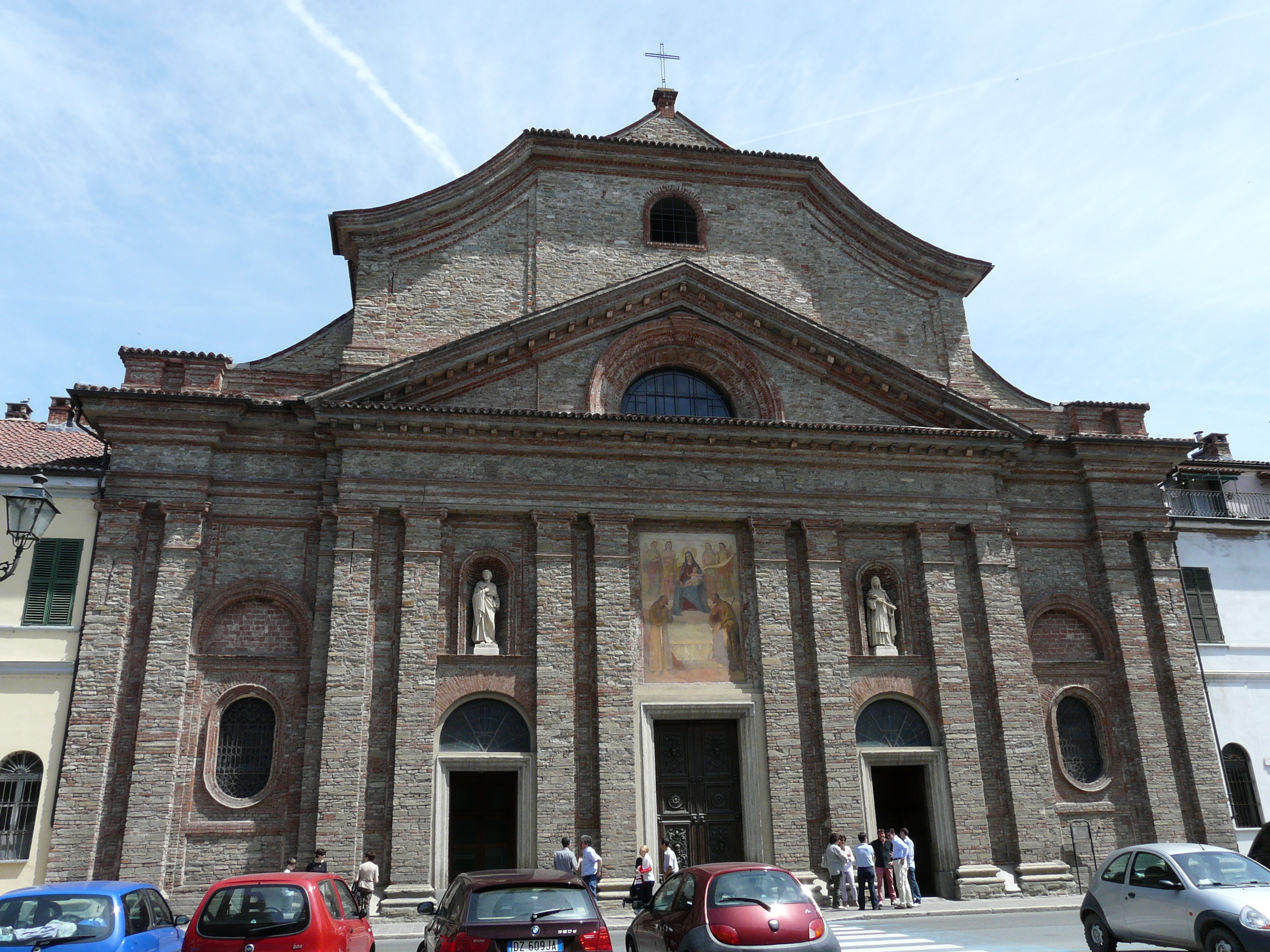
San Francesco (Acqui Terme)

San Francesco is a Roman Catholic church located on Corso Roma at Piazza San Francesco, in Acqui Terme, Province of Alessandria, region of Piedmont, Italy.

== History ==
A church at the site, dedicated to St John, was present since perhaps the seventh century, since nearby Christian burials appear to date from then. In around 1244, the church began to be administered by priests from the Cathedral of Acqui. Around 1410, it became associated with the Franciscan order, and rebuilt and rededicated. The convent was suppressed in 1802, and the church was affiliated with the Confraternity of San Giuseppe, which briefly changed the name of the church. In 1824, the Franciscans returned, and they rebuilt the church in a neoclassic-style, adding the Facade, under the design of Ferraris in 1835, completed in 1854.

Parts of the church are ancient. The bell tower and apse date to the 15th century. But other parts reflect refurbishments over the centuries, including the 19th-century reconstruction. The broad brick facade (1835–1854) shows eclectic styles with a triangular lower tympanum and monumental order pilasters.

The interior houses an Immaculate Conception by il Moncalvo; an Adoration of the Magi by Raffael Angelo Soleri; and a Madonna and Child with Saint Francis and Antony of Padua by Pietro Beccaria. The ceilings were frescoed by the 19th-century painter Pietro Ivaldi, detto il Muto di Toleto.
