= Madonna della Neve, Acqui Terme =

Roman Catholic church in Acqui Terme, Italy

Coordinates: 44°40′48″N 08°28′12″E

The Madonna della Neve or Chiesa della Madonnina is a late-baroque and early-neoclassical-style, Roman Catholic church located on Via Madonnina in Acqui Terme, province of Alessandria, region of Piedmont, Italy.

== History ==
The church was begun in 1727 and completed in 1766. While the façade is sober, the interior is decorated with rococo richness.
