= Ring of Fire (novel) =

Novel by Pierdomenico Baccalario

Ring of Fire is the English translation of L'anello di fuoco, the 2006 Italian fantasy novel for young people written by Pierdomenico Baccalario, with illustrations by Lacopo Bruno. Ring of Fire is Book One of the Century Quartet.

The English translation by Leah D. Janeczko was published in New York by Random House, in 2009 (ISBN 9780375858956). It is held in 597 WorldCat libraries. The novel has also been translated into French, German, Hungarian and Dutch.

Book Two, Star of Stone (ISBN 9780375858963), set in New York City, was published in English in 2010. Book Three, City of Wind, set in Paris, was released in September 2011. The last installment, Dragon of Seas, is set in Shanghai, China. It was released in September 2012.

== Summary ==
At a hotel in Rome, four children, Harvey from New York, Mistral from Paris, Sheng from Shanghai, and Elettra, the hotel owner's daughter, come together, apparently by chance, and realize that they were all born on the same day. They meet a man who gives them a suitcase. The next day the man is killed by powerful enemies who will do anything to get their hands on this treasure. The children are destined to become involved in a mystery involving a briefcase and five tops which contain clues leading to ancient mystical artifacts, a mystery that will bring them all into peril, a race to find the ancient mystical artifacts first and to avoid death.

== Reception ==
Kirkus Reviews gave the book a positive review, stating that while it makes extensive use of genre tropes, the plot is "masterful" and has a satisfying ending. They also praised the quality of the full-color inserts that are bound into the book. Publishers Weekly gave a mixed review, describing the book as "uneven". They criticized the characters as being underdeveloped, but did state that the book has an intriguing premise and some exciting moments. Writing for The Bulletin of the Center for Children's Books, Elizabeth Bush also gave the book a mixed review, criticizing the plot as being disjointed at times and the characters as being undeveloped, but stating that the saving grace for the book is its intriguing setting.
