= Acqui Terme =

Acqui Terme Àich (Piedmontese)
- Comune
- Comune di Acqui Terme
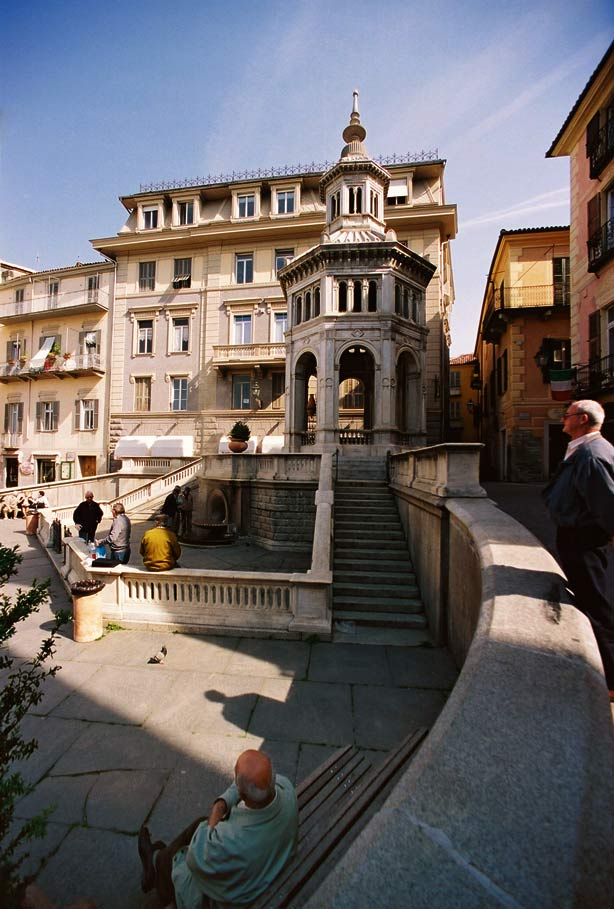
- La Bollente spring.

- Flag Coat of arms

- Location within Italy Location within Piedmont
- Coordinates: 44°41′N 08°28′E
- Country: Italy
- Region: Piedmont
- Province: Alessandria (AL)
- Frazioni: Lussito, Ovrano, Moirano

Government
  - Mayor: Lorenzo Lucchini (Five Star Movement)

Area
  - Total: 33.42 km^{2} (12.90 sq mi)
- Elevation: 156 m (512 ft)

Population (30 April 2017)
  - Total: 19,961
  - Density: 597.3/km^{2} (1,547/sq mi)
- Demonym: Acquesi
- Time zone: UTC+1 (CET)
  - Summer (DST): UTC+2 (CEST)
- Postal code: 15011
- Dialing code: 0144
- Patron saint: Guido of Acqui; Majorinus
- Saint day: June 11; June 27
- Website: Official website

Acqui Terme (Italian pronunciation: [ˈakkwi ˈtɛrme]; Piedmontese: Àich [ˈɑjk]) is a city and comune (municipality) in the province of Alessandria, Piedmont, northern Italy. It is about 35 kilometres (22 mi) south-southwest of Alessandria. It is one of the principal winemaking communes of the Italian DOCG wine Brachetto d'Acqui.

The city's hot sulphur springs have been famous since this was the Roman town of Aquae Statiellae; the ancient baths are referred to by Paulus Diaconus and the chronicler Liutprand of Cremona. In 1870 Giovanni Ceruti designed a small pavilion, known as La Bollente, for the spot at the centre of the town where the water temperature up to 75 °C (167 °F).

== History ==
During the Roman period, the region was connected by road with Alba Pompeia and Augusta Taurinorum (Turin) and was populated by the local Celto-Ligurian tribe of the Statielli. The region was subject to Roman rule after their main center, Carystum (Acqui Terme), was attacked in 173 BC by the legions led by the consul Marcus Popilius Laenas. The Statielli did not oppose resistance, but in contravention of the Roman law of war, the consul killed thousands of them, reduced the other Gauls to slavery, and began to organize the sale of slaves from the population. Some of them were transferred to the north of the Po, but others survived free in small villages in the surrounding areas that remained outside of Roman rule. In 2008 a necropolis was found in the nearby town of Montabone. The remains show that the Statielli conserved their own customs and traditions for the entirety of the first century B.C., and likely after.

While controlled by Rome, an important town was built over Carystum, known for the natural thermal waters and spas. The remains of the aqueduct which supplied the waters and springs can still be found near the center of the town, along the river Bormida.

In the 6th century, Acqui became part of the Lombard kingdom of northern Italy. It was ruled by its bishop from 978, becoming an independent commune in 1135. In 1278 it was annexed to the Marquisate of Montferrat, to which it belonged until the acquisition by the Duchy of Savoy.

It was connected by a railway line to Genoa in 1892.

=== Jewish History ===
Jews first settled in Acqui in the 15th century. Initially, the Gonzaga dynasty was benevolent towards them, refusing to comply with the Papal order to confiscate the Talmud in 1553, and protecting them from civilian mob violence. In 1570, however, Jews were required to wear the yellow badge; in the 16th and 17th centuries, the community experienced restrictions such as being forbidden to appear in public on feast days. In 1848, the Jewish ghetto was abolished, which included the destruction of the old synagogue. In 1881, a new synagogue was constructed, which still stands, as of 2024.

== Main sights ==
- Acqui Cathedral: Romanesque edifice on the Latin cross plan, built in the late 10th century and consecrated in 1067 to Santa Maria Assunta by bishop Guido. The façade has a portal sculpted by Antonio Pilacorte, a late 15th-century rose window and a 17th-century portico. The Gothic-style bell tower is from 1479. The interior houses a late 15th-century triptych by the Spanish artist Bartolomé Bermejo, and a Baroque altar of Saint Guido.
- The Palaeologi Castle, mentioned for the first time in 1056. It was rebuilt in the 15th century by Marquis William VII of Montferrat.
- Church of the Addolorata: also called San Pietro dates to 7th-century. It was almost entirely rebuilt in the 10th-11th centuries in Romanesque style, and attached to a Benedictine abbey. It was again renovated in the 18th century, and returned to a neo-Romanesque appearance in the 1930s.
- Church of San Francesco: rebuilt in 19th-century, stands adjacent to 15th century cloister of the former Franciscan convent.
- Church of the Madonnalta
- Sant'Antonio Abate
- Church of Madonna della Neve
- Roman Aqueduct, also called Roman Arches Site.
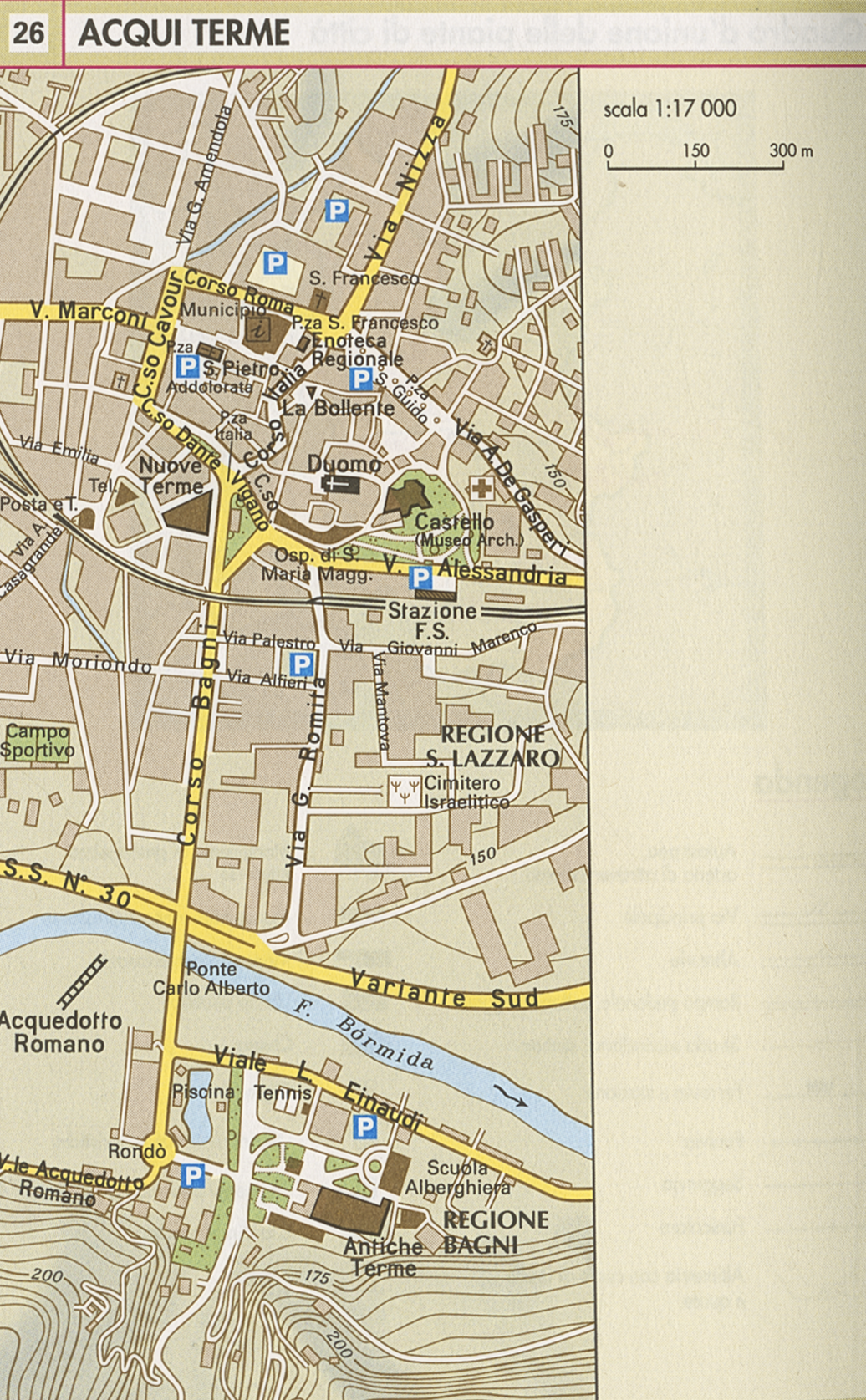
Map of city centre

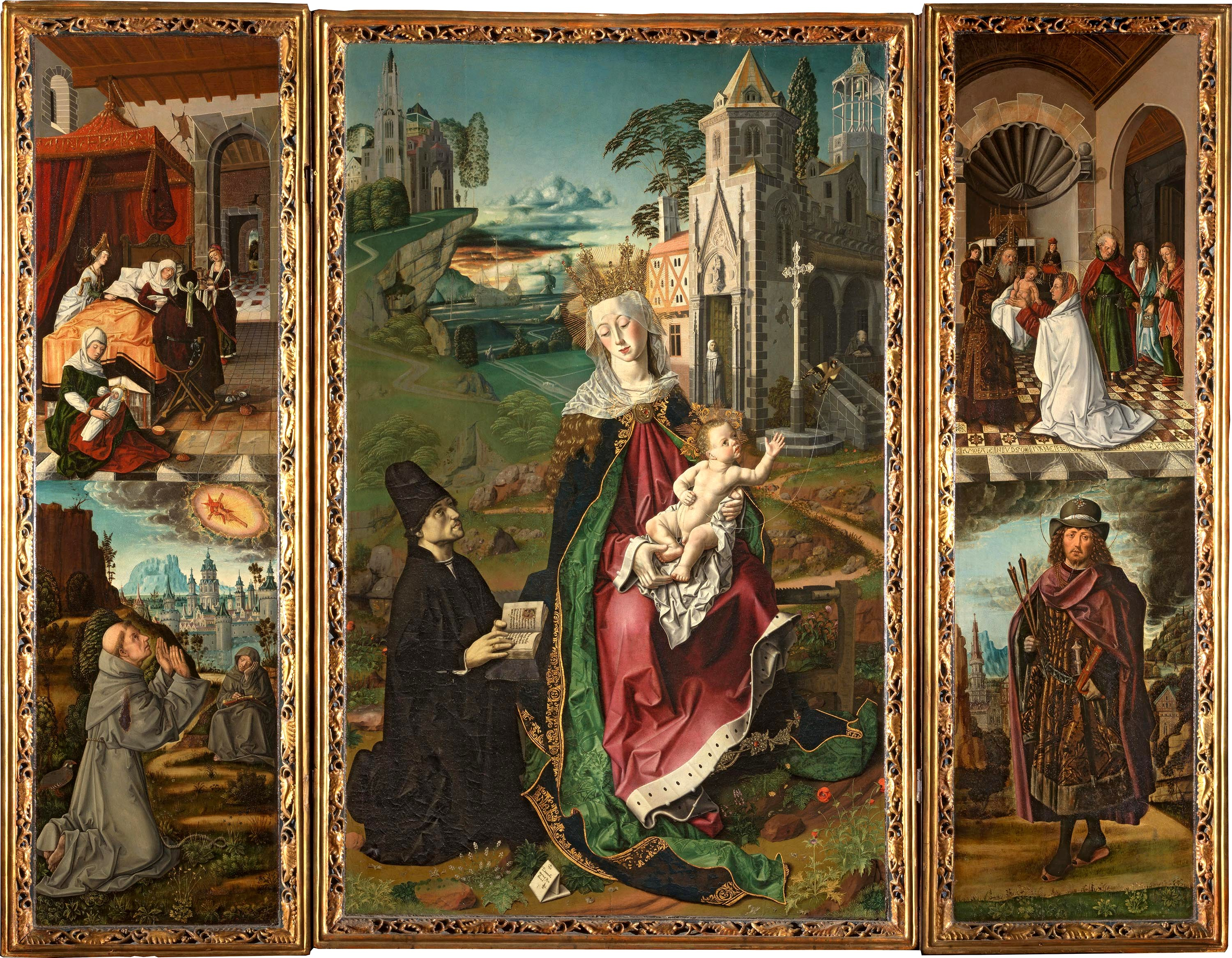
Retable of the Virgin of Montserrat, in the cathedral.

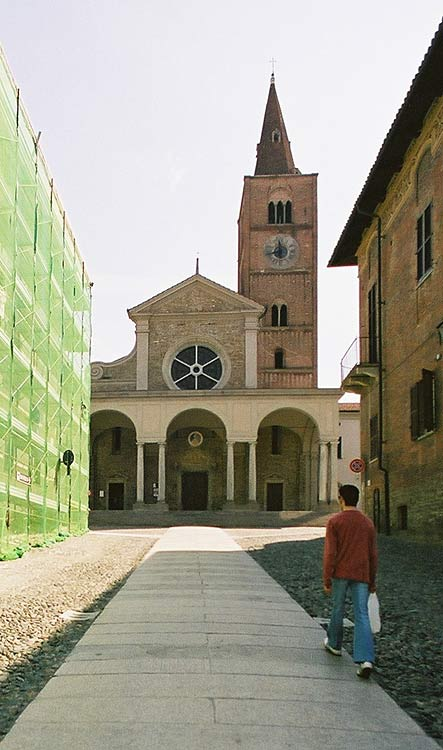
The cathedral. The loggia dates from the 17th century.

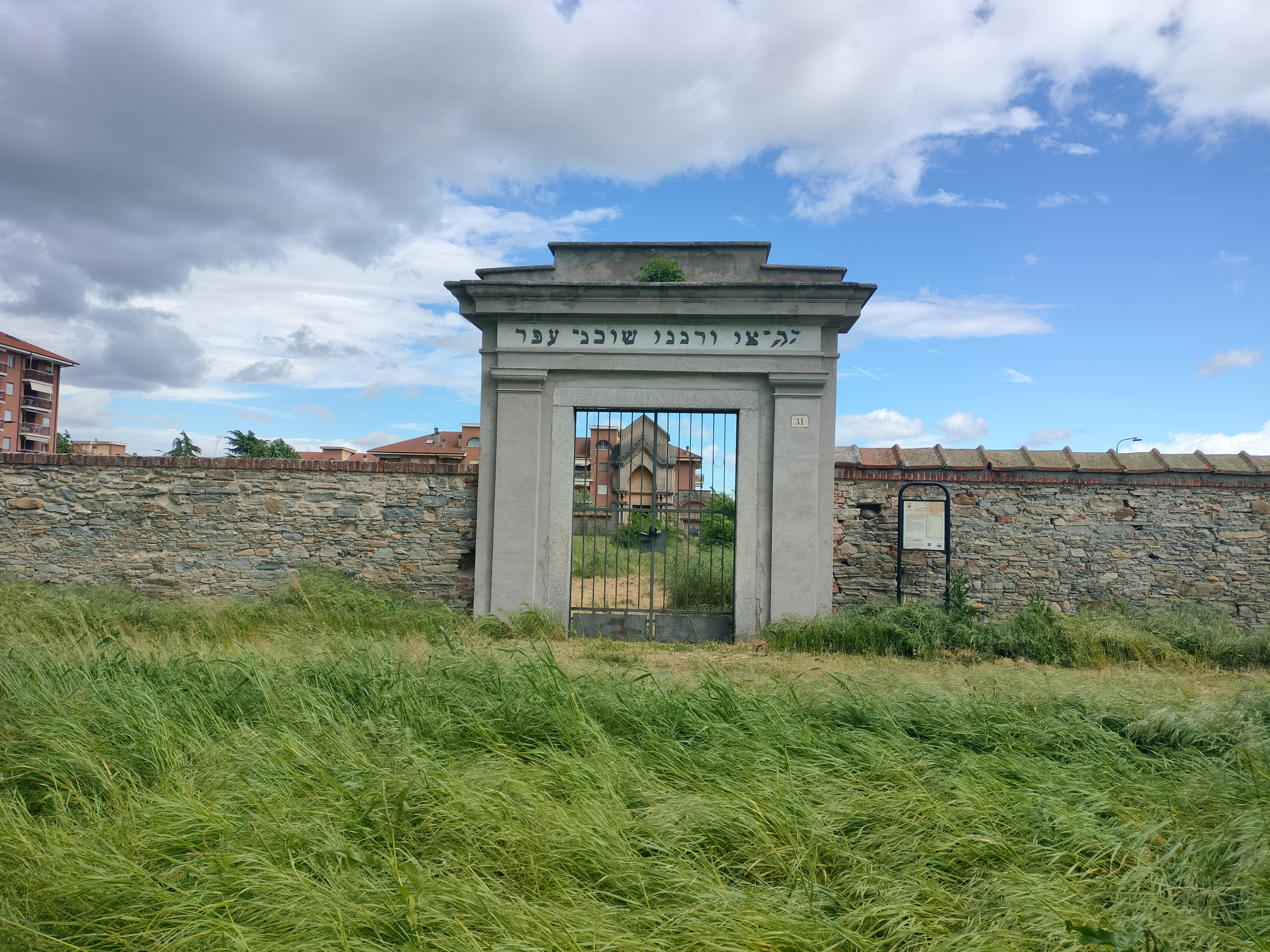
Entrance to the Jewish cemetery

== Twin towns—sister cities ==
Acqui Terme is twinned with:

- Genoa, Italy
- Argostoli, Greece

== People ==
- Pierdomenico Baccalario (born 1974), writer.
- Angelo Baccalario (born 1852), painter.
- Evangelina Bottero (1859–1950), teacher and populariser of science.
- Giulietto Chiesa (born 1940), journalist and politician.
- Luigi Raimondi (born 1912), Apostolic Delegate to the United States, cardinal, Prefect of the Sacred Congregation for the Causes of Saints.
- Piercarlo Galeazzo (born 1965), painter.

== Other ==
The city of Acqui was the namesake for the 33rd Infantry Division "Acqui" of the Royal Italian Army, which was active during World War II.
