= Sant'Antonio Abate, Acqui Terme =

Roman Catholic church in Acqui Terme, Italy

Coordinates: 44°40′31″N 8°28′19″E

Sant'Antonio Abate is a Baroque-style, Roman Catholic church located on Via Bella at Piazzetta don Galliano, in Acqui Terme, Province of Alessandria, region of Piedmont, Italy.

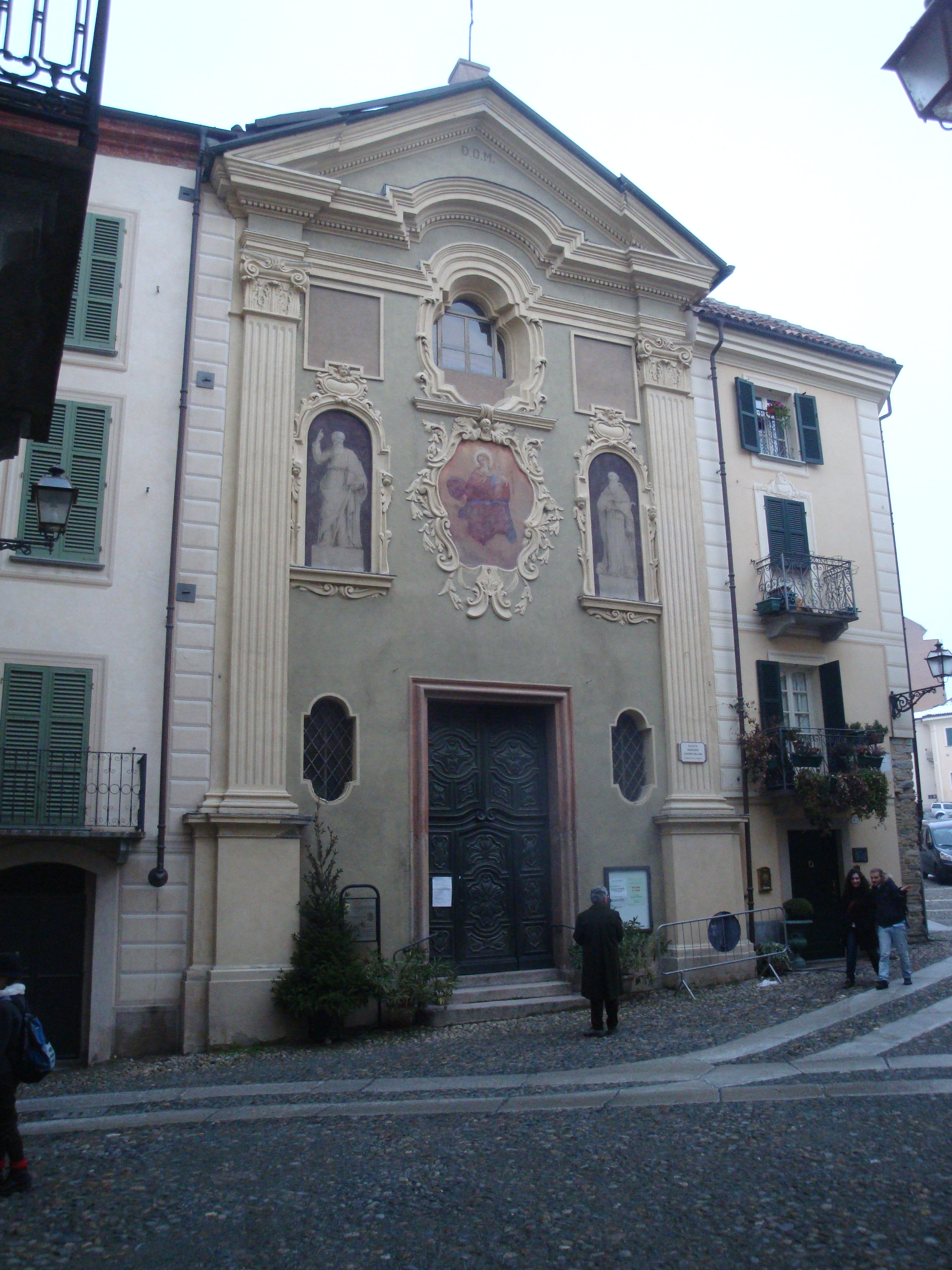
The facade of the church

== History ==
The church was commissioned in 1608 by the Barnabite order, and dedicated to Saint Paul and allied to the local convent of the same name. It was rebuilt in 1701. In 1812, the church was conferred to the custody of the Confraternity of San'Antonio. The church houses Rococo wooden choir stalls and pulpit; and a Baroque sacristy.

The church houses four 18th-century canvases depicting Saints Ambrose, Agatha, Teresa, and John of Nepomuk, which likely belonged to the oratory. The wooden statue of the Virgin dates to the 18th century. The organ was built in 1837 by Giosuè Agati of Pistoia.
