= Church of the Addolorata, Acqui Terme =

Roman Catholic church in Acqui Terme, Italy

Coordinates: 44°40′33.73″N 8°28′4.42″E

The Church of the Addolorata (Italian:Chiesa dell’Addolorata) is a Romanesque-style, Roman Catholic basilica church located on Piazza Addolorata, in Acqui Terme, Province of Alessandria, region of Piedmont, Italy.

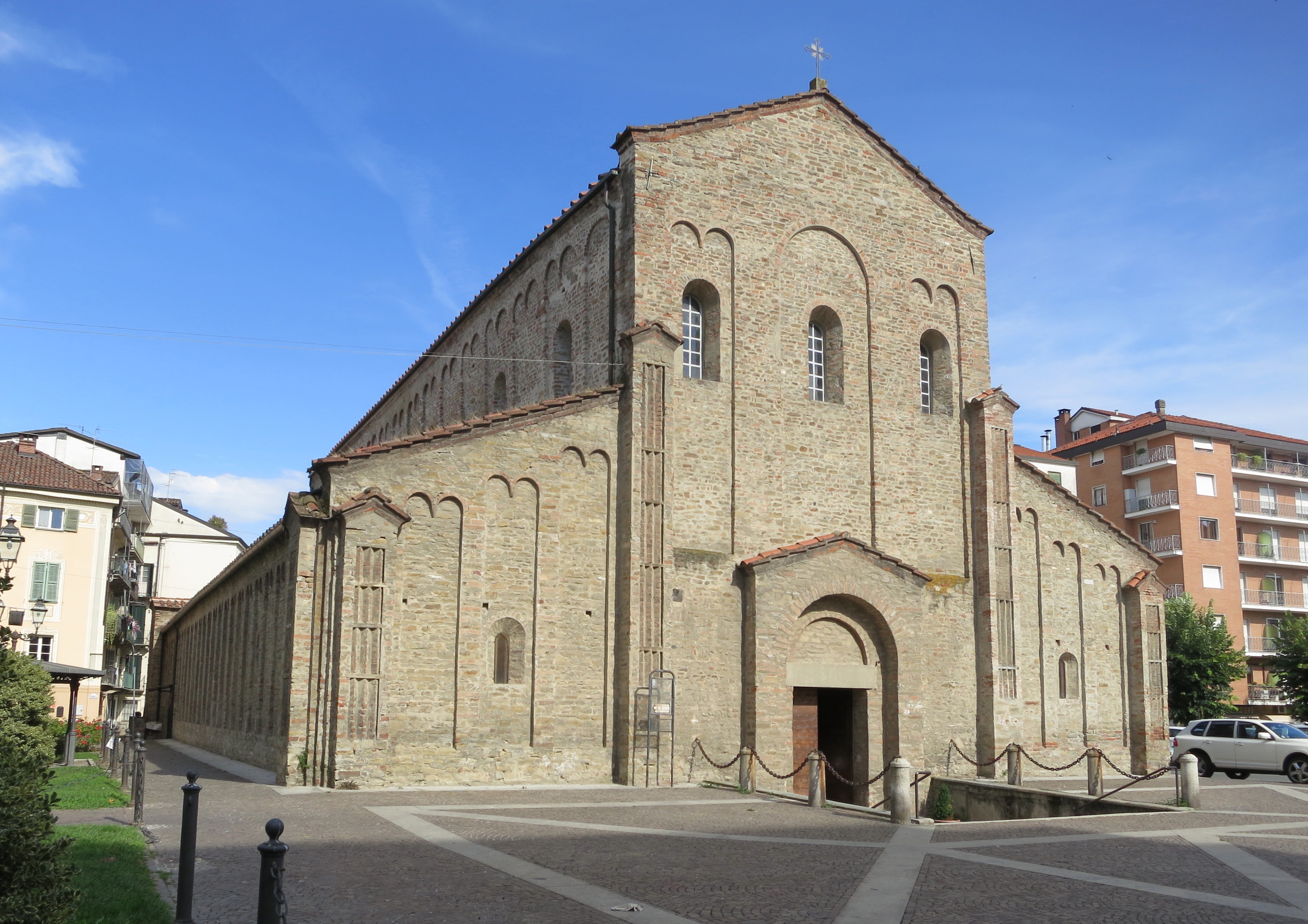
The facade of the church

== History ==
Location of the church of the Addolorata

The church is dedicated to the Marian devotion of Our Lady of Sorrows, however, the church is also called San Pietro, since it was once attached to what was once the adjacent Benedictine monastery of San Pietro.

The layout we see today was built in the 11th century at the site of a late 6th-century paleochristian church located just outside the city walls. It had three naves with an octagonal bell-tower at the southern apse. The simple brick facade has protruding pilasters and shows a trend towards verticality. After 1720, with the closing of the monastery, part of the church was rededicated to the Addolorata. It underwent major restoration after the First World War, that stripped much of the decoration, giving the interior a white-washed simplicity. The apse and the base of the bell-tower retain medieval traces.

The interior conserves a 15th-century Deposition fresco and two 16th-century canvases depicting Christ Crowned with Spines and Christ before Pilate. The wooden statue of the Madonna Addolorata dates to 1720.
