= Chiesa della Madonnalta, Acqui Terme =

Roman Catholic church in Piedmont, Italy

Coordinates: 44°40′32″N 8°26′34″E

The Chiesa della Madonnalta is a Renaissance-style, Roman Catholic church located on Viale Savona (an old Roman road) about three miles from the center of Acqui Terme, Province of Alessandria, region of Piedmont, Italy.

== History ==
The church was first documented from a reconstruction in the 17th century. The church is notable for a portico of tuscan columns. In the lateral altars are a Virgin and Child with Saints Guido and Antony of Padua and a Madonna and Child with young St John the Baptist and St Joseph, from the 17th century. To the left of the entrance is a 16th-century relief of Madonna and child.
