= Evangelina Bottero =

Italian teacher and populariser of science (1859–1950)

- Born: 29 May 1859; Acqui Terme, Piedmont
- Died: 13 November 1950 (aged 91); Rome, Italy
- Education: Scuola Normale Superiore; Sapienza University of Rome (PhD)
- Known for: Il telefono (1883)
- Scientific career
- Workplaces: Female Institute of Higher Education

Evangelina Bottero Pagano (29 May 1859 – 13 November 1950) was an Italian teacher and populariser of science. She was one of the first two women to achieve doctoral degrees in science in unified Italy.

== Biography ==
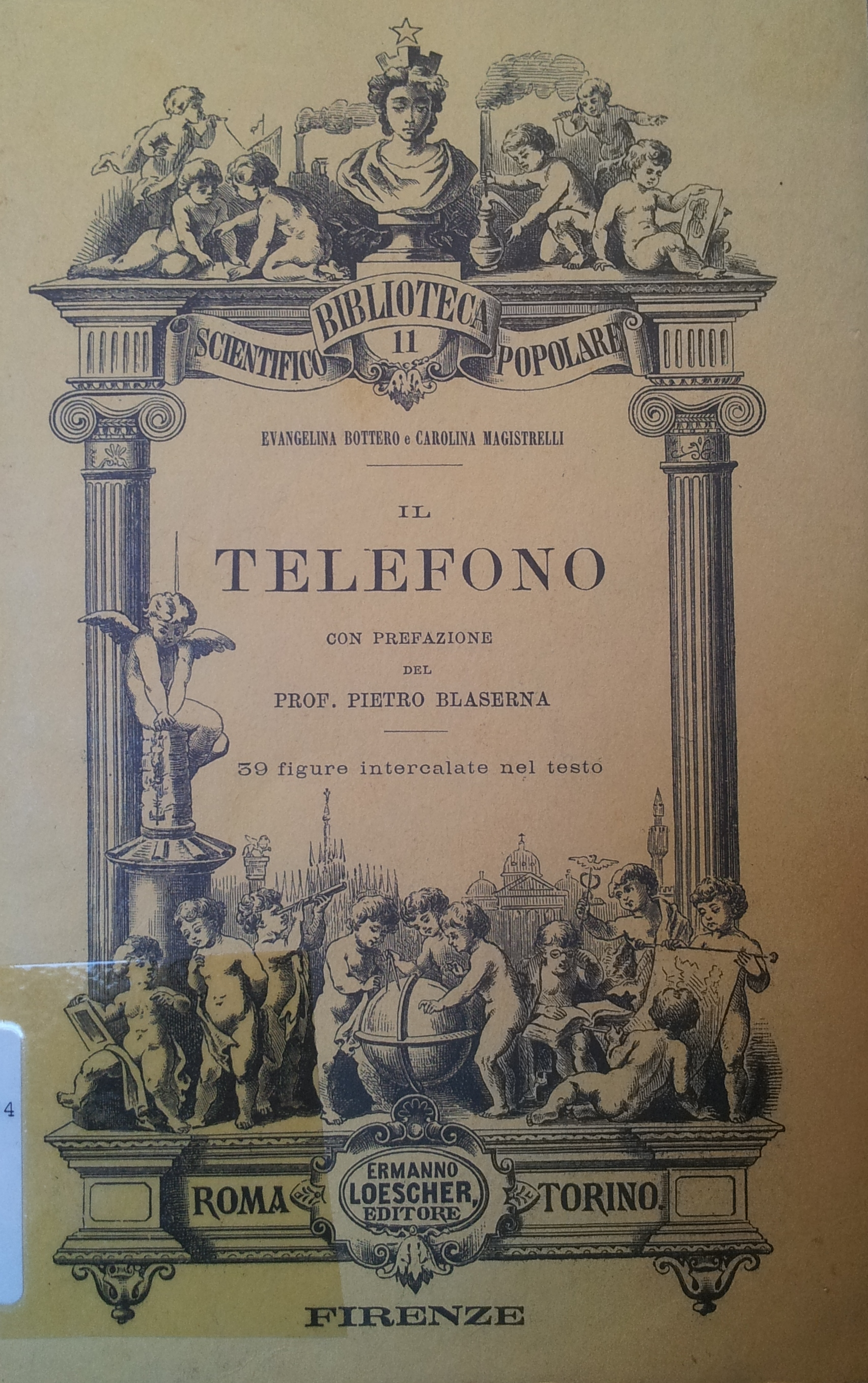
Cover of Il telefono (1883) by Bottero and Carolina Magistrelli

Evangelina Bottero Pagano was born in 1859 in Acqui Terme, Piedmont. Her parents were a lawyer and housewife.

In 1875, Bottero enrolled at the Scuola Normale Superiore in Florence, where she met classmate Carolina Magistrelli [it].

In 1877, Bottero and Magistrelli enrolled at the Sapienza University of Rome as "student auditors," before being admitted to the second year of their course. They graduated in 1881, becoming first women to achieve doctoral degrees in science in unified Italy. Between April 1880 and June 1881, Bottero also obtained three extraordinary specialization scholarships in chemistry and natural sciences from the Ministry of Education.

In 1882, Bottero began teaching physics and chemistry at the Female Institute of Higher Education (ISFM, Italian: Istituto Superiore Femminile di Magistero) in Rome which had been founded in the same year by politician Guido Baccelli. Her friend Magistrelli also taught at the institution, teaching the natural sciences.

In 1883 Bottero and Magistrelli published Il telefono, a manual about the operation and science of the telephone (which had just arrived in Italy) for university students. The book was prefaced by physicist Pietro Blaserna and was dedicated to Queen Margherita of Savoy. Bottero continued publishing science textbooks and in 1886 wrote a pamphlet about women's emancipation.

In 1922, Giovanni Gentile of the fascist Mussolini government abolished the physics chair from the ISFM, ending Bottero's 40 year position. Bottero died in 1950 in Rome, Italy.
