= Ulysses Moore =

Italian novel series

- Front cover of English version of The Door to Time, first book in the series.
- Author: Pierdomenico Baccalario
- Illustrator: Iacopo Bruno, Laura Zuccotti
- Cover artist: Iacopo Bruno
- Country: Italy
- Language: Italian. Translated into Turkish, English, French, Korean, Thai, Polish, Czech, Portuguese, Spanish, Indonesian, Dutch, Slovak, Russian, Greek, Vietnamese, Georgian, German and Hungarian.
- Publisher: Edizioni Piemme (Italy); Scholastic Corporation (US); Editorial Presença (Portugal)
- Media type: Print
- No. of books: 19
- Website: ulyssesmoore.it

Ulysses Moore is a series of adventure books written by the Italian author Pierdomenico Baccalario. The plot of the series centers on the fictional village of Kilmore Cove and its Doors of Time. The book has been published by Scholastic Corporation, a New York-based publishing company.

== Series ==
1. The Door to Time English Version 2006 ISBN 0439774381
2. The Long-Lost Map English Version 2006 ISBN 043977439X
3. The House of Mirrors English Version 2007 ISBN 0439776724
4. The Isle of Masks English Version 2008 ISBN 0439776716
5. The Stone Guardians
6. The First Key
7. The Hidden City
8. The Lord of the Ray
9. The Shadow Labyrinth
10. The Ice Land
11. The Ash Garden
12. The Imaginary Travelers
13. The Boat to Time
14. The Journey to the Dark Harbours
15. The Pirates of the Imaginary Sea
16. The Island of Rebels
17. The Battle of Time
18. The Great Summer
19. The Worlds at the End of the World

== Kilmore Cove ==
Kilmore Cove is a hypothetical village located in Cornwall, England. This is where the main plot of the series is set. However, the adventures are not limited to this village. Some of the main characters often travel via the "Doors of Time". The village is isolated from the rest of the world and it is not shown on maps. The Imaginary Travelers continually try to protect the "Doors of Time".

== Doors of Time ==
The story of the first seven books focuses on the Doors of Time and their keys. There are several Doors of Time spread around the village, and each door requires its own unique key to open it. Once opened, it leads to a distant time and space specific to that door and it can only be reopened when all of the travelers who passed through it return.

The only exception is the Door of Time inside the Argo Mansion, which can take the traveler to any place he or she wants, as opposed to the fixed locations the other Doors offer. However, four keys are needed to open that one, making it the most difficult door to access. This particular door leads to a cave where there is a lake and a boat called "Metis" used to take the Travelers to their destinations.

== Characters ==
- Jason and Julia Covenant live at the Argo Mansion, but are from London. They are twins and are eleven years old in the first book and turn thirteen in the seventh book. Julia is a little taller than Jason. Both are blond and have blue eyes. In the sixth book, Julia starts dating Rick Banner and in the eighth book Anita Bloom becomes Jason's girlfriend.
- Rick Banner is one year older than the twins and has always lived in Kilmore Cove. He is a redhead and his father died when he was young. In the sixth book, it is revealed that his father died because he was searching with Leonard Minaxo for the First Key.
- Ulysses Moore was married to Penelope Moore and they were the owners of the Argo Mansion. Nestor, the butler of the Argo Mansion, is actually Ulysses Moore, who uses this disguise because the village people bothered him. After the death of his wife, however, Ulysses stayed on as butler at the Argo Mansion
- Penelope Moore was Ulysses' wife. They met on a trip to Venice, and fell in love.
- Leonard Minaxo is the lighthouse keeper of the village and was a member of The Imaginary Travelers club, as were Ulysses and Penelope Moore. Towards the end of the sixth book it is revealed that Leonard had a secret passion for Calypso, the librarian.
- Anita Bloom enters the story in the seventh book. She lives in Venice, Italy, with her mother while her father lives in England. She finds a book from a painter who also belonged to The Imaginary Travelers club and with the help of Ulysses Moore's diaries she goes to Kilmore Cove to find the Covenant twins.
- Nestor is the caretaker of Argo Manor
- Oblivia Newton is a millionaire, who wants to control all the doors and is the villain in the 1-6 books
