= Roberto Vignoli =

Photographer (b. 1958)

Roberto Vignoli (born 1958, Rome, Italy) is a photographer who lives and works in Rome, known in both documentary and artistic circles. His photographs are inspired by cultural anthropology, architecture and environment. He is also a published writer and poet.

== Early life and education ==
After attending high school at the Aviation College in Rome, Vignoli went on to study anthropology at La Sapienza University. He learned English at the Central School of London, earning an advanced-level certificate. He developed an early interest in photography, having shot his first documentary images in Europe and Africa when he was a teenager. He went on to study photography with Roberto Rocchi.

== Career ==
=== Documentary photography ===
Vignoli has worked for some of the most important photographic agencies in the world, such as Image Bank (now part of Getty Images),) Grazie Neri, Granata Press, AGF and Luz. From 1985 to 2012, he also worked for the Italian weekly newspaper, L’Espresso, having spent ten of those years in the Photo Office, where he was curator of the foreign and cultural pages. His work has been published in Il Messaggero, L’Unità, Il Tirreno, Informazioni Editoriali, Qui giovani, Penthouse, Successo, NoiDonne, Italiani, L’Informatore Librario, Immaginazionem (Manni Editore), and Presenza Taurisanese.

He has been collaborating with the newspaper La Ragione since 2021.

=== Art photography ===
Vignoli's photos have been shown widely in Italy, France, Germany, Argentina, Cuba, the United States, Turkey, Hungary and Australia, in both group and solo exhibitions.

Vignoli was included in “MACRO Asilo” at The Museo d'Arte Contemporanea Roma (MACRO), curated by Giorgio de Finis and “On the Road” at the Piomonti Arte Contemporanea curated by Pio Monti, shows that also included Joseph Beuys, Christo and Jeanne-Claude, Joseph Kosuth, Enzo Cucchi, Michelangelo Pistoletto, Bill Viola and Shirin Neshat.

Solo exhibitions have taken place at Inboccalupo Gallery (Buenos Aires); Mondo Bizzarro Gallery (Rome); Galeria Carmen Montilla (Havana); the Chambre de Commerce de Marseille; Museo Laboratorio d'Arte Contemporanea and Casa delle Letterature (both Rome); and TandM Arts Studio (Philadelphia, PA, USA).

Vignoli's work has also been collected by museums for permanent installations such as his panoramas: Malecon (Museo Bilotti Ruggi d’Aragona, Cosenza, Italy); Sioux Portraits Panorama (Buechel Lakota Memorial Museum, St. Francis South Dakota); and Aboriginal Portraits Panorama (Redfern Community Centre, Sydney, Australia).

=== Books (writing, poetry and photographs) ===
Vignoli's photographic activities have always left space for his passion for literature. He has published novels: Un lampadario nell’anello di fumo, Bastogi Editrice Italiana, 1992 and Il soffio sulla spalla, (Bastogi Editrice Italiana, 2006); short stories: Se un altro fosse me,(Bastogi Editrice Italiana, 2008) and 5 fotoromanzi d’amore sfrenato, Edizioni Calliope Italia, 2011); and poetry: L’inverno sono gli atri, Edizioni Ensemble 2016. He also translated Jean Poirier's Storia dell’etnologia from French into Italian.

Vignoli has collaborated with other artists as in the book Fondi, percorsi d’acqua (Associazione Libero de Libero, 2016), where his photographs complement the poems of Claudio Damiani. His photographs appear in Accendi una finestra (Robin Editions, Torino, 2024), with poetry by Claudia Quintieri.

== Bibliography ==
=== Published articles, stories and photographs by Roberto Vignoli ===
- "Tristi Zotici," Solathia, story, vol.17, no. 10, Oct. 1987, pp. 69–70

- "Motori Ruggenti," Penthouse (Italian edition), article, vol. 5, no. 2, Feb. 1990, pp. 34–37

- "La Spider Corsara," Penthouse (Italian edition), article, vol. 5, no. 5, May 1990, pp. 90–05

- "La Terza Incomoda," Penthouse (Italian edition), article, vol. 5, no. 6, June 1990, pp. 64–70

- "Immagini di Auto d'Epoca," L'Espresso, article, vol. 37, no. 9, 3 Mar. 1991, pp. 168–169

- "Lancia e Ford all'Attacco," Qui Giovani, article, vol. 1, no. 95, 1 June 1991 p. 14

- "Lancia in Nuova Zelanda per il Mondiale Piloti," Qui Giovani, article, vol. 1, no. 109 p. 14

- "Lancia alla Conquista del Mondiale Piloti," Qui Giovani, article, vol. 1, no. 113, 27 June 1991, p. 15

- "Parte Oggi il Rally Tedesco Valido Solo per l'Europa," Qui Giovani, article, vol. 1, no. 128, 18 July 1991, p. 15

- "Lancia in Resta," Qui Giovani, article, vol. 1, no. 131, 23 July 1991, p. 15

- "Lancia da Affilare," Qui Giovani, article, vol. 1, no. 136, 30 July 1991, p. 14

- "Parte il Millelaghi," Qui Giovani, article, vol. 1, no. 150, 22 Aug. 1991, p. 15

- "Lancia, il Nord Porta Bene," Qui Giovani, article, vol. 1, no. 153, 27 Aug. 1991, p. 15

- "Lancia d'Australia," Qui Giovani, article, vol. 1, no. 170, 19 Sept. 1991, p. 15

- "Juha Kankkune e la Sfortuna di Carlos Saenz," Qui Giovani, article, vol. 1, no. 176, 27 Sept. 1991, p. 14

- "Sanremo Sainz Problemi," Qui Giovani, article, vol. 1, no. 187, 12 Oct. 1991, p. 14

- "Lancia all'Attaco," Qui Giovani, article, vol. 1, no. 211, 13 Nov. 1991, p. 14

- "Un Montecarlo sulla Neve e senza Lancia," Qui Giovani, article, vol. 2. no. 15, 22 Jan. 1991, p. 14

- "Toyota Rilancia," Qui Giovani, article, vol. 2, no. 34, 18 Feb. 1991, p. 14

- "Lancia Favorita," Qui Giovani, article, vol. 2, no. 60, 25 May 1992, p. 15

- "L'Ultimo Pianerottolo," Informationi Editoriali Bastogi, story, no. 3, Nov. 1993, p. 9

- "Un Po' di Sabbia con la Mano Sinistra," Informationi Editoriali Bastogi, story, no. 2, Nov. 1994

- "Irriverenti, Privilegiate Coincidenze," Informationi Editoriali Bastogi, article, no. 2, June 1995, p. 4

- "Trasparenza e Libertà di Scrivere," Informationi Editoriali Bastogi Speciale, article, Dec. 1995, p. 9

- "Bravo, Brava, bis," Successo, article, vol. 1, no. 0, Mar. 1996, pp. 52–58

- Noi Donne, article and photograph, vol. 52, no. 12, Dec. 1997, pp. 52–58

- "Nascere da un Sogno," Italiani, article, vol. 5, no. 7, Aug./Sept. 1998, pp. 26–28

- L’Ingegnere Italiano, cover photograph, vol. 32, no. 11, May 2000

- Viaggi e Sapori, photograph no. 4/5, Aug./Sept. 2002, p. 194

- Viaggi e Sapori, photograph no. 6, Oct. 2002, pp. 118–119

- La Repubblica, photograph vol. 35, no. 153, 30 June 2010, pp. 48–49

- Fondi, percorsi d’acqua, un libro fotografico con le poesie di Claudio Damiani, Associazione Libero de Libero, 2016

- Specchi (Storia degli Sciarra Imprenditori del Vetro), Claudio Sciarra in collaboration with Paola Pilati, photographs, chapter 4, “L’occasione dell’Esposizione," Gangemi International, Rome, 2022

- Accendi una finestra, photographs, Claudia Quintieri poetry, Robin Editions, Torino, 2024

=== Published articles about Roberto Vignoli's photographs ===
- "Un Augurio," Resine, no. 51, first trimester, 1991, p. 94

- "Roberto Vignoli, Un Lampadario nell’Anello di Fumo," Informazioni Editoriali Bastogi, no. 1, 1993, p. 4

- "Malecon, Maxifoto Lunga 18 Metri," Corriere della Sera – Roma, vol. 134, no. 53, June 2009, p. 10

- "Tutti i Colori Dell’Avana," Il Punto, vol. 2, no. 22, June 2010, pp. 74–75

- "La Croisette de la Havane sur une Photo de 19 Metres de Long!," Ouest France, no. 20154, 4-5 Dec. 2010, p. 20

- "Il Più Lungo Malecon del Mondo," Smoking, vol. 11, no. 42, Jan./June 2010, pp. 24–29

- "Raccontami una Foto," L'Espresso, vol. 58, no. 6, Jan. 2012, p. 135

- "Il Colonialismo nei Volti dei Sioux di Roberto Vignoli," La Repubblica – Roma, vol. 40, no. 207, Sept. 2015, p. X

- "Aborigeni e Sioux, la Lotta per i Diritti Civili in una Grande Foto," Corriere della Sera – Roma, vol. 140, no. 207, Sept. 2015, p. 9

- "Aborigeni e Sioux Uniti nel Ritratto," L'Espresso, vol. 51, no. 36, 10 Sept. 2015, p. 85

- "Il Poeta e il Fotografo Celebrano 'Fondi, Percorsi d’Acqua'," Latina Editoriale Oggi, vol. 28, no. 280, 4 Dec. 2015, p. 34

- "Fighters," Il Manifesto – Alias, vol. 46, no. 290, 3 Dec. 2016, pp. 1–3

- "Hatuey, Eroe Ribelle," Corriere della Sera – Roma, vol. 141, no. 308, Dec. 2016, p. 13

- "Roberto Vignoli, la lotta per i diritti civili nei ritratti di aborigeni e Sioux," di Lauretta Colonnelli, Corriere della Sera, sec. Roman/Cultura, Sept. 2, 2015 (digital edition)
