= Rocco Girlanda =

Italian politician

Rocco Girlanda (born January 31, 1966) is an Italian politician. He is also an entrepreneur, journalist and media proprietor. A native of Gubbio, he owns the Italian publishing house Corriere, whose publications include several important newspapers.

From 2009 to 2011 he was President of the Italy-USA Foundation, a non-profit organization based in Rome. The Embassy of the United States in Rome officially attended the establishment of the Foundation, represented by the Minister Counselor for Public Affairs.

He is a member of the People of Freedom Party, was elected to the Italian Chamber of Deputies in 2008, and is currently a member of the Judiciary Committee.

On Sunday December 13, 2009, he met with the American prisoner Amanda Knox in Capanne prison on the outskirts of Perugia, and went on to write a book about his talks with her.

In January 2010 he proposed designating December 21 "National Day of the Victims of Political Hatred", in remembrance of the 13 December 2009 aggression directed towards Silvio Berlusconi in Milan.

== Works ==
- Take me with you - Talks with Amanda Knox in prison, Piemme, 2010, ISBN 978-88-566-1562-3
