= Pierdomenico Baccalario =

Italian author

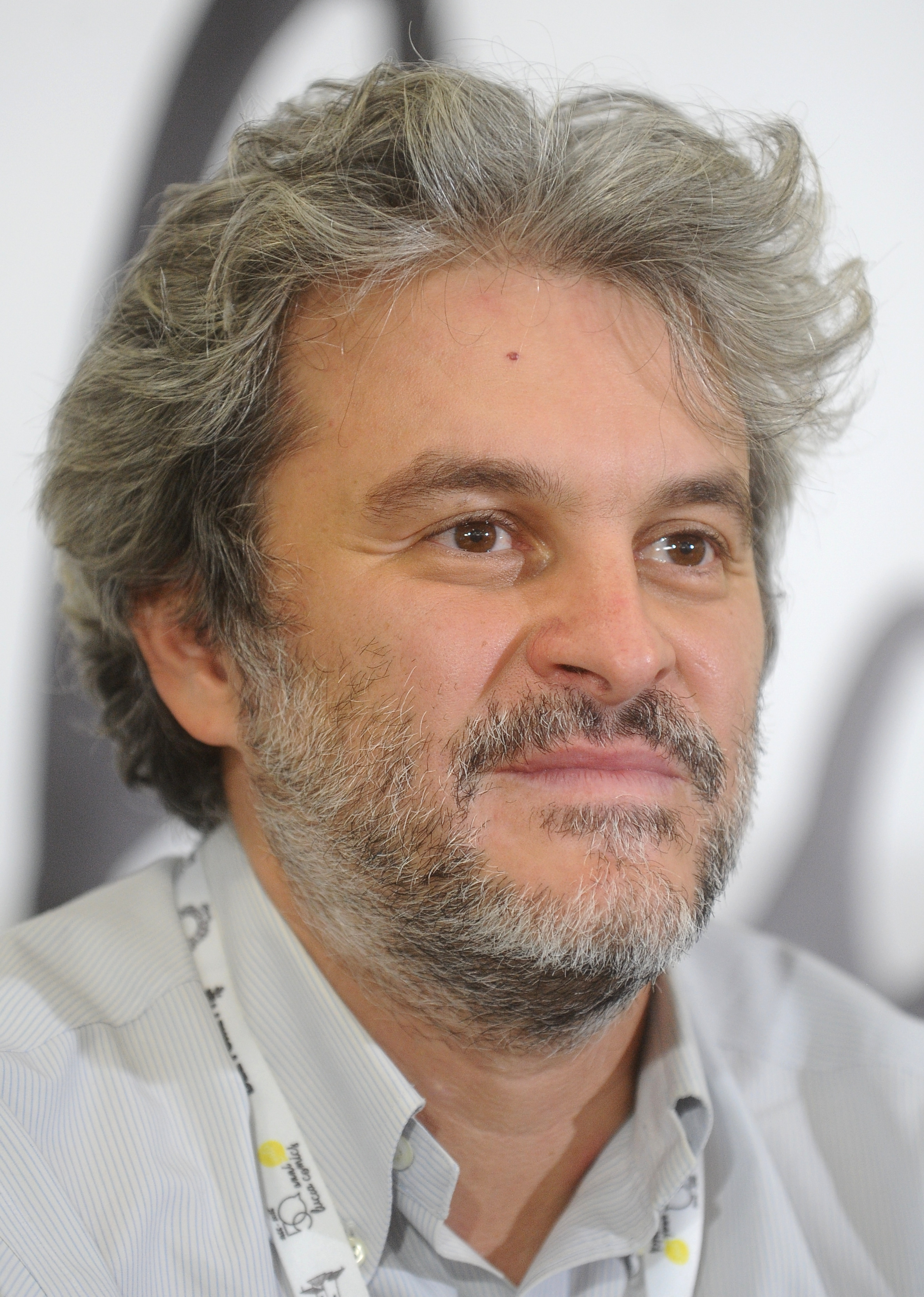

Pierdomenico Baccalario (born 6 March 1974) is an Italian author of children's and young adult fiction, best known for his Ulysses Moore series that sold more than 10 million copies worldwide.

== Biography ==
Pierdomenico Baccalario was born in Acqui Terme, Italy, in 1974. He studied law in university, but he continued to write, a passion that he had had since high school, and published his first book, ′′La strada del guerriero′′ in 1999. The book was popular in Italy but was never translated into English.

In 2004 he published the first of so far 19 novels in the Ulysses Moore series, which has since been translated in 29 languages and sold 10 million copies worldwide.

Baccalario lives part time in Italy and part time in London with his wife Marina Della Giusta, a professor of economy at the University of Reading, and their two daughters. He is the founder of Book on a Tree, a company with some 15 employees, publishing 60 books a year.

In 2019 he was shortlisted for the Premio Strega for author's writing for children (age 11+).

== Bibliography ==
=== Novels ===
==== Stand-alone novels ====
- La Strada del Guerriero (Piemme)
- L'ombra del corvo (Piemme)
- La Bibbia in 365 racconti (2004) (Paoline)
- La mosca di rame (2005) (Paoline)
- I mastrodonti (2006) (Paoline)
- Pesci Volanti (with Elena Peduzzi) (2007) (Fanucci)
- Amaro dolce Amore (with Elena Peduzzi) (2008) (Fanucci)
- Il principe della città di sabbia (with Enzo d'Alò and Gaston Kaborè) (2008) (Arnoldo Mondadori Editore)
- Il popolo di Tarkaan (2009) (Piemme)
- La bambina che leggeva i libri (2010) (Fanucci)
- Il Codice dei Re (2010) (Piemme)
- Lo spacciatore di fumetti (2011) (Einaudi)
- Maydala Express (with Davide Morosinotto) (2011) (Piemme)
- La vera storia di Capitan Uncino (2011) (Piemme)

==== La Clessidra ====
Published by De Agostini.

- 2002: Verso la nuova frontiera
- 2002: Al di là degli oceani
- 2002: Il mistero dell'Everest
- 2002: Il Signore dell'Orda
- 2003: La fortezza degli angeli
- 2004: La regina della tavola rotonda

==== Ulysses Moore ====
Published by Piemme. English translation published by Scholastic.

- 2004: The Door to Time
- 2005: The Long-Lost Map
- 2005: The House of Mirrors
- 2006: The Isle of Masks
- 2006: The Stone Guardians
- 2007: The First Key
- 2008: The Hidden City
- 2009: The Lord of the Ray
- 2009: The Shadow Labyrinth
- 2010: The Ice Land
- 2010: The Ash Garden
- 2011: The Imaginary Travelers
- 2013: The Boat of Time
- 2014: The Journey to the Dark Harbours
- 2014: The Pirates of the Imaginary Sea
- 2015: The Island of Rebels'
- 2016: The Battle of Time
- 2016: The Great Summer
- 2024: The Worlds at The End of The World

==== Candy Circle ====
Collaboration with Alessandro Gatti; published by Arnoldo Mondadori Editore.

- 2005: Pronti... partenza... crash!
- 2005: Attenti al guru!
- 2005: Salsicce e misteri
- 2005: Tutti addosso al drago rosso!
- 2005: Quando il bomber fa cilecca...
- 2005: Pecore alla deriva
- 2006: Faccia di menta
- 2006: Chi ha paura del Candy Circle?
- 2006: Paura a Gravenstein Castle
- 2008: Il tempio degli scorpioni di smeraldo

==== Century ====
Published by Piemme. English translation published by Random House.

- 2006: Ring of Fire (it. L'anello di fuoco)
- 2007: Star of Stone (it. La stella di pietra)
- 2007: City of Wind (it. La città del vento)
- 2008: Dragon of Seas (it. La prima sorgente)

==== Will Moogley Agenzia Fantasmi ====
Published by Piemme.

- 2008: Hotel a cinque spettri
- 2008: Una famiglia... da brivido
- 2009: Il fantasma del grattacielo
- 2009: Anche i fantasmi tremano
- 2009: Un mostro a sorpresa
- 2010: Il re del brivido
- 2010: Terrore in casa Tupper

==== I gialli di vicolo Voltaire ====
Collaboration with Alessandro Gatti; published by Piemme.

- 2009: Un bicchiere di veleno
- 2009: Non si uccide un grande mago
- 2010: Lo strano caso del ritratto fiammingo
- 2010: Vacanza con delitto
- 2010: La baronessa nel baule
- 2011: Il mistero del quaderno cinese
- 2011: Lo scheletro sotto il tetto

==== Cyboria ====
Published by De Agostini.

- 2009: Cyboria. Il risveglio di Galeno
- 2011: Cyboria. Ultima fermata: Fine del mondo
- 2013: Cyboria. Il re dei lumi

==== La Bottega Battibaleno ====
Published by Piemme.

- 2012: Una valigia di stelle
- 2012: La bussola dei sogni
- 2013: La mappa dei passaggi
- 2013: La ladra di specchi

==== I Classicini ====
Rewrites of classical novels, published by Edizioni EL.

- L'isola del tesoro (Treasure Island)
- Il richiamo della foresta (The Call of the Wild)

=== Anthologies ===
- 2009: Sanctuary (Asengard Editore)

=== Non-fiction ===
- Passaggio a Nord-Est, La vita avventurosa di Giacomo Bove (with Andrea Canobbio)
- Focus, Le più incredibili curiosità sugli animali (Mondadori)
- Focus, Invenzioni e scienziati pazzi (Mondadori)
- Focus, Mostri e creature orripilanti (Mondadori)
- Focus, Tesori perduti (Mondadori)
- Focus, Le più incredibili curiosità della natura selvaggia (Mondadori)
- Focus Junior. Tutti i più incredibili misteri dell'universo (Mondadori)

=== Screenplays ===
- Zombie Family (Pixel Dna)
- Candy Circle pilot episode (with Alessandro Gatti and Enzo d'Alò)
