= Angelo Baccalario =

Italian painter

Angelo Baccalario (born 19 November 1852) was an Italian painter of landscapes, mainly in the Piedmont.

He was born in Acqui, province of Alessandria, to Cavalier Angelo and Virginia Provenzale of Turin. He graduated from law studies in Turin in 1873, but abandoned this for painting, entering in 1873 the studio of Carlo Felice Biscarra. He then went to Quinto al Mare near Genoa, and studied under the landscape painter Serafino De Avendano. Baccalario returned often to Turin, where he frequented the studio of Alberto Pasini. Among his works are:

- La piazza dei pesci a Porto Maurizio, bought by Società promotrice Torinese di Belle Arti
- La casa di Ruffini a Taggia, bought by King Umberto
- Gli ultimi sorrisi d'autunno, bought by the Duchess of Genoa
- La Madonnetta in Liguria, bought by the Duchess of Genoa
- Casolari presso Quinto al Mare, bought by the Prince of Carignano
- Sotto i portici in Liguria, bought by the Prince of Tommaso Duca di Genova

He exhibited in the Salon of Paris in 1879, and in 1883 in the Exhibition of Nizza Marittima.
