= Museo de Escultura al Aire Libre de Alcalá de Henares =

Museum of Outdoor Sculpture of Alcala de Henares
- Museo de Escultura al Aire libre de Alcalá de Henares

- Location in Spain
- Established: August 24, 1993; 33 years ago
- Location: Alcalá de Henares; Community of Madrid; Spain
- Coordinates: 40.482642°N 3.373703°W
- Type: Open-air museum
- Collection size: Contemporary art
- Director: José Noja
- Public transit access: Vía Complutense

The Museum of Outdoor Sculpture of Alcala de Henares (Museo de Escultura al Aire Libre de Alcalá de Henares) is a permanent exhibition of contemporary art in a public Alcalá de Henares (Madrid — Spain), opened in 1993 and organized by the sculptor José Noja.

== History ==
The museum was started in 1991 by sculptor José Noja inaugurated in August 1993. The collection consists of 58 sculptures both figurative and abstract art, modern and contemporary works mainly Spanish artists, as well as Americans and Europeans. The sculptures are arranged in two urban sections: along the Complutense Avenue (Vía Complutense), and bordering the old city walls. This makes it the longest in its class of all Europe, with more than two kilometers long. There are interesting statues of important artists such as Amadeo Gabino, José Lamiel, Pablo Serrano or Úrculo, among others.

== Sculptors ==
The collection includes works by the following sculptors:

- Agar Blasco
- Aizkorbe
- Alberto Guzmán
- Amadeo Gabino
- Aurelio Teno
- Beatiz Kohn
- Berrutti
- Camín
- Carlos Evangelista
- Carlos García Muela
- Carlos Prada
- Carmen Castillo
- Carmen Perujo
- Cristóbal
- Elena Laverón
- Encarnación Hernández
- Enrique Ramos Guerra
- Ernesto Knörr
- Feliciano Hernández
- Fernando Suárez
- Ferreiro Badía
- Francisco Barón
- Gaudi Esté
- Gil Arévalo
- Isidro Blasco
- Javier Santxotena
- Javier Sauras
- Jesús Molina
- Joan Llacer
- Jorge Seguí
- Jorge Varas
- José Lamiel
- José Luis Pequeño
- José Luis Sánchez
- José Manuel Alberdi
- José Noja
- Lilianne Katsuki
- Lorenzo Frechilla
- Luis Caruncho
- María Carretero
- María Teresa Torras
- Máximo Trueba
- Miguel Moreno
- Nassio
- Noud de Wolf
- Pablo Serrano
- Rafael Barrios
- Rafael Muyor
- Ramiro Arango
- Ricardo Beleña
- Sebastián
- Teresa Eguibar
- Torres Guardia
- Úrculo
- Venancio Blanco
- Vicente Ortí
- Xabier Laka
- Xuxo Vázquez

== Sculpture gallery ==
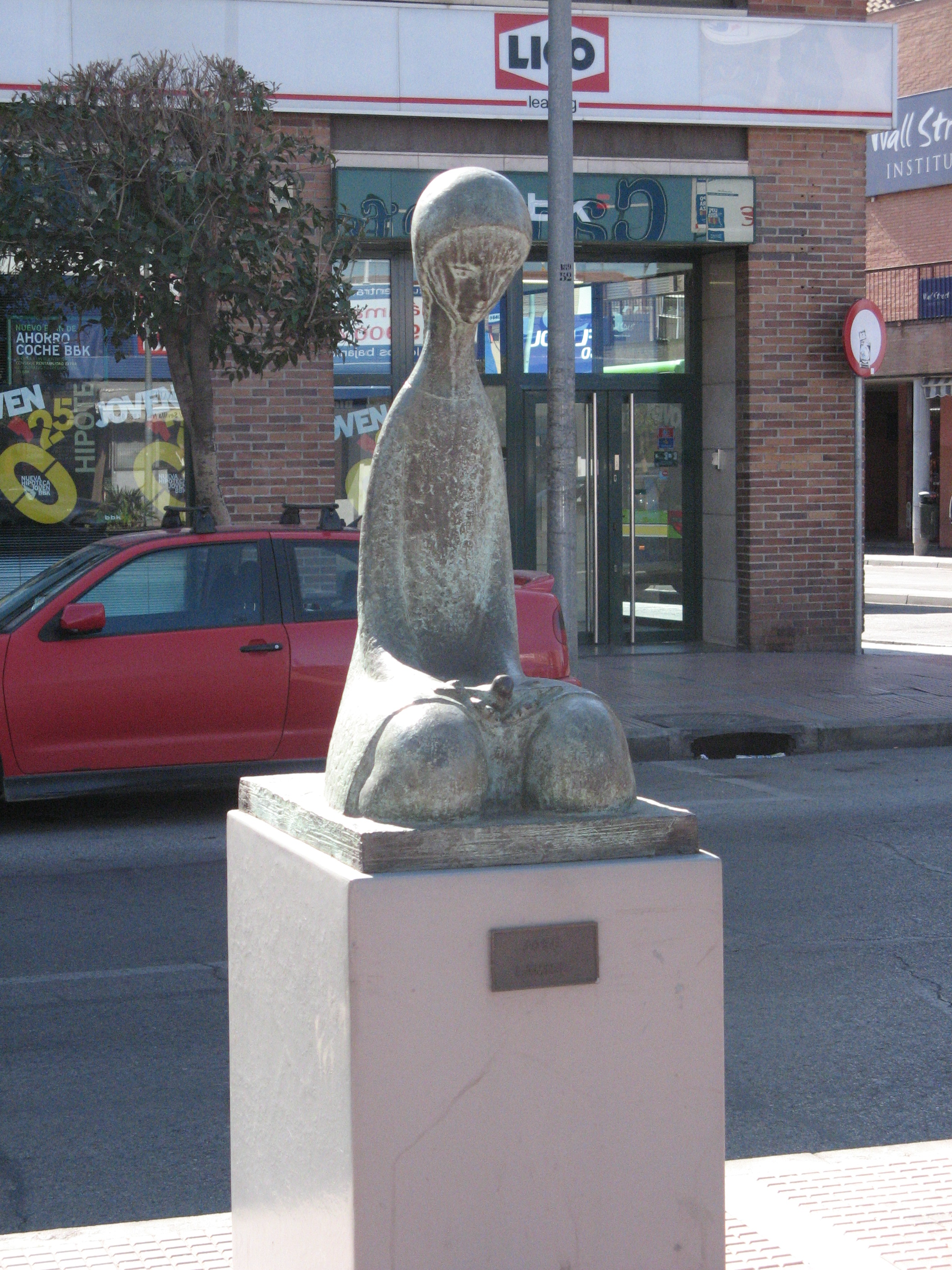
José Lamiel

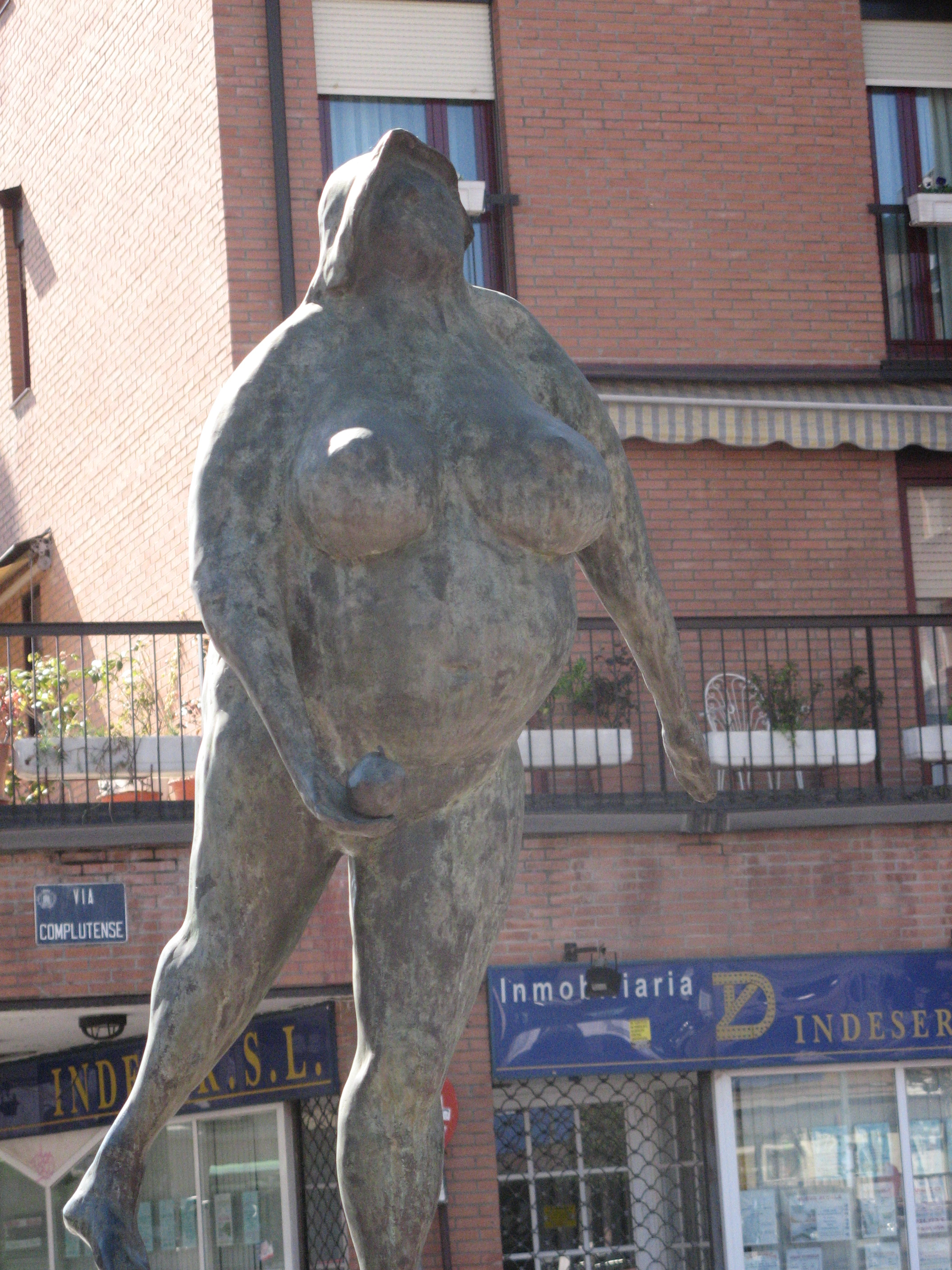
Fernando Suárez

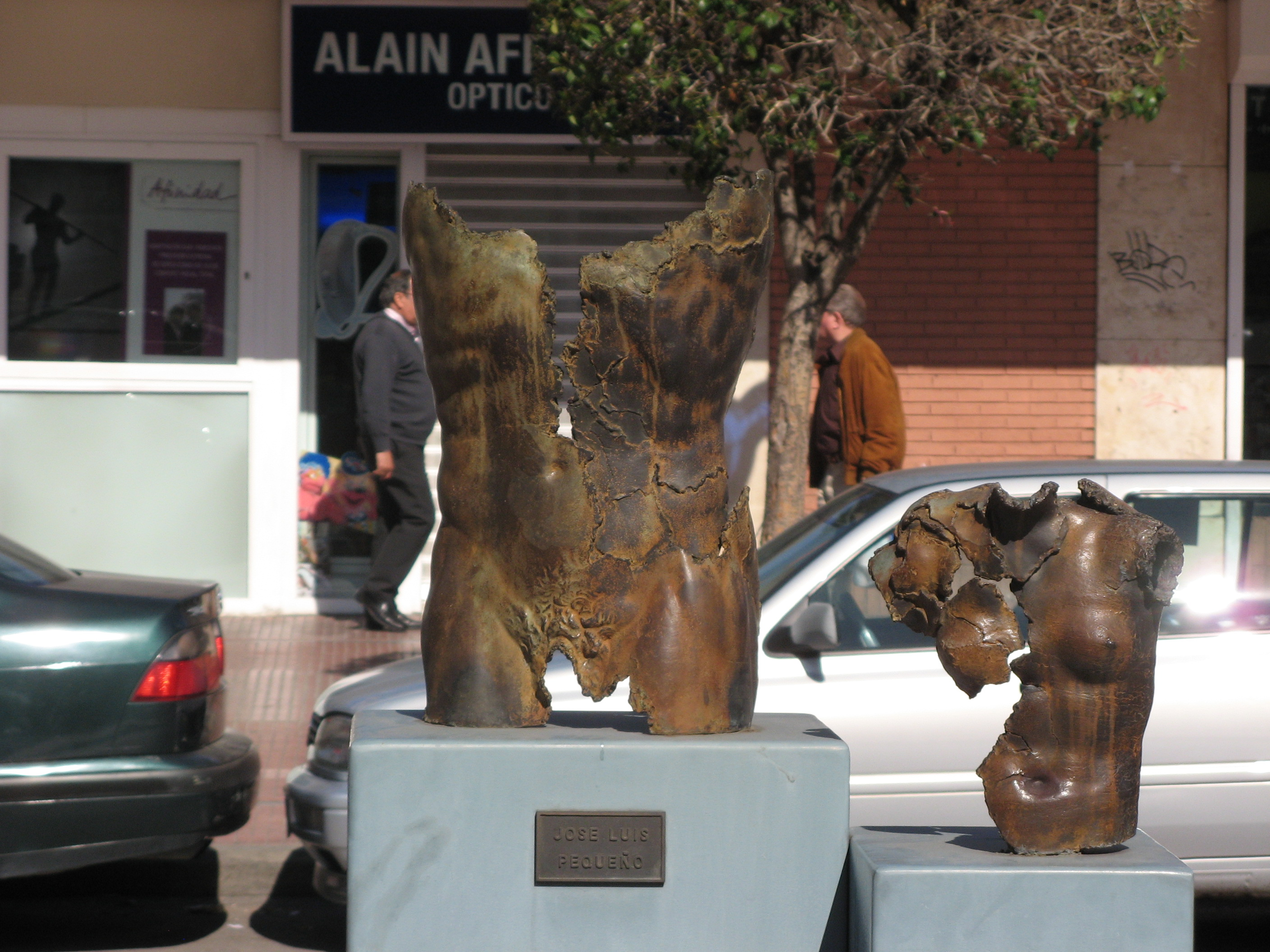
José Luis Pequeño

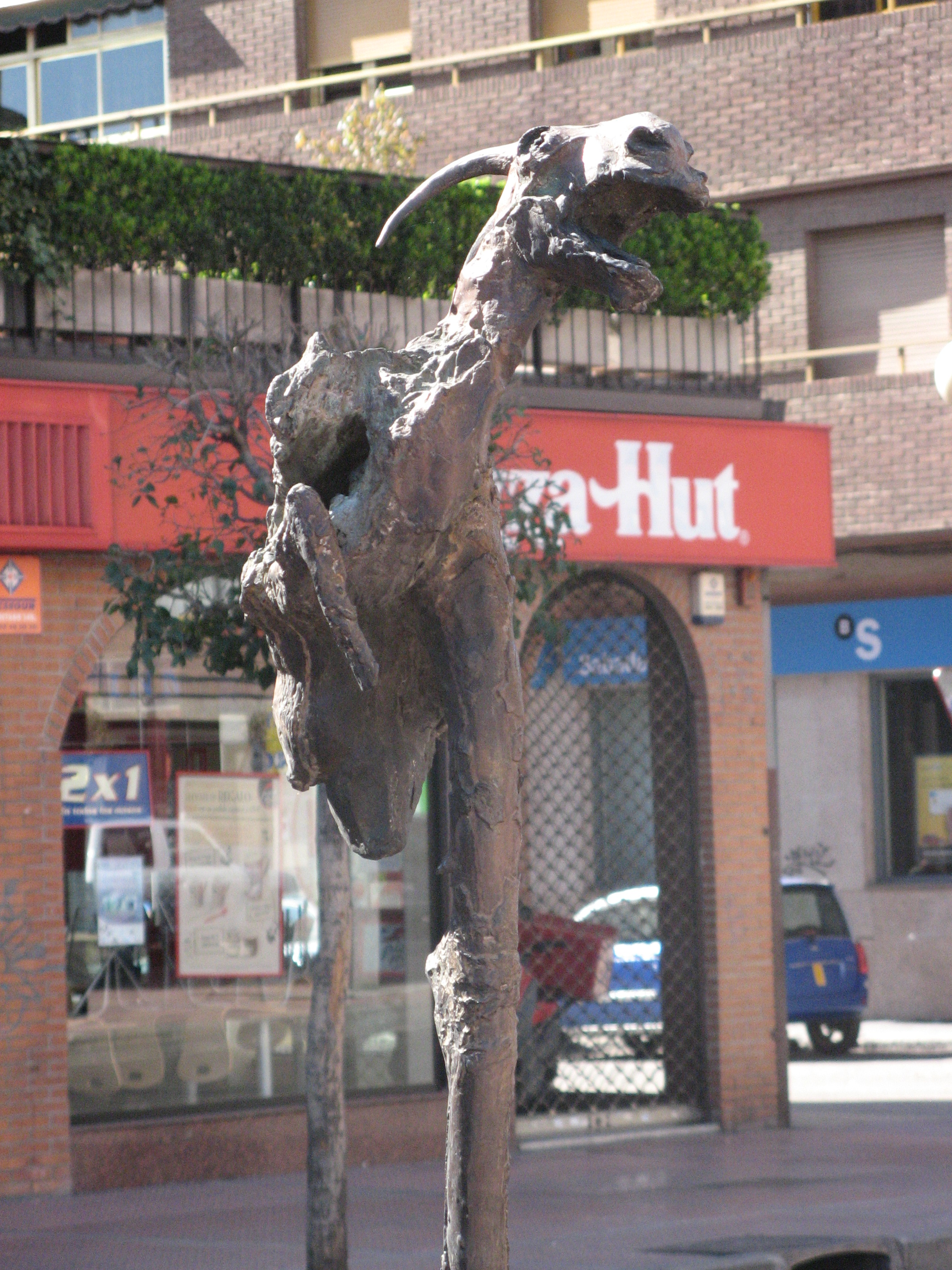
Aurelio Teno

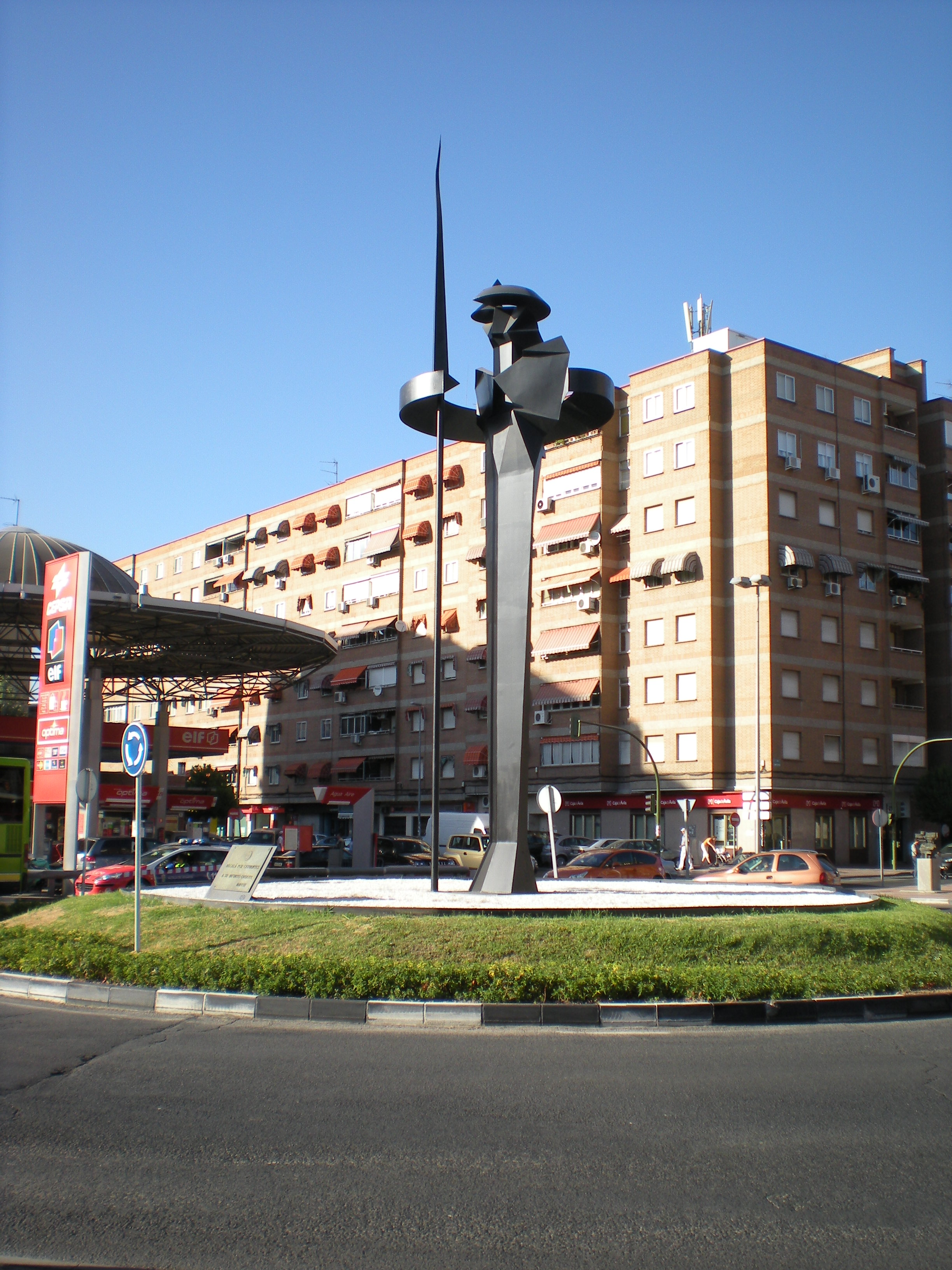
Sebastián.
Quijote (2007)

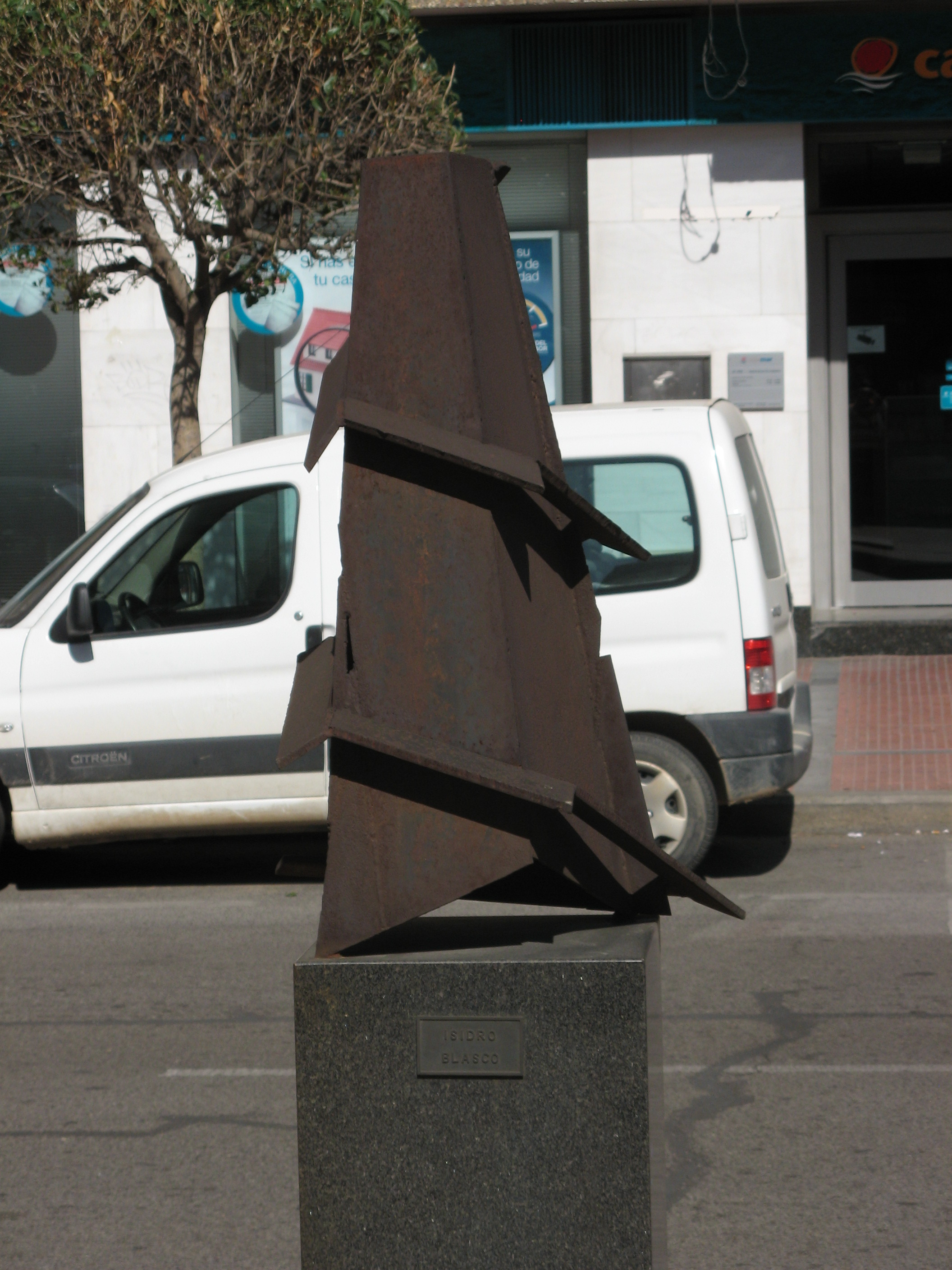
Isidro Blasco

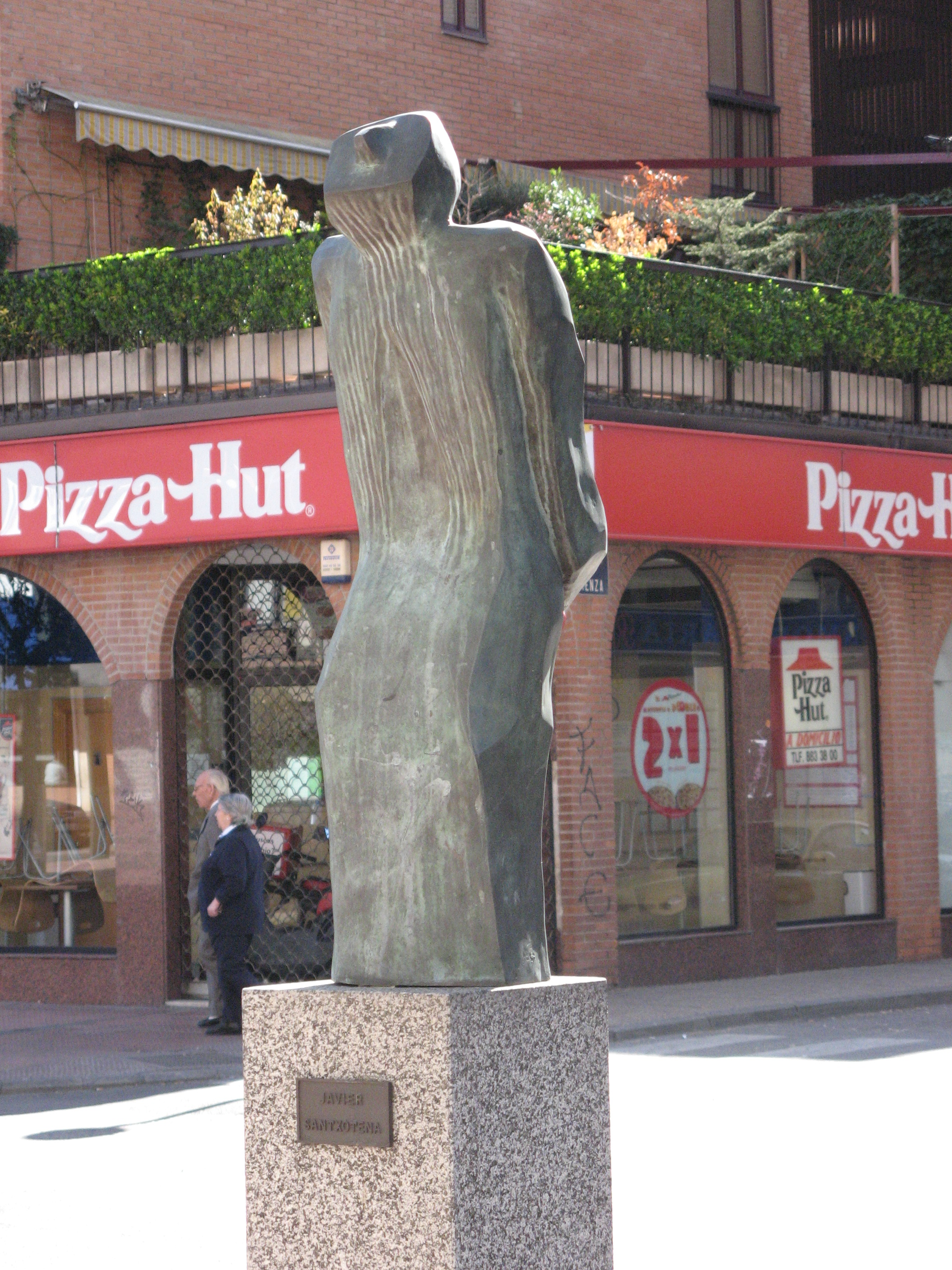
Javier Santxotena

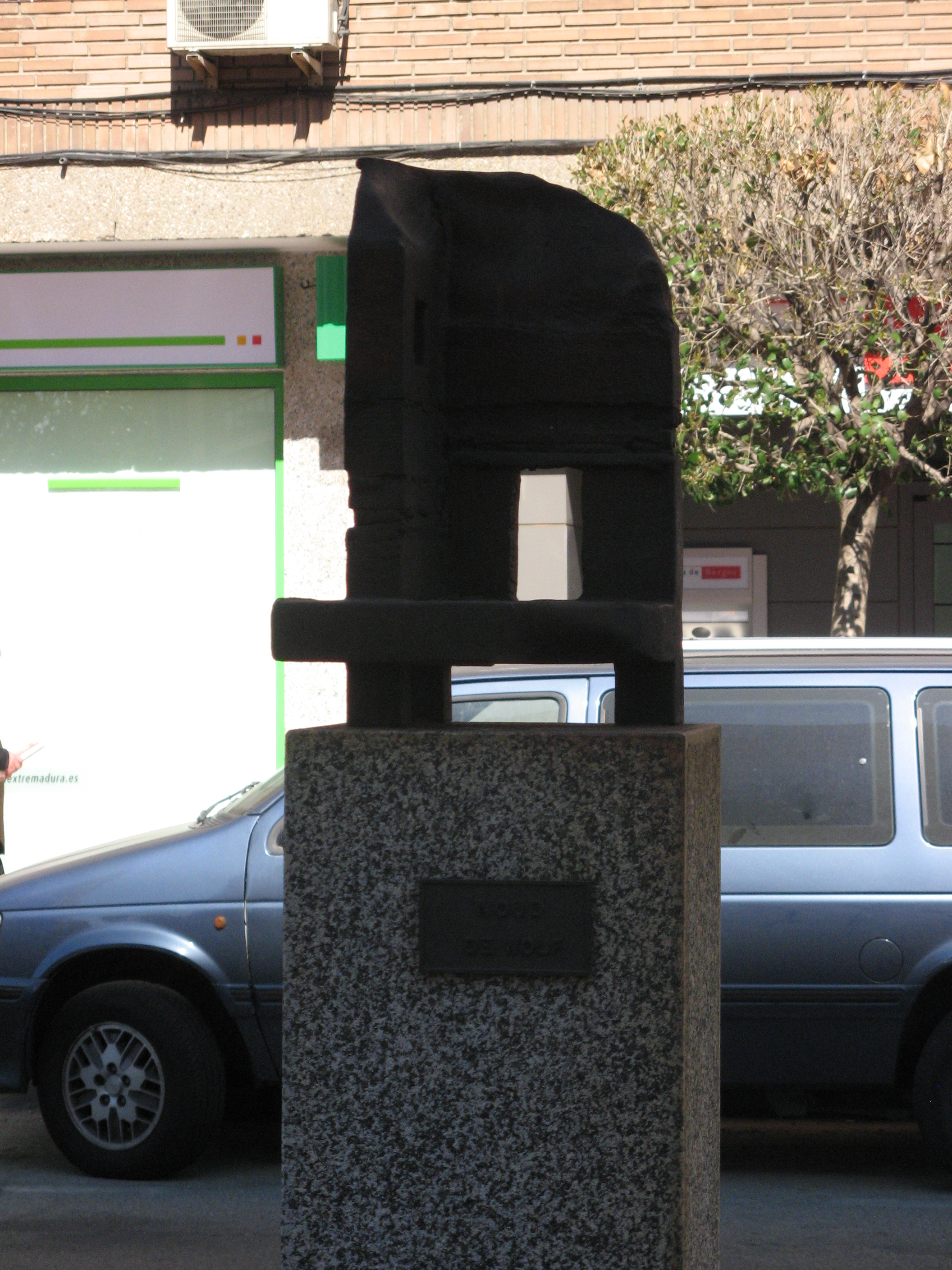
Noud de Wolf

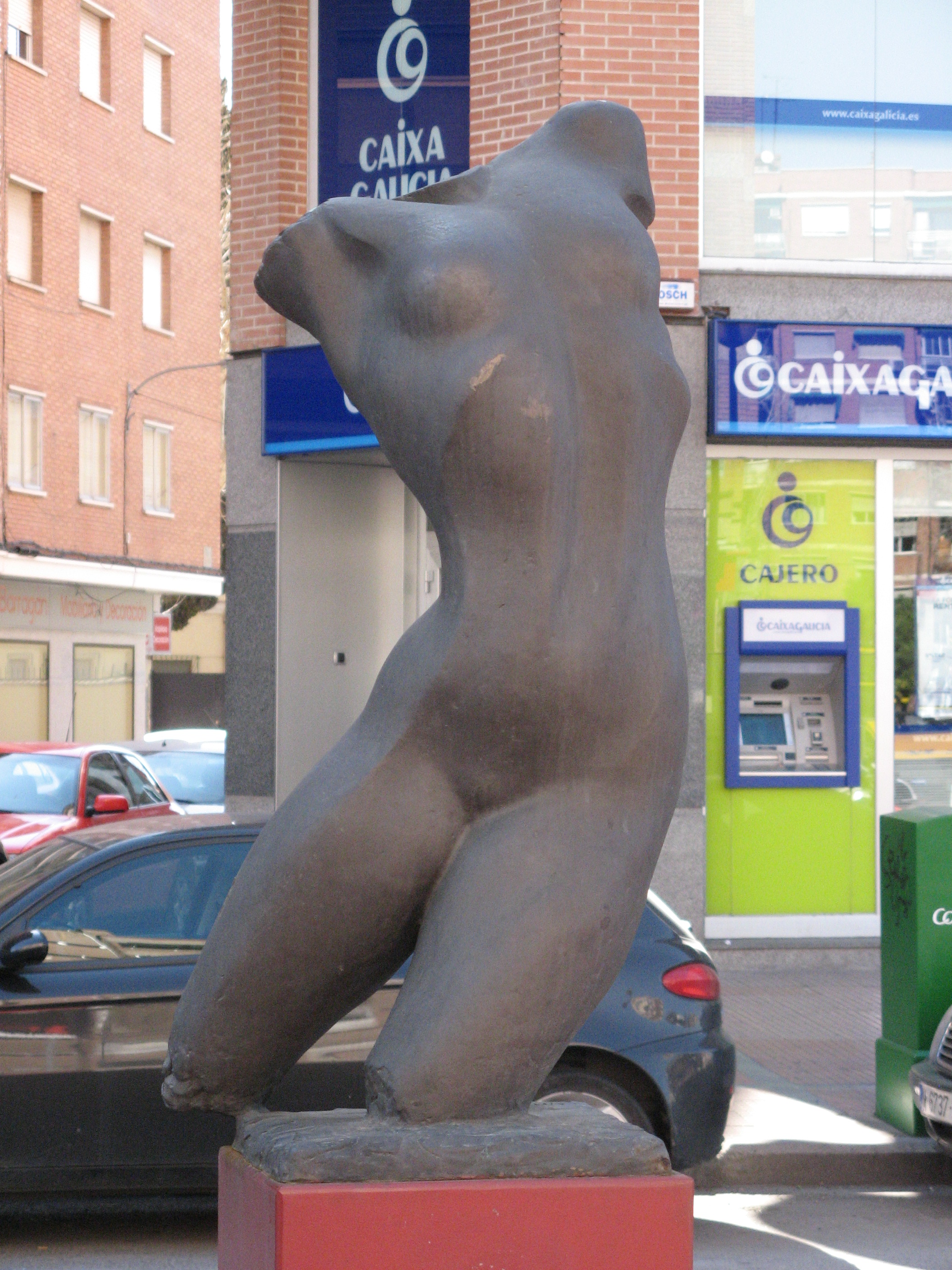
Miguel Moreno

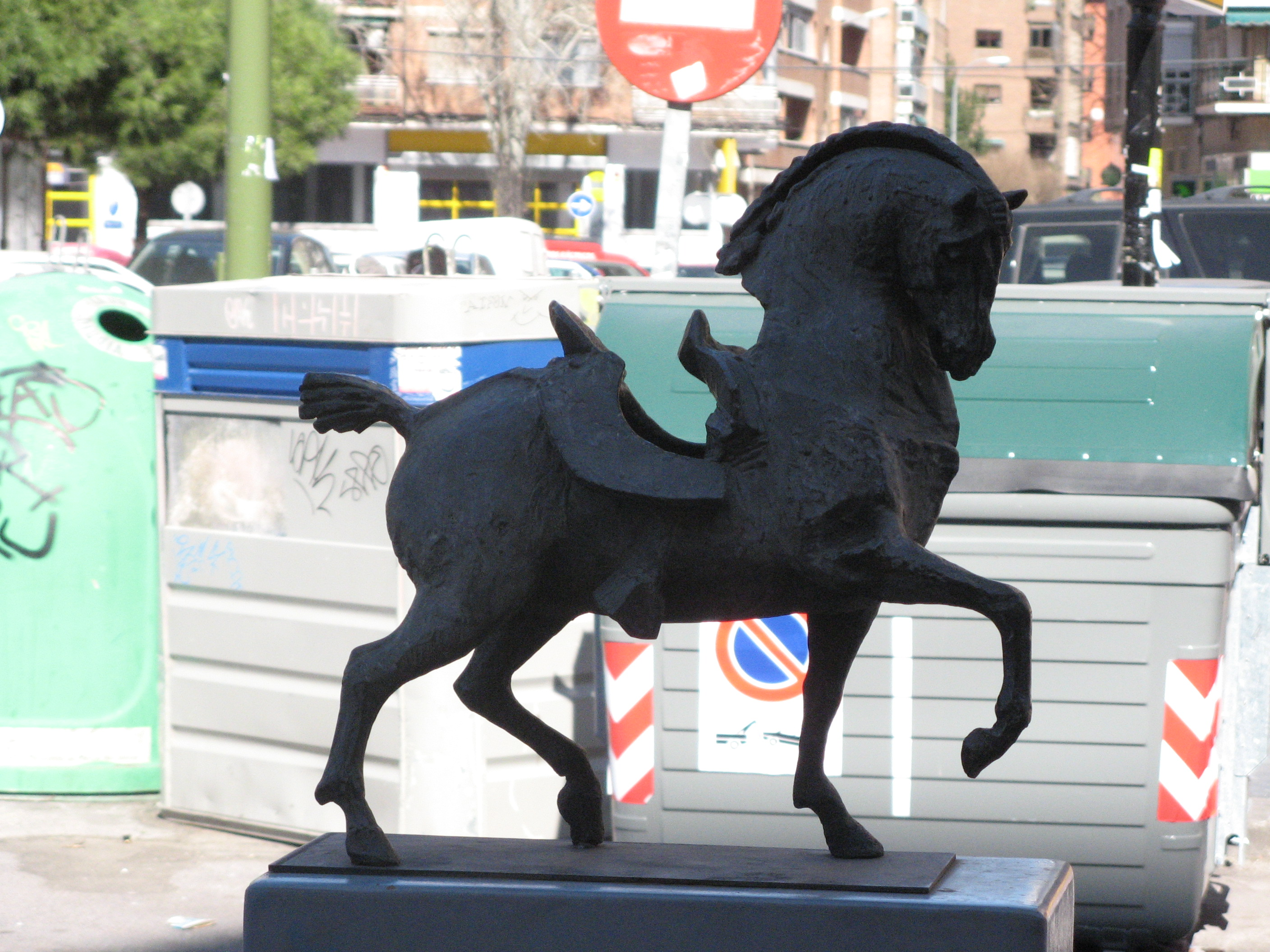
Venancio Blanco

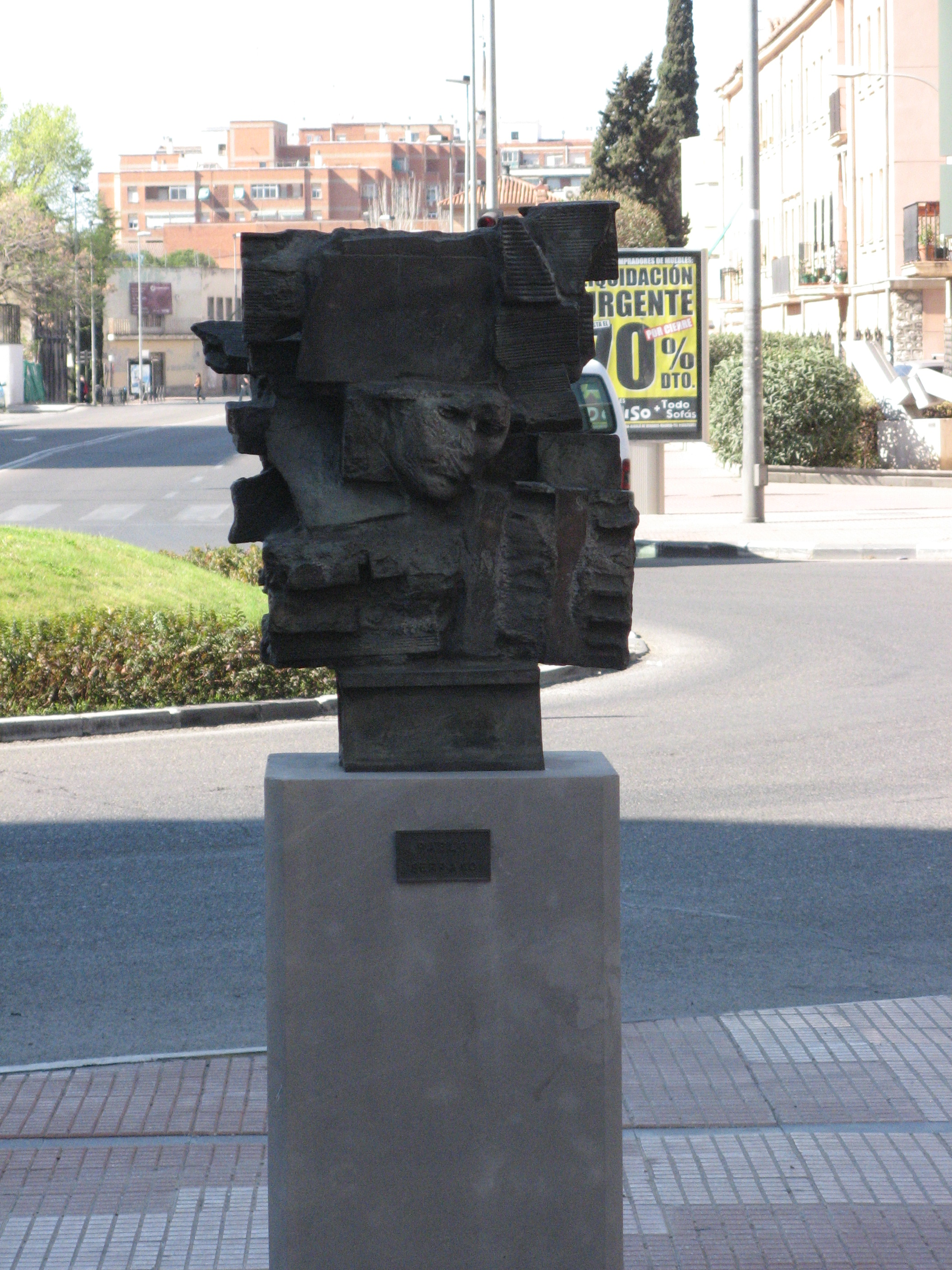
Pablo Serrano

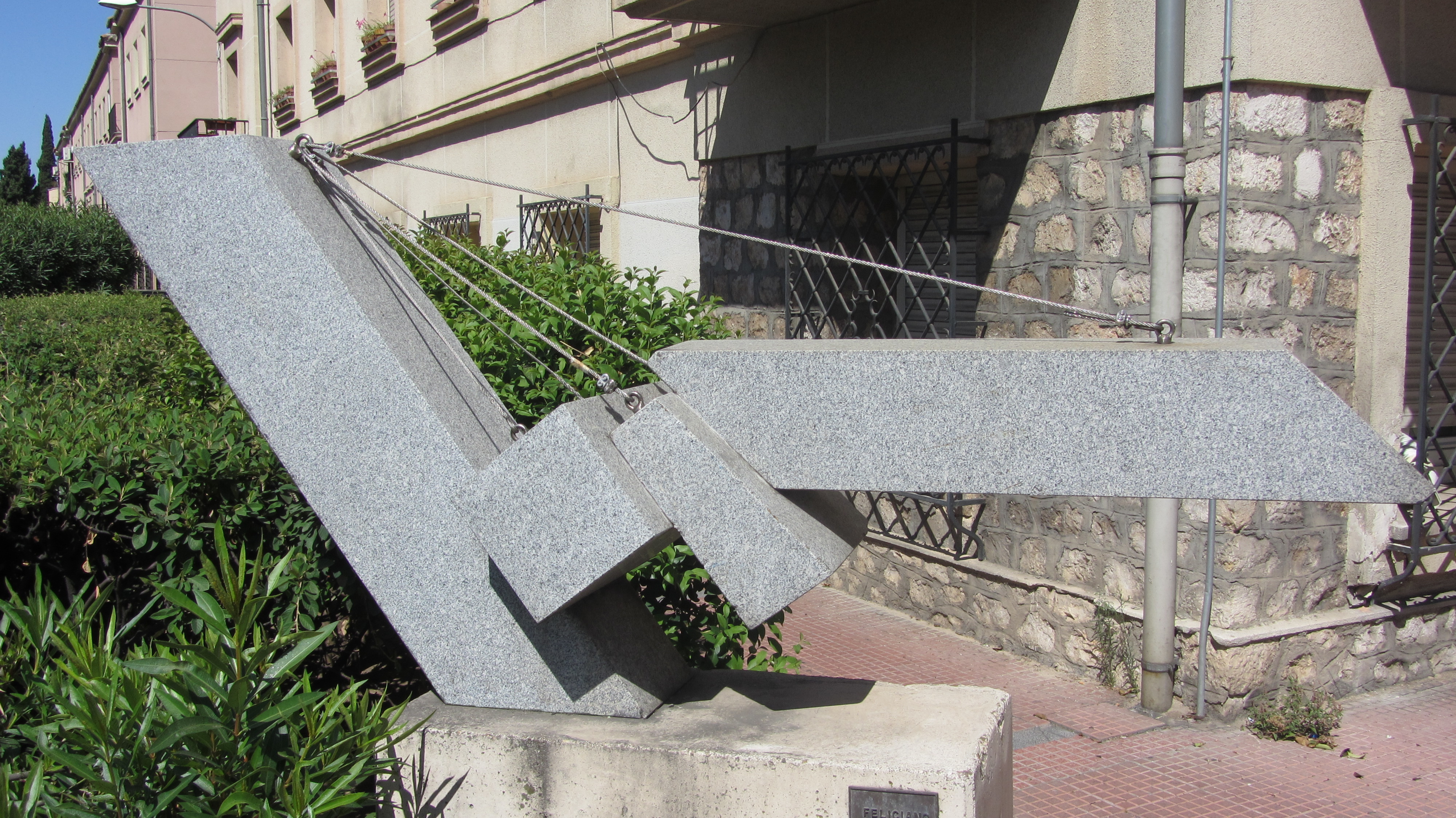
Feliciano

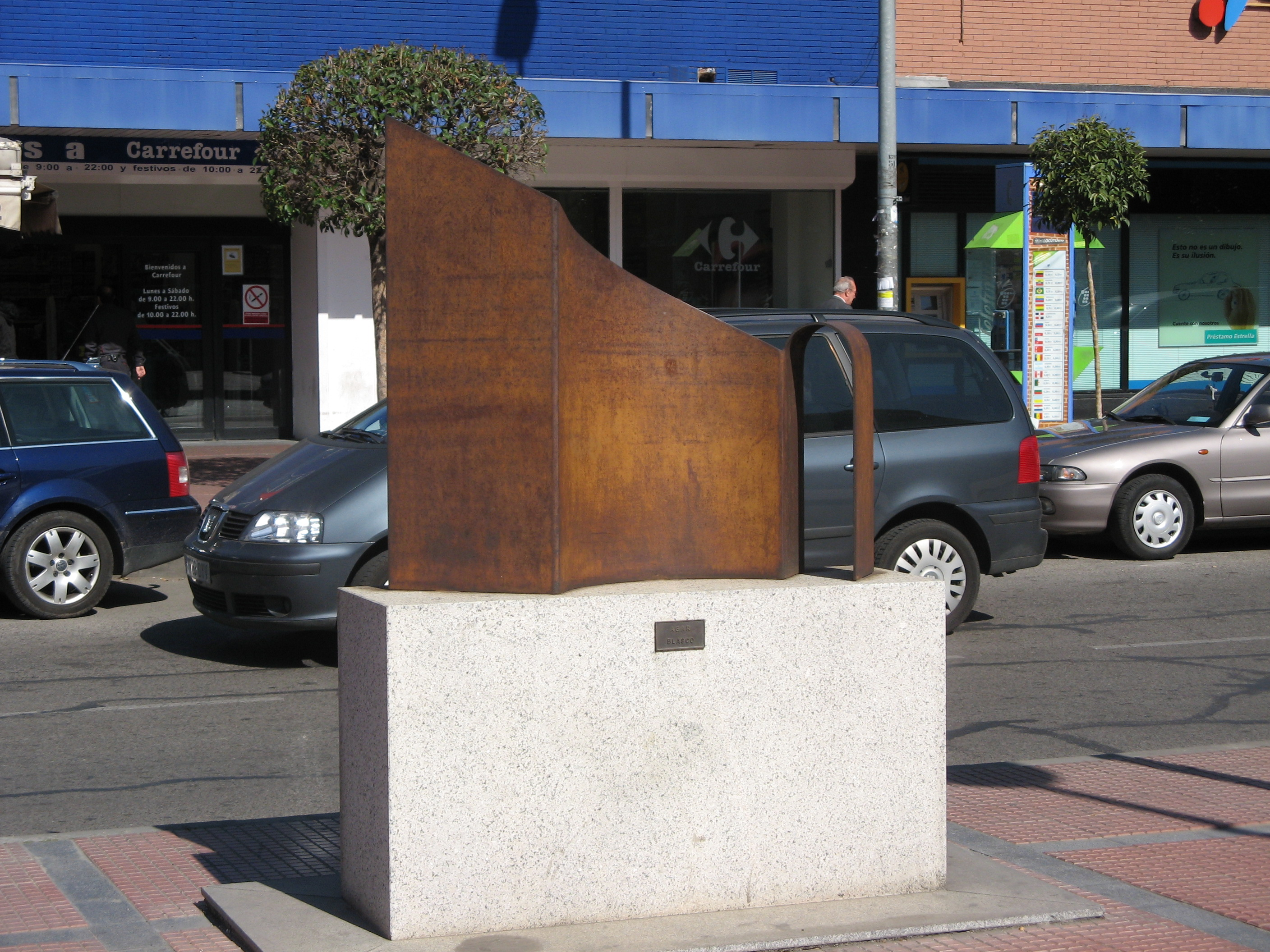
Agar Blasco

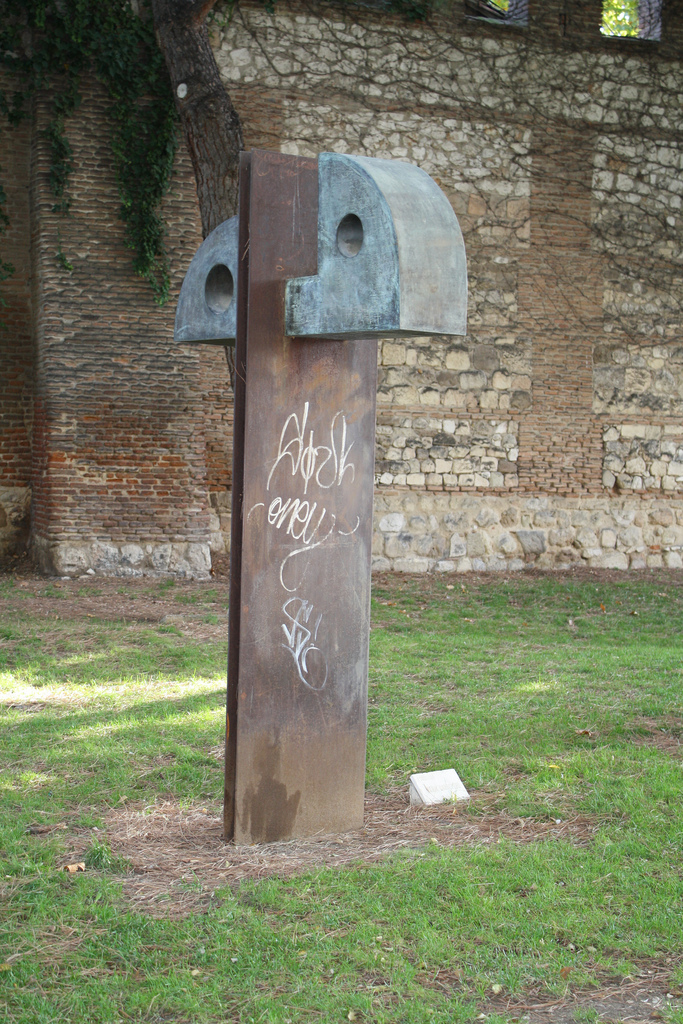
María Carretero.
Pareja de Salvador (1993)

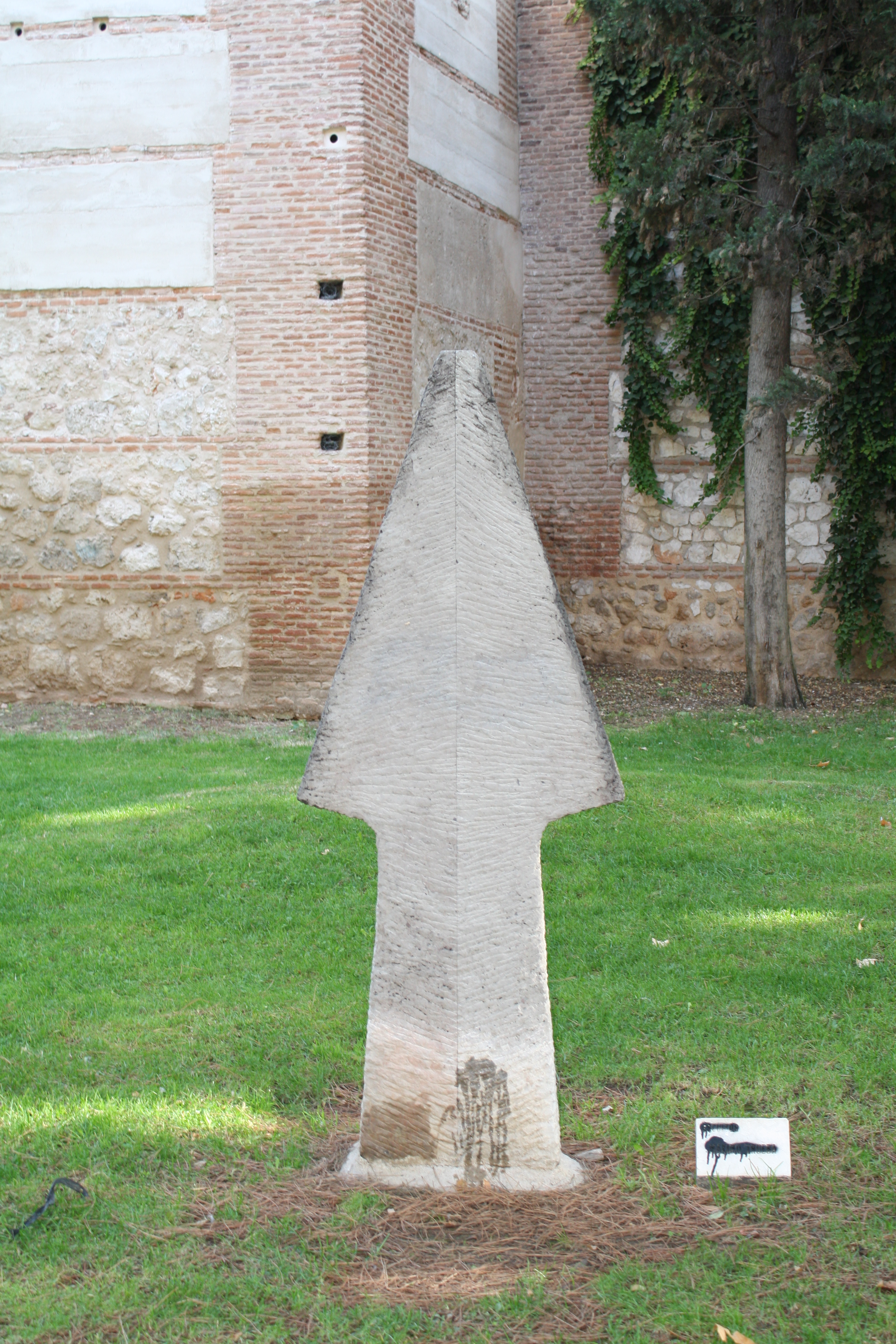
Máximo Trueba

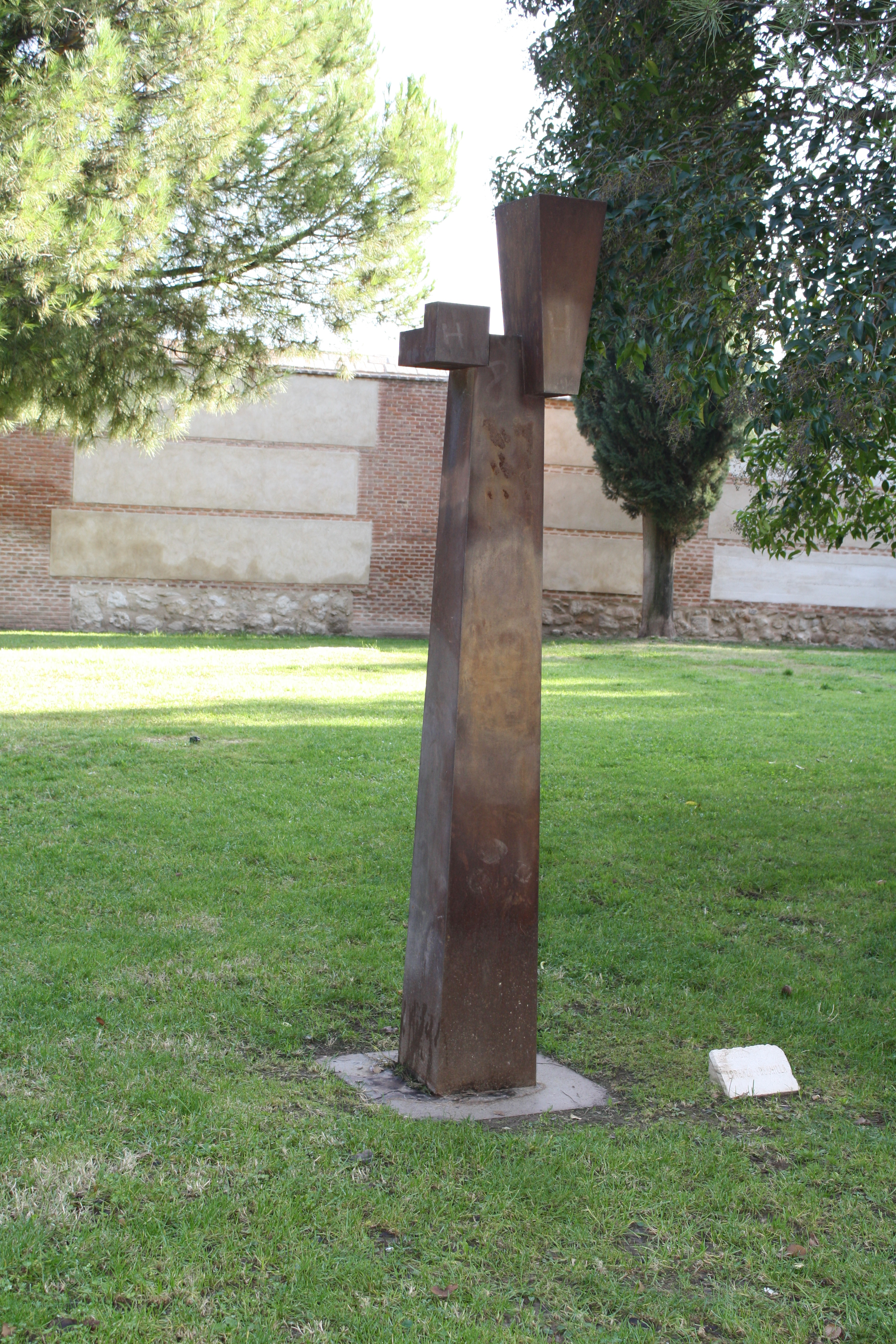
Lorenzo Frechilla

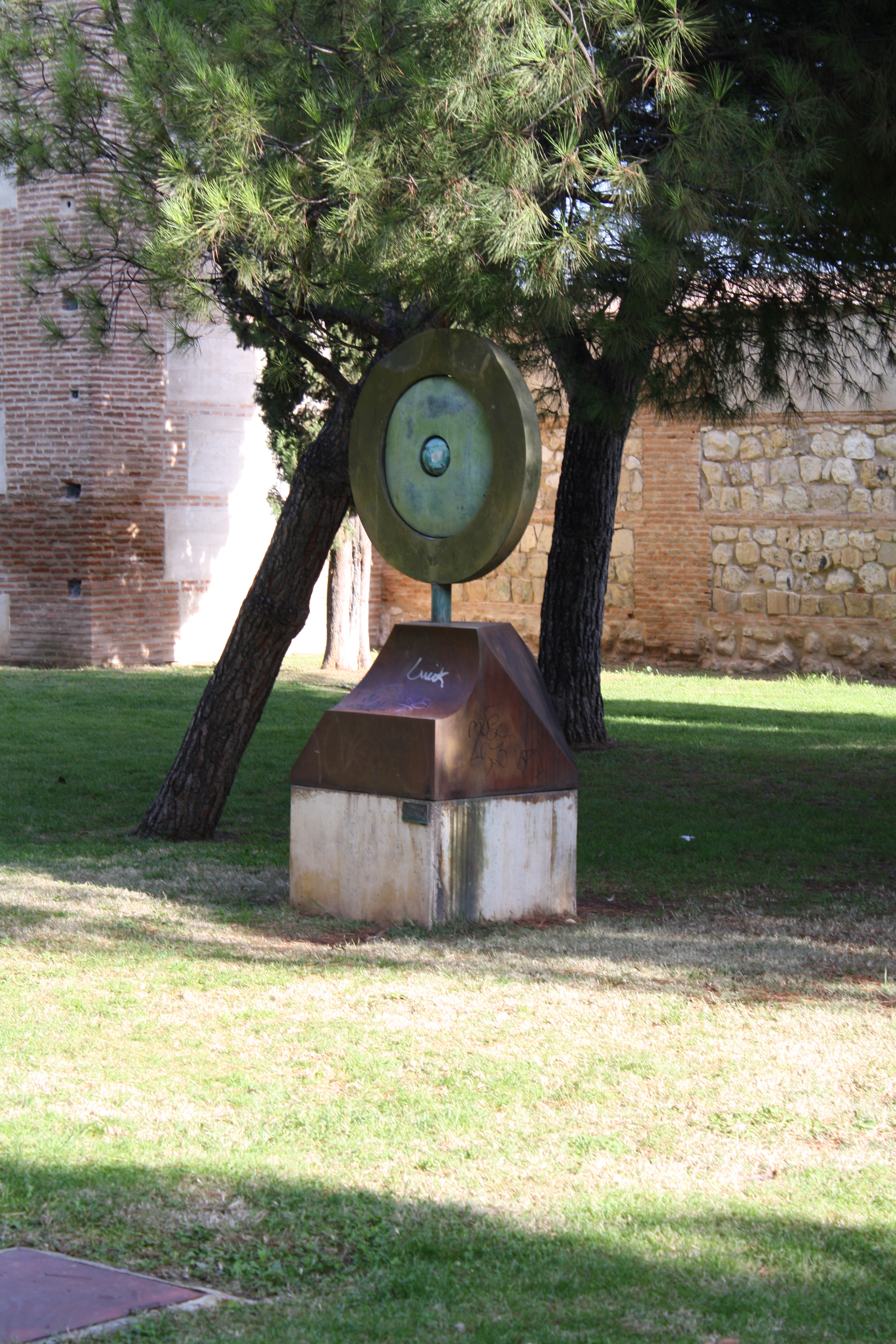
Torres Guardia

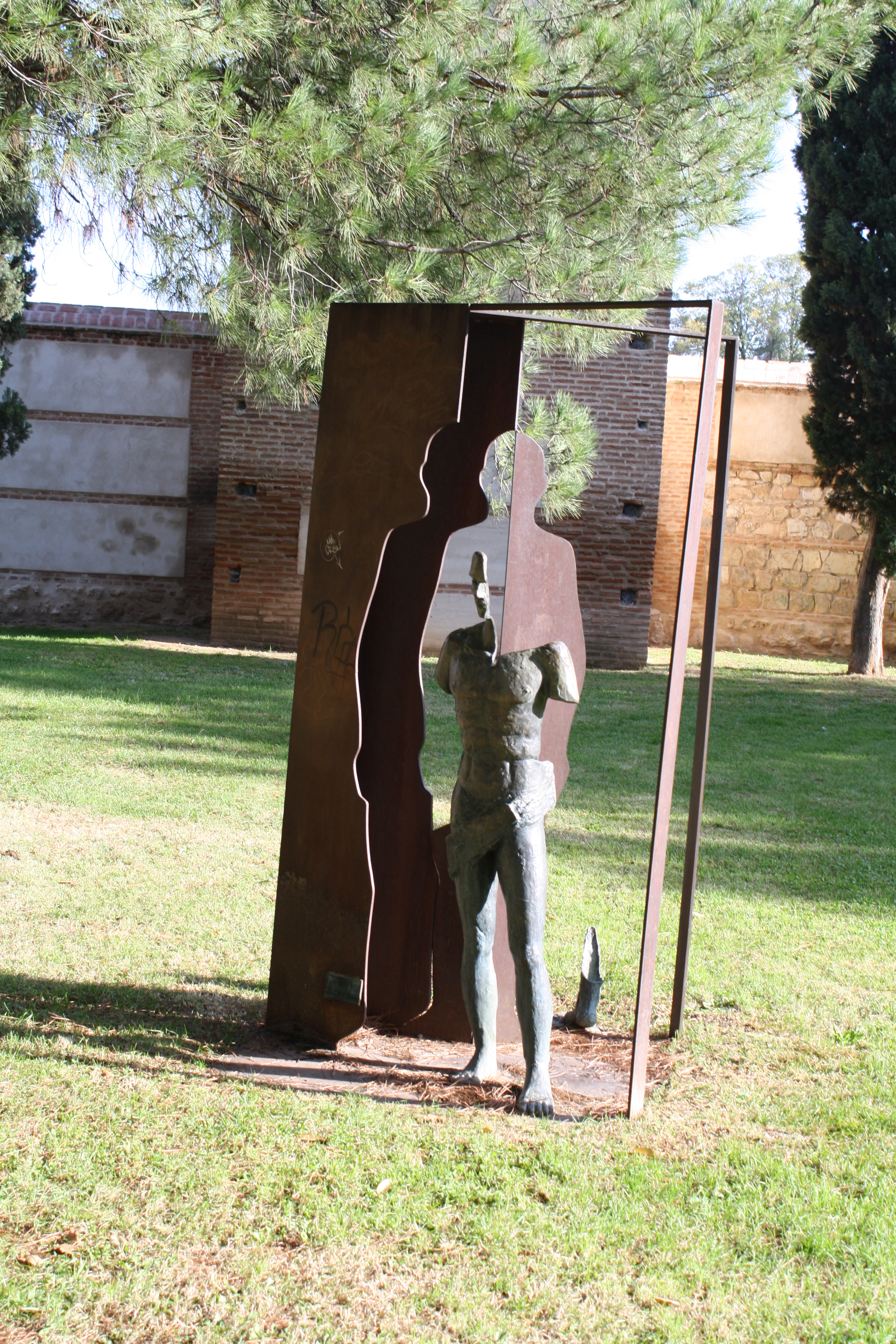
Enrique Ramos Guerra

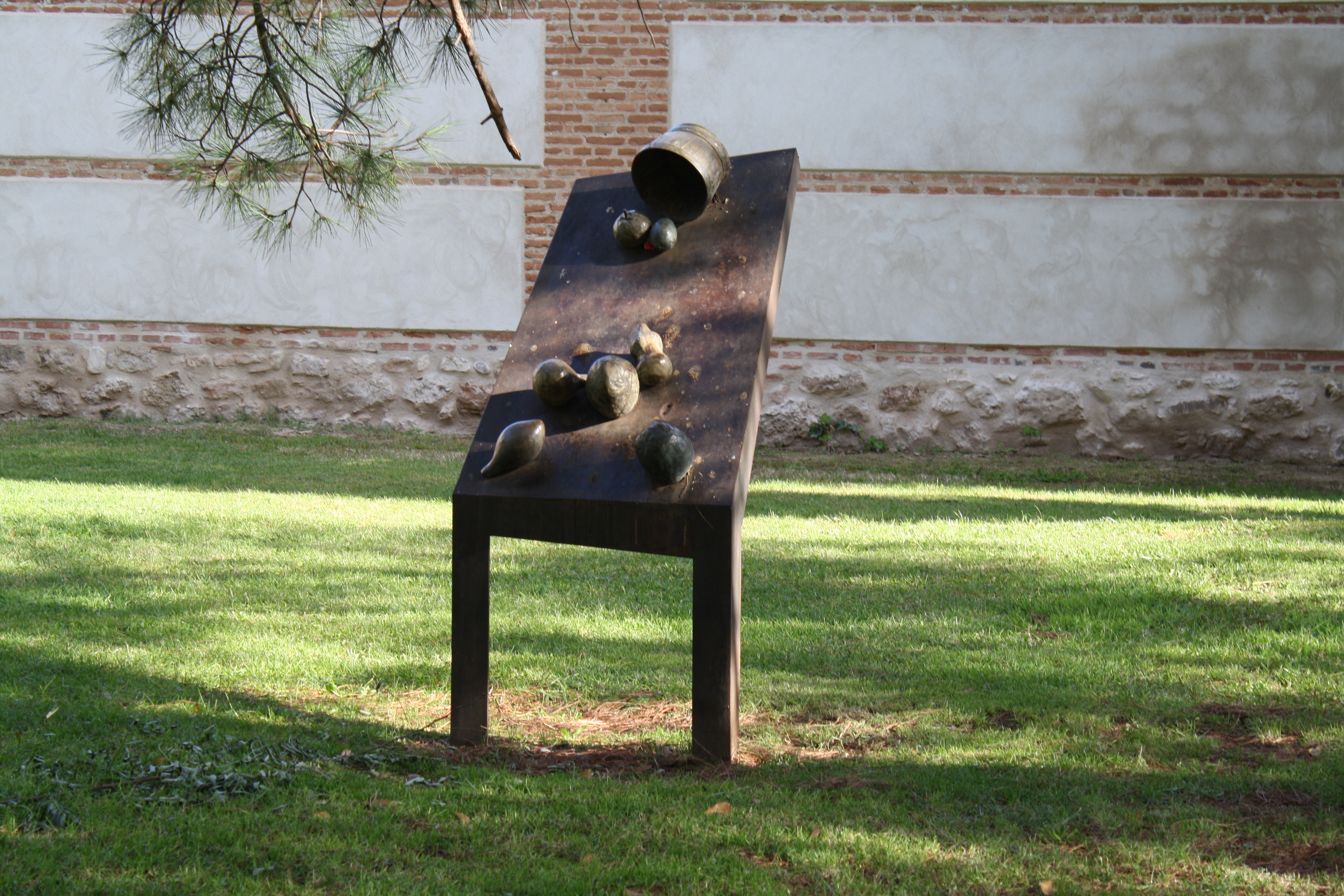
Ramiro Arango

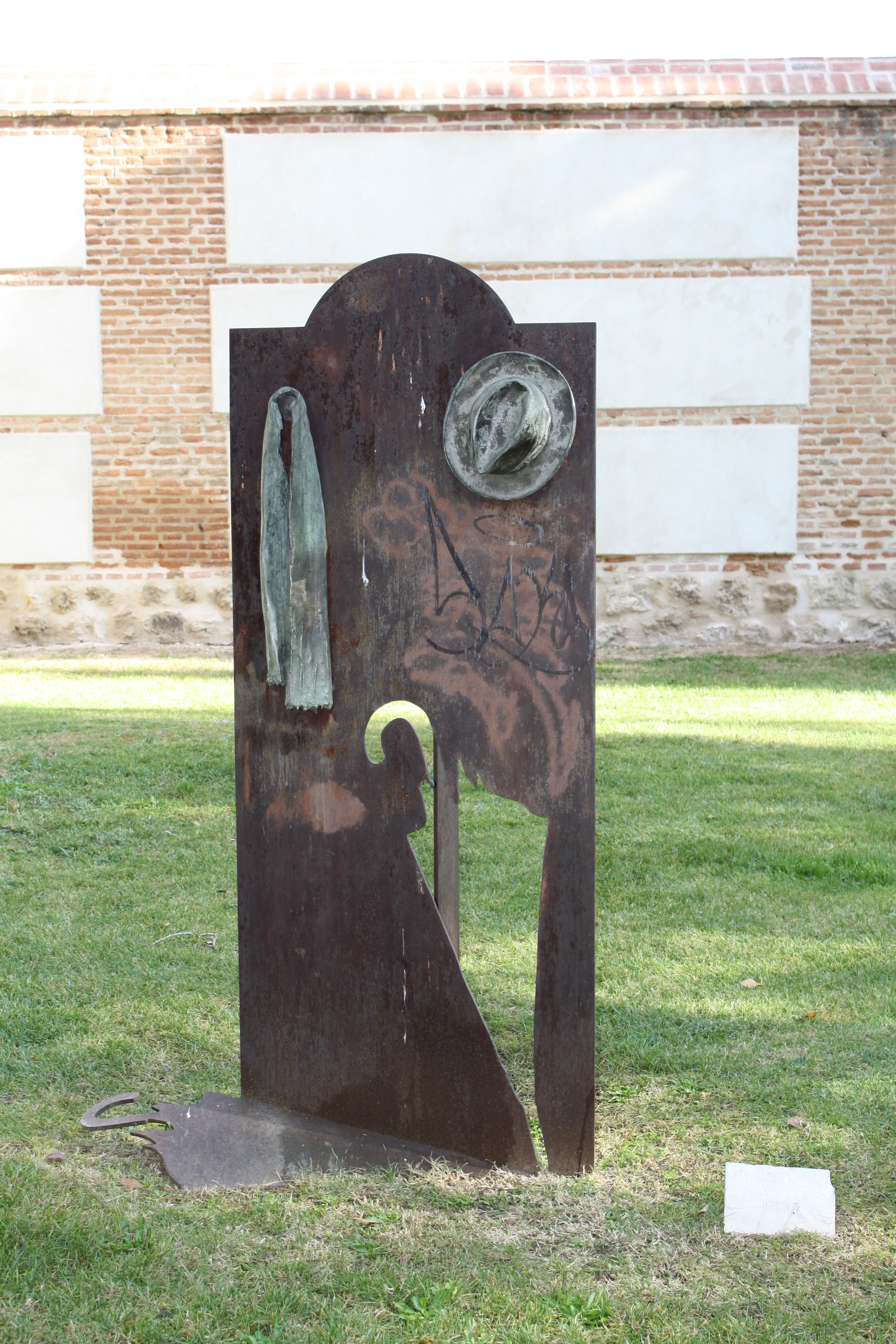
Úrculo

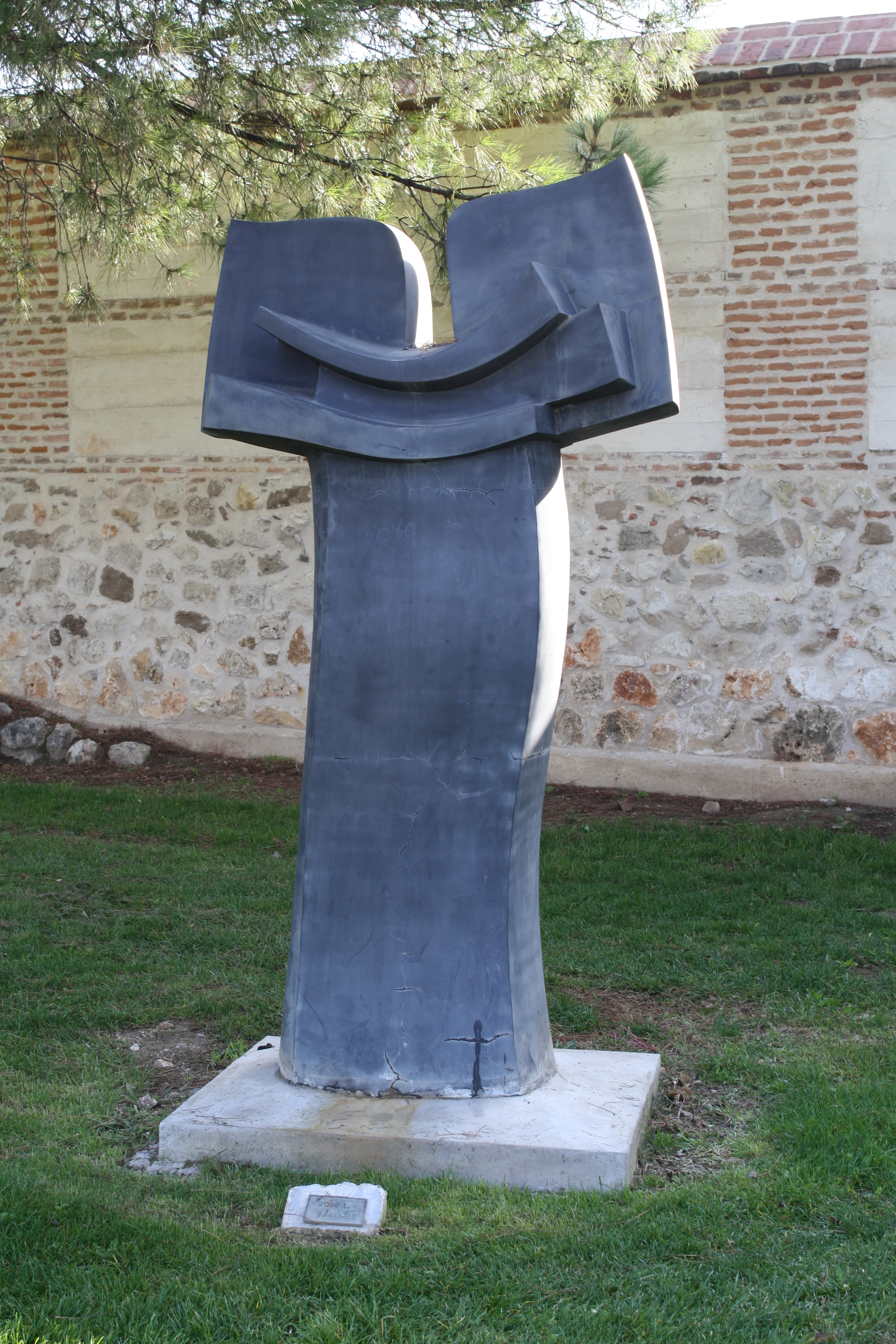
José Luis Sánchez

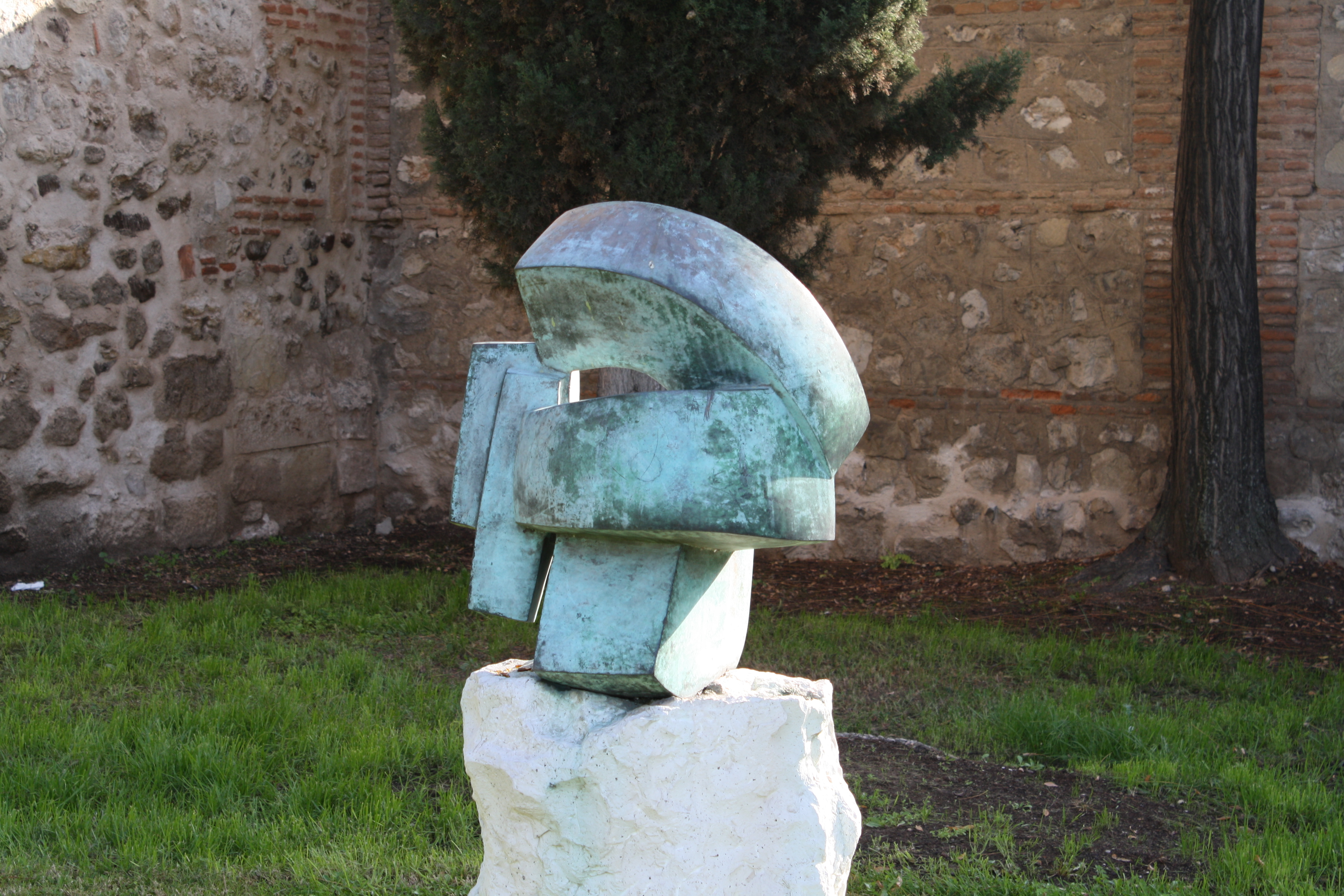
Francisco Barón

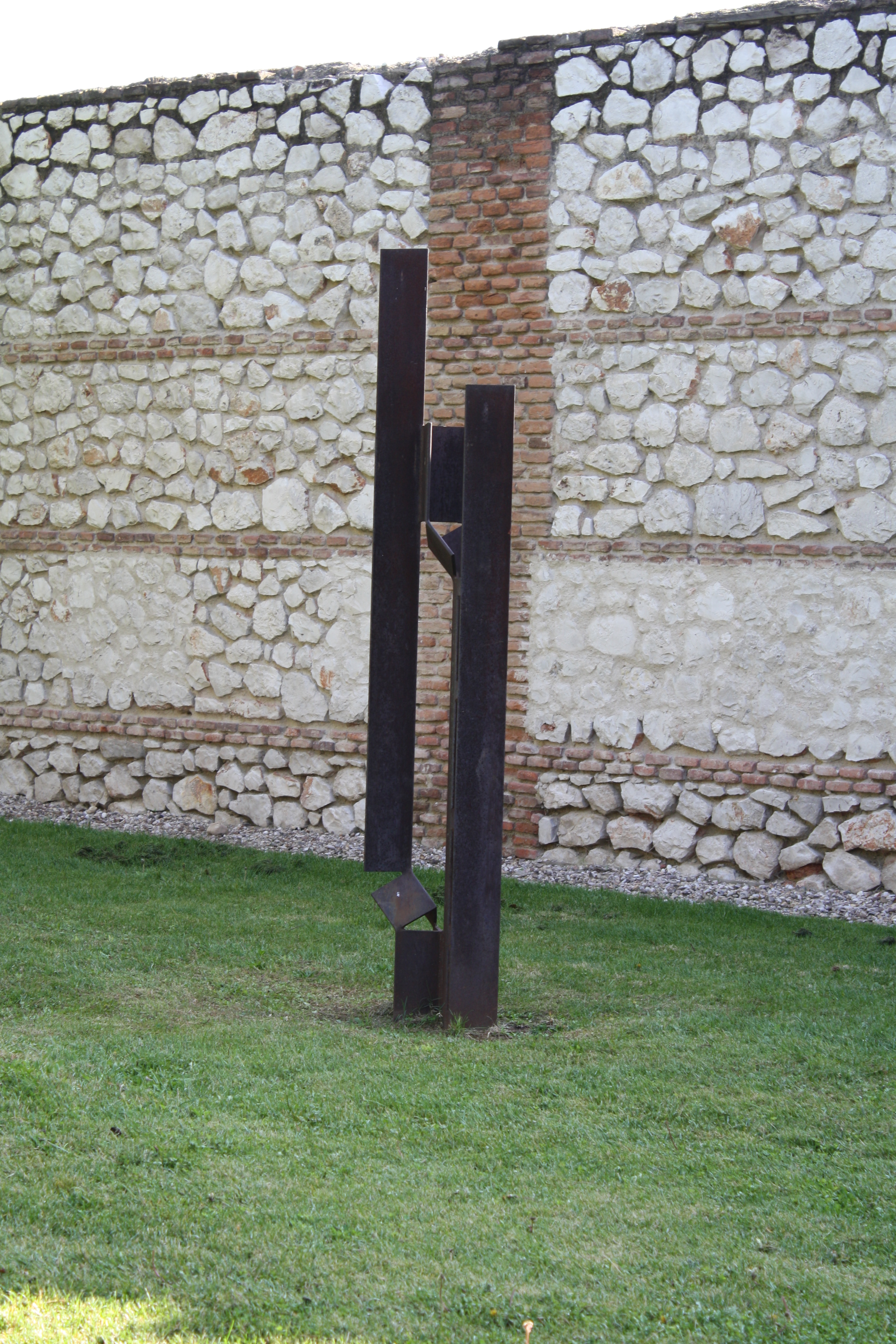
Camín

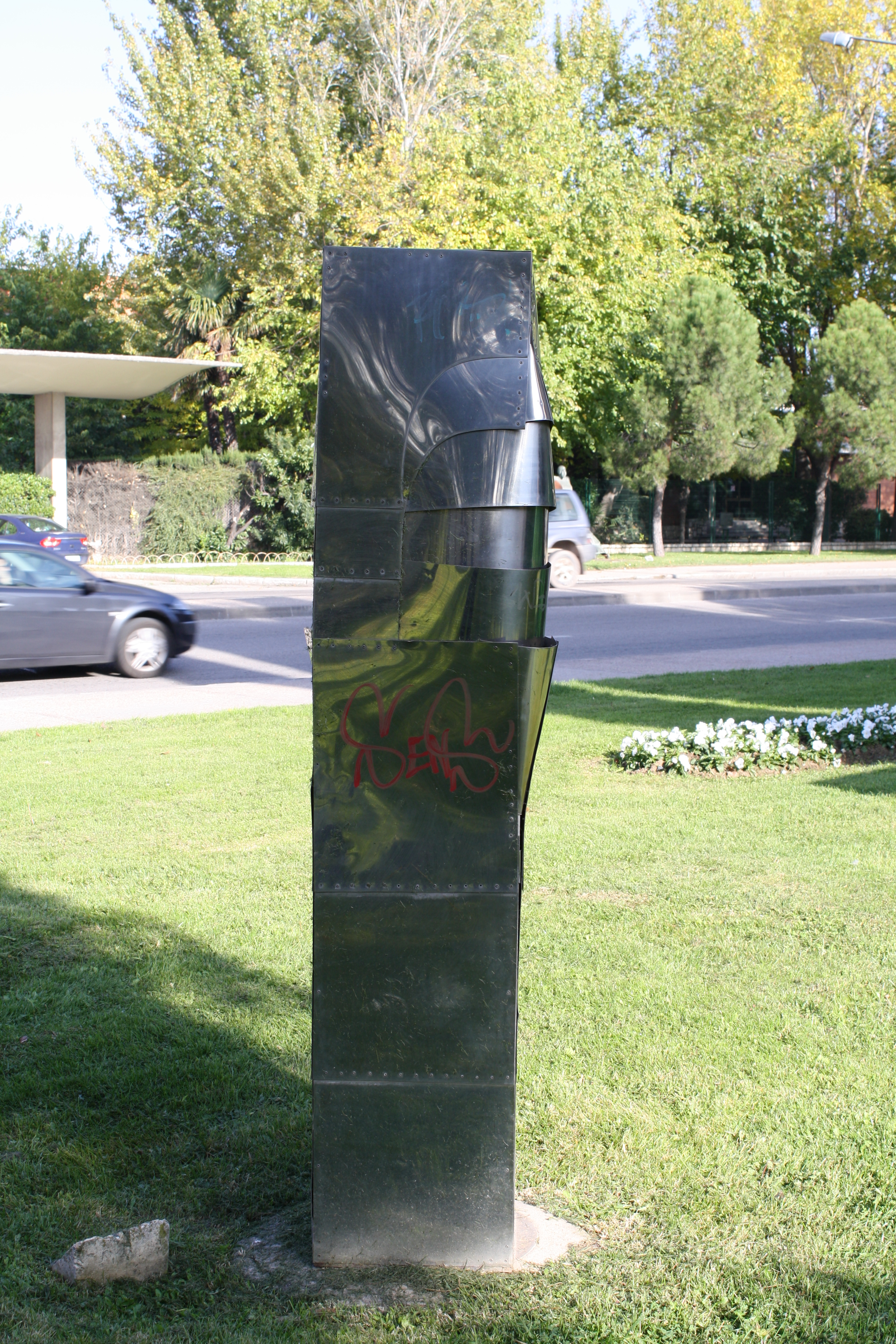
Amadeo Gabino

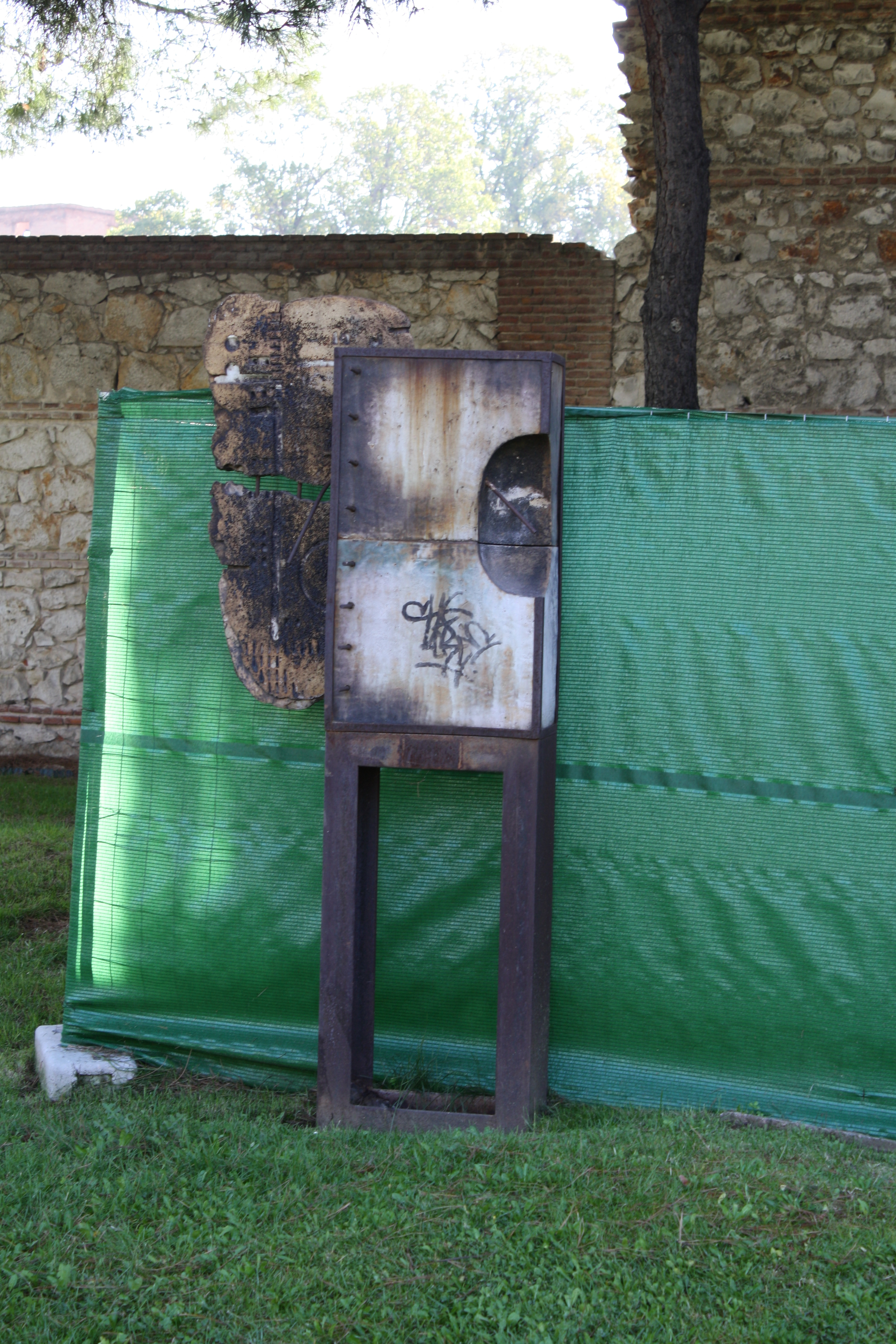
Joan Llacer

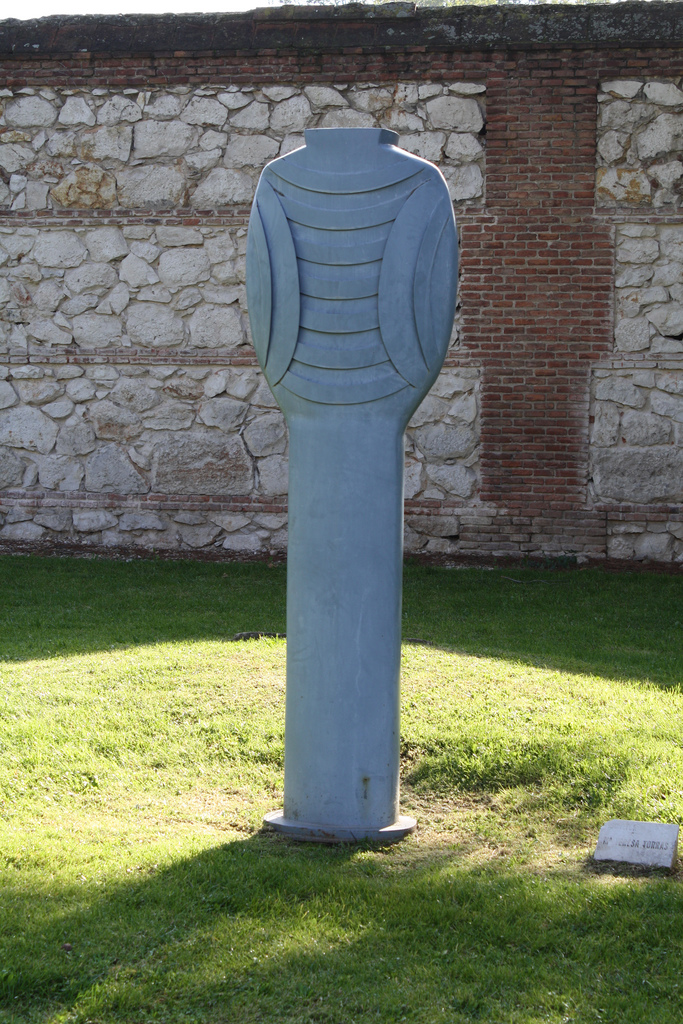
María Teresa Torras

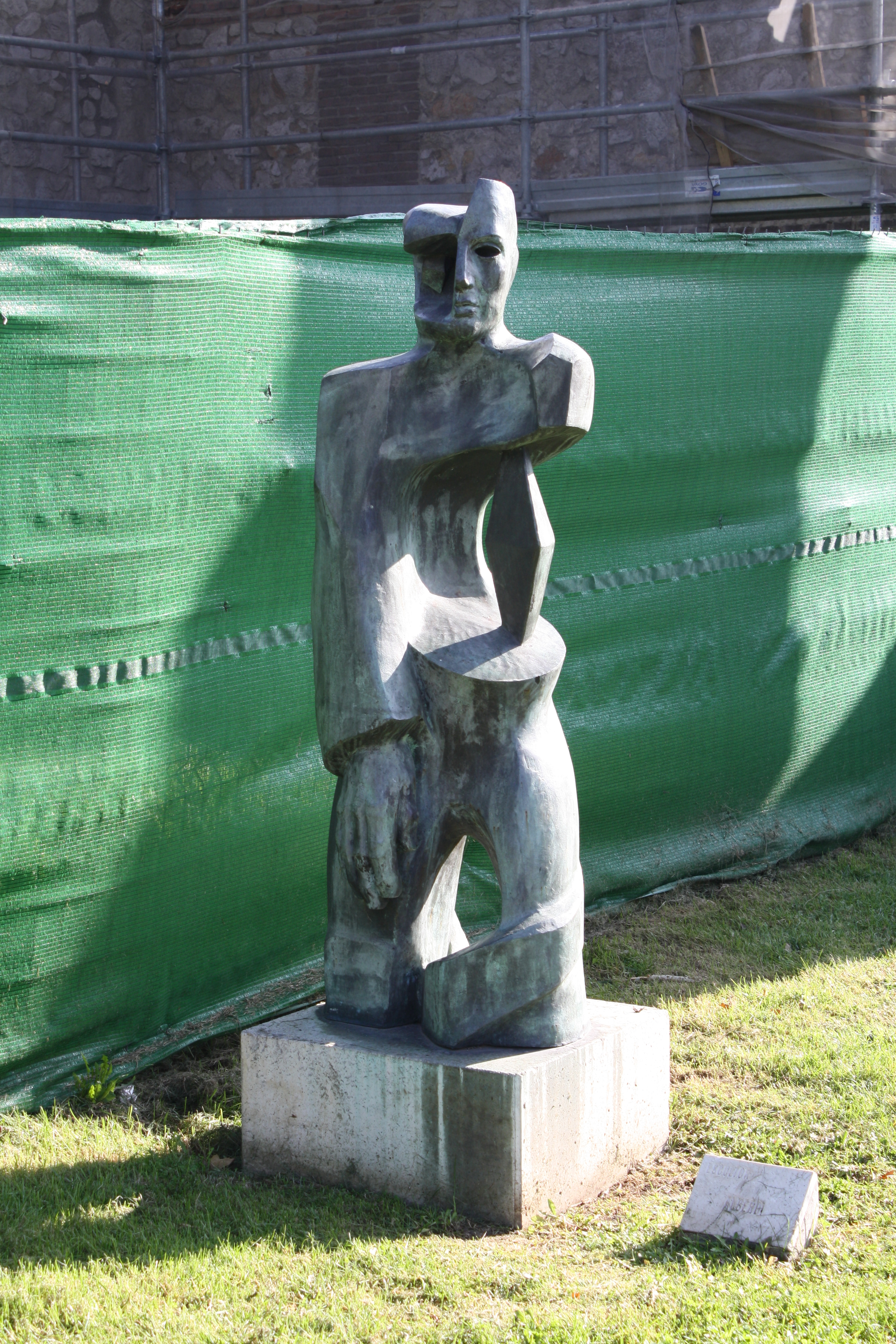
José Manuel Alberdi

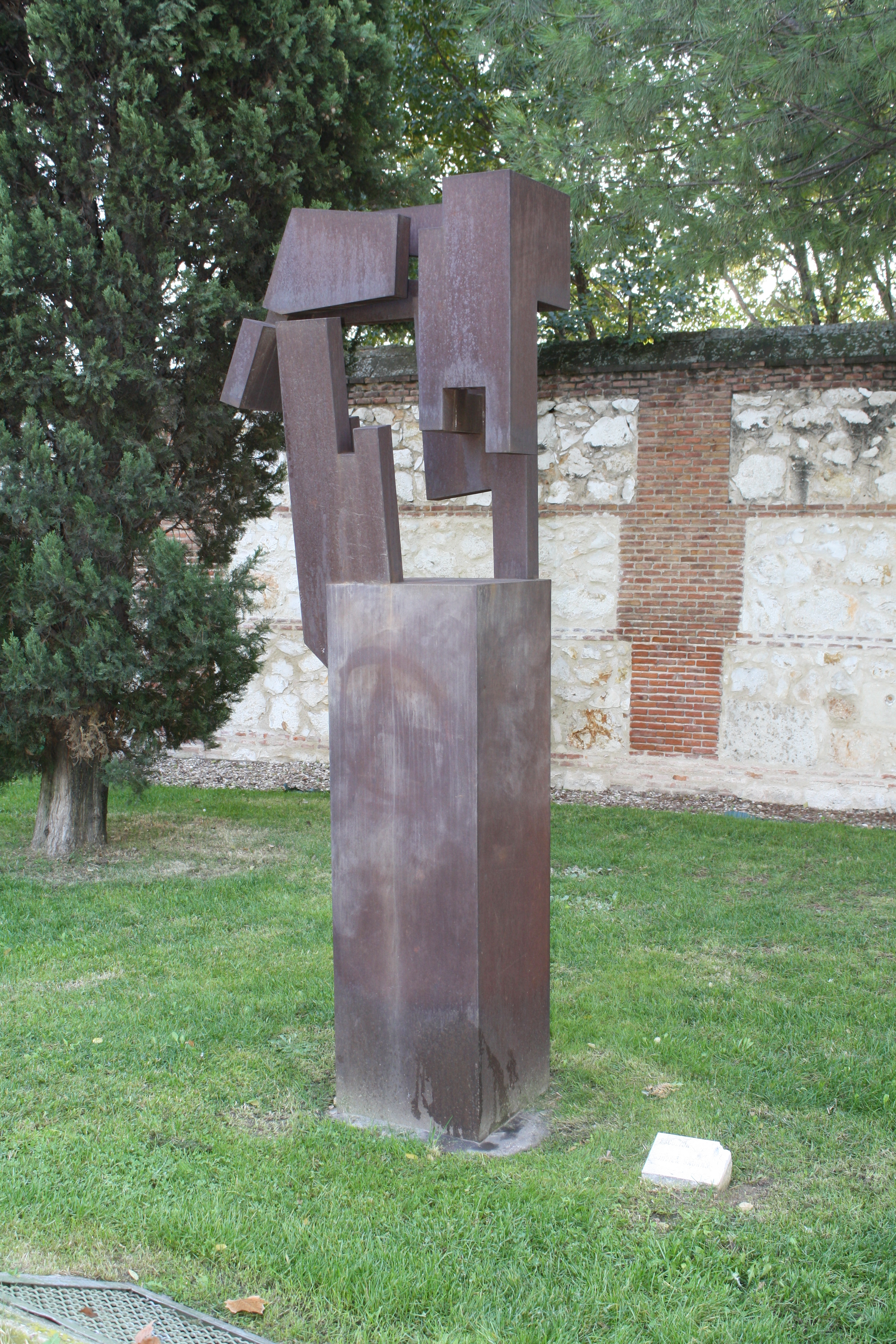
Javier Sauras.
El Poder de la Cifra (1993)

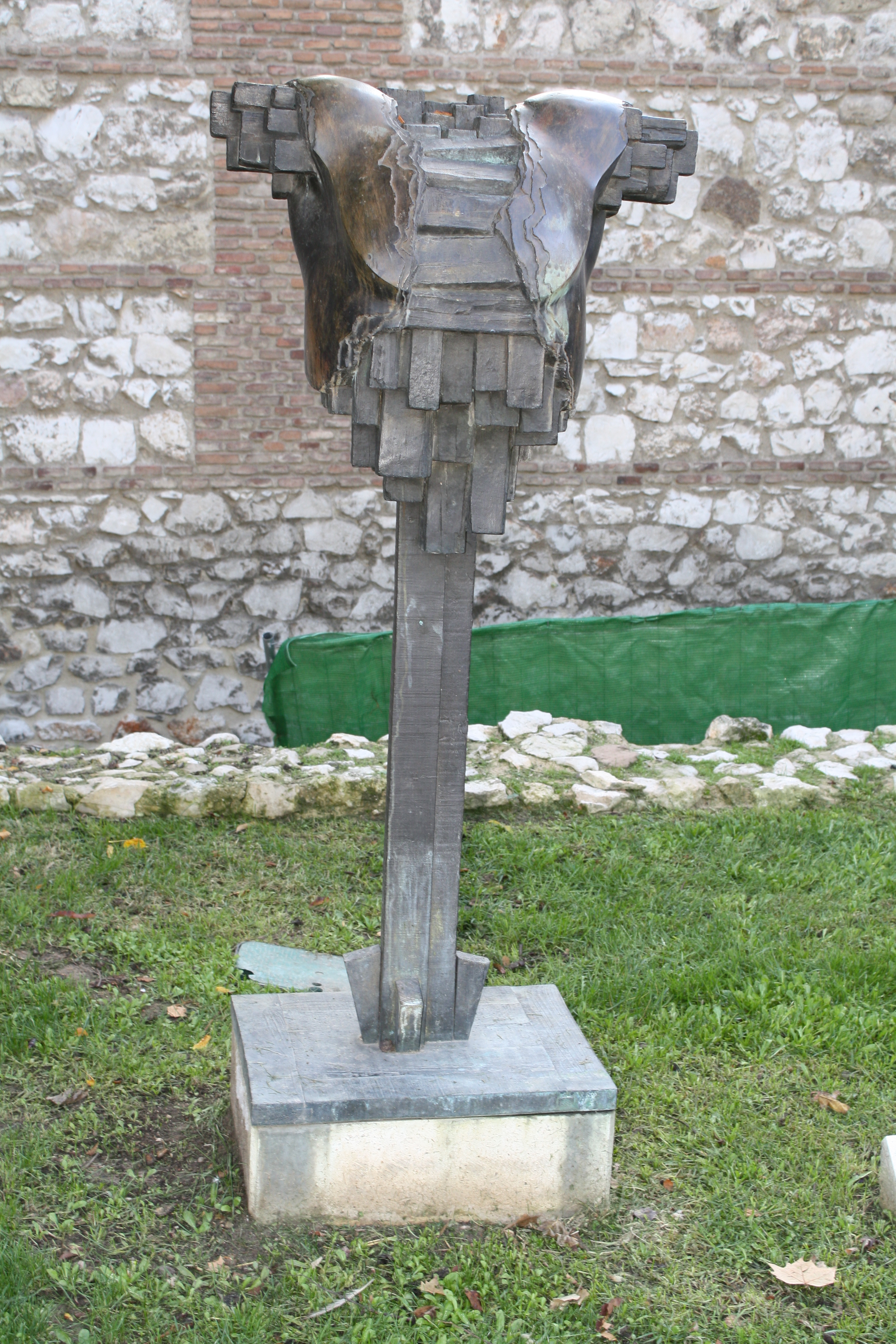
Carlos García Muela

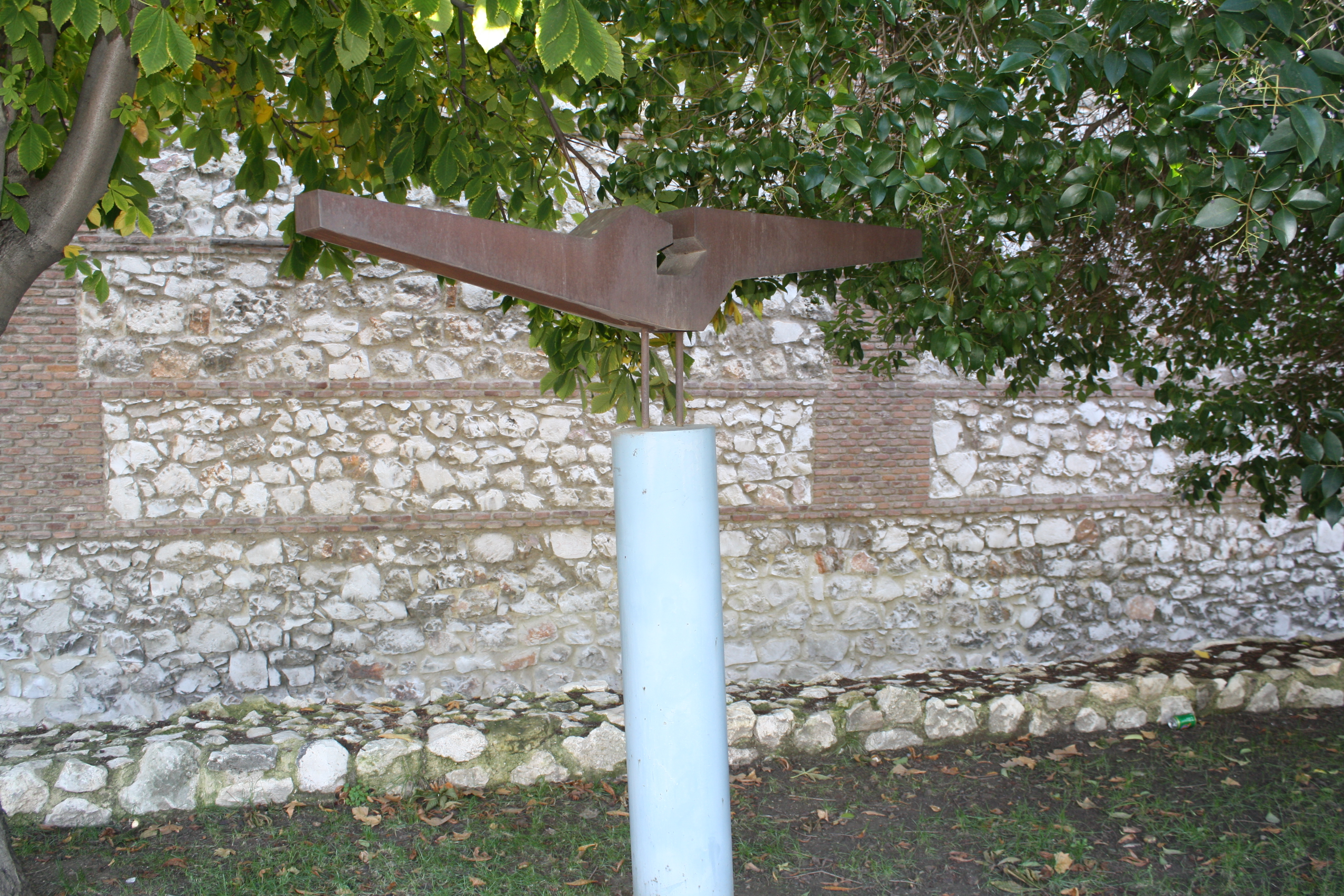
Ricardo Beleña

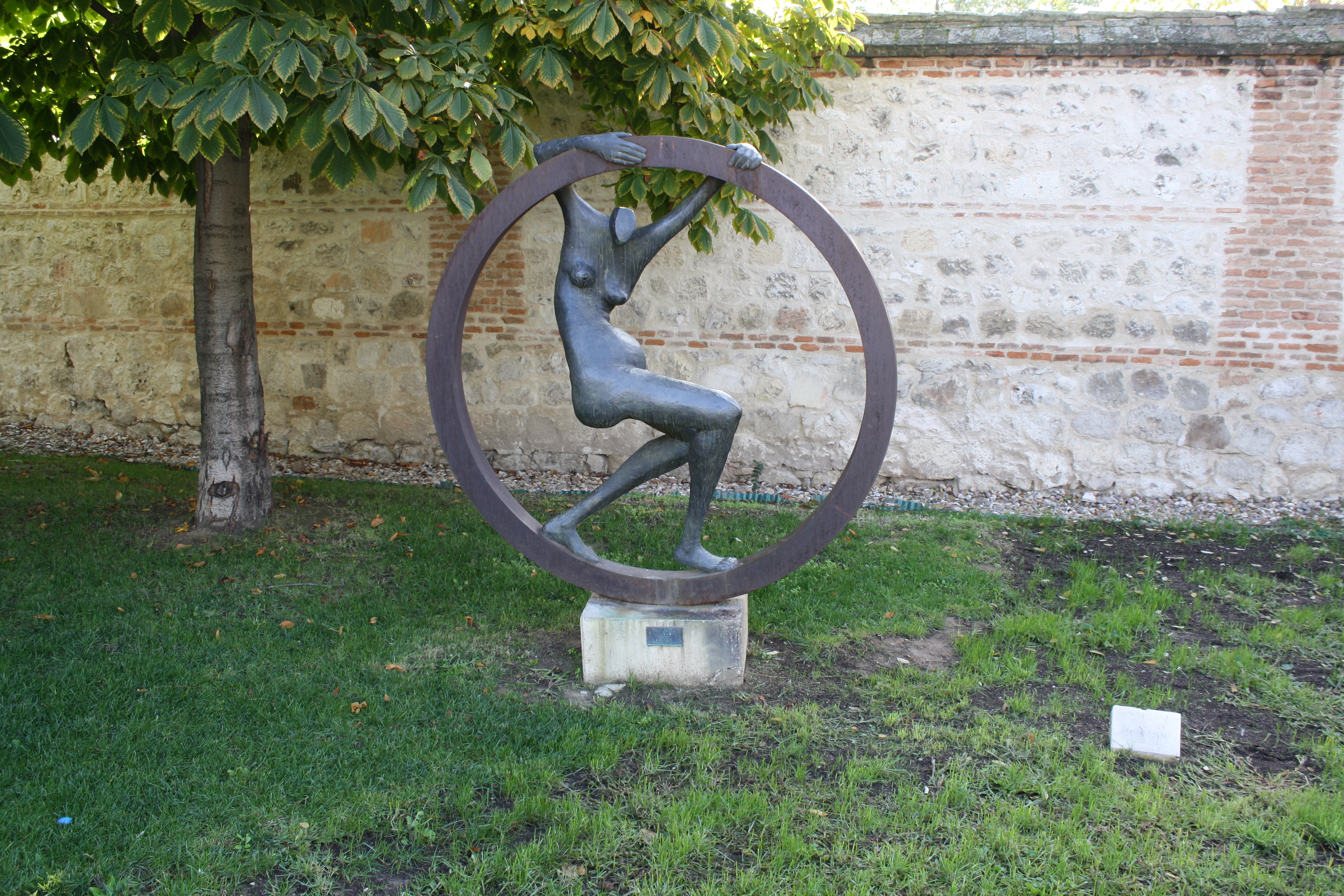
Carlos Prada

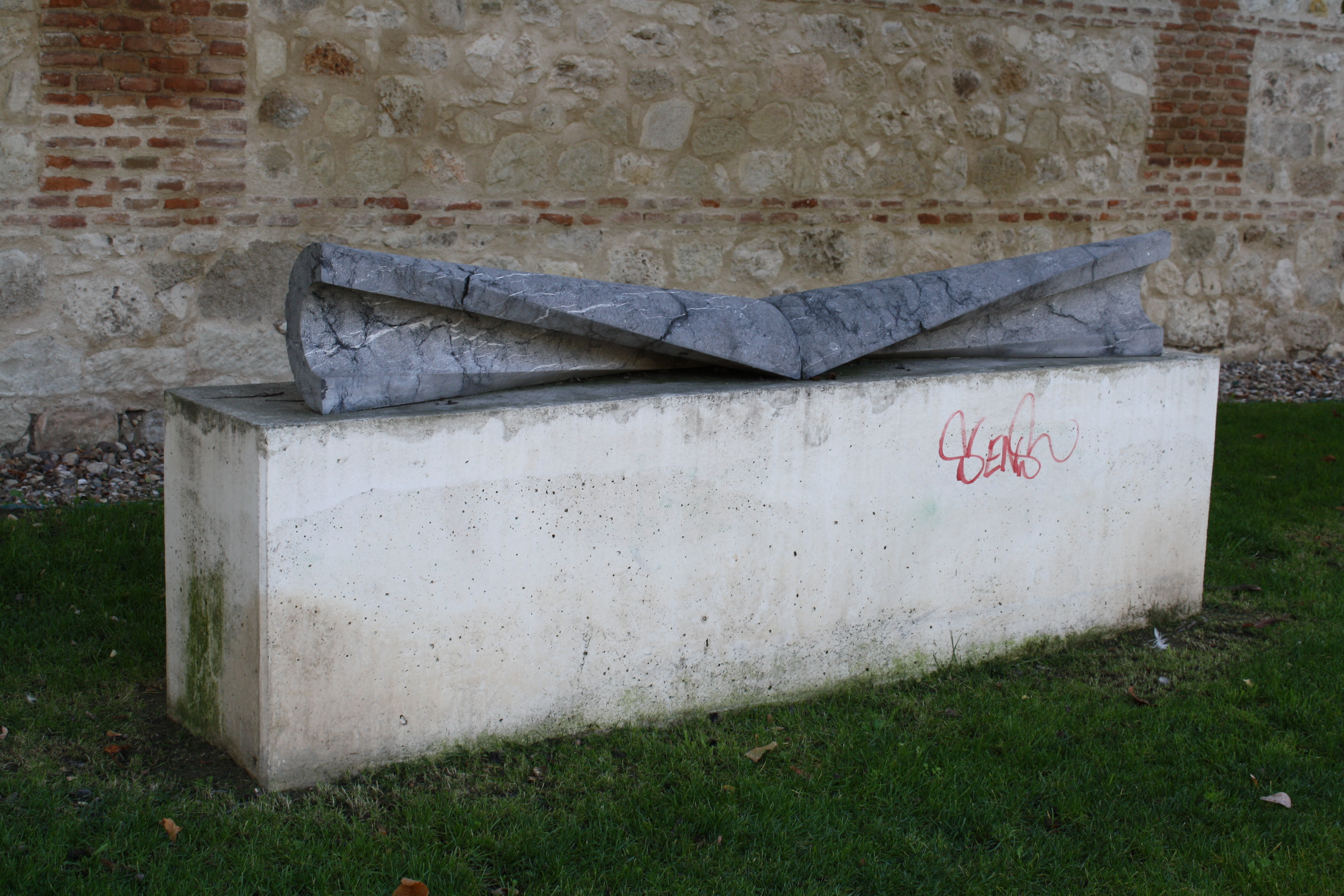
Xabier Laka

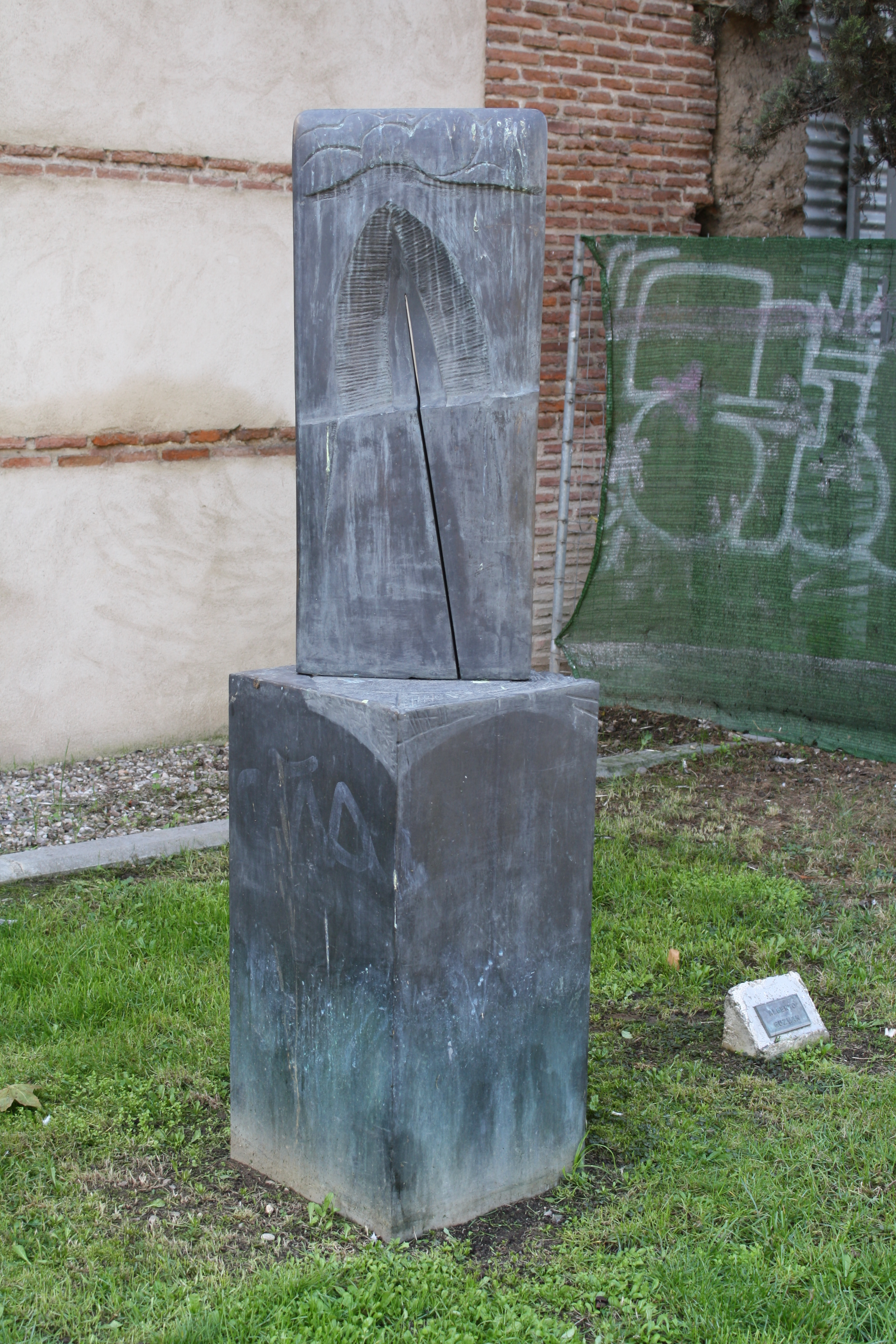
Alberto Guzmán

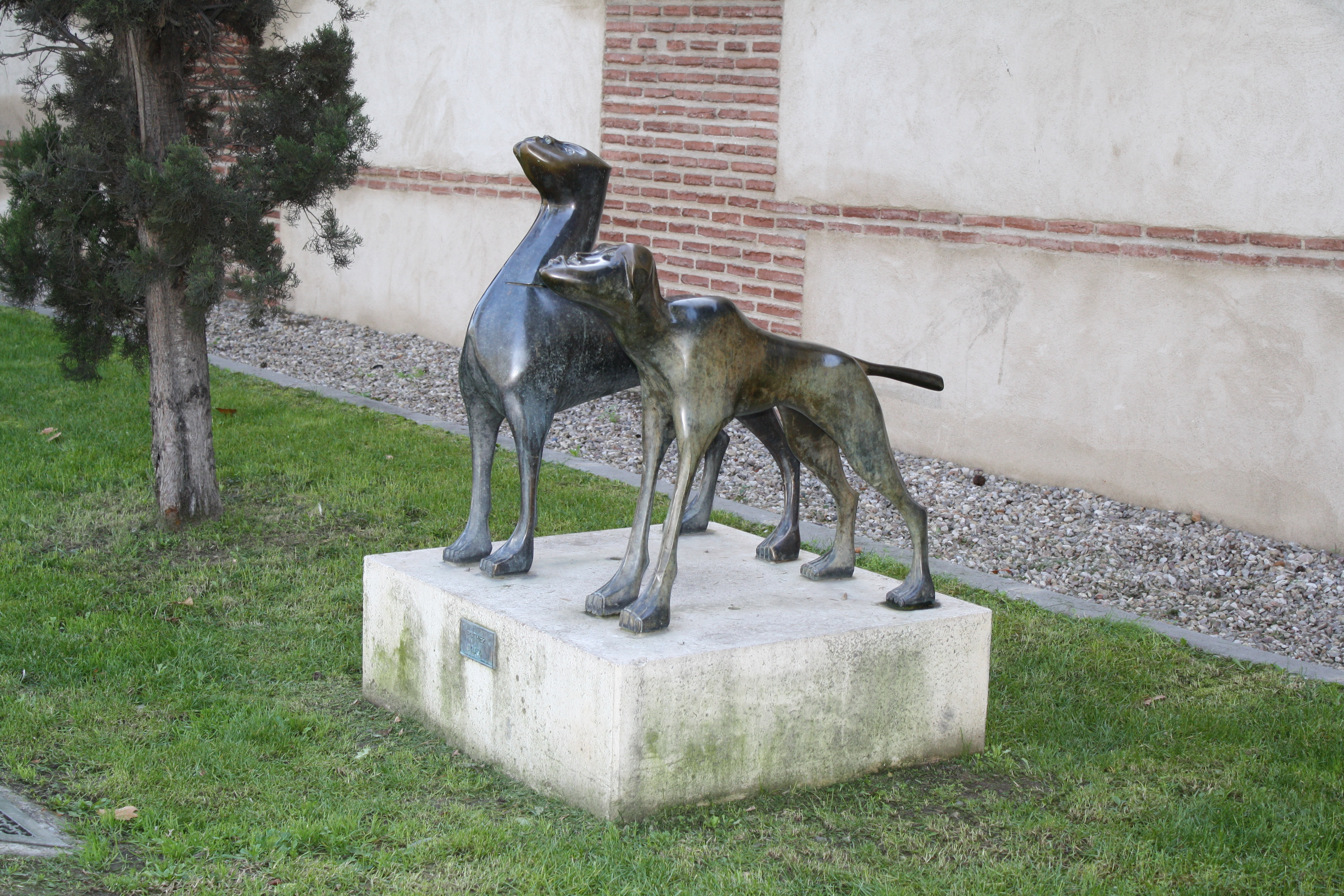
Gaudi Esté

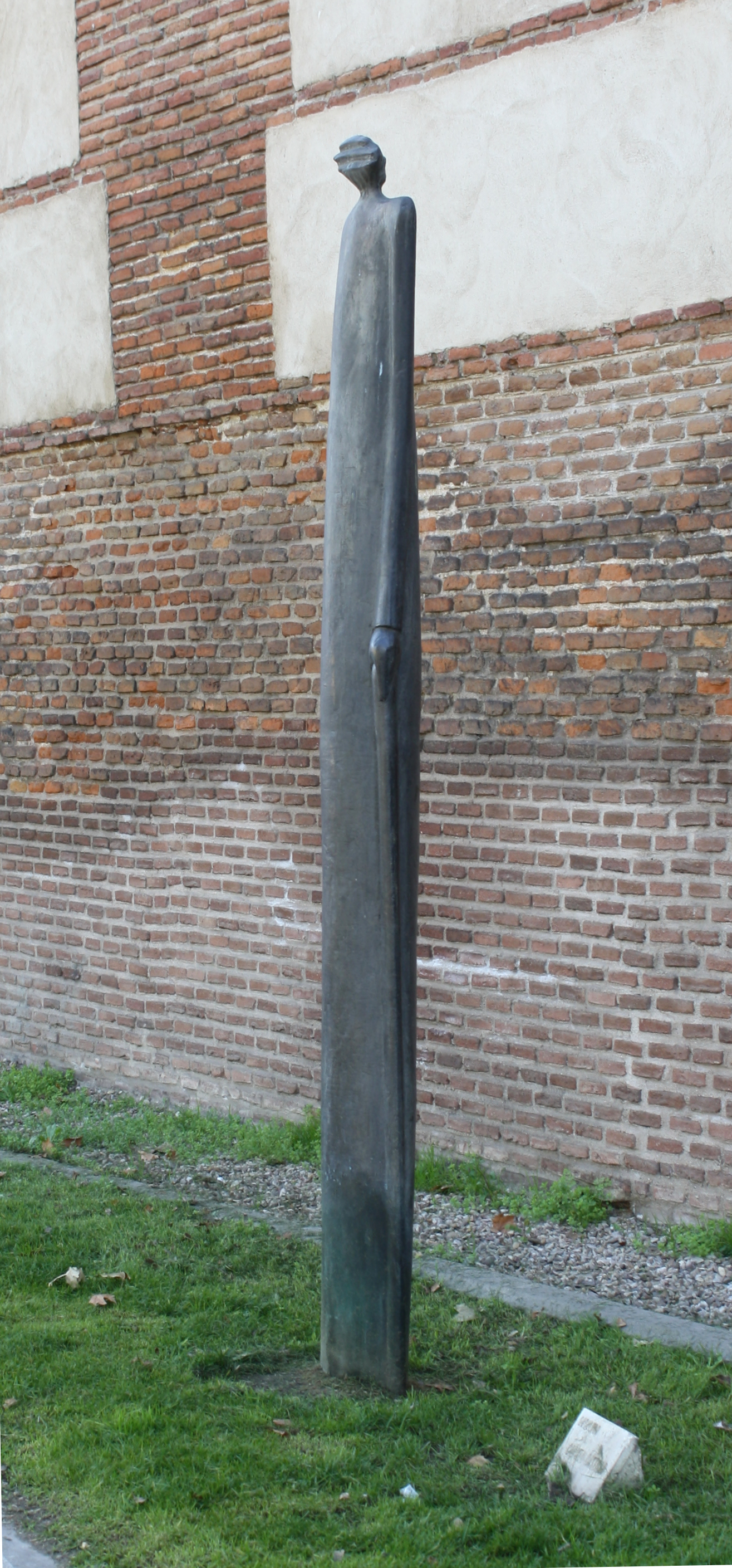
Carmen Castillo

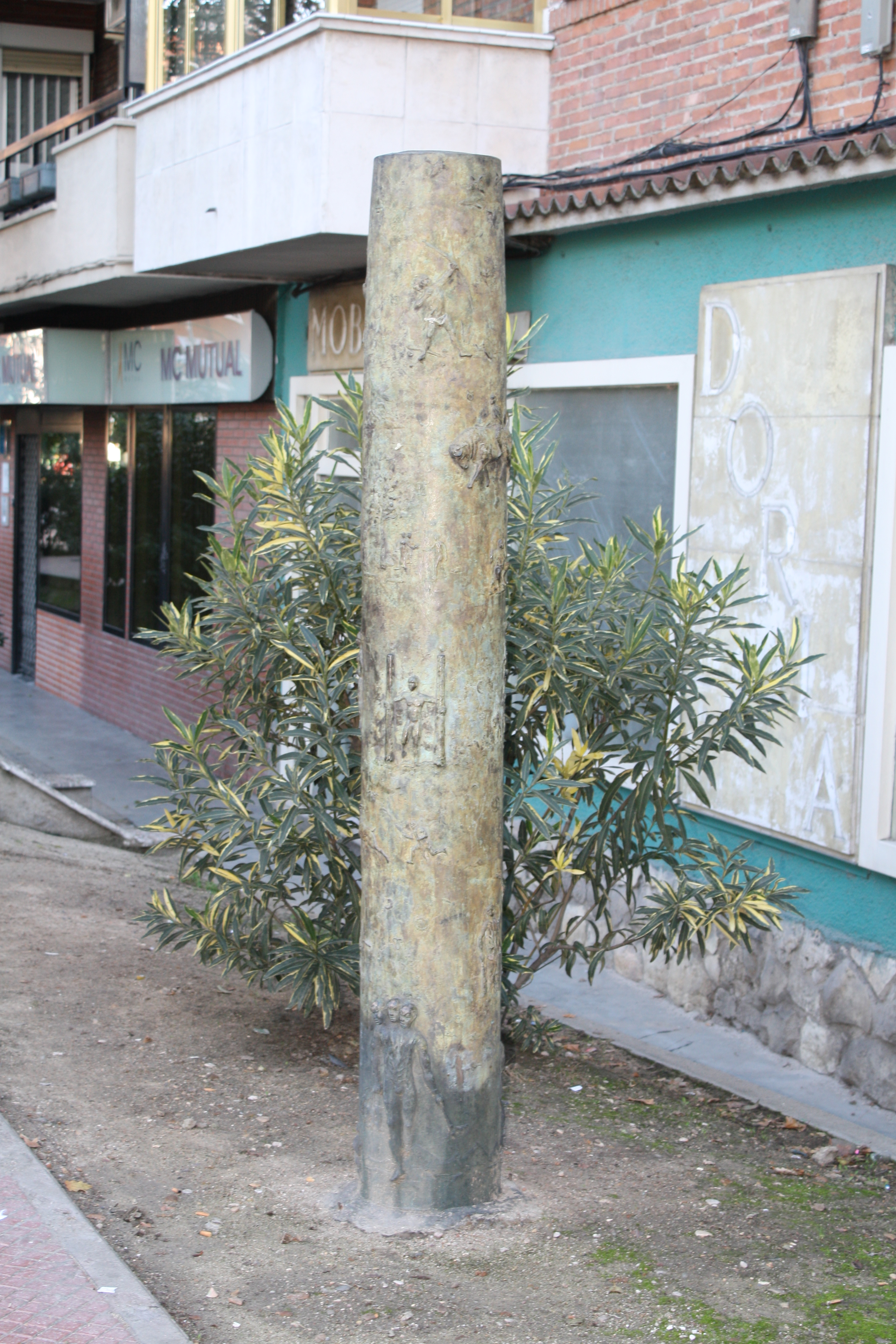
Cristóbal

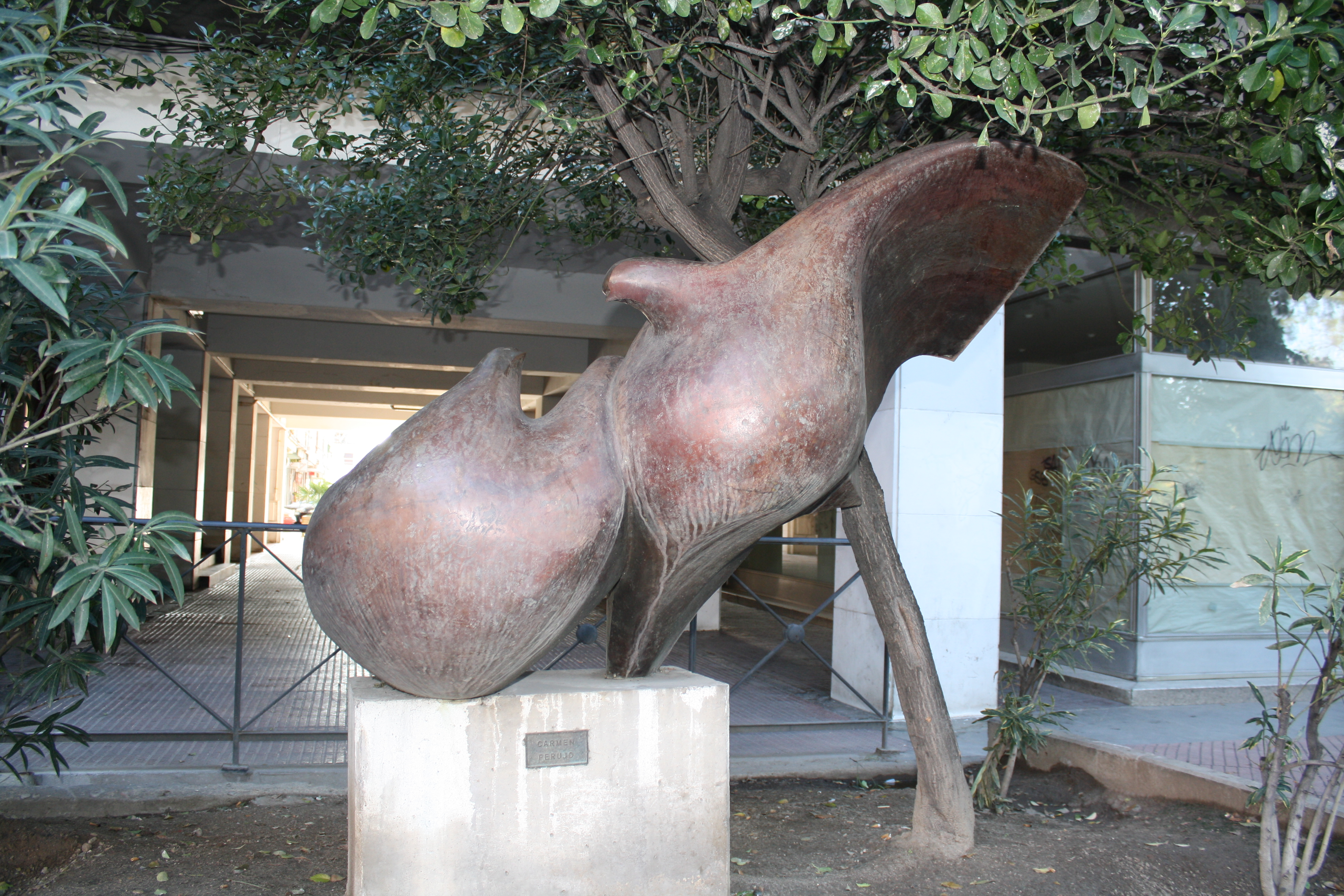
Carmen Perujo

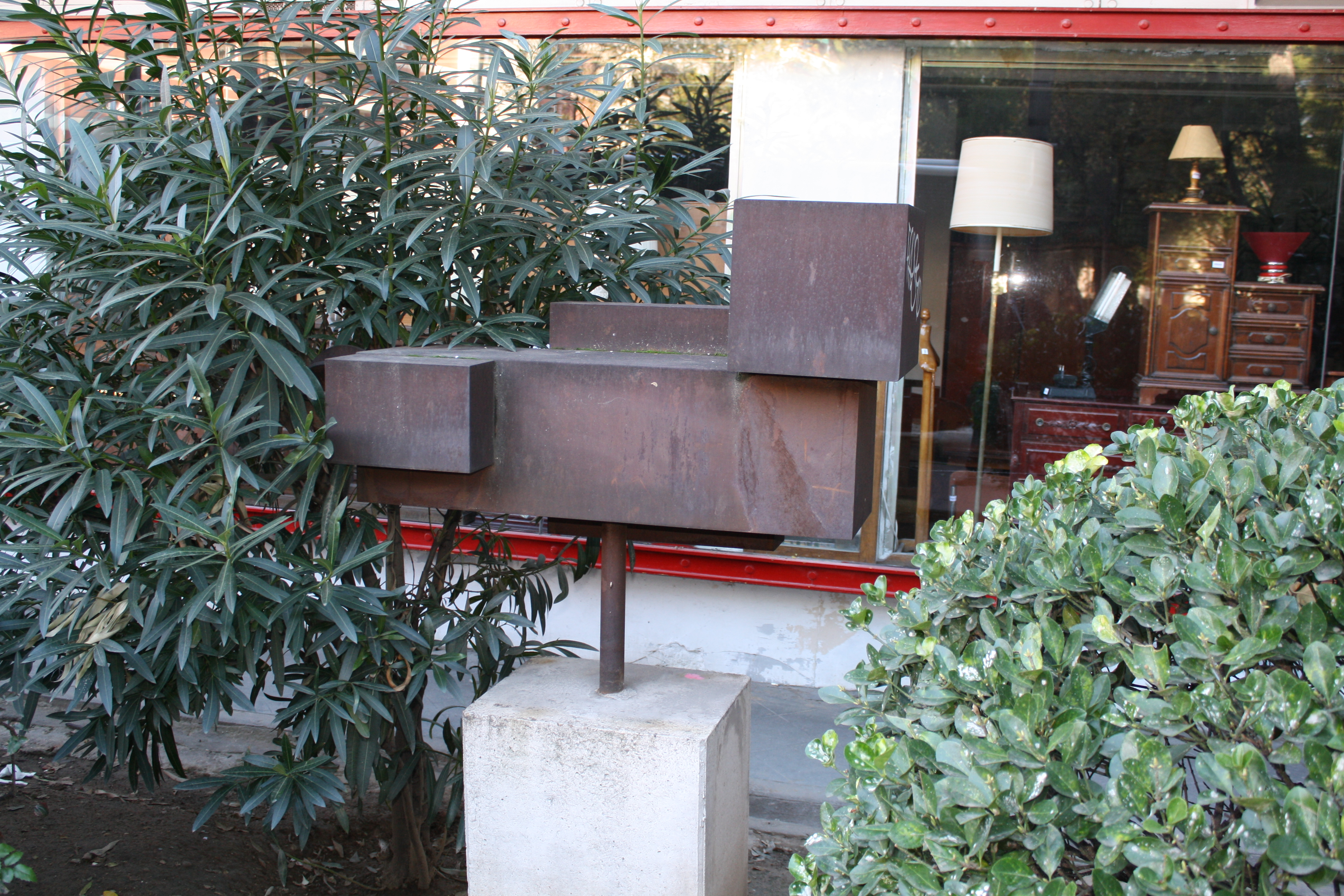
Nassio Bayarri

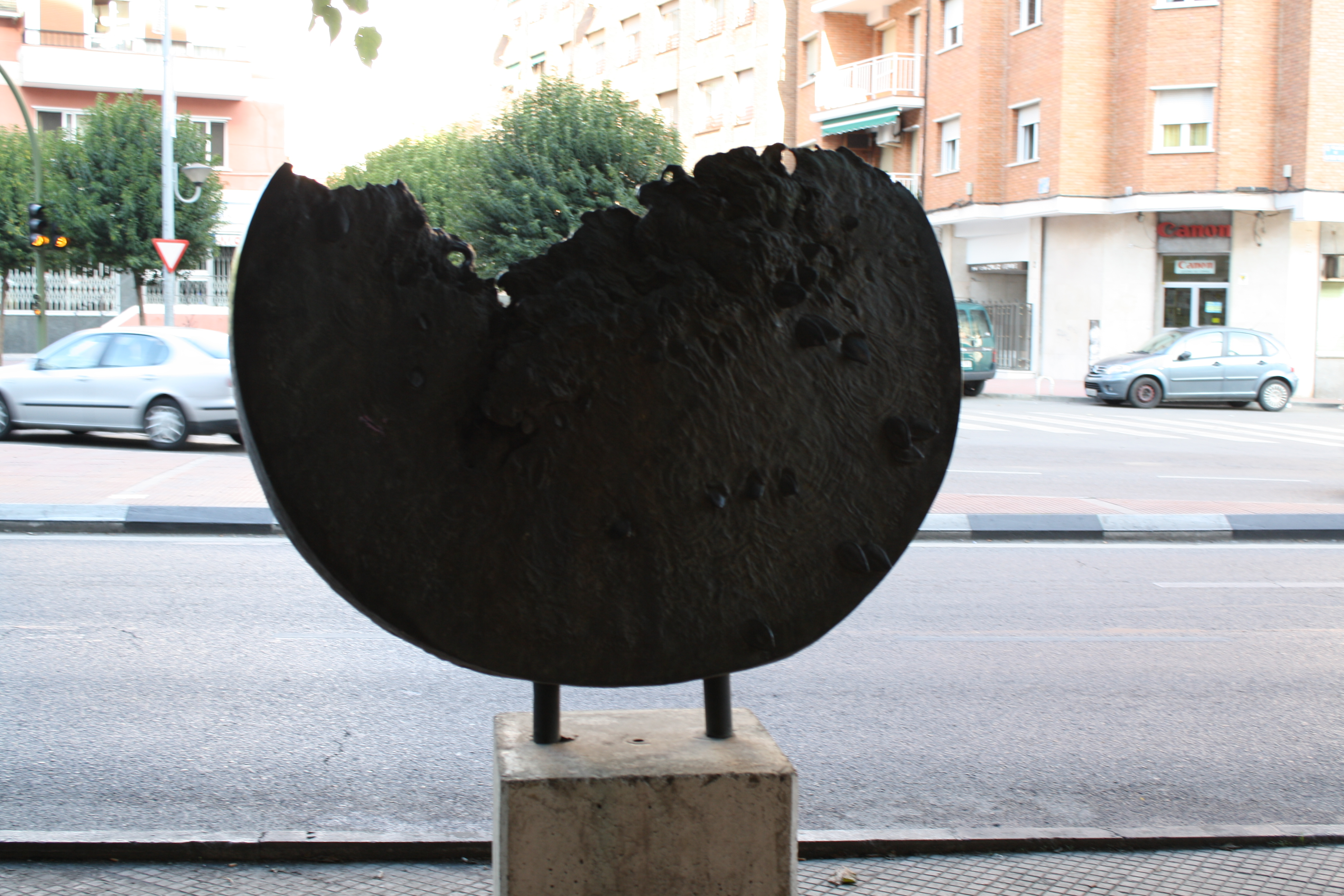
Rafael Muyor

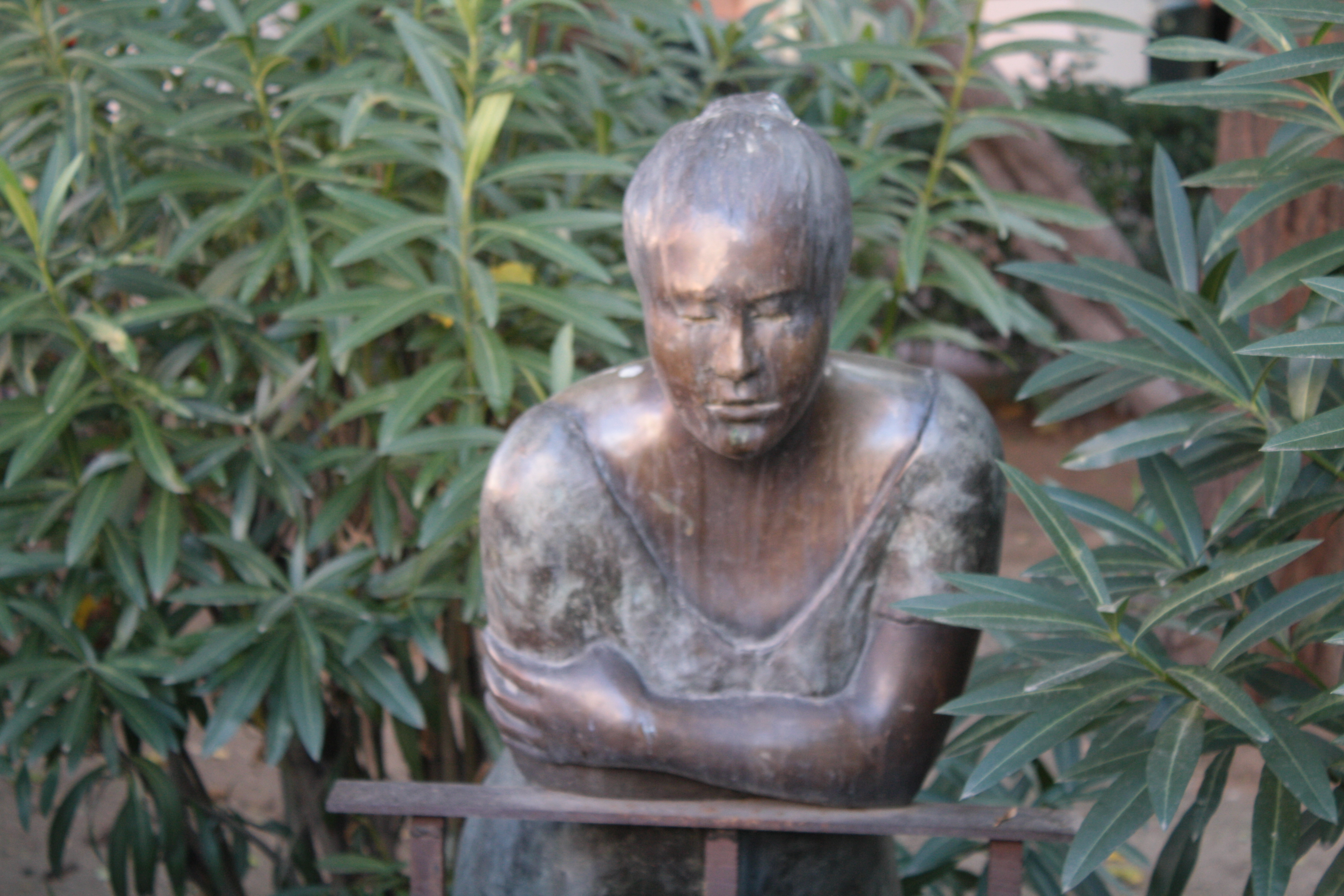
Beatiz Kohn

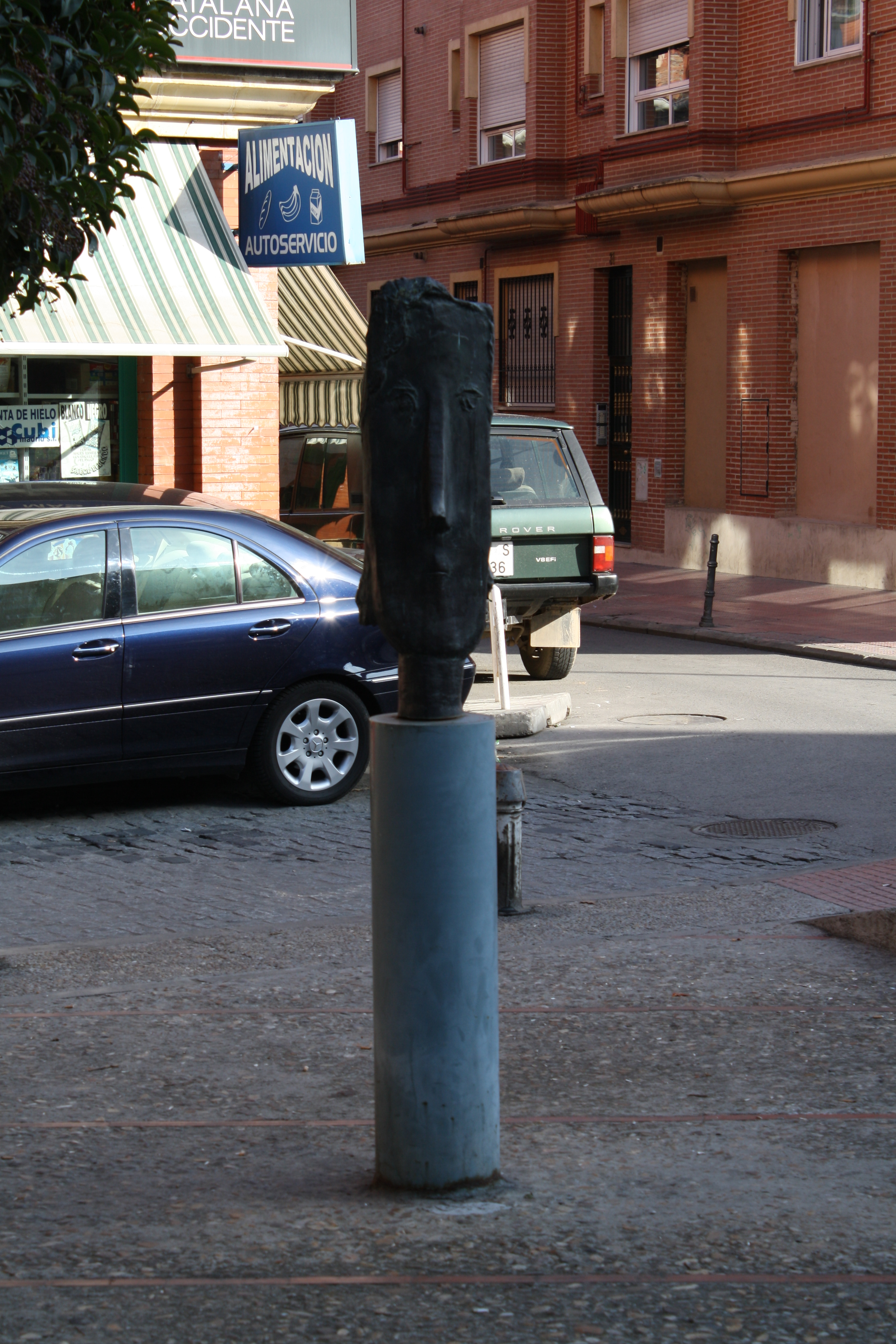
Encarnación Hernández

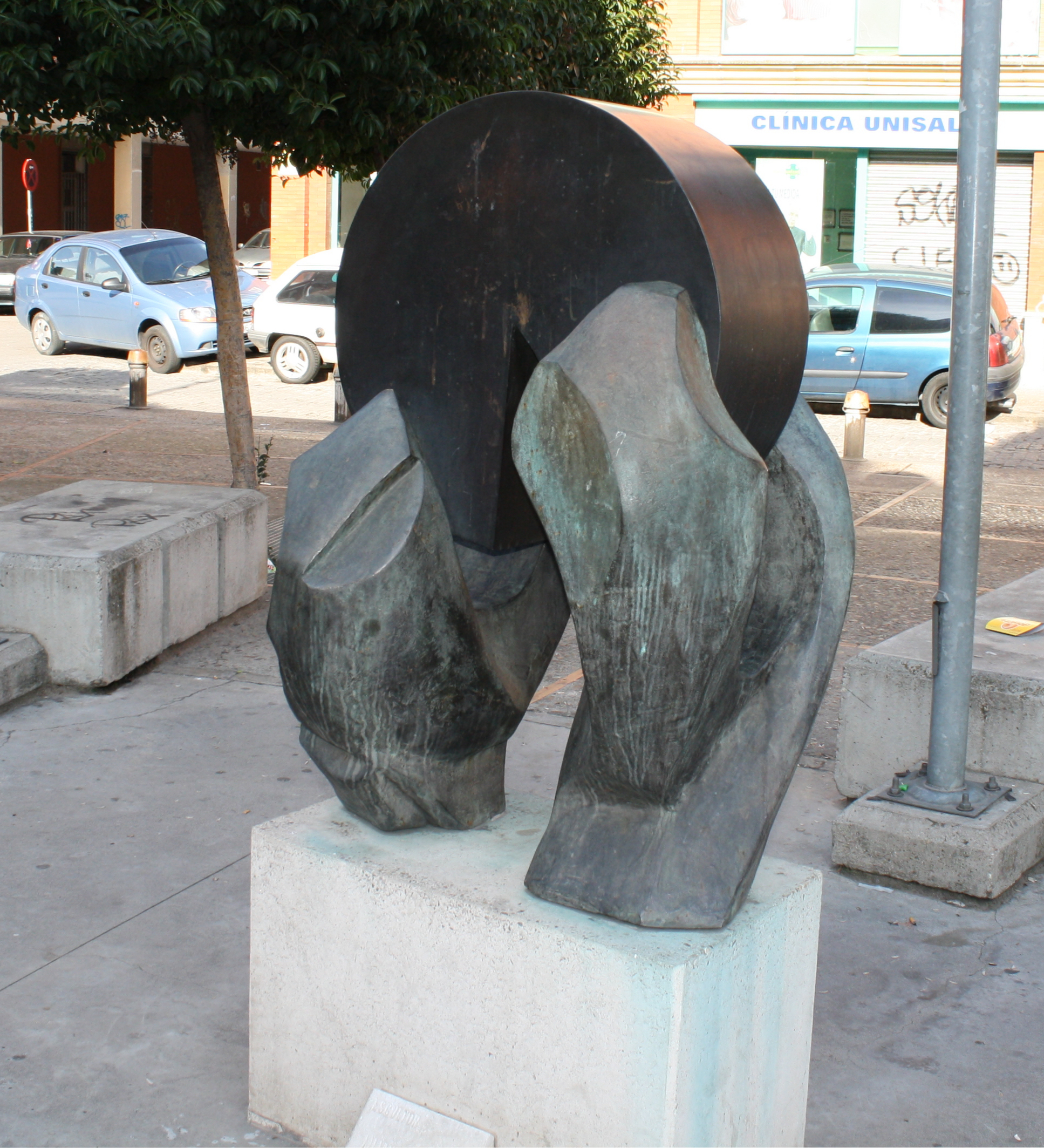
Lilianne Katsuki

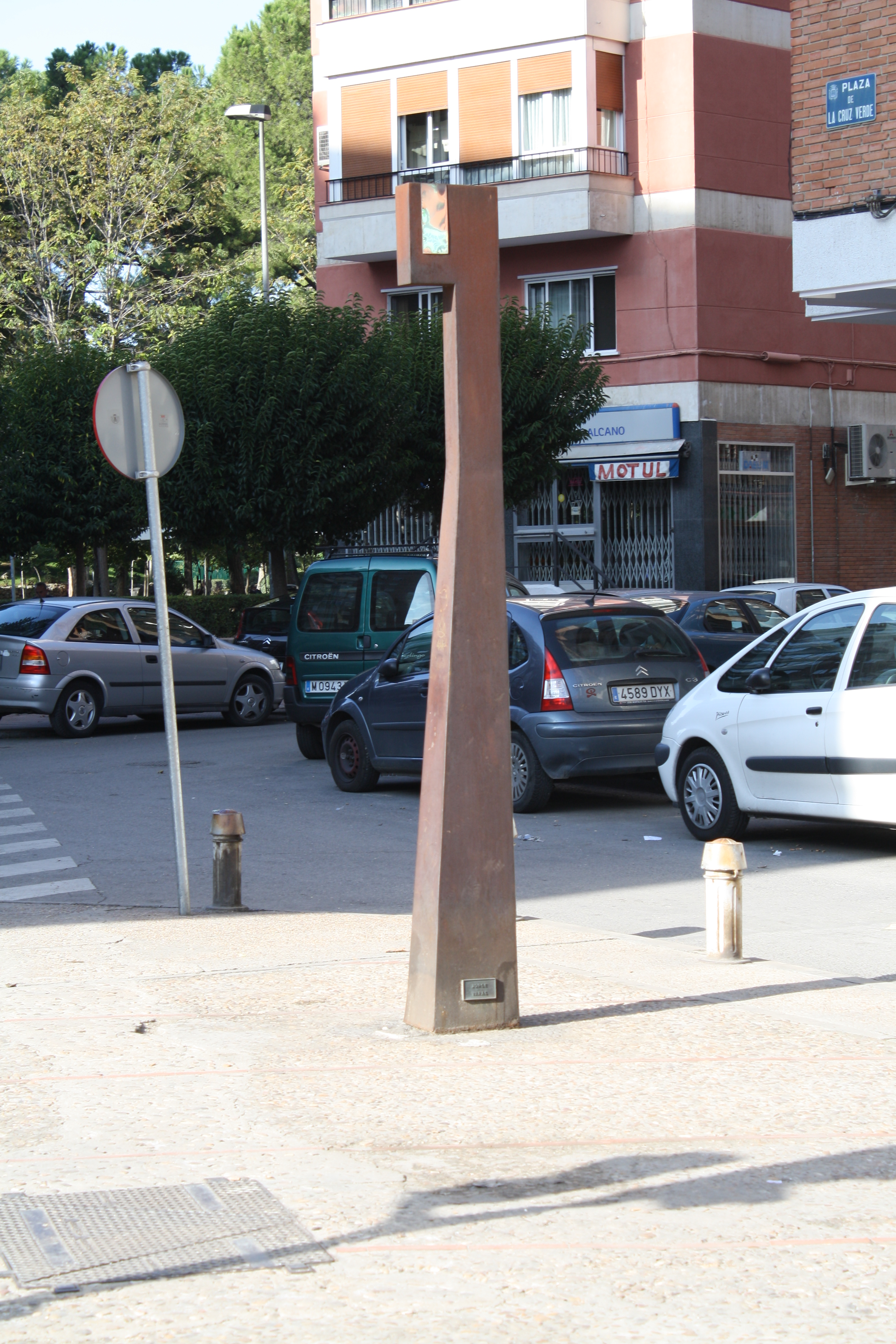
Jorge Varas

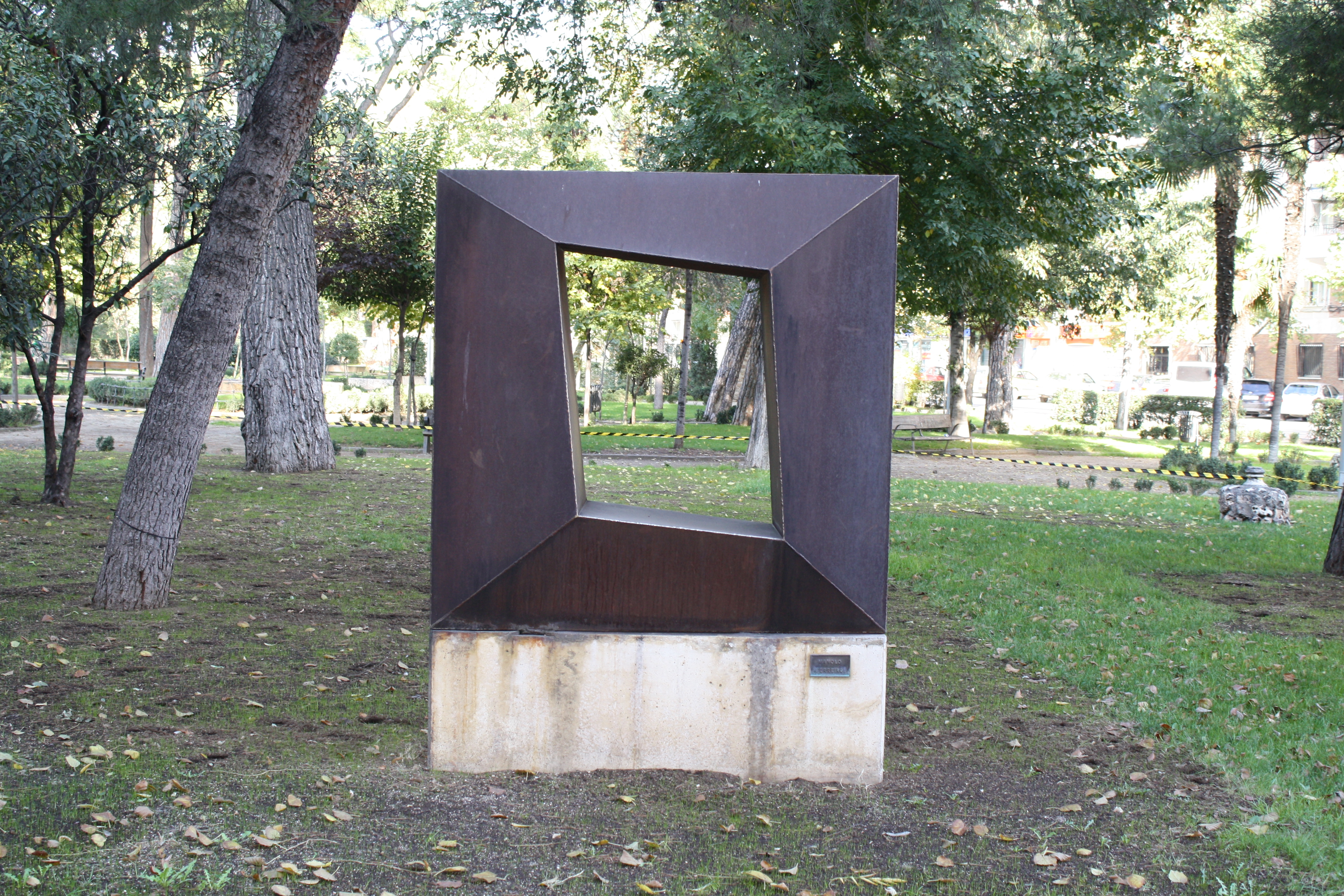
Ferreiro Badía

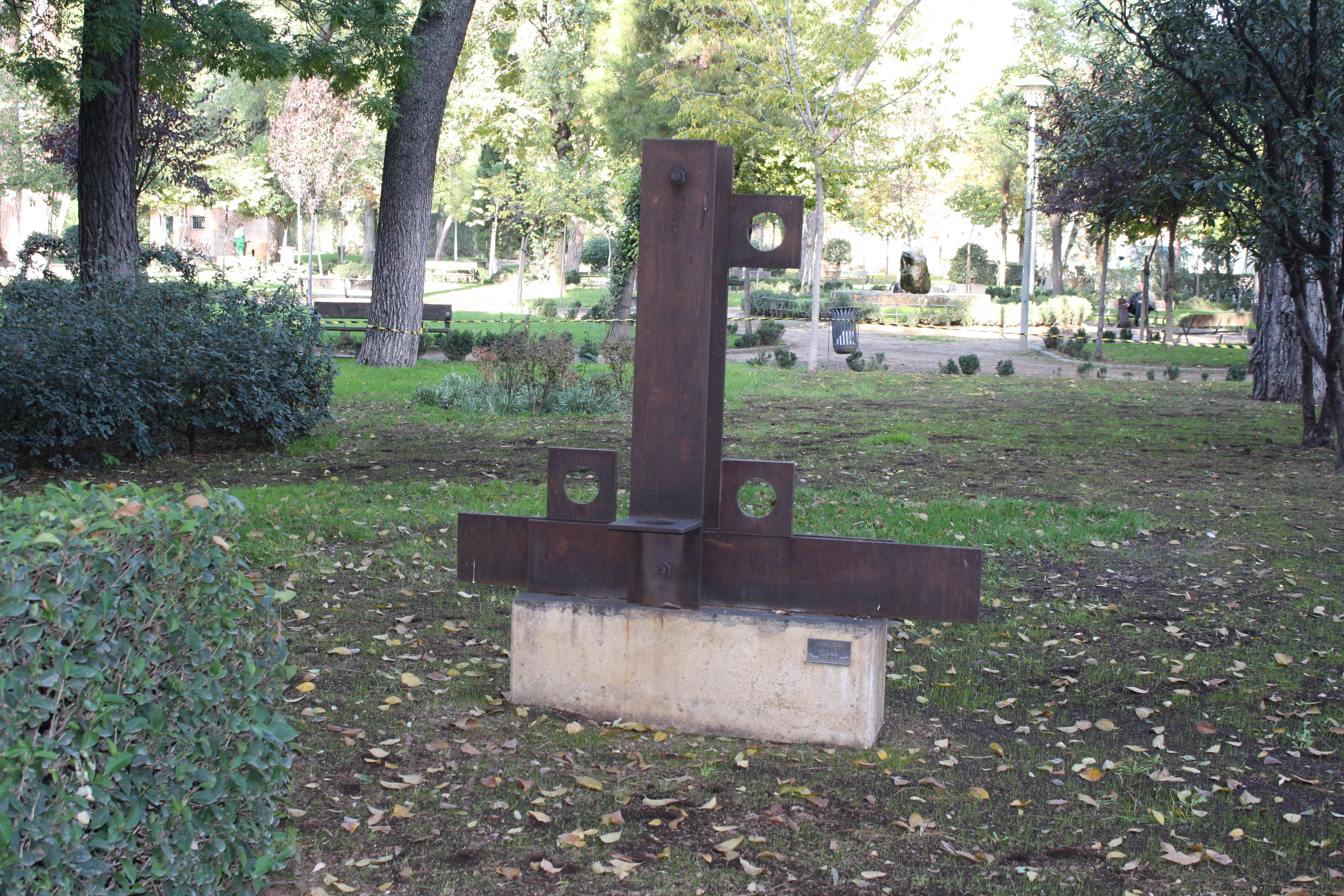
Ernesto Knörr

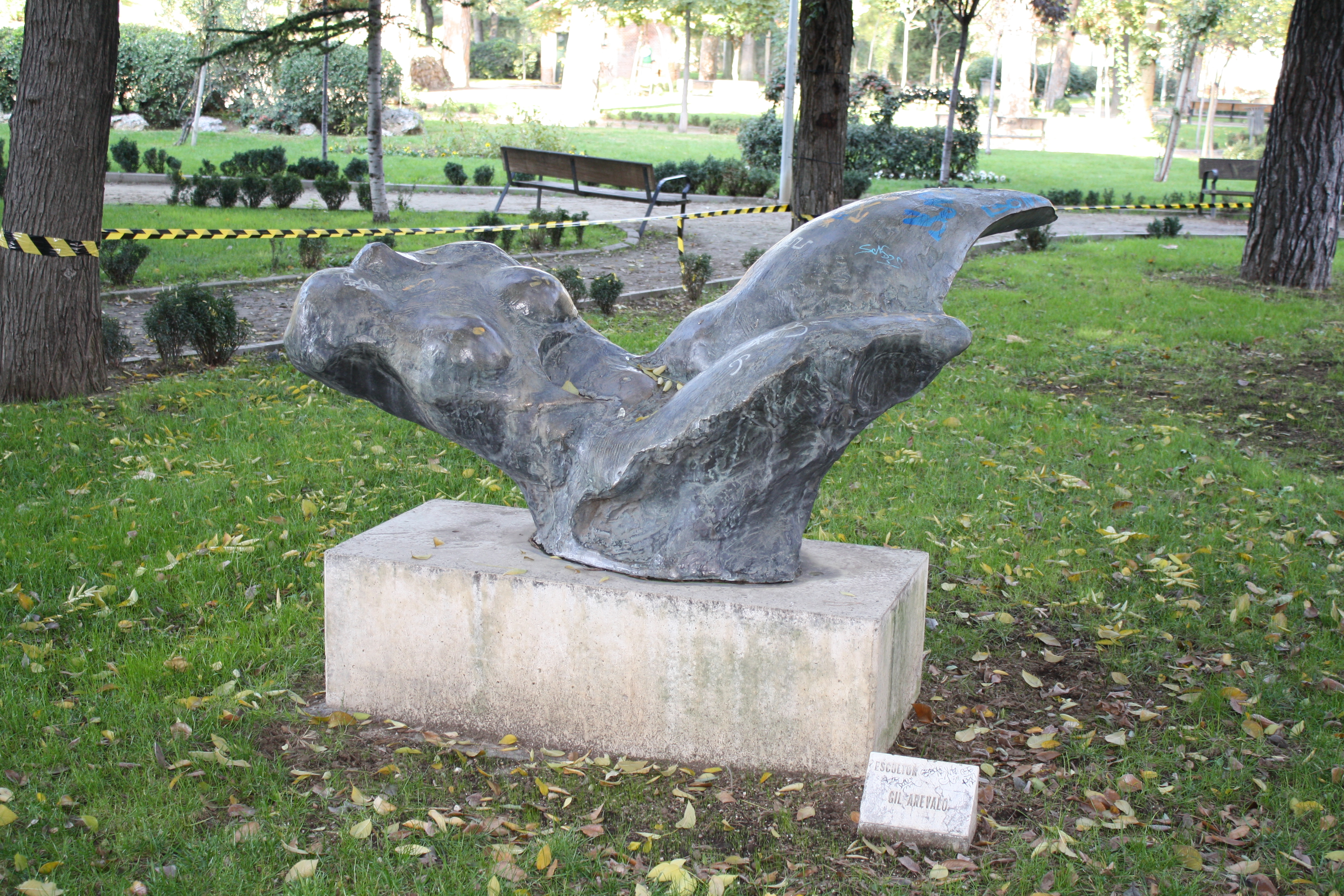
Gil Arévalo

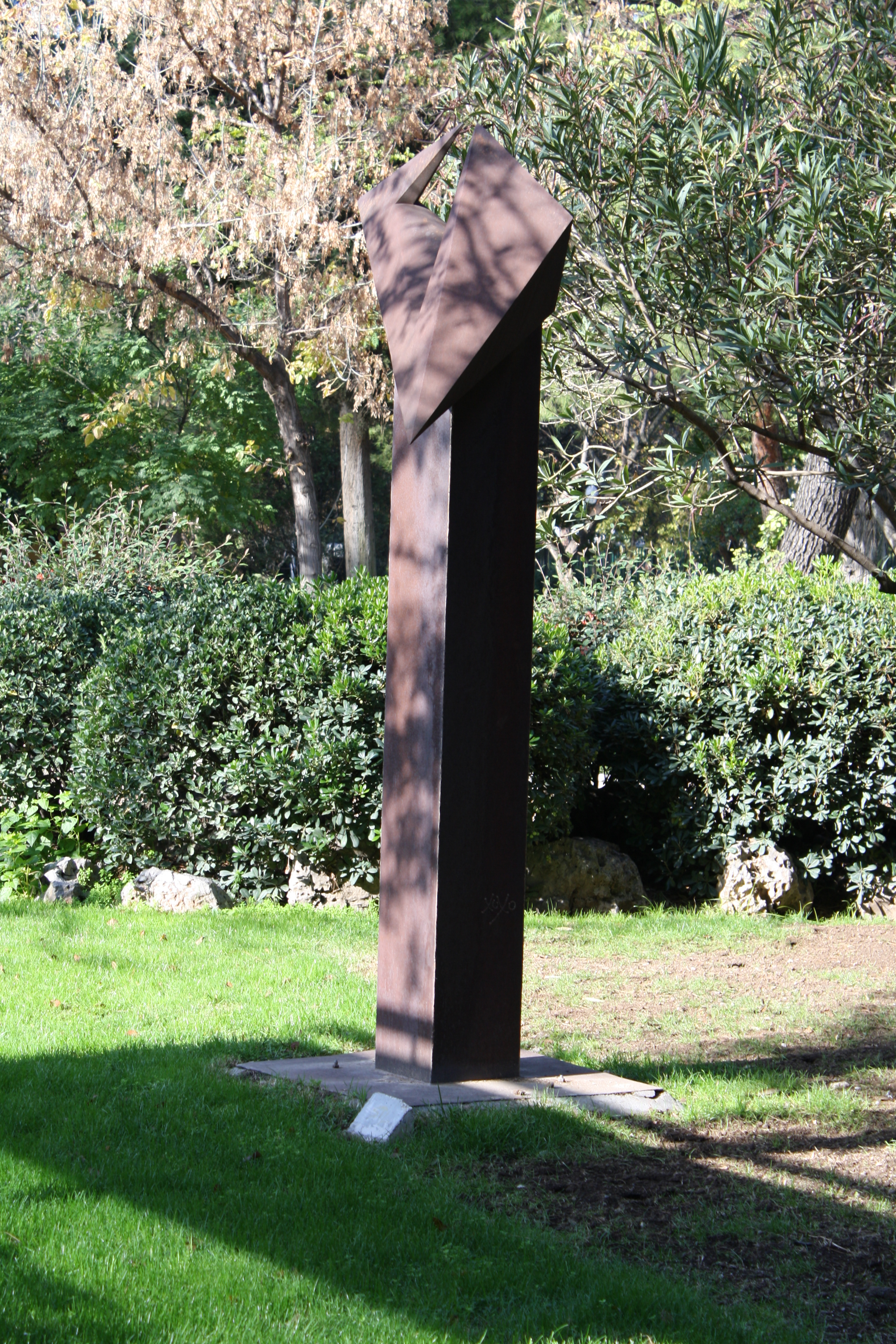
Xuxo Vázquez

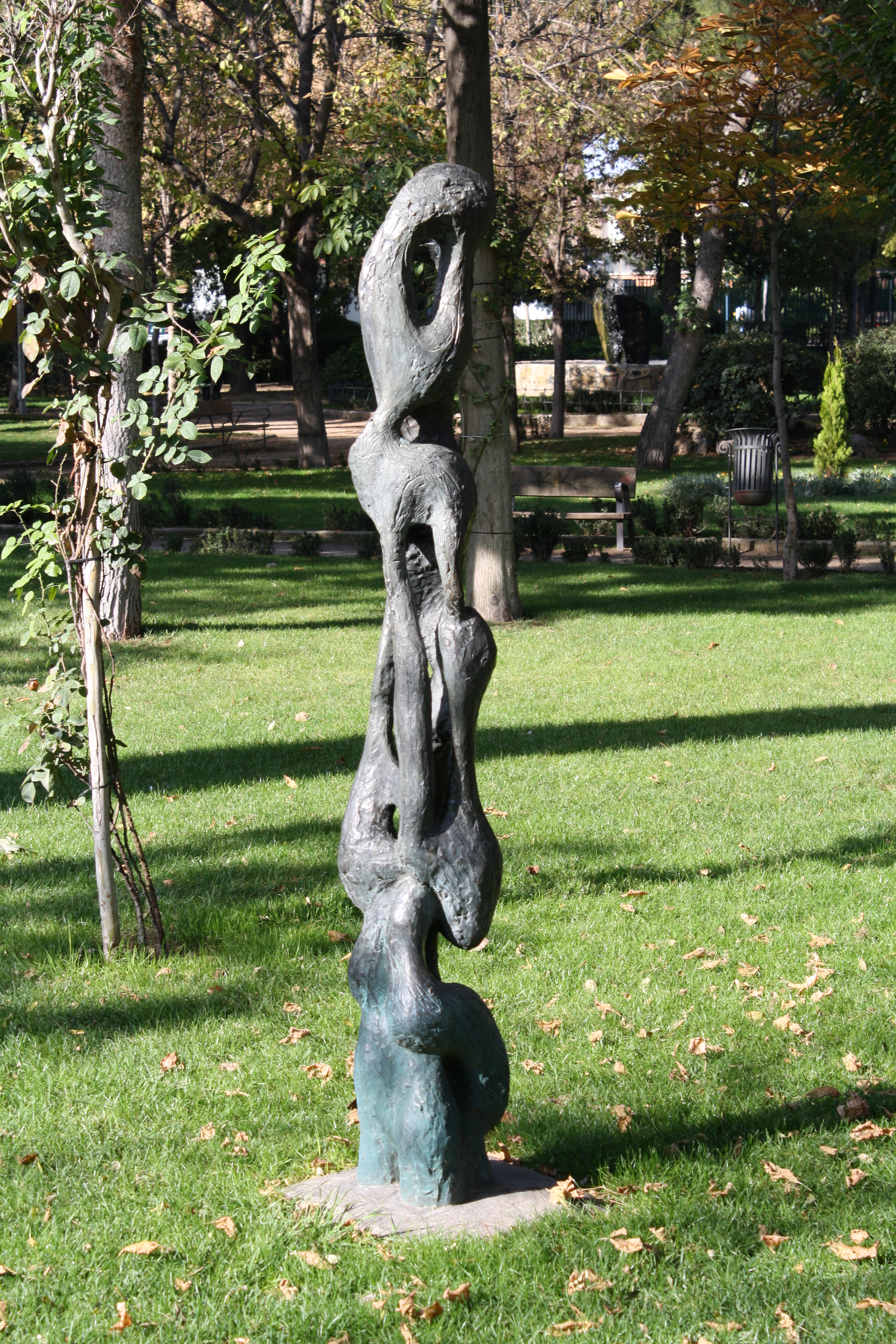
Berrutti

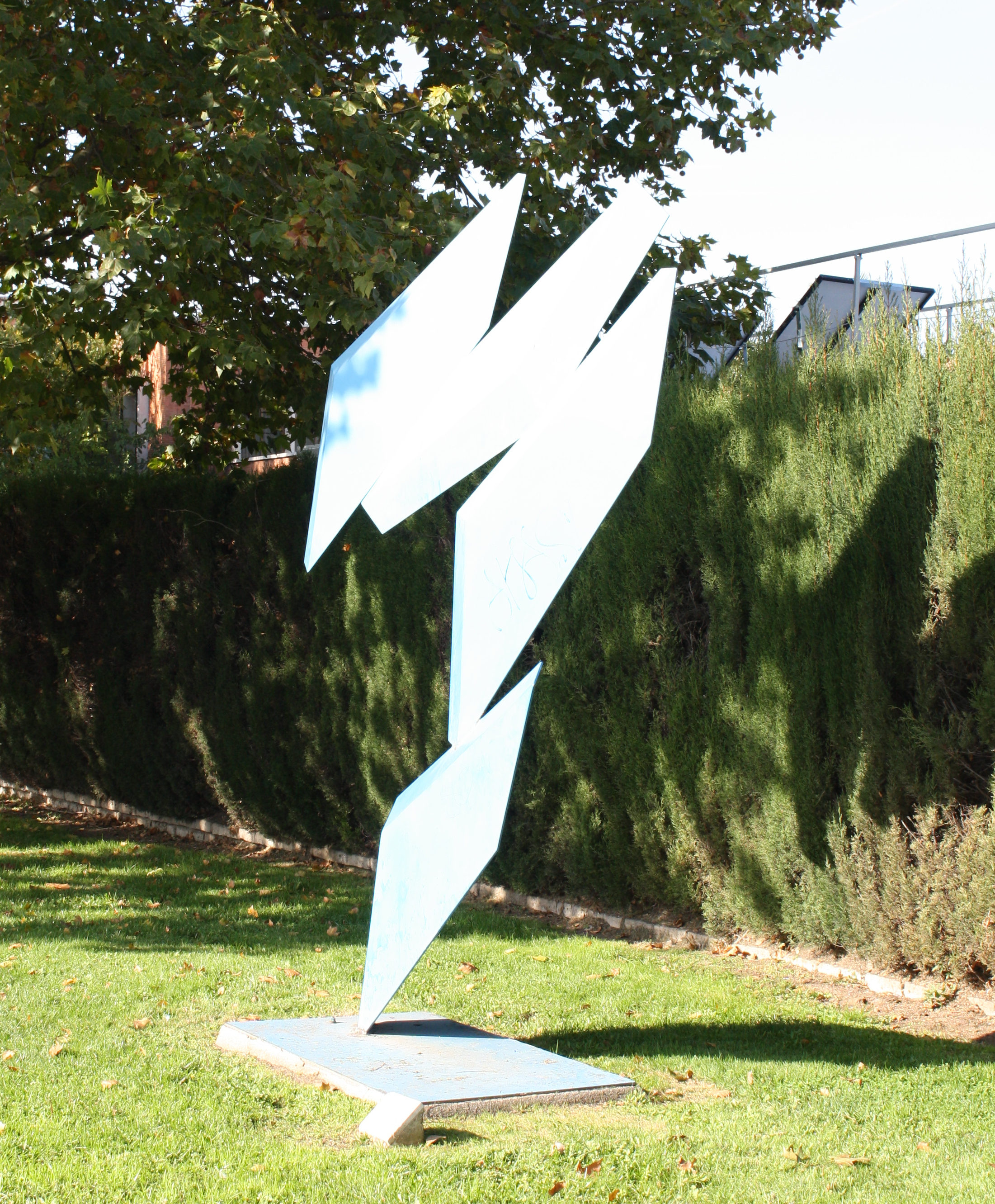
Rafael Barrios

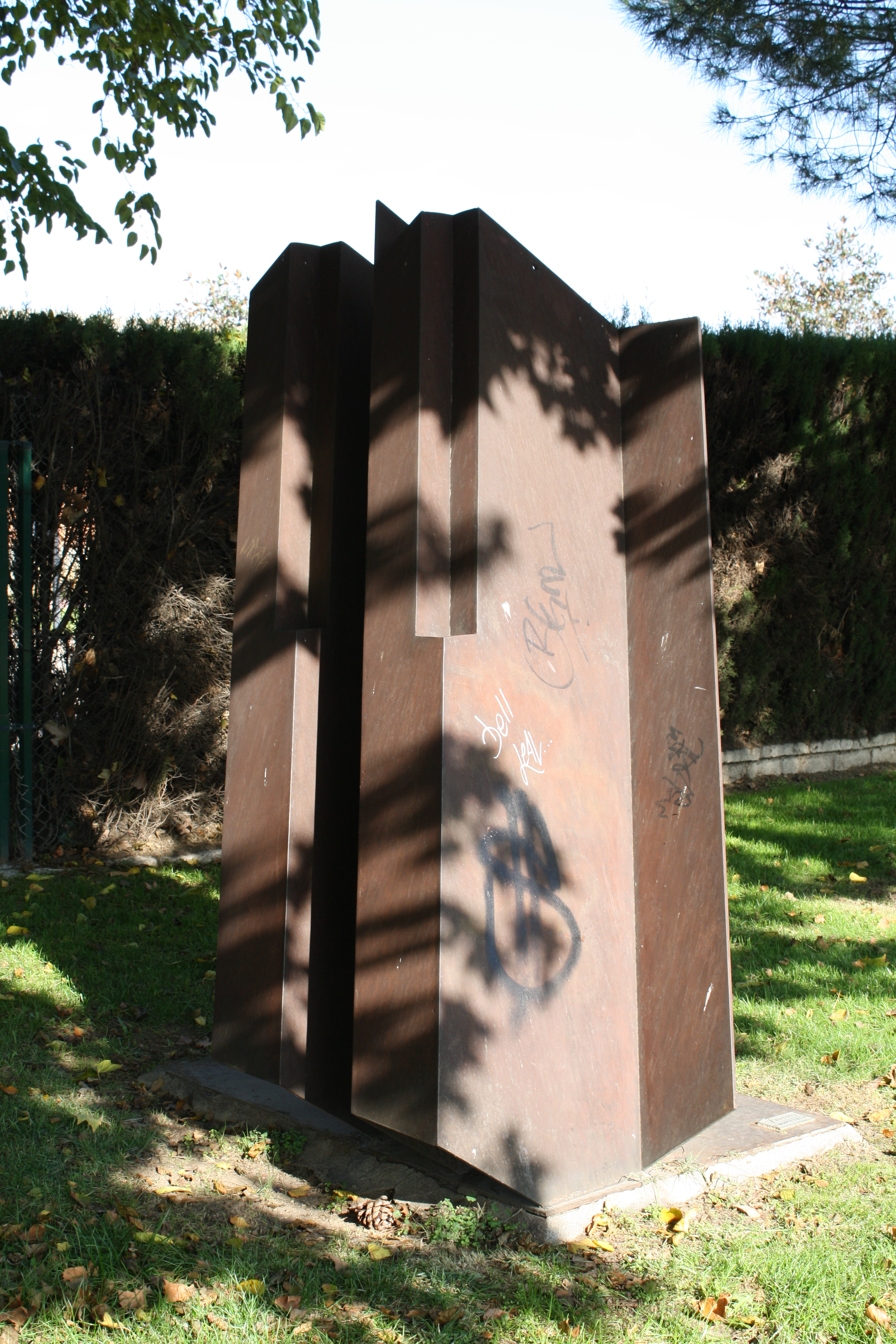
Carlos Evangelista

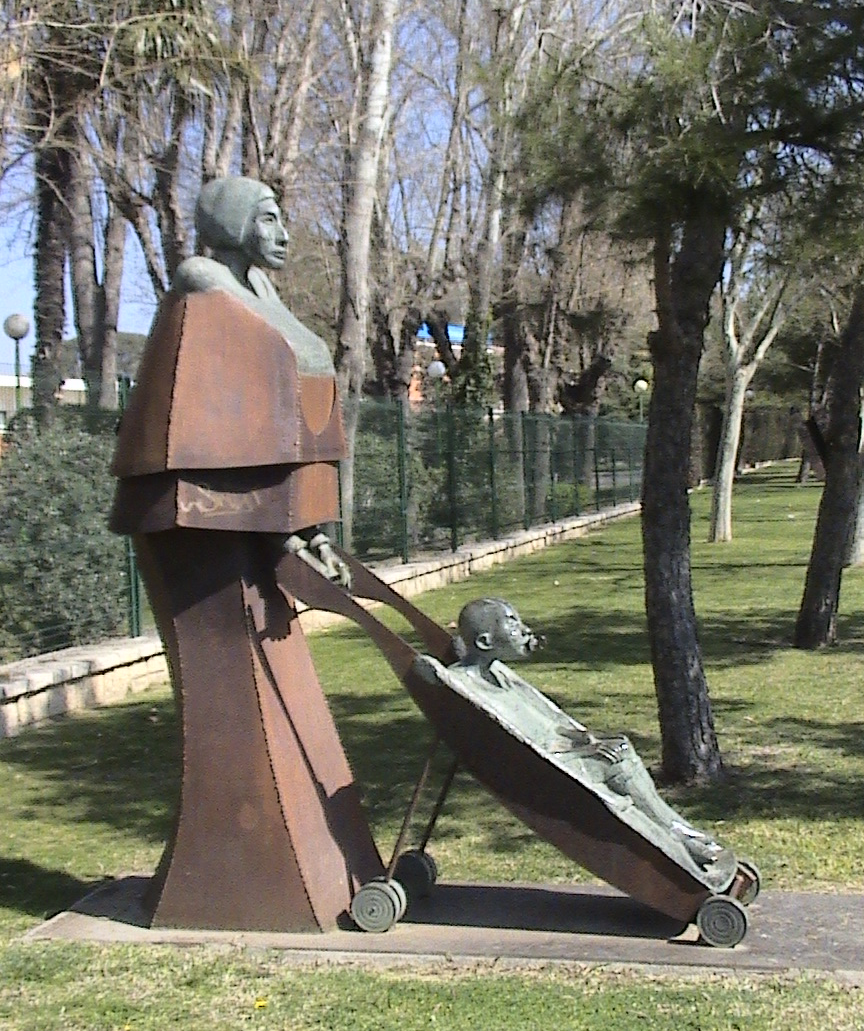
Jorge Seguí

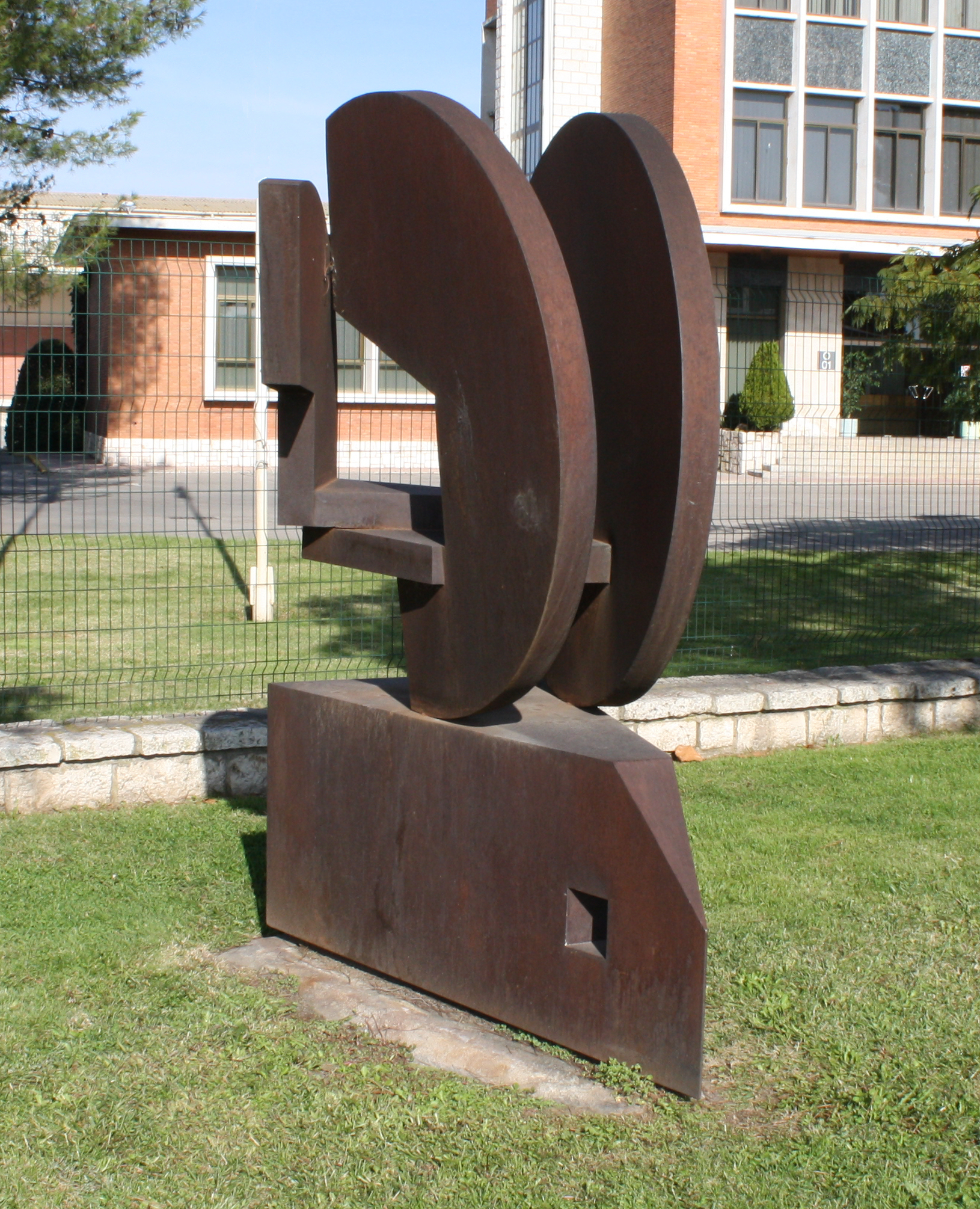
Aizkorbe

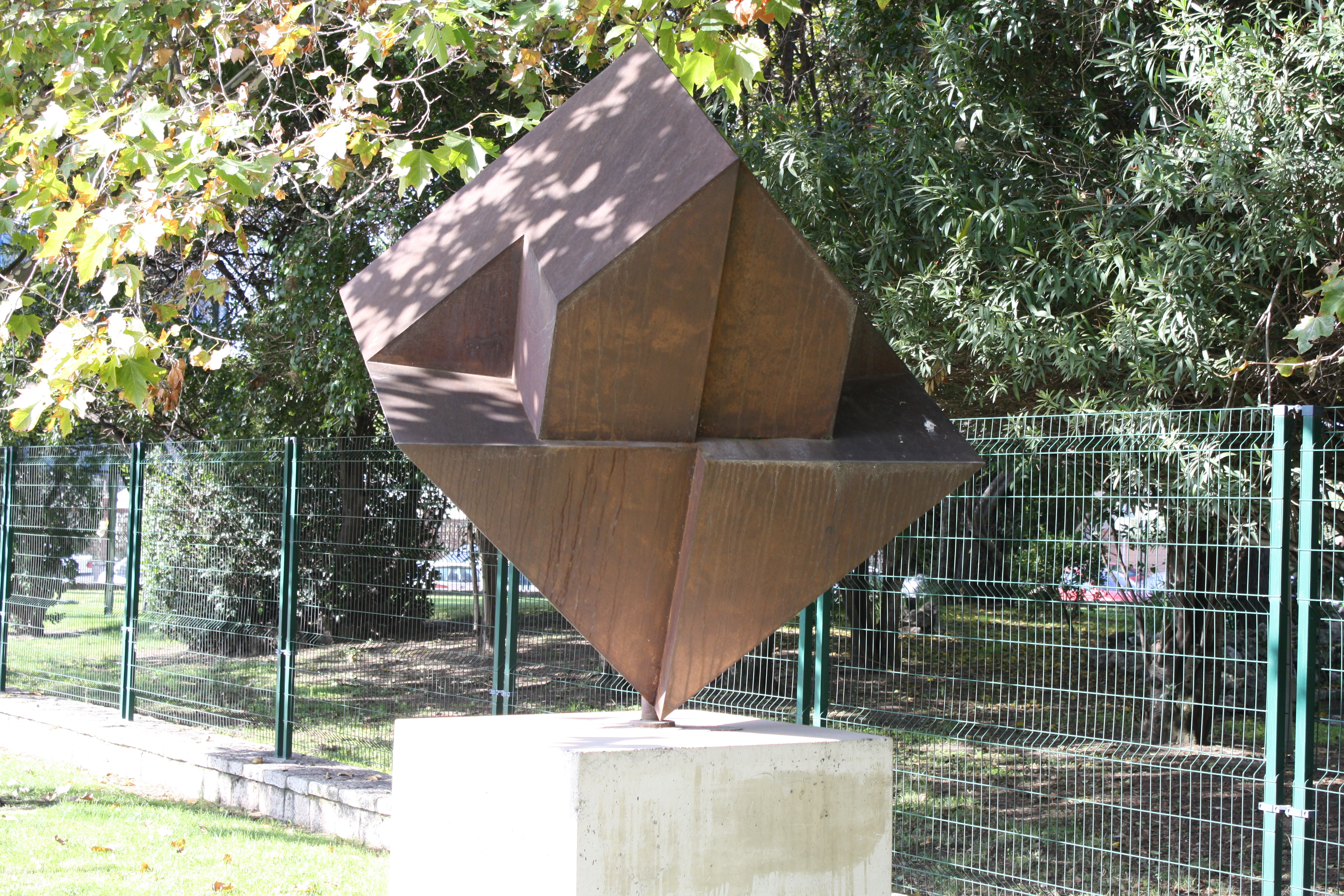
Luis Caruncho

== See also ==
- List of contemporary art museums
- Museo Nacional Centro de Arte Reina Sofía de Madrid
- National Museum of Sculpture, Valladolid
- Open-air museum
