= List of Spanish artists =

This is a list of notable Spanish artists born after 1800.

For artists born before this year, see List of Spanish artists (born 1300–1500) and List of Spanish artists (born 1500–1800)

== Born 1801–1850 ==
- Bernardo López Piquer (1801–1874) painter
- Luis López Piquer (1802–1865) painter
- Antonio Maria Esquivel (1806-1857) painter
- José María Avrial (1807-1891) painter
- Joaquim Espalter (1809-1880) painter
- Rosa Maria Gilart Jiménez (1810–1880) embroiderer
- Lluís Rigalt (1814-1894) painter
- Francisco de Paula Van Halen (1814–1887) painter
- Federico de Madrazo (1815–1894) painter
- Carlos Luis de Ribera y Fieve (1815–1891) painter
- Eugenio Lucas Velázquez (1817–1870) painter
- Ángel María Cortellini (1819–1887) painter
- Francisco Lameyer (1825–1877) painter
- Manuel Castellano (1826–1880) painter
- Ramon Martí Alsina (1826-1894) painter
- Carlos de Haes (1829–1898) painter
- Domingo Valdivieso (1830–1872) painter
- Dióscoro Puebla (1831-1901) painter
- José Casado del Alisal (1832-1886) painter
- Plácido Francés y Pascual (1832-1902) painter
- Antonio Gisbert (1834-1901) painter
- Manuel Gómez-Moreno (1834-1918) painter
- Vicente Palmaroli (1834–1896) painter
- Juan de Barroeta (1835–1906) painter
- Pere Borrell del Caso (1835–1910) painter
- Bernardo Ferrándiz Bádenes (1835–1885) painter
- Eduardo Rosales (1836–1873) painter
- Joaquín Agrasot (1837–1919) painter
- Josep Berga i Boix (1837–1914) painter
- José Jiménez Aranda (1837–1903) painter
- Ramón Tusquets (1837–1904) painter
- Serafín Avendaño (1838–1916) painter
- Mariano Fortuny y Marsal (1838–1874) painter
- Modest Urgell (1839–1919) painter
- José Martí y Monsó (1840–1912) painter
- Matías Moreno (1840–1906) painter
- Raimundo de Madrazo y Garreta (1841–1920) painter
- Josep Masriera (1841–1912) painter
- Eduardo Zamacois y Zabala (1841–1871) painter
- Francisco Domingo Marqués (1842–1920) painter
- Francesc Masriera (1842–1902) painter
- Rafael Monleón (1843–1900) painter
- Joaquim Vayreda (1843–1894) painter
- Lorenzo Casanova (1844–1900) painter
- José Echenagusia (1844–1912) painter
- Rogelio de Egusquiza (1845–1915) painter
- Nicolás Megía (1845–1917) painter
- Ángel Lizcano Monedero (1846–1929) painter
- Germán Álvarez Algeciras (1848–1912) painter
- Francisco Pradilla Ortiz (1848–1921) painter
- Romà Ribera (1848–1935) painter
- Ricardo Arredondo Calmache (1850–1911) painter

== Born 1851–1900 ==
- Luis Ricardo Falero (1851–1896)
- Antoni Gaudí (1852–1926) architect
- Ricardo de Madrazo (1852–1917) painter
- Eugenio Oliva (1852–1925) painter
- Casimiro Sainz (1853–1898) painter
- Miquel Carbonell Selva (1854–1896) painter
- José Nicolau Huguet (1855–1909) painter
- Eugenio Lucas Villaamil (1858–1918) painter
- Vicente March (1859–1927) painter
- Gonzalo Bilbao (1860–1938) painter
- Adolfo Guiard (1860–1916) painter
- Santiago Rusiñol (1861–1931) painter
- Pablo Uranga (1861–1934) painter
- Juan Martínez Abades (1862–1920) painter
- Fernanda Frances Arribas (1862–1939) painter
- Laureano Barrau (1863–1957) painter
- Joan Brull (1863–1912) painter
- Manuel García y Rodríguez (1863–1925) painter
- Joaquín Sorolla y Bastida (1863–1923) painter
- Mariano Barbasán (1864–1924) painter
- Enrique Galwey (1864–1931) painter
- Ramon Casas (1866–1932) painter
- José Garnelo (1866–1944) painter
- Enrique Simonet (1866–1927) painter
- Carolina del Castillo Díaz (1867–1933), Spanish painter
- Juan José Gárate (1869–1939) painter
- Antonio Fillol Granell (1870–1930) painter
- Ignacio Zuloaga (1870–1945) painter
- Hermenegildo Anglada Camarasa (1871–1959) painter
- Vicente Castell (1871–1934) painter
- Mariano Fortuny y Madrazo (1871–1949) designer/photographer
- Joaquim Mir (1873–1940) painter
- Julio Vila y Prades (1873–1930) painter/muralist
- Joaquim Sunyer (1874–1956) painter
- Fermín Arango (1974–1962) painter
- Juan de Echevarría (1875–1931) painter
- Josefa Texidor Torres (1875–1914) painter
- Ricard Canals (1876–1931) painter
- Julio González (1876–1942) sculptor
- Aurelio Arteta (1879–1940) painter
- Julio Romero de Torres (1880–1930) painter
- Pablo Gargallo (1881–1934) sculptor
- Pablo Picasso (1881–1973) painter/sculptor
- María Roësset Mosquera (1882–1921) painter
- Daniel Vázquez Díaz (1882–1969) painter
- Lorenzo Aguirre (1884–1942) painter
- José de Creeft (1884–1982) sculptor
- José Gutiérrez Solana (1886–1945) painter
- Juan Gris (1887–1927) painter/sculptor
- Mariano Andreu (1888–1976) painter
- María Blanchard (1881–1932) painter
- José Moya del Piño (1891–1969) painter/muralist
- Fernando Tarazona (1893–1979) painter/scenographer/muralist
- Joan Miró (1893–1983) painter/sculptor
- Benjamín Palencia (1894–1980) painter
- Pedro Flores Garcia (1897–1967) painter
- Francisco Bores Lopez (1898–1972) painter
- Francisco Albert (b. 1900-unknown) painter

== Born 1901–1950 ==
- Esteban Vicente (1903–2001) painter
- Salvador Dalí (1904–1989) painter
- Marisa Roësset Velasco (1904–1976), painter
- Óscar Domínguez (1906–1957) painter
- Alfonso Ponce de León (1906–1936) painter
- Antonio León Ortega (1907–1991) painter
- Jorge Oteiza (1908–2003) sculptor
- Pablo Serrano (1908–1985) sculptor
- Remedios Varo (1908–1963) painter
- Emilio Grau Sala (1911–1975) painter
- Eugenio Fernández Granell (1912–2001) painter
- Carlos Ferreira de la Torre (1914-1990)
- José Caballero (1915–1991) painter
- Joan Josep Tharrats (1918-2001) painter
- César Manrique (1919-1992) painter, sculptor, architect
- Menchu Gal (1919–2008) painter
- Joan Brotat (1920–1990) painter
- José Puyet (1922-2004) impressionist painter
- Albert Rafols Casamada (1923-2009) painter
- Antoni Tàpies (1923–2012) painter
- Eduardo Chillida (1924–2002) sculptor
- Modest Cuixart (1925–2007) painter
- Margaret Modlin (1927–1998) US-born painter
- Laurent Jiménez-Balaguer (1928-2015) painter
- José Comas Quesada (1928–1993) painter
- Jesús Peñarreal (1930–2008) painter
- Paquita Sabrafen (born 1931) painter
- Jordi Pagans i Monsalvatje (born 1932) painter
- Gaston Orellana (born 1933) painter
- Trini Tinturé, (born 1935), cartoonist and illustrator
- Antonio López García (born 1936) painter
- Eduardo Arroyo (born 1937) painter
- Concha Jerez (born 1941), multidisciplinary conceptual artist
- Monirul Islam (born 1942) painter
- Soledad Sevilla (born 1944), painter, installation artist
- Ramón Castellano de Torres (born 1947) painter
- Glòria Muñoz (born 1949) painter
- Marika Vila (born 1949), comics artist and writer; feminist sociologist
- Elena Blasco (born 1950), painter, photographer, installation artist
- Francesc Torres (born 1948), video artist, photographer

== Born 1951–2000 ==
- Serrano Bou (born 1952) painter and visual artist
- Manuel Chabrera (born 1952) architect and artist
- Juan Muñoz (1953–2001) sculptor
- Luis Royo (born 1954) painter and illustrator
- José Alfonso Morera Ortiz "El Hortelano" (born 1954) painter and sculptor
- Pep Duran (born 1955), sculptor and painter
- Francesca Llopis (born 1956) painter
- Antonio Peris Carbonell (born 1957) painter and sculptor
- Camil Bofill (born 1957) painter and sculptor
- Miquel Barceló (born 1957) painter
- Francisco López (born 1964) musician and sound artist
- Alicia Martín Villanueva (born 1964) sculptor with books
- Itziar Okariz (born 1965) painter, sculptor, performance artist
- Javier Cambre (born 1966) sculptor, photographer, and video artist
- Lydia Zimmermann (born 1966) filmmaker and video artist
- Eva Navarro (born 1967) painter
- Roberta Marrero (born 1972), illustrator and visual artist
- Cris Ortega (born 1980), painter, writer, and comics artist
- Pablo Rey (born 1968) painter
- Laura Pérez Vernetti (born 1958), cartoonist and illustrator
- Roberto Parada (born 1969) painter and illustrator
- Enrique Radigales (born 1970) painter and multimedia
- Jorge Velasco Navarro (born 1971) painter
- Esperanza Zabala (born 1974) painter, sculptor, graphic designer
- Sixeart (or Sergio Hidalgo Parades) (born 1975) painter and sculptor
- Nuria Garcia Masip (b. 1978) Calligrapher of Arabic Calligraphy
- Felipe Cardeña (born 1979) painter, collage, performance
- Mit Borrás (born 1982) installation, multimedia and conceptual art
- Carla Berrocal (born 1983), comics illustrator
- Patricia Dauder (born 1983), multidisciplinary conceptual artist
- Camila Cañeque (1984–2024), conceptual, performance artist and philosopher
- Claudia Maté (born 1985), digital media artist and curator
- Bisila Noha (born 1988), ceramic and multi-media artist
- Anabel Colazo (born 1993), illustrator and cartoonist
- Ana Pérez Ventura (born1981), visual artist and pianist

== See also ==
- List of Spanish architects
