= José Ferrer (disambiguation) =

José Ferrer (1912–1992) was a Puerto Rican actor, theater and film director.

José Ferrer may also refer to:

- José C. Ferrer (born 1964), American jockey
- José Ferrer (bobsleigh) (born 1965), Puerto Rican Olympic bobsledder
- José Ferrer (guitarist) (1835–1916), Spanish guitarist and composer
- José Ferrer (Puerto Rican footballer) (born 1996), Puerto Rican football player
- José Ferrer Canales (1913–2005), Puerto Rican educator, writer and pro-independence political activist
- José Ferrer de Couto (1820–1877), Spanish journalist
- José Ferrer (Spanish footballer) (born 1950), retired Spanish footballer
- José Figueres Ferrer (1906–1990), president of Costa Rica
- José Joaquín de Ferrer (1763–1818), Spanish Basque astronomer
- José Ramón Ferrer (born 1968), Mexican sprint canoer
- José Daniel Ferrer (born 1970), Cuban human rights activist
- José A. Ferrer, baseball player
