= Juan Gárate =

Juan Gárate may refer to:

- Juan José Gárate (1869–1939), Spanish painter
- Juan Manuel Gárate (born 1976), Spanish professional road racing cyclist
