= Bofill =

Bofill is a surname. Notable people with the surname include:

- Angela Bofill (1954–2024), Latin-American R&B singer-songwriter
- Anna Bofill (born 1944), Catalan Spanish pianist, architect and composer
- Camil Bofill (born 1957, Torelló), Spanish Catalan painter and sculptor
- Ricardo Bofill (1939–2022), Spanish architect

== See also ==
- Bonfilh (or Bofill), troubadour
- Ricardo Bofill Taller de Arquitectura, Spanish architecture firm founded in 1963
