= Alonso Pita da Veiga =

Spanish military officer

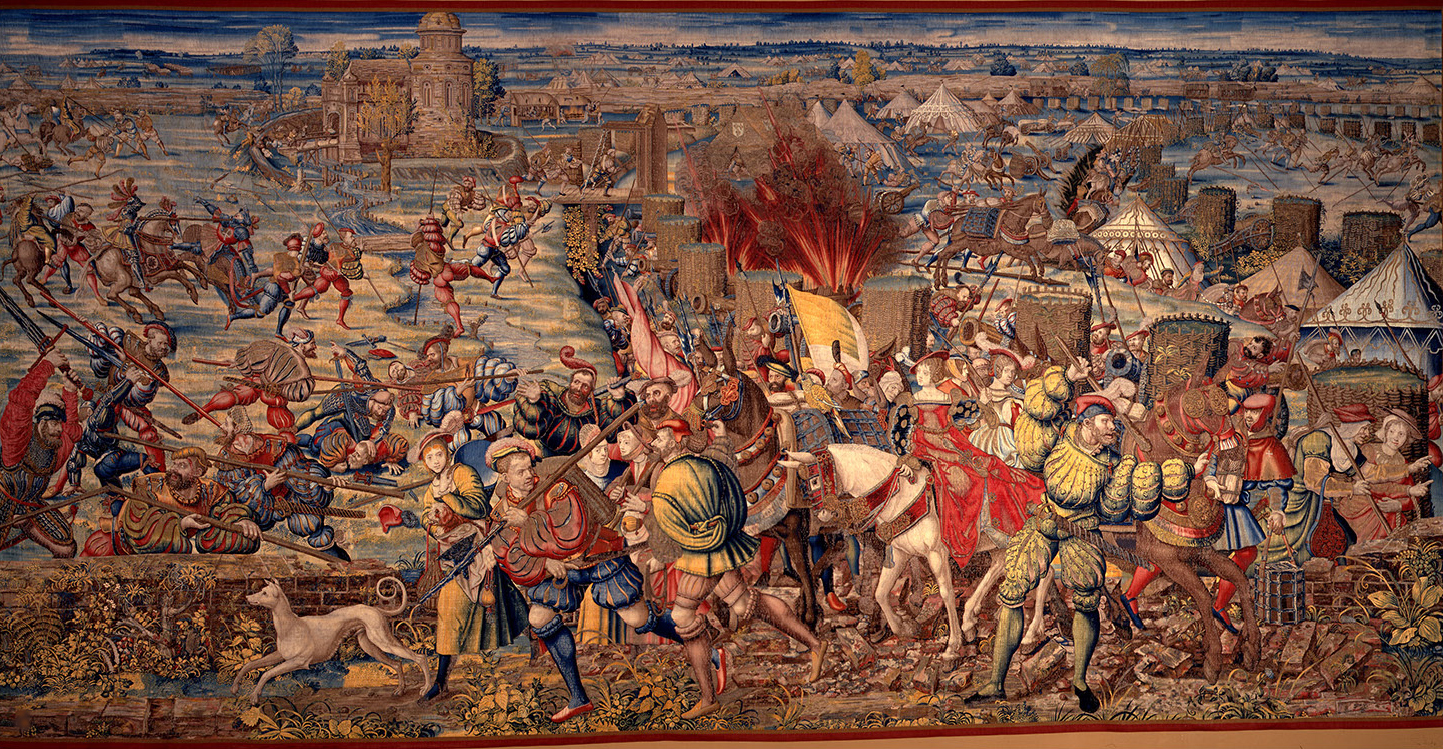
The Battle of Pavia (1525)

Alonso Pita da Veiga (born 1485–1490 in Ferrol, A Coruña, died 1554 in Pontedeume, A Coruña), was a Galician nobleman and military officer. He was among the commanders of the Spanish Tercios fighting under the orders of Count Fernando de Andrade in the Battle of Pavia, and in other battles of the Italian Wars between 1513 and 1525. He was granted land and property in Ferrolterra, his birthplace, and a new coat of arms for having captured, on the battlefield, the king of France, Francis I.

== Decree awarding coat of arms ==
The decree granting a coat of arms to Alonso Pita da Veiga was archived at the General Archive of Simancas (Archivo general de Simancas, legajo 388, rotulado de "Mercedes y Privilegios.") and was issued by Emperor Charles V on 24 July 1529, four years after the Battle of Pavia. A verbatim text of the decree can be found in, among other 19th century Spanish books, in the book Crisol historico espanol y restauracion de glorias nacionales, published in Havana, Cuba in 1862 by the Spanish historian José Ferrer de Couto. A summary of the document, in English translation, gives the following details:

"Alonso Pita da Veiga, Galician, and our vassal" served his majesty well in several battles including the Battle of Bicencio and the Battle of Vicoca.

In regards to the Battle of Pavia, the decree states that Alonso Pita da Veiga recaptured the standard " ... of His Most Serene Infante Don Fernando, who is now King of Hungary, Our most dear and loved son and brother, which bore the insignia of Our Duchy of Burgundy, which the French had taken when the standard-bearer was killed”. This refers to the standard of Ferdinand, the brother of Charles V, whose troops fought at Pavia. For this action, Alonso Pita da Veiga was awarded 600 gold ducats.

In regards to the capture of King Francis I of France, the decree states "and in the same battle, you accomplished so much that you reached the person of said King (Francis I of France) and captured him, jointly with the other persons that captured him.” So, in effect, Charles V credited a group of individuals, and not a single individual, with the capture of King Francis I. For that action, Alonso Pita da Veiga was awarded the sum of 30,0000 maravedís per year, for life, "above and beyond your pay as an hombre de arma". "Hombre de arma" was a term used in that era to signify a mounted warrior as opposed to a foot soldier.

The decree states that Alonso Pita da Veiga took from Francis I of France the following: "and you took from him his left gauntlet and a brocade decorated with four crosses of silver cloth and a crucifix made of the True Cross, of which events the same King of France gave testimony in a document signed by his own hand."

The decree then awards Alonso Pita da Veiga a coat of arms, described in the decree, that incorporates the different elements of his deeds at the Battle of Pavia:

“A coat of arms, quartered, the first quarter colored the color of blood and in it a gauntlet as a symbol that you took said King of France, and a royal Crown of gold above of said gauntlet; and in the lower quarter, a blue field with three gold fleur-de-lis which are the true arms of the Kings of France; and in the right quarter with the field colored as the superior quarter and in it the brocade decorated with its crosses; and the left quarter, likewise colored, and in it the said standard of the Most Serene King of Hungary with the arms of Our Duchy of Burgundy.”

== See also ==
- Habsburg Spain First Habsburg of Spain i.e.: Charles I of Spain who was also Emperor Charles V
