= Granell =

Granell is a surname. Notable people with the name include:

- Adrià Granell (born 1986), Spanish footballer
- Álex Granell (born 1988), Spanish footballer
- Amado Granell (1898–1972), Spanish military officer
- Antonio Fillol Granell (1870–1930), Spanish painter in the Social Realist style
- Enrique Sapena Granell (1930–2008), Spanish politician
- Eugenio Granell (1912–2001), Spanish surrealist, artist, professor, musician and writer
- Francesc Granell (1944–2022), Spanish economist and academic
- Juan Granell Pascual (1902–1962), Spanish politician, official and businessman
