= Jorge Velasco Navarro =

Spanish painter (born 1971)

- Born: January 11, 1971 (age 55)
- Occupation: Painter
- Years active: 1987–present
- Parents: Francisco Velasco Rodriguez (father); Teresa Navarro Valero (mother)
- Website: www.velascoart.com

Signature
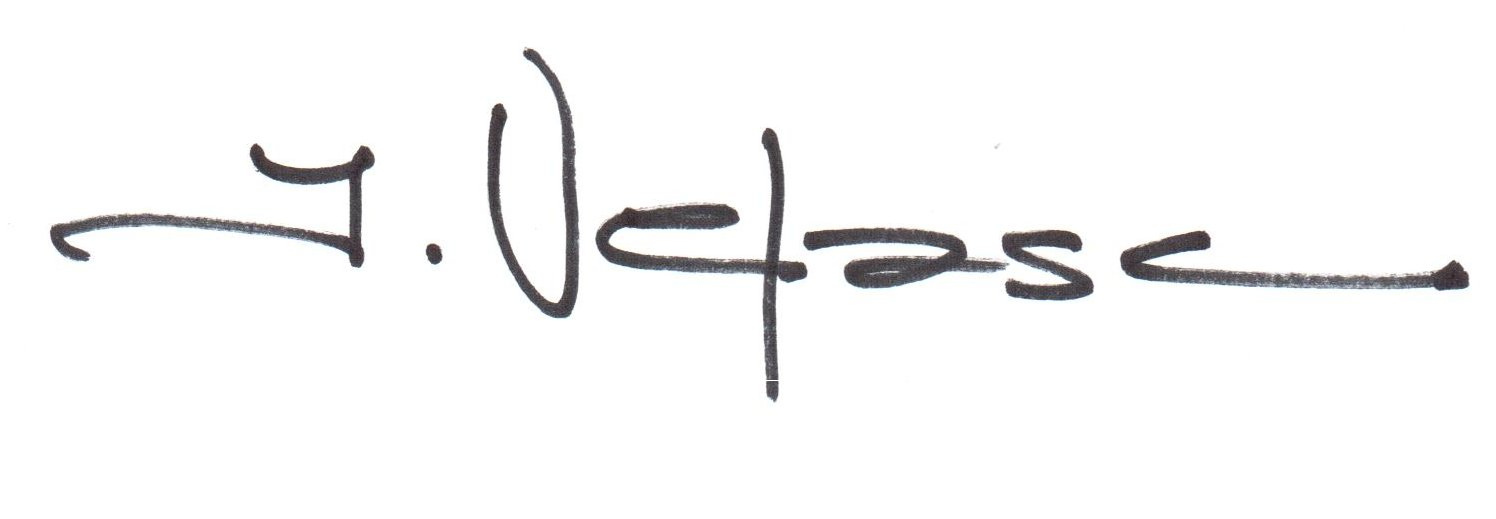

Jorge Velasco Navarro (born 1971) is a Spanish painter born in Madrid. He is the son of Teresa Navarro Valero, designer and founder of the textile brand in 1955 with the same name and father Francisco Velasco Rodriguez, also a businessman, painter and writer.

== Exhibitions ==
- 1989 Living Gardens, City of Madrid
- 1991 Oil paintings, Jorge Velasco Navarro, exhibit entitled Contrasts in the Exhibition Hall of the Cultural Center José de Espronceda, in Almansa, Madrid
- 1993 Exhibition of paintings and sculptures by the brothers J. Velasco, Exhibition Hall of the Cultural Center San Juan Bautista, San Nemesio, S / N. Madrid.
- 1993 Exhibition of Contemporary Painting J. Velasco, Tetuan Cultural Center. C / Bravo Murillo, 251, Madrid.
- 1993 Jorge Velasco Navarro exhibition at the Cultural Center “El Torito”. Avda. De Moratalaz, S / N. Madrid.
- 1993 Contrmporánea and Painting Exhibition “Collages” by the brothers Jorge Velasco Navarro and Josechu Velasco Navarro, the Bohemians 1 Cultural Center, Madrid
- 1993 Exhibition: Artists of the Future (Art Collage) J. Velasco Brothers in the Huerta de la Salud I Cultural Center, C / Mar de las Antillas, S / N. Madrid.
- 1994 Sculpture “Female Silhouette” sold at art auctions, Duran House, Calle Serrano 12-1 ^, Madrid
- 1995-2008 Exposed outside Spain, among the most important exhibitions of the artist Jorge Velasco Navarro, include Miami (Florida) USA and Florence Italy
- 2009 Exhibition Jorge Velasco Navarro, in Excellence Fair, at the Castle of Peralada, Carrer Sant Antoni, 0, 17491 Peralada, Girona
- 2010 Exposition Jorge Velasco Navarro, Buddha Hall, Ctra. De La Coruna, Km8,700, 28023 Madrid
- 2010 Exhibition entitled “Verso Est” Jorge Velasco Navarro, in Artebar La Latina, C / S. Bruno 3 Madrid.
- 2011 Exhibition entitled: Flash of Genius (Destellos de Genio), Exhibition Hall of the District of Retiro, Av Ciudad de Barcelona. 162, Madrid.

== Works ==
Among his best known works are:

- 1989 Christ,
- 1990 The Suit
- 1991 The Warrior
- 1992 Shoes Bonito
- 1993 Lady with Dog
- 1995 El Asadero
- 1996 La Carbonera
- 1998 Dragonflies
- 2000 Cascorro
- 2001 Windmills
- 2005 Broom
- 2006 Volumes
- 2007 Ojos de Torro
- 2009 Volumes and Lands
- 2011 Depression, Menina
- 2012-2013 Cubist Portraits
- 2014-2015 Between Mirrors, Inspiration
