= Nicolás Megía =

Spanish painter

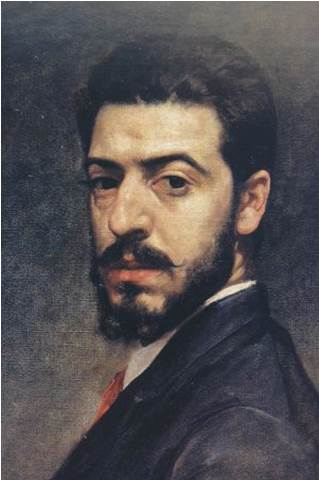
Self-portrait (c. 1880)

Nicolás Megía Márquez (6 December 1845 – 15 April 1917) was a Spanish painter in the Academic and Realistic styles. He was known mostly for historical costumbrista paintings; many of which were watercolors.

== Biography ==
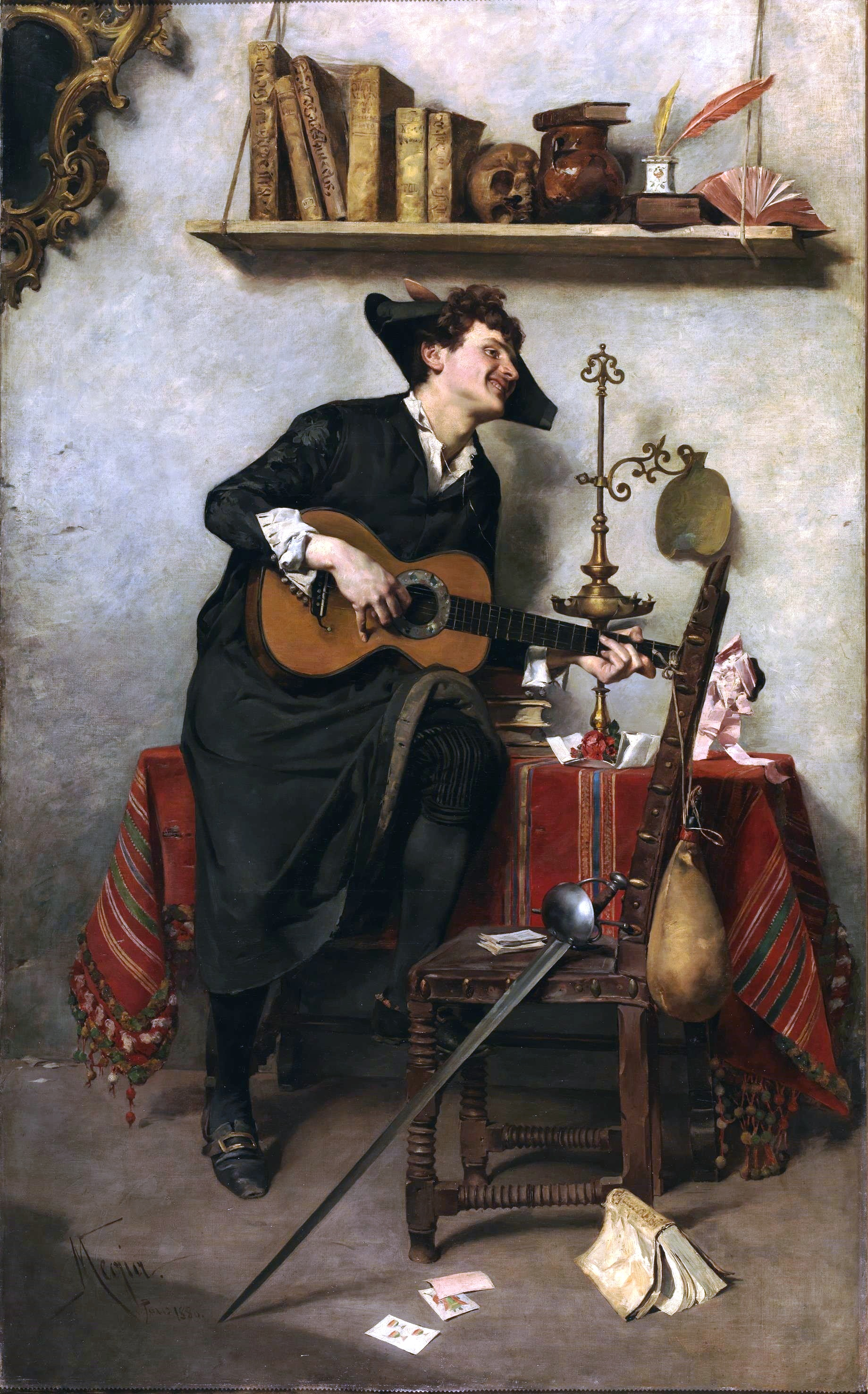
"Laboremus" (Student Playing the Guitar)

He was born in Fuente de Cantos, and received his first art instruction at the "Escuela Especial de Pintura, Escultura y Grabado", a branch of the Real Academia de Bellas Artes de San Fernando, where he studied from 1866 to 1870 with Domingo Valdivieso and Federico de Madrazo. After graduating, he received a stipend from the Diputación Provincial de Badajoz, which enabled him to study abroad.

From 1872 to 1878, he studied in Rome with Marià Fortuny and at the Accademia Chigi, where he was influenced by the Macchiaioli. He then went to Paris and worked with Jean-Louis-Ernest Meissonier until 1880. By this time, he was already very popular with art dealers. His works were distributed throughout Europe and North America by a German firm. In 1880, he participated in the Salon, presenting his historical genre work "Laboremus" at a time when most of the exhibitors were impressionists.

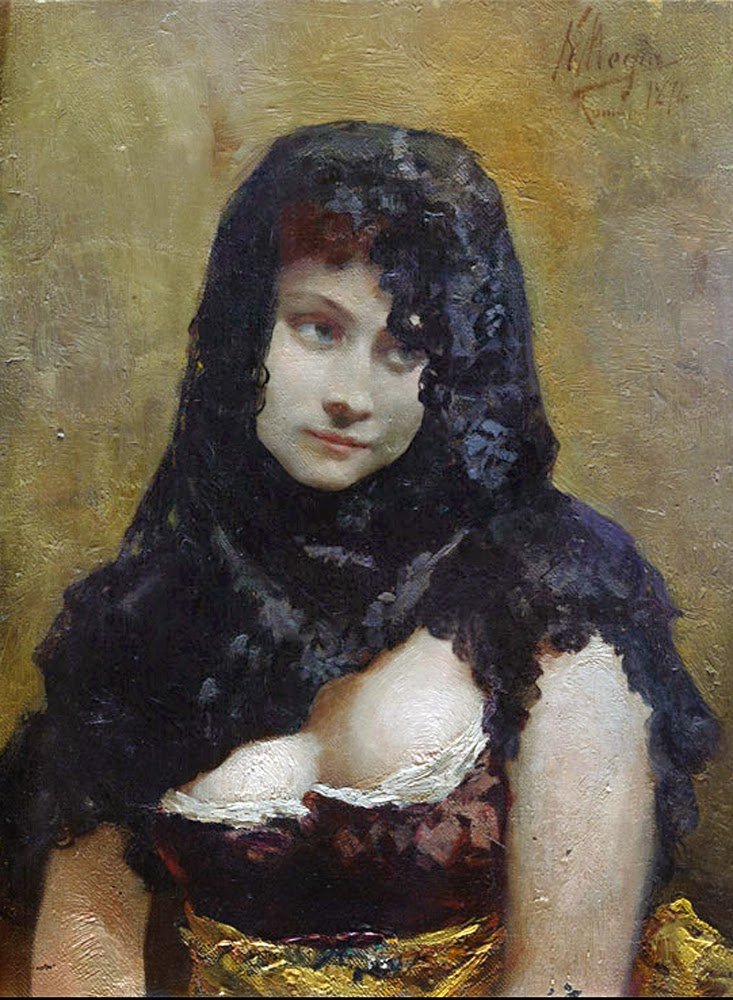
Young Woman in a Blue Shawl

Upon returning to Madrid, his successes led him to important positions in several art-related organizations, including the presidency of the Sociedad de Aquarellistas (watercolorists) and the chair of painting at the Escuela Superior de Artes e Industrias. He was appointed a tutor to the sisters of King Alfonso XII.

He was a regular participant in the exhibitions at the Círculo de Bellas Artes and the National Exhibition of Fine Arts, where he won second prize in 1890 for his portrayal of a scene from the defense of Zaragoza.

After his death in 1917, he was somewhat forgotten. In 1995, there was an attempt to stage a retrospective at the Museo de Bellas Artes de Badajoz, to mark the 150th anniversary of his birth, but it never came to fruition due to lack of funds. In 2002, the first monograph of Megía was published by the Fundación Caja de Badajoz. Finally, in 2011, the museum was able to stage a retrospective but, despite a great deal of effort put into locating and restoring his canvases, received negative criticism for focusing on his most Academic works, which were not considered representative. He died in Madrid, aged 71.
