= Carolina del Castillo Díaz =

Spanish painter (1867–1933)

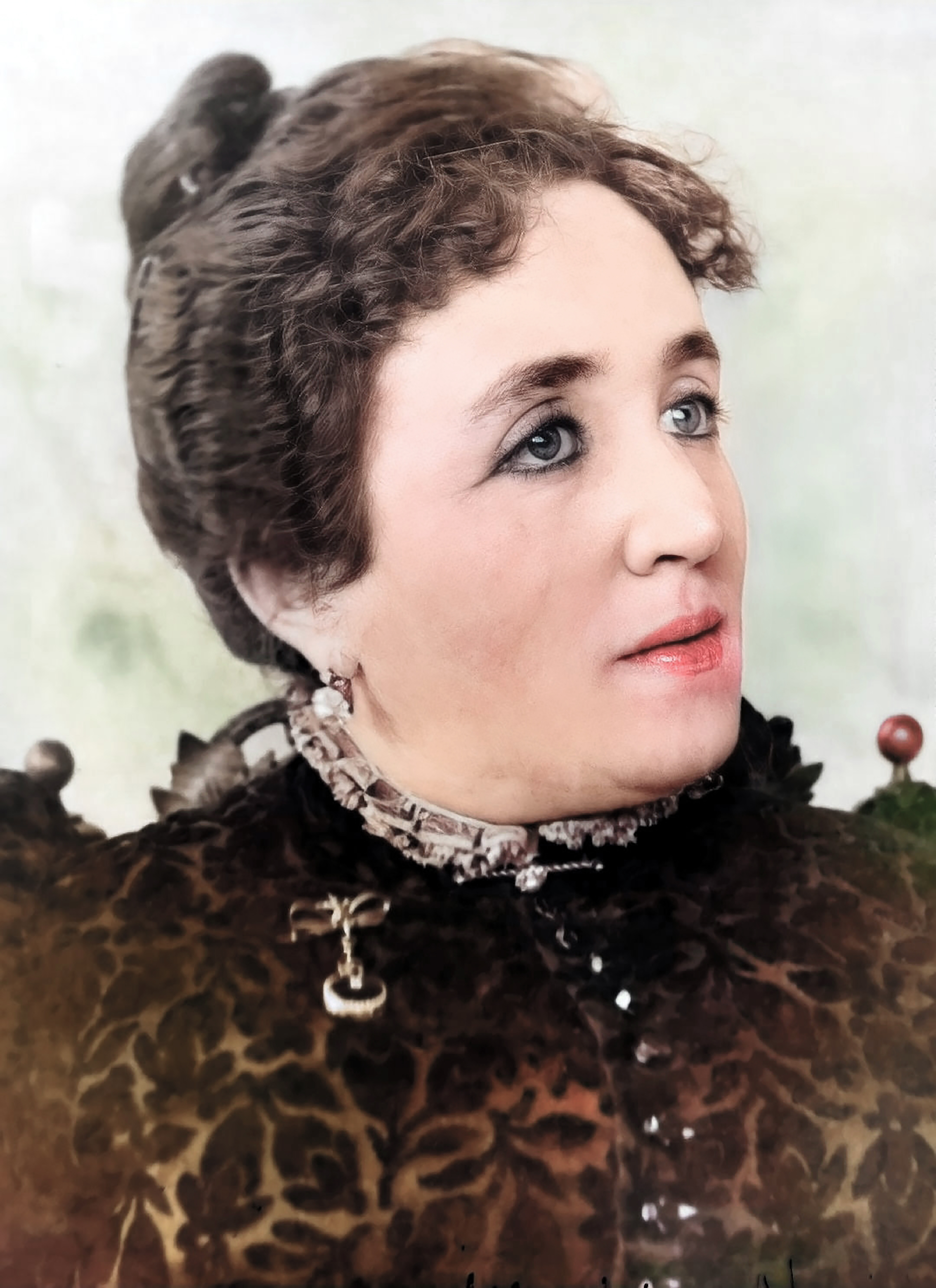
- Carolina del Castillo Díaz, 1926
- Born: Carolina del Castillo y Díaz; 3 July 1867; Gijón, Asturias, Spain
- Died: 24 October 1933 (aged 66); Gijón, Asturias, Spain
- Other names: Carolina del Castillo, Krol-Ina
- Occupation: Painter
- Spouse: Gonzalo del Campo y del Castillo (m. 1890–)
- Children: 6
- Father: Justo del Castillo Quintana

Carolina del Castillo Díaz (3 July 1867 – 24 October 1933) was a Spanish painter. In the 20th century she was one of the earliest noted female painters in Asturias. She is known for her oil paintings of landscapes, portraits, still lifes, nudes, and interior scenes. She also used the pseudonym Krol-Ina.

== Biography ==
Carolina del Castillo Díaz was born on 3 July 1867, in Gijón, Asturias, Spain. She was the daughter of Carolina Díaz de Calderón y Cifuentes, and industrial engineer Justo del Castillo Quintana. At a young age she took an interest in making art.

She married a military doctor named Gonzalo del Campo y del Castillo on 28 July 1890, with whom she had six children. After the death of two of her children, she decided to learn to formally paint. She was a student of José Nicolau Huguet and Cecilio Plá y Gallardo in Madrid.

She is known for her oil paintings of landscapes, still lifes, portraits (particularly of children), nudes, and interior scenes. Her painting "The Soul of the House", received an honorable mention in 1908 at the Exposición Nacional de Bellas Artes, an honorable mention in 1909 at the Hispano-French Exhibition in Zaragoza, and received a third-place medal in 1909 at the Galician Regional Exhibition in Santiago de Compostela.

She died on 24 October 1933, at her home in the Jove neighborhood of Gijón.
