= Javier Cambre =

- Born: Xavier-Evaristo Cambre; San Juan, Puerto Rico
- Education: School of the Art Institute of Chicago, School of Architecture at Universidad de Puerto Rico
- Known for: Photography, Painting, Sculpture
- Website: Official website

Javier Cambre -born Xavier Cambre in San Juan, Puerto Rico, is a contemporary artist with dual citizenships from the USA and Spain, working in diverse media such as drawing, photography, collage, painting, text and sculpture. His maternal grandfather was the poet Evaristo Ribera Chevremont.

After earning with High Honors an Associate Degree in Engineering, Cambre studied architecture at Universidad de Puerto Rico (B. Arch. Design, Magna Cum Laude), Columbia University and at Universidad Pontificia Bolivariana (Dipl. Arquitecto) in Colombia. In 1998 Cambre graduated from the School of the Art Institute of Chicago with a Master of Fine Arts (Painting) and was awarded a fellowship at the Whitney Independent Study Program, which he decided not to pursue after moving to NYC and spending two weeks in the program. Nevertheless, 4 years later he was selected to exhibit his work in the 2002 Whitney Biennial. Cambre is a tenured professor in the Art and Design department at Queensborough Community College, City University of New York, where he has taught since the year 2000.

Cambre has exhibited his work at the 2002 Whitney Biennial, MoMA-P.S. 1 Contemporary Art Center, the Brooklyn Museum, the Sculpture Center, the Center for Curatorial Studies at Bard College, El Museo del Barrio and the Moore Space in Miami. He has also exhibited his work in museums in Spain, Puerto Rico, Russia and Argentina. Cambre has been awarded residencies at the Headlands Center for the Arts in Sausalito, CA, and at MoMA PS1 National Studio Program, as well as artist grants from the New York Foundation for the Arts, the National Association of Latino Arts and Culture, the New Jersey Council on the Arts and the Research Foundation of the City University of New York. His work is in the collections of the Whitney Museum and the Museo de Arte de Puerto Rico. Cambre's oeuvre has been discussed in publications such as the New York Times, Washington Post, New York Magazine, Tema Celeste, Sculpture Magazine, Arts Monthly, and Art Nexus among others.

== Publications ==
- Black Box (2016; ISBN 9781367851856) is Cambre's first published photo book.
- Vacuus Bacchus (2016; ISBN 9781367180246) is a series of color-tinted black & white photographs which explores the relation between Eros and Nothingness.
- Soundtrack (2018; ISBN 9781389058172) Cambre's Soundtrack interplays with the structural systems of communication (spatial, graphic, musical and linguistic) and the unfolding points where they deconstruct and open up to new visual and poetic possibilities.
- Chamber Music (2020; ISBN 9781714283767) is Cambre's fourth publication, taking to a new level the explorations of his previous book, Soundtrack. Chamber Music presents works raging from photography, painting and text to architectural drawings and indeterminate music notation.
