= Francesca Llopis =

Spanish artist

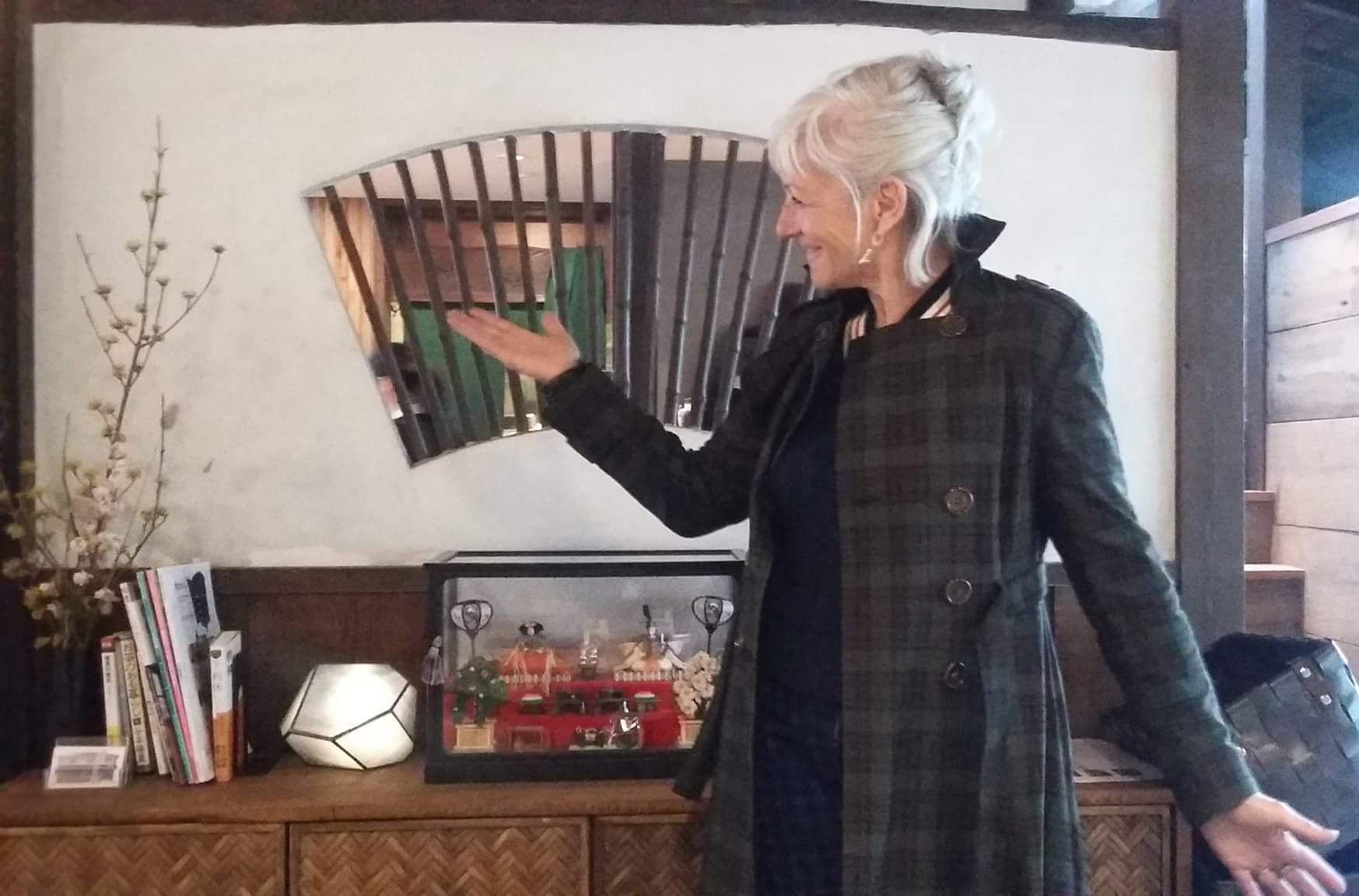
FrancescaLlopisWiki

Francesca Llopis (Barcelona, 1956) is a visual artist from Barcelona. She began exhibiting in 1981. Her works are based and focused on her travels and on nature, mainly working on painting, drawing and video installations and collaborating with other artists such as Barbara Held and Robert Waytt. "Painting, drawing and image in movement are the basis and the main instrumental from which arises the system where I start any proposal".

She has participated in some exhibitions in Spain, France, Switzerland, the United States, Italy, Germany, Korea, China, Colombia, Argentina, Brazil, Taiwan, and Japan.

== Style ==
Her trajectory and pictorial work begins with the architecture and the influences of the Neo-expressionism movement of the 80s, which serve her to represent the urban culture. She is interested in the city for its urban planning, the city seen from above, and that is why she often uses the labyrinth as a metaphor for defining the city.

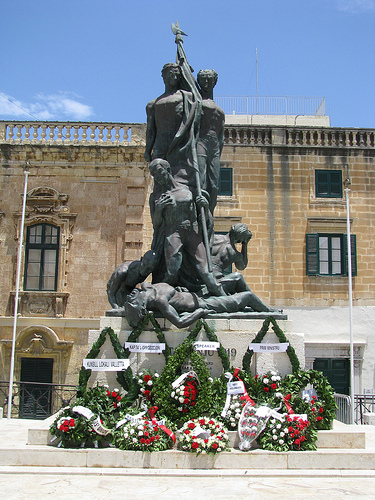

Her influences come, mainly, from the abstract expressionism of the American painting and from artists such as Louise Bourgeois, Judy Chicago, Meret Oppenheim, Nancy Spero and Eva Hesse.

Her latest works, of a more poetic and political nature, are made to be the viewer who completes them.

== Artistic and professional career ==
In 1976 Francesca Llopis enrolled at escola EINA where she meets Dani Freixes, América Sánchez, Albert Ràfols-Casamada, Maria Girona and Manel Esclusa, among others. Between 1979 and 1981 she shares an interior design studio with Josep Maria Civit and Ton Auquer and obtains an artistic residence grant at the Teater Studio in the Pałac Kultury in Warsaw. The inevitable and foreseeable coup d'etat transforms and creates a new pictorial imaginary to the artist, making her to question the lyrical abstraction of her first stage. From this inflection point, the "trip" will constitute a fundamental part of her process in the artistic work. Between 1983 and 1986, she begins her professional career: Història d'una temptació (History of a temptation) at MedaMOTHI in Montpellier, Barcelona trasbalsada (Barcelona overwhelmed) at Metronome and Els dits gèlids (The Frozen fingers) at Maeght gallery, in Barcelona, and Tráfico de efectos (Traffic of effects) at Montenegro gallery in Madrid. In 1988, she has an artist's residence at the Accademia di Roma and at the École des Beaux Arts of Nîmes, where Arnau Puig defines her painting as "semantic structuralism" in reference to her obsession with the built space and the meaning of words. In 2002 she presents her first video installation 2 habitacions amb vistes (2 rooms with views), a social portrait of Barcelona. In 2004 she develops ETC as a work in progress to discuss the absence of women artists in the history of art. In 2009, a new pictorial stage begins where inks and notebooks are assembled randomly, rising to different artistic artefacts, films and murals. In 2015, she participates in the Biennial of Noseden (Art line), in Japan, with Dealers of memory, which consists of two interventions: the video installation Apunts per un iceberg (Notes for an iceberg), in the Kurokawana school and the installation Llibre de llàgrimes (Book of tears) in the Myoken temple where she relates the intimate and the public, the original and the Universe. In 2016, in the SakaiArtePorto exhibition in Japan, she makes the installation Traction action from joining humanity to the Universe through an infinity made with pink pigmental footprints from the city's walkers. She makes a residence on performance at Art in Nature in Busan, Korea. In 2017, she presents the installation Llum! (Light!) with neon and glass at Montjuïc Castle in Barcelona, as a reflection of historical memory, the performance us & the state of things in Köln, Barcelona and other places, and Big Draw at Picasso Museum in Barcelona with Insecta'm and Enjardina't (Insect me and Garden yourself).

== Individual and permanent exhibitions ==
(selection)

- La societat és una flor carnívora, Sala Vinçon (Barcelona, Spain, 1993) and Westwerk (Hamburg, Germany, 1993)
- Brot de Rauxa, installation, Pla de la Catedral de Barcelona, with collaboration from Barbara Held (music), Paloma Unzeta (trapeze), Festival “Dia de la terra” (Barcelona, Spain, 1995)
- Paranys foscos, installation (Capella de sant Roc, Valls and El Roser, Lleida, Spain, 1996) and Un embolic magnífic, Espai (Girona, Spain, 1996)
- Malaltes d'amor, installation at Kulturforum (Lübeck, Germany, 1999)
- La via làctia, installation with Begoña Egurbide at Barcelona underground, Valldaura station (Barcelona, Spain, 2001)
- 2 habitacions amb vistes, video-installation, Centre d'Art Santa Mònica (Barcelona, Spain, 2002)
- Artista!, Canal 33 (Barcelona, Spain, 2008)
- Apunts d'un iceberg, video-installation, Creadors en Residencia, Institut Fort Pius (Barcelona, Spain, 2011)
- 7 murals, permanent work, Mercat de la Boqueria with Carme Pinós (Barcelona, Spain, 2011)
- Nosaltres & l’estat de les coses, Museu Molí Paperer (Capellades, España, 2018)

== Collective work and festivals ==
(selection)

- Cinco chicas, Buades gallery (Madrid, Spain); Saló de tardor, Saló del Tinell (Barcelona, Spain, 1982)
- Artur Cravant, performance with Carles Hac Mor, Ciento gallery (Barcelona, Spain); Casino, Miró Foundation (Barcelona, Spain, 1983)
- 6.8.89 Tian’anmen, Hospitalet-Art (Barcelona, Spain, 1989)
- Les allumés (Nantes, France, 1990)
- Enigma, Sala Montcada "la Caixa" Foundation (Barcelona, Spain, 1993)
- Drums, desire, after summer "Z-A", video with Barbara Held, “Store front for art and architecture” (Nova York, EUA, 2007)
- ETC and Eucaliptus, installation at ”Festival de cine de mujeres”, Saura Foundation, (Cuenca, Spain, 2010)
- OSAKA 1, video-installation, CosmoCaixa, SCREEN Festival (Barcelona, Spain, 2012)
- New iceberg, video-installation, “Guerrilha festival” (São Paulo. Brasil, 2012)
- Ruidos silencio , Juan Naranjo (Barcelona, Spain, 2017)

== Grants, prizes and editions ==
(selection)

- Joan Miró International Drawing Prize, Fundació Miró (Barcelona, Spain, 1981)
- Grant of the Ministry of Culture (Spain, 1981, 1996); Grant from the Generalitat de Catalunya (Spain, 1983, 1990, 2001, 2003, 2007)
- Grant at the Acaddemia de Roma, Foreign Affairs Ministry (Spain, 1988); Grant at the l'École des Beaux-Arts de Nimes (France, 1989)
- Prize of artistic trajectory, Institut de la Dona, Generalitat de Catalunya (Barcelona, Spain, 2002)
- Art i futur, editing of lithographs (Barcelona, Spain, 2015)
- Poster of the Passió d’Olesa (Barcelona, 2017)

== Bibliography ==
- David Hodges, Francesca Llopis, Luc Tuymans. Enigma. Barcelona, Fundació "La Caixa", 1994.
- Francesca Llopis. Un Embolic magnífic. Fundació Espais, 1997.
- Francesca Llopis. Duc un cuc al cap. Barcelona, Fundació Espais d'Art Contemporani, 2006.
- Francesca Llopis. Paranys Foscos. Lleida, Ajuntament de Lleida; Valls: FAC, 1997.
