= José Puyet =

Spanish painter

- José Puyet
- Born: José Puyet Padilla; April 22, 1922; Málaga, Spain
- Died: August 28, 2004 (aged 82); Madrid, Spain
- Education: José Padilla (grandfather)
- Known for: Painting
- Movement: Modern Impressionism

José Puyet (April 22, 1922 – August 28, 2004), full name José Puyet Padilla, was a Spanish, modern impressionist painter, whose popularity spread throughout Spain and the United States.

== Early life ==
Puyet was born in Málaga, Spain. He was grandson of teacher José Padilla, a Spanish artist who began painting in the nineteenth century. As a child, Puyet learned to paint by watching his grandfather, whose company he preferred to that of children his own age. By age eight, he had started working in pencils and oils. At age 20, Puyet entered the Spanish military, due to World War II, and was sent to the exclave of Melilla. The experience deepened his observations of new personages and atmospheres. His superiors learned of his talent and would often relieve him of guard duty to allow him to create paintings of the families of the High Commanders.

== Career ==
Upon his return to Málaga, Puyet ventured out on his own as an inspired artist. He moved to Madrid where he found life difficult. He often shared rooms with truck drivers and whoever else would allow him. He purchased art supplies with the little money he had and painted various scenes of people at work. He also found work painting pictures to decorate crypts and mausoleums, and packaging of perfumes and creams.

Puyet's art eventually earned him a favorable reputation. He gave his first exhibition at Carrera de San Jerónimo de Madrid. The exhibition was a success that led to 42 more exhibitions until Carrera de San Jerónimo de Madrid finally closed. Puyet also exhibited in Barcelona, Valencia, Málaga, San Francisco, New York City, Montreal, Miami, Monterrey, San Mateo, California, Houston, Boston, Hamburg, Berlin, Munich, and Milán.

In 1984, Puyet was listed in the publication Who's Who in Art. In 1988, he was inducted as a member of the Real Academy of Fine Art of San Telmo, in Málaga.

== Legacy ==
Today, his works are owned by families such as the House of Alba and the House of Grimaldi. Plácido Domingo and Luis Olivo maintain sizable collections of Puyet's work.

Puyet died from a cerebral hemorrhage on August 28, 2004, in Madrid at 82 years of age.
