= Francesc Torres (artist) =

Catalonian video artist

- Born: Francesc Torres i Iturrioz; 1948 (age 76–77); Barcelona, Spain
- Known for: Installation art
- Notable work: Entropy, Destiny and Junk; Memory Remains

Francesc Torres (born Francesc Torres i Iturrioz, 1948 in Barcelona, Spain) is a Catalan-born video artist who is based in New York. His work is influenced by politics, sociology, history and culture.

== Work ==
His work has been widely exhibited internationally, and was included in the Art at the Armory exhibition organized by the Museum of Contemporary Art Chicago. He exhibited the installation, Entropy, Destiny and Junk, consisting of seven junkyard cars on a field of raked sand along with a video consisting of news footage on Ronald Reagan, the Los Angeles riots, Palestinians and Israelis and boxers fighting in a ring. In another installation, Memory Remains, Torres displayed objects recovered from the 9/11 ground zero to "convey the trauma of the attacks".

== Collections ==
Torres' work is held in the permanent collection of the Barcelona Museum of Contemporary Art, the Whitney Museum of American Art, the International Center of Photography, the Museum of Modern Art, among other venues.
