= Enrique Radigales =

Spanish artist (born 1970)

Enrique Radigales (born 1970 in Zaragoza, Spain) is a contemporary Spanish artist, who studied at Escola Massana de Barcelona. He graduated from the Interactive Systems program at UPC University, Barcelona, and now lives and works in Madrid.

== Work ==
Using HTML programming, video, photography and digital or analogue drawing techniques, his work explores the boundaries between digital and physical world to show an increasingly diffusing field where technological progress is questioned as a reflection of the economical and social evolution. Enrique Radigales is an artist based in Madrid, Spain. He works with HTML programming, installations and drawing techniques to explore the border between the digital and the analogue worlds. By doing so, he creates an ever-increasing field that allows him to comment on the technological progress as a reflection of the social and financial evolution, and therefore the relationships between temporality and technology.

Enrique studied painting at Escola Massana in Barcelona and graduated from the Interactive Systems program at UPC University, Barcelona, in 1996.

His work has been shown individually in international museums and cultural centers, such as MIS (São Paulo), Instituto Cervantes (Bordeaux) or La Casa Encendida (Madrid), and has participated in several biennials as WRO 2011 (Wroclaw, Poland), Biennial IEEB4 (Sibiu, Romania) or Biennal Electrohype (Ystad, Sweden).

Radigales was an Eyebeam artist-in-residence in 2012.

== Exhibitions ==
=== Solo shows ===
- 2010 Contain the painting - Antonia Puyó Gallery. Zaragoza, Spain
- 2010 Dossier: Plug&Pray. Intervenciones - Casa Encendida, Madrid, Spain
- 2009 Wall Source - Formato Cómodo Galery, Madrid, Spain
- 2009 Enrique Radigales: idealword.org - MIS - Museu da Imagem e do Som, São Paulo
- 2009 Boombox - Cervantes Institute of Burdeos, Burdeos, France
- 2008 Ruina y paisaje - CDAN Center of Art and Nature, Beulas Foundation, Huesca, Spain
- 2007 Tecnología lenta - Antonia Puyó Galery, Zaragoza, Spain

=== Group shows ===
- 2011 14 Media Art Biennal WRO 2011 Alternative Now - Wroclaw, Poland
- 2011 Reproduction, repetition and Rebellion - Center for Graphic Art and Visual Researches AKADEMIJA, Belgrade. Servia
- 2011 Horizonte Vazado: artistas latinoamericanos en el filo - Cervantes Institute, Säo Paulo. Brazil
- 2010 Nulla dies sine linea - Freies Museum, Berlín. Germany
- 2010 Electrohype 2010 - Ystads Konstmuseum, Ystad
- 2010 Arsenal - Baró Galeria, São Paulo
- 2009 Video in Foco/Photo in Foco - Galeria Baró Cruz, São Paulo
- 2009 Secuencias - Galería Antonia Puyó, Saragossa
- 2008 Urban Jealousy - the 1st International Roaming Biennial of Tehran - International Roaming Biennial of Tehran, Tehran
- 2006 BCN Producció ’06 - Institut de Cultura de Barcelona, La Capella, Barcelona
- 2004 El 6to Salón Pirelli de Jóvenes Artistas Digitales - MACCSI Museo Arte Contemporáneo de Caracas Sofía Imber, Caracas
- 2001 Habitaciones - Galería Lausin & Blasco, Saragossa
