= Joan Brotat =

Spanish painter

Joan Brotat (1920–1990) was a painter born in Barcelona. He studied at the School of Arts and Trades of Barcelona and his work was first exhibited at one cycle of experimental art organised in 1950. Before his first exhibition, Brotat had a brief period of Informalism and experimentation with collages and gestual art. He also cultivated a post-modernist painting style with conventional themes, but in 1949 his work began to take on a personal primitivist as a reinvention of Romanesque Catalan painting. Brotat abandoned all experimental concern for new non-figurative forms of expression and became the painter of melancholy faces. The personal papers of Joan Brotat are preserved in the Biblioteca de Catalunya.
