= Jesús Peñarreal =

Spanish painter (1930–2908)

Jesús Peñarreal (1930 – 2008) was a Spanish watercolourist.

== Biography ==
Born in Burgos in 1930, he was given lessons according to the Burgos tradition, called the Burgos School.

After his marriage, he moved with his wife and his daughter and son to Benidorm at the Costa Blanca in Spain.

Several exhibits of his work took place over the years in the Caja Ahorras del Mediterraneo (CAM). Together with other artist-painters, his work was on permanent display in the largest gallery of Altea, as long as he could be in charge.

The Santa Maria Cathedral of Elche was one of his favourite subjects, but he excelled in a figurative style, painting large watercolours of fishing boats in the small harbours of Altea, Benidorm, Villajoyosa or Calpe, which he always signed with J.Peñarreal and soon became known as one of the country's watercolour painters.

The Dutch artist Hubertine Heijermans, who usually painted in that region when hibernating, lived in the same building, called "Acacias", in Benidorm. The two men frequently met and they would in particular discuss the "old masters" techniques, not only in watercolour, but also with oil paint. They did so from 1998 until Peñarreal died in Benidorm in 2008, after a long illness.
