= Manuel Chabrera =

Spanish painter

Manuel Chabrera Adiego
- Born: 1952 (age 73–74); Tarragona, Spain
- Known for: Painting, architecture, sculpture, architecture
- Movement: Action painting, crudismo
- Awards: Miembro de la Academia Europea de las Artes

Manuel Chabrera is a Spanish architect and artist, born in Tarragona in 1952 and raised in Andalucia.

As Sandra Miller, British art historian, said, “The subject matter of his compositions is the result of the violence of the physical act to which Chabrera commits himself; and although watching him paint may shock his observers, the results are compositions of great beauty.”

Action painting was the name originally coined by Harold Rosemberg to describe the work of artist Willhem de Kooning, and it is, perhaps, de Kooning who is referenced when describing the work of Chabrera. But Chabrera remains firmly figurative, albeit at a Gestalt level. Although there is a correspondence between abstract expressionism or action painting and the personal expressionism of Chabrera, there are also important and substantial differences. Instead of prioritising the act of painting over the final result, Chabrera inverts the process, prioritising once again the physical object over the concept or idea.

When the European Academy for the Arts, based in Leuze (Belgium), named Manuel Chabrera Adiego as a member, it did so in recognition of the singularity of this architect's work, where in the concept of a space, sculpture and painting are integrated with the playing with lights and volumes. His work has been displayed around the world for more than 30 years, appearing in cities such as: St. Petersburg, Mexico City, Montreal, Beijing, Shanghai, Guanzhou, Luxembourg, Helsinki, Stockholm, Oslo, Copenhagen, Munich, Düsseldorf, Berlin, Chicago, New York, Indianapolis, Buenos Aires, Geneva, Zurich, Bern, Miami and London. The presence and reach of his work is made evident by the numerous articles that have been written about him, as well as the many recognitions he has received over the years. The books “Inside his paintings: Manuel Chabrera” and “Manuel Chabrera” review the extensive career of this man who not only paints, but also does sculpture and prints. Manuel Chabrera has founded the Chabrera Foundation which is dedicated to promoting art to under privileged children and adolescents through the distribution of recycled computers, as well as promoting young artists through international exhibitions, and finally to foster and promote the work of Chabrera. Currently, the Foundation is experimenting with the distribution of Open Code software with the intention of allowing children and adolescents to express themselves creatively through new technologies as Creative Commons.

== Manuel Chabrera and the Crudismo movement ==
This artist is the founder of the "Crudismo" movement (in Spanish).

== "Arte Moderno y artistas del Flamenco" International exhibition ==
In 2010 Manuel Chabrera, accompanied by a series of plastic artists and from the world of flamenco, led the show "Modern Art and Flamenco Artists", an Itinerant exposition which incorporated on each city the work of their local artists.

Manuel Chabrera was accompanied among others by the following artists: Francisco Bella, Polisse, Tilen Zbona, Branislav Nikolić, Predrag Terzić, Milenko Aćimović, Kristina Pantelic, Gordana Nikolic, Aleksandar Dimitrijevic, Clara Von Aich, Angel Orensanz, among others.

This exposition was carried out in the following cities: Havana, New York, Ljubljana, Belgrade, Seville, Granada and Palermo.

The reason for this exhibition was to integrate different cultures and types of arts and encourage participation in all Spanish and local artists from each country visited. The exhibition was carried out within the framework of the Spanish presidency of the European Union during the year 2010.
