= Pep Duran =

Pep Duran (Vilanova i la Geltrú, 1955) is a Catalan sculptor, painter and designer who has participated in many theater productions and films since 1977. Duran obtained a Bachelor of scenery and costume for the college drama in Barcelona in 1979. The previous year had made his first exhibition in Barcelona, and since then his career as artist focused on the work of construction, representation and space, staging.

In 2011 Duran held the exhibition A Chain of Events at the Barcelona Museum of Contemporary Art in Barcelona, Spain.
