= Germán Álvarez Algeciras =

Spanish painter

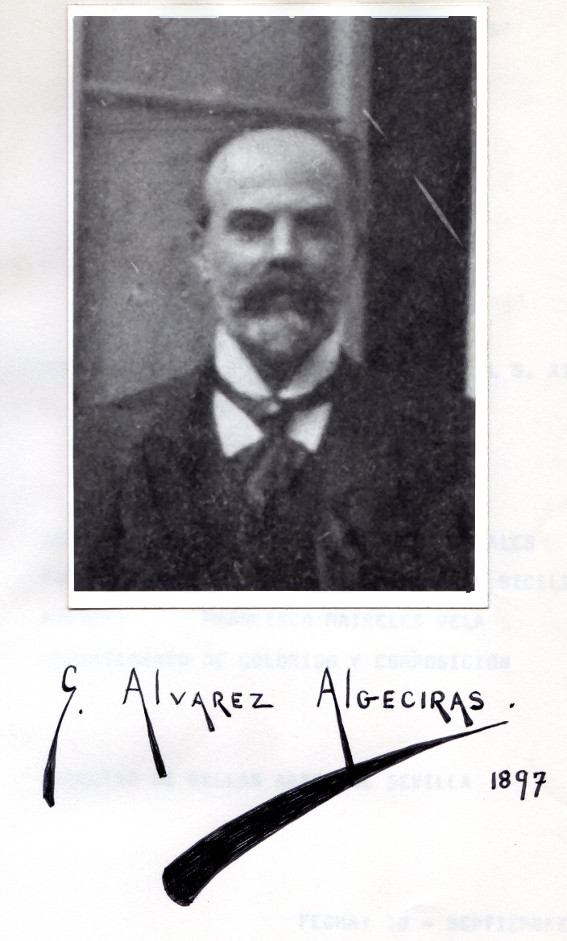
Autograph card

Germán Álvarez de Algeciras y Jiménez (1 February 1848 – c.1912) was a Spanish costumbrista painter.

== Biography ==
He was born in Jerez de la Frontera. He studied at the Academy of Fine Arts in Cádiz then, on a scholarship, at the Spanish Academy in Rome from 1871 to 1876 and also at the Academy Chigi in Rome. He came under the influence of Marià Fortuny. His first paintings were portraits of his relatives and still-lifes. He soon turned to genre scenes full of movement which reflected the work of other Spanish painters who had studied in Rome.

His first success came at the National Exhibition of Fine Arts in 1874, with his painting "Return to Golgotha". In 1877, several of his canvases won positive criticism at a showing in Seville. "The King's Jester" was purchased by King Alfonso XII and is now owned by the Patrimonio Nacional.

By 1879, he was teaching art in Jerez and, in 1885, became Director of the "Academy of Fine Arts of Santo Domingo", a local art school associated with the Catholic church. After retiring, he was named "Honorary Director". He also served as President of the fine arts department at the Ateneo de Jerez from 1897 to 1900. A street in Jerez was named after him.

He married his first cousin, Encarnación Álvarez, from Jimena de la Frontera, where her father (the youngest brother of Juan Álvarez Mendizábal) had established a medical practice. They had only two children, who both died young. He lived in Jimena for many years, and a large number of his works passed into the possession of his wife's family. She donated one of his paintings to the Church of San Dionisio (now a cultural monument), where it may still be seen hanging near the nave. He died in his home town of Jerez.

== Selected paintings ==
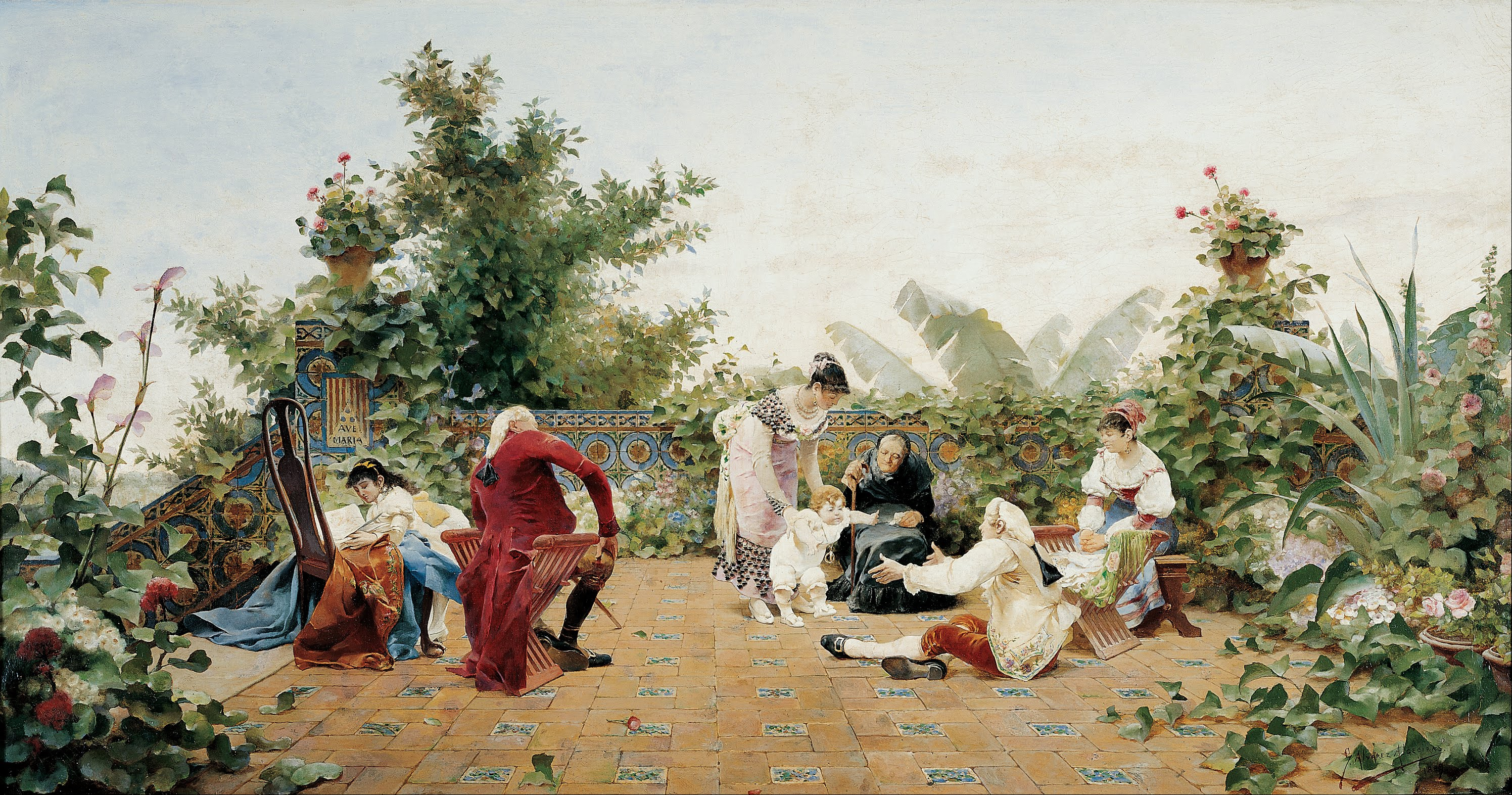
The First Step

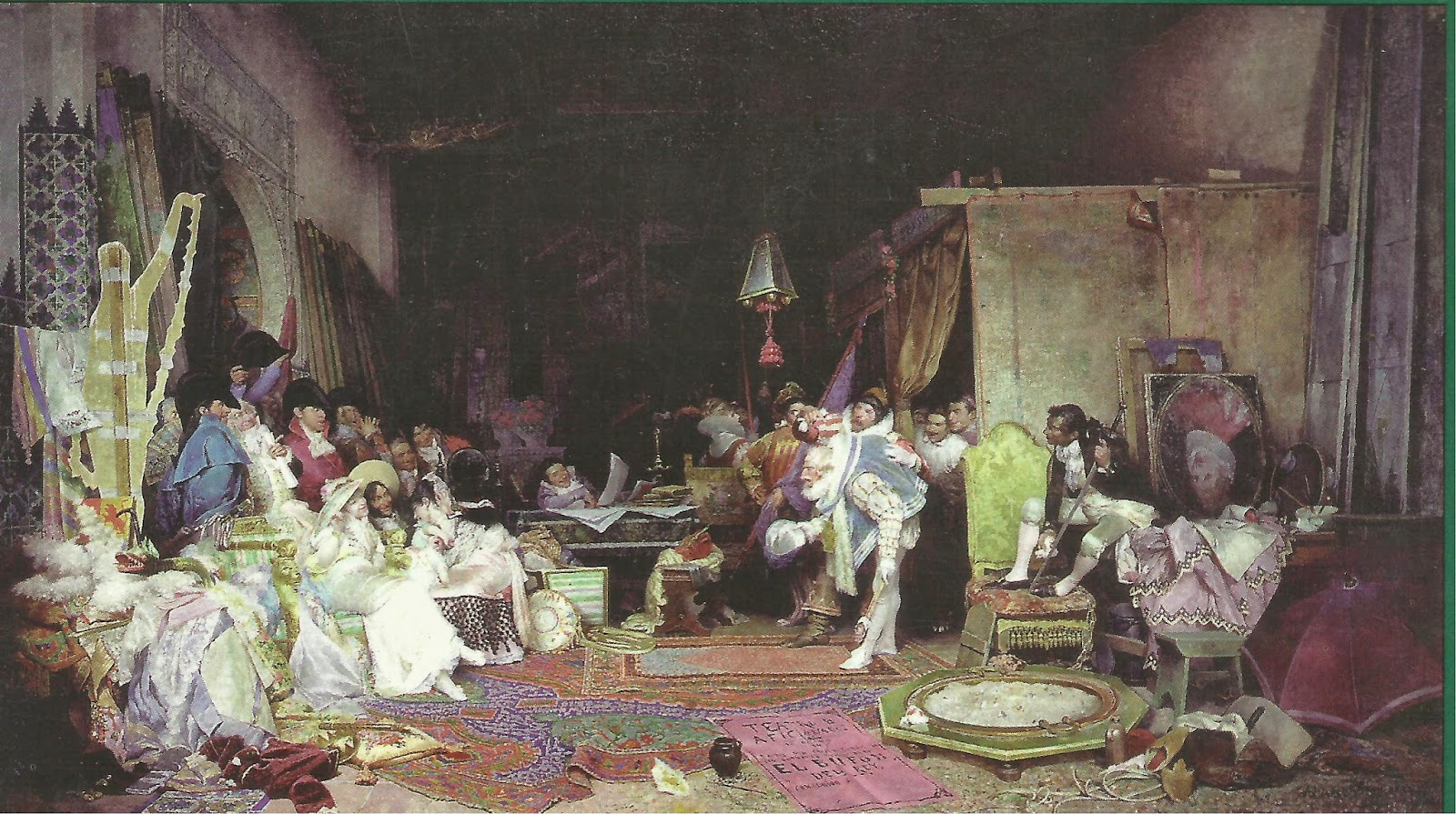
The King's Jester

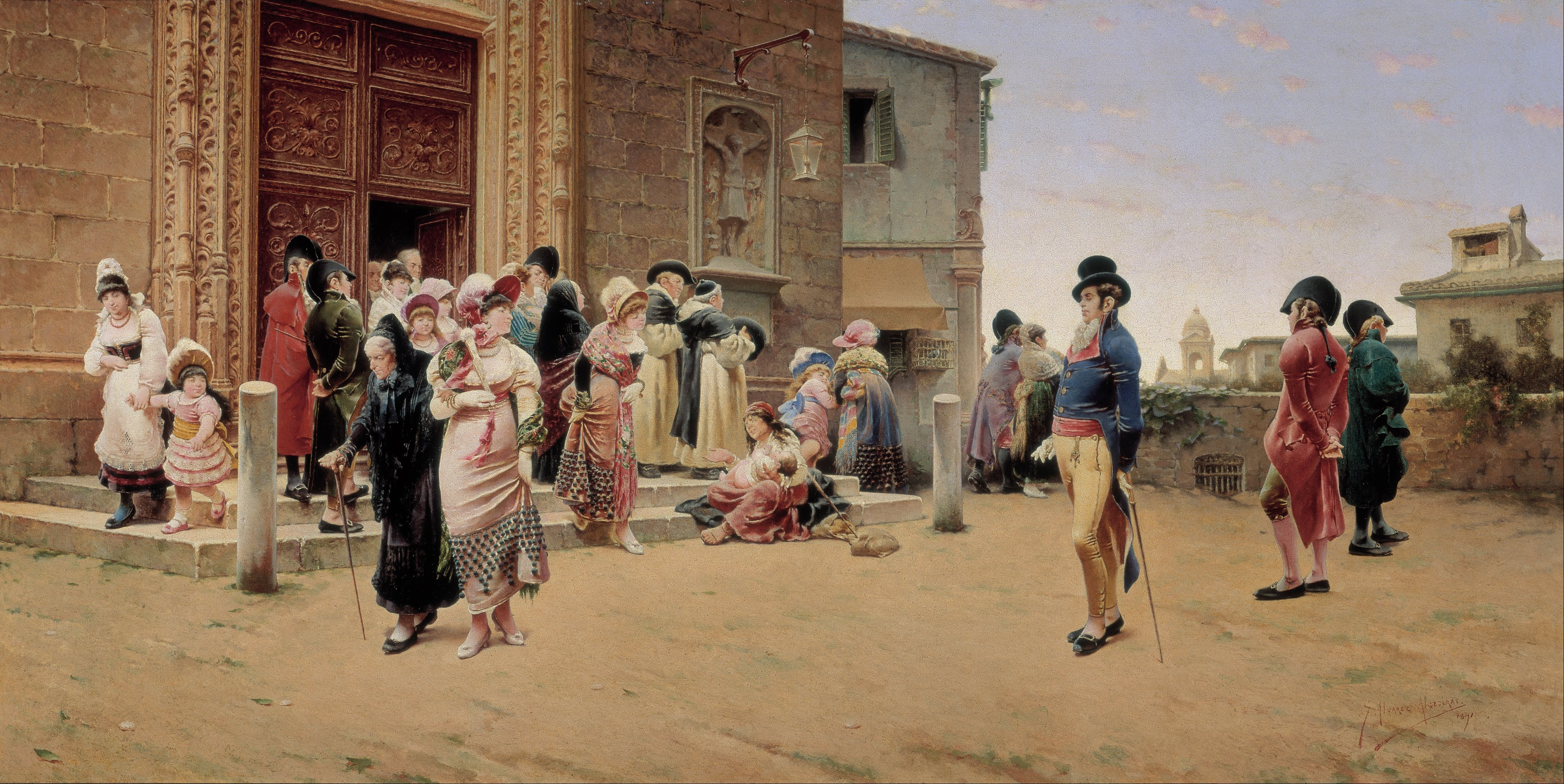
Leaving Church
