= Serrano Bou =

Spanish artist

- Born: Quim Serrano Bou; 10 May 1952; Blanes, Catalonia, Spain
- Known for: Painting, visual artist, spaces design, graphic design
- Awards: Art director of Foundation Angel Planells

Serrano Bou (born on 10 May 1952) is a Spanish painter and visual artist.

== Biography ==
Bou was born on 10 May 1952 in Blanes. During his youth he travelled extensively on the Asian continent and lived in New York City for over eight years during the 1980s. On 1990s he formed the social art group Public Projects with numerous urban and social art presentations. For over eight years he was the art director of an art foundation named after the Spanish surrealist painter Angel Planells, personal friend of Salvador Dalí, where many contemporary artists, local and international, showed new and outstanding art creations and plantations.

== Work ==
Besides his paintings, his art pieces include art installations, social and urban art presentations, paintings with metal oxidation, collages, sculptures and figurative pieces of social content with recycled plastics glued with silicon. Serrano Bou customizes each of his exhibitions, as he did in the summer of 2010 in a historic castle in Lake Garda, Italy. In 2005 he worked in Miami with Tony Goldman, of Goldman Properties, on the exhibition that marked his effort with the Museum of Contemporary Art in North Miami to turn the warehouse Wynwood, Miami, into the art district that it has been for several years.

== Exhibitions/Collectors ==
Besides his exhibitions and shows in Spain and abroad, Bou's work has been exhibited internationally in group and solo, including New York City, Mexico, Basel, Monaco, Italy, Dubai, Cadaques, among others. His work has been collected by private and public institutions including Goldman Properties, Prudential-Bache Securities, Contemporary Art Museum of Girona and CDAN Beulas Art Foundation.
