= José Nicolau Huguet =

Spanish painter (1855–1909)

- Born: José Nicolau y Huguet; 1855; Valencia, Spain
- Died: 15 February 1909 (aged 53–54); Gijón, Asturias, Spain
- Occupations: Painter, teacher
- Years active: 1879–1909
- Movement: Orientalism

José Nicolau Huguet (1855 – 15 February 1909) was a Spanish painter and teacher. He was known for his Orientalist paintings of figures, and portraits.

== Biography ==
José Nicolau Huguet was born in 1855, in Valencia, Spain. He attended classes at the Real Academia de Bellas Artes de San Carlos de Valencia, and studied under painter Joaquín Agrasot.

He showed his artwork in many salons in Spain, and won accolades. Nicolau Huguet taught at the academy in La Coruña. One of his students was the noted painter Carolina del Castillo Díaz.

He died on 15 February 1909, in Gijón, and was buried in the Cementerio de Ceares in Gijón.
