= Antonio Fillol Granell =

Spanish painter (1870–1930)

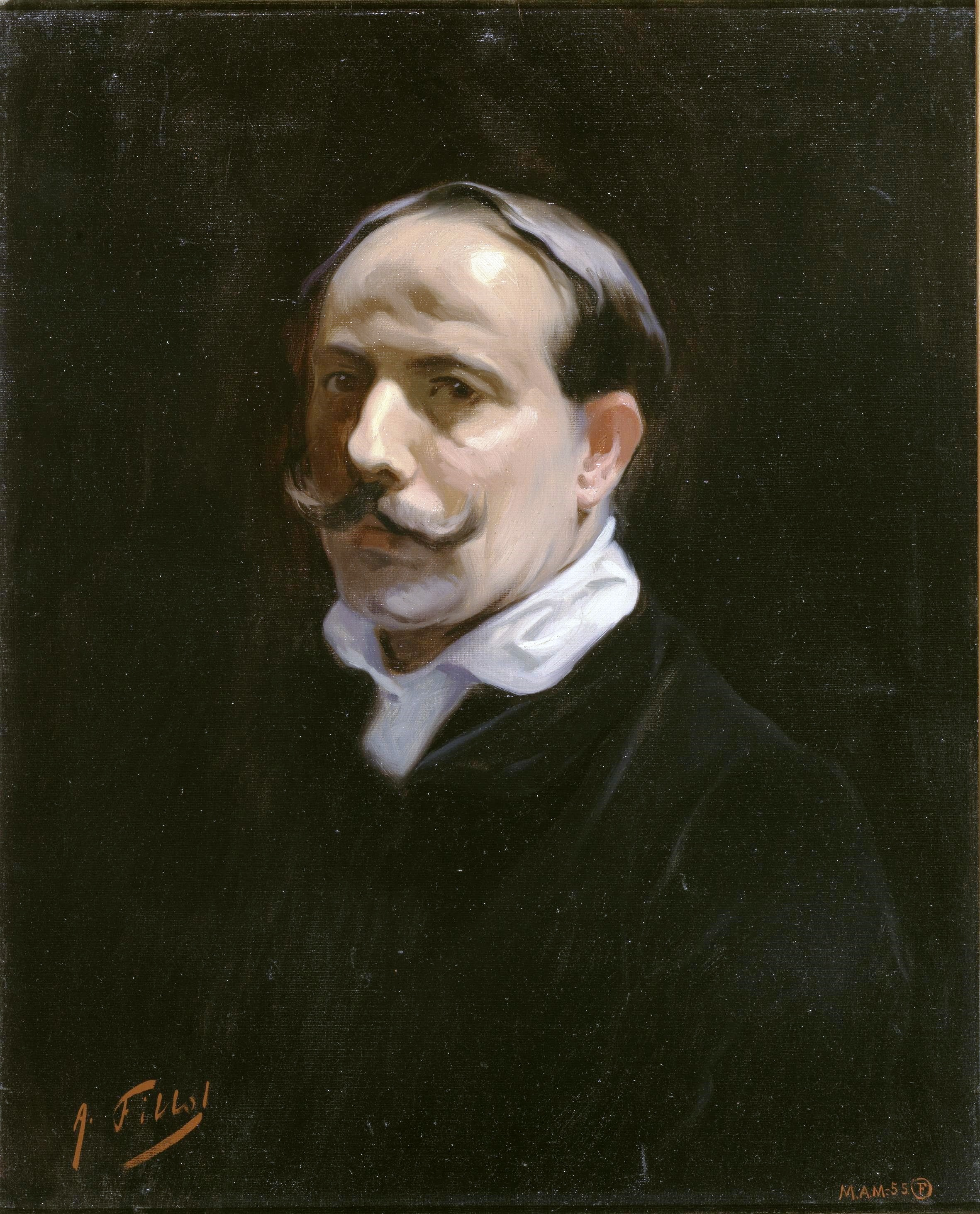
Self-portrait (c. 1915)

Antonio Fillol Granell (3 January 1870 – 15 August 1930) was a Spanish painter in the Social Realist style; known for his depictions of the people and customs of Valencia.

== Biography ==
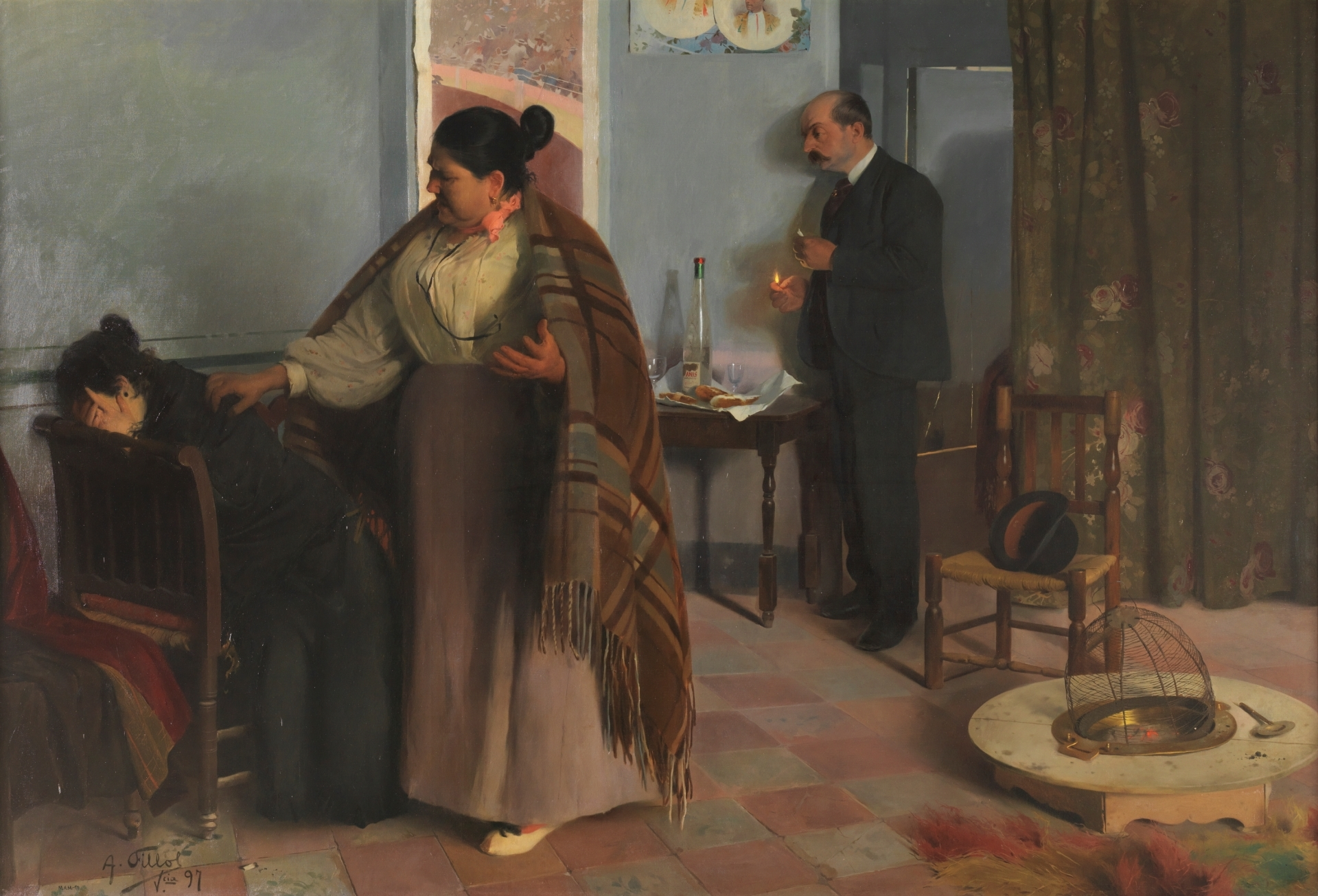
The Human Beast

He was born in Valencia. His father was the owner of a small shoe shop, where he worked when he was a boy, using his spare time to pursue his artistic interests. Eventually, his family reluctantly agreed to allow him to enroll at the Escuela de Bellas Artes de San Carlos, where he studied with Ignacio Camarlench and Vicente March, among others.

He had his first showing at the 1888 Barcelona Universal Exposition and won a prize of 500 Pesetas, which seems to have reconciled his family to his chosen career.

In 1895, his painting The Glory of the People won a Gold Medal at the National Exhibition of Fine Arts. At the exhibition of 1897, he presented The Human Beast, a scene depicting prostitution. It was severely criticized and he was branded "immoral", although many major cultural figures, such as Benito Pérez Galdós and Vicente Blasco Ibáñez came to his defense. A similar controversy followed his presentation of The Satyr in 1906.

In 1903, a grant from the Provincial Council enabled him to study in France and Italy. He later served as a Professor at San Carlos, where he promoted numerous educational reforms, and as President of the "Círculo de Bellas Artes de Valencia", a group which included Joaquin Sorolla and Julio Peris Brell. In that capacity he provided assistance to local artists and helped establish the "Regional Exposition of Fine Arts" in 1908. He was also an art critic for Blasco Ibáñez's journal, El Radical Diario Republicano. He died in Castellnovo, aged 60.

== Selected paintings ==
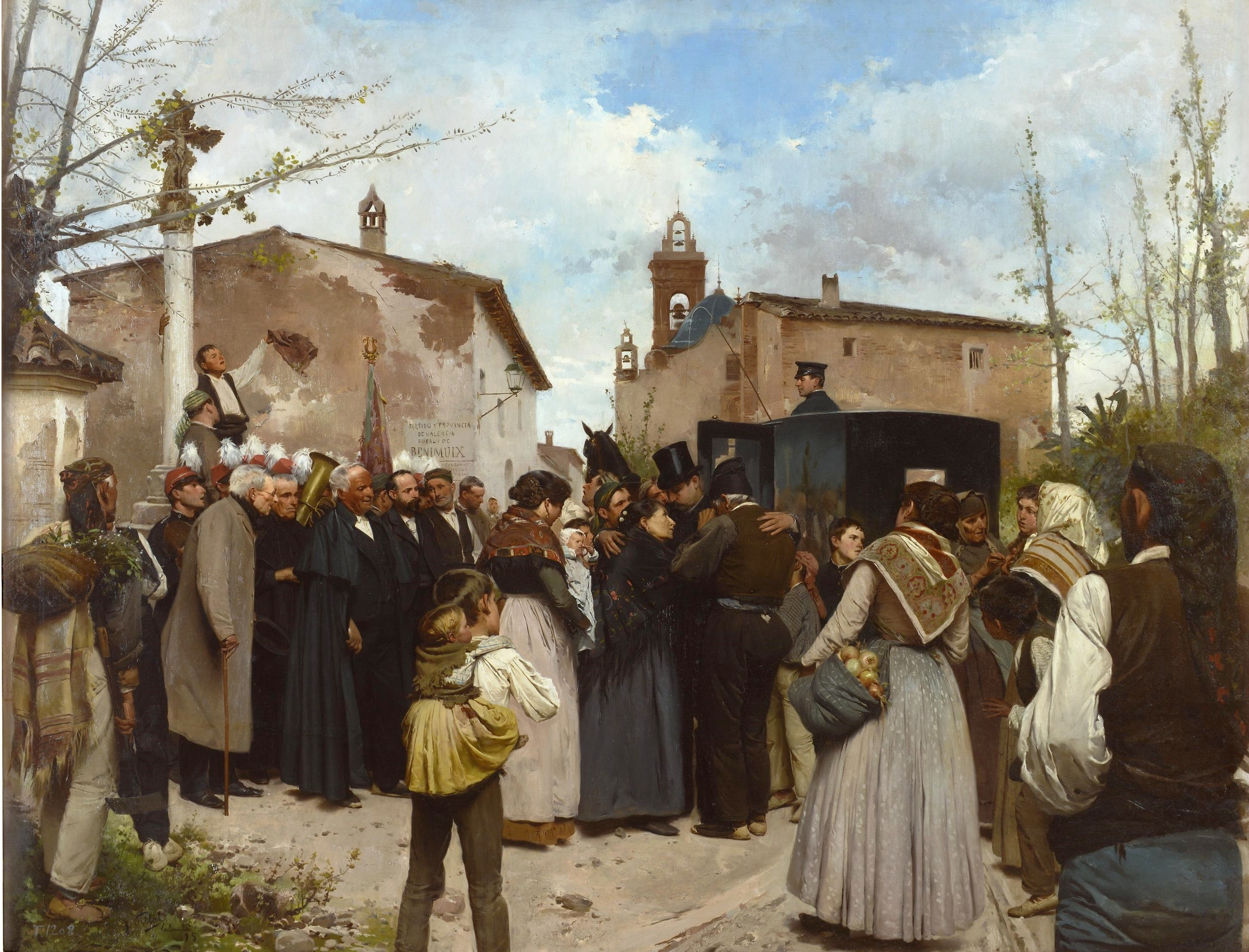
The Glory of the People (1895)

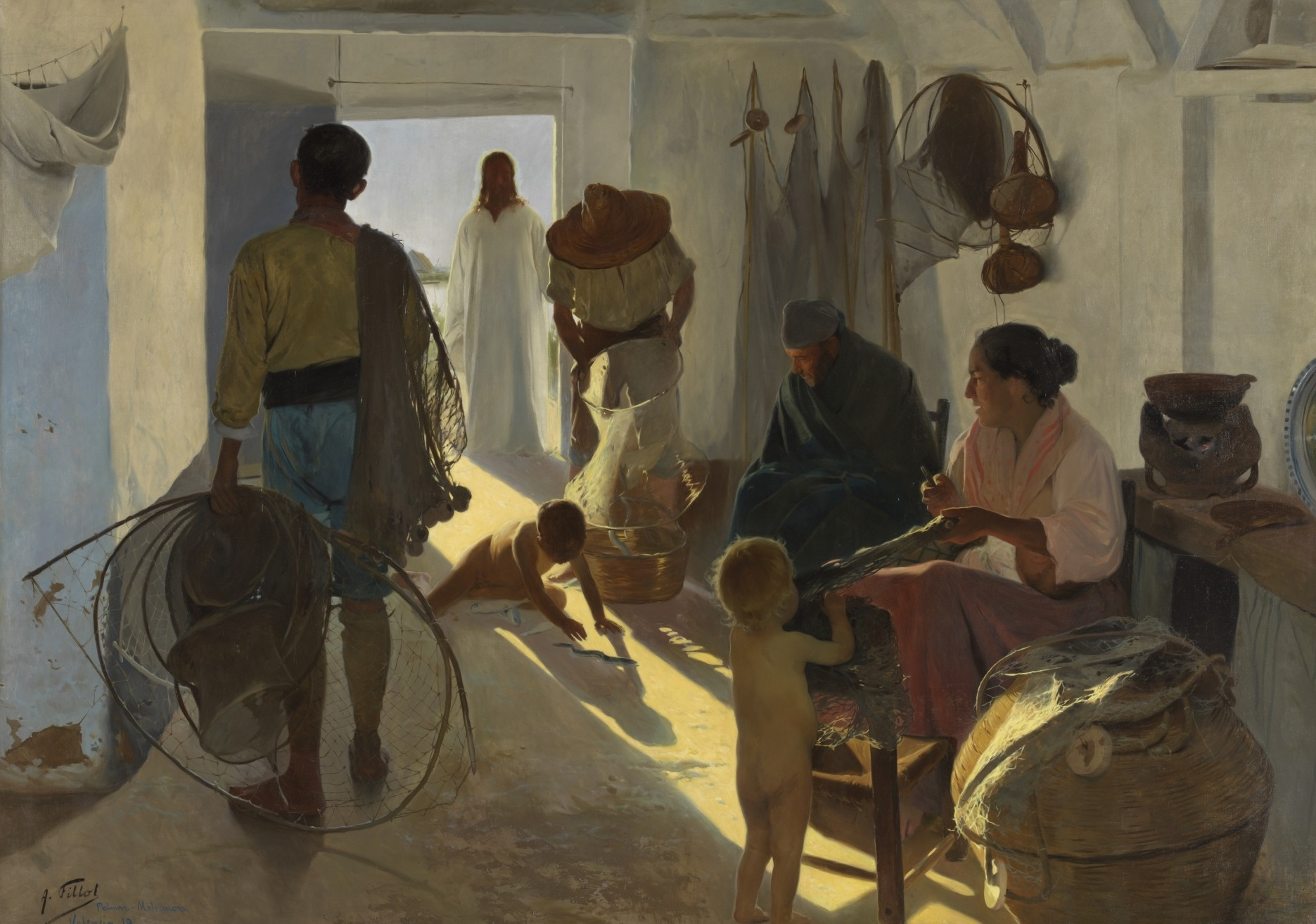
The Friends of Jesus (1900)

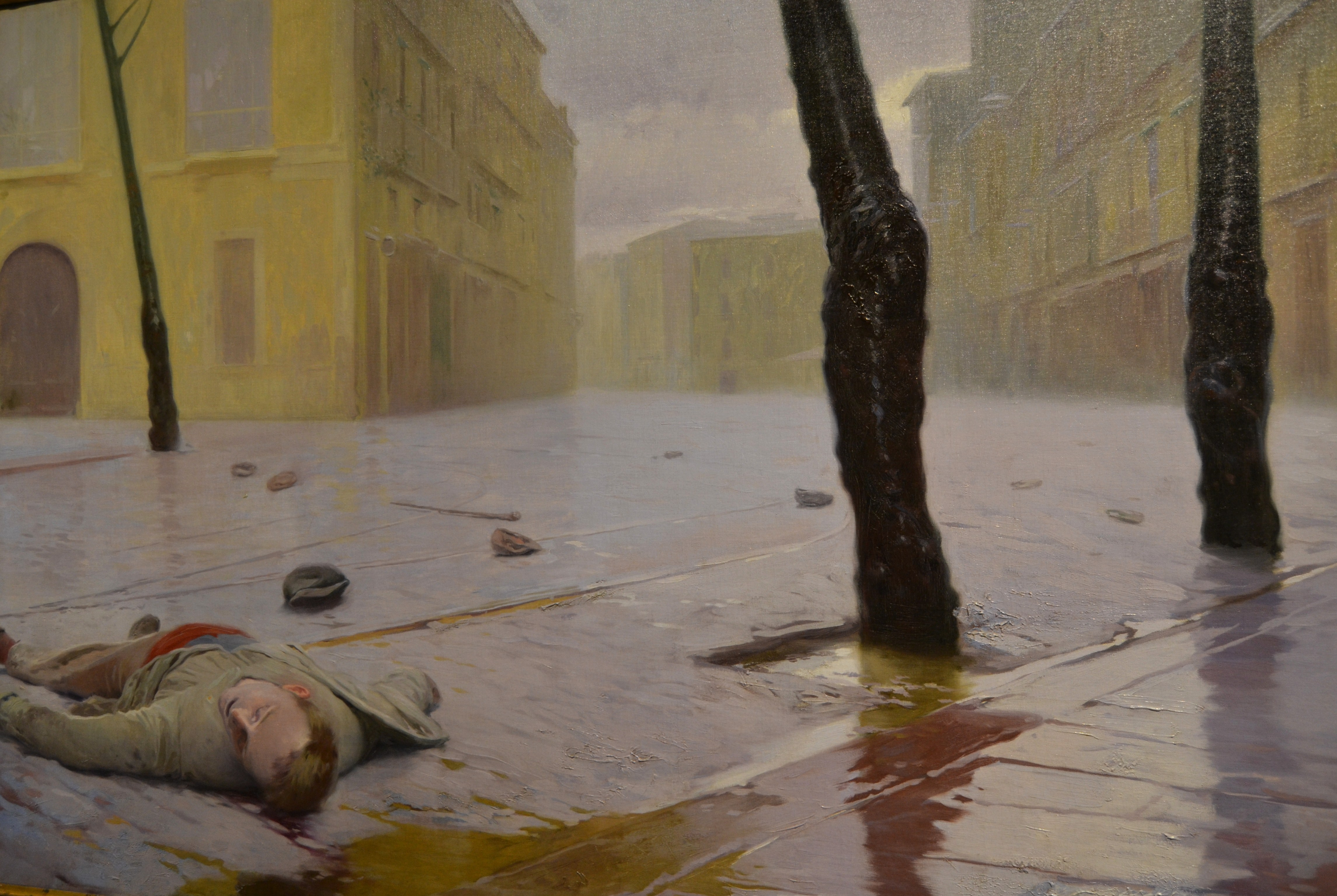
After the Battle (1904)

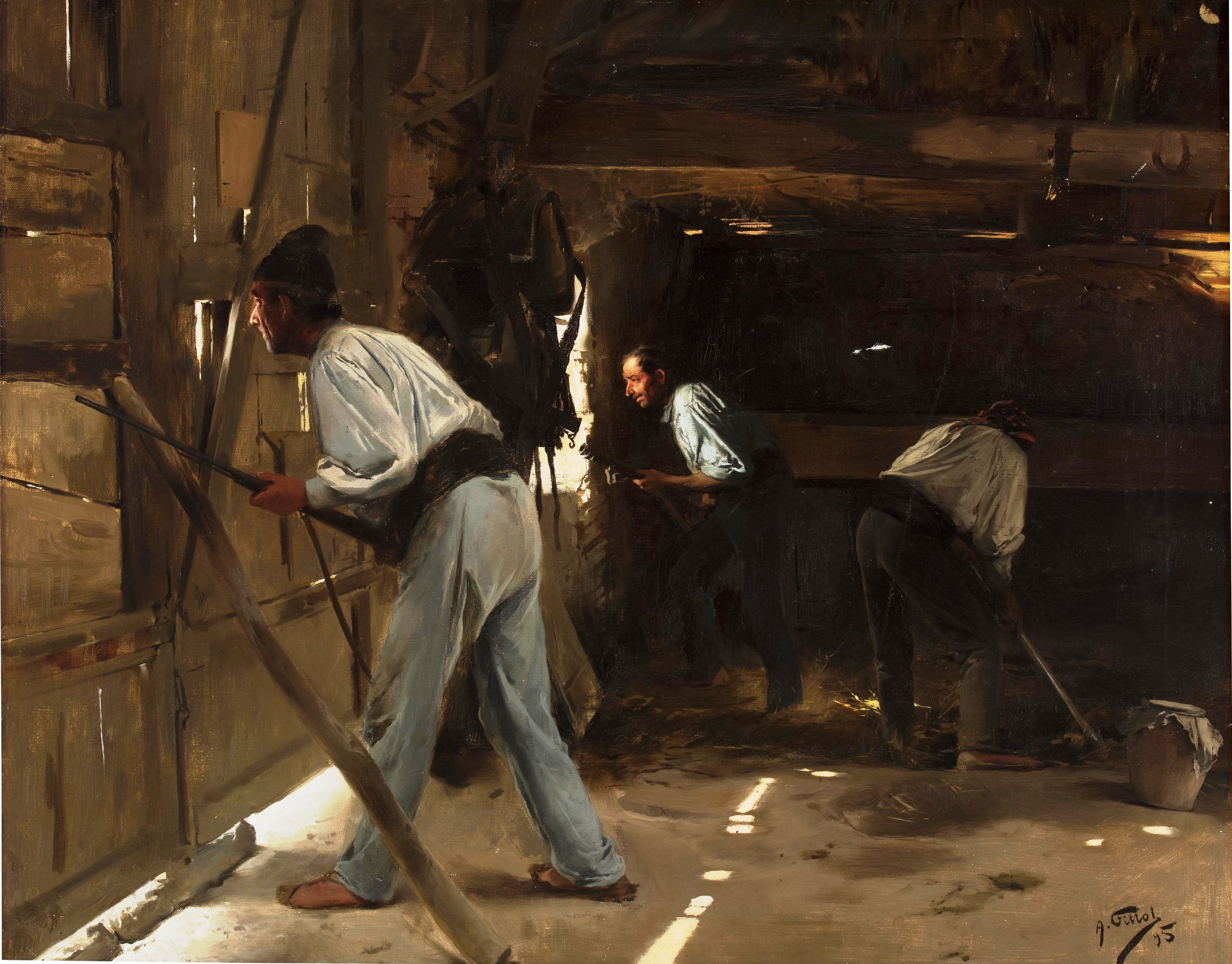
The Defense of the Hut (1895)
