= Francisco Albert =

Spanish realist painter and sculptor (born 1900)

Francisco Albert (1900 – death date unknown) was a Spanish realist painter and sculptor, originary from the town of Pinoso (Province of Alicante, Valencia, Spain). During the Spanish Civil War, he joined a number of Spanish artists and intellectuals who relocated to Mexico and incorporated into the artistic milieu there. He originally made a living by selling painting reproductions of famous classic paintings of painters like Velázquez, Goya and Titian.

The Mexican poet Carlos Pellicer wrote about his work, (see Pellicer's art texts compilations in Textos en prosa sobre arte y artistas (UNAM/INBA co-edition, 1997). One of his sculptures, "Ecstasy" (1946) is in the collection of the Smithsonian American Art Museum in Washington DC (1946.7.1). He was also active in the cities of Tampico and Guadalajara, where he made two sculpture commissions during the governorship of José de Jesús González Gallo (1947–1953), which included sculptures of Miguel Hidalgo and Cuauhtémoc, placed in the Plaza de la Liberación and in the park located in front of the Templo Expiatorio in Guadalajara, respectively, and later moved to the Parque El Dean and the Analco Neighborhood, respectively.
