= Mit Borrás =

Spanish artist

- Born: 1982 (age 43–44); Madrid, Spain
- Style: installation art video art

Mit Borrás (Madrid, 1982) is a Spanish visual artist based in Madrid and Berlin.

His work examines the relationship between human, nature and technology and their purpose of evolution. He has developed a work complex that encompasses visions of a post-human state of consciousness. Its center of focus is based on the interconnectivity between biodiversity and technological progress and the philosophical concept of adaptation as a method of surpassing categorial limits of existence. His work are essayistic portraits in the form of video-based works, performances and multi-dimensional installations, embody an augmented state of awareness.

The work of Mit Borrás has been exhibited at Centre Pompidou, Paris (2022), Art Dubai, UAE (2022), the Hara Museum, Tokyo (2010), Exgirlfriend Gallery, Berlin (2016–21), Tick Tack Gallery, Antwerp (2021), The Wrong Bienale, Paris (2021), Art Cologne (2021), Pylon Hub, Dresden (2021), Harddiskmuseum, Paris (2020), Arebyte Gallery, London (2019), Towards the Last Unicorn, Sau Paulo (2019), Dimora Artica, Milan (2018), Frontviews, Vienna (2019) Berlin (2018) and Athens (2018), Aleph Projects, Tel Aviv (2017), Biennial of Media Arts of Chile (2017), Palacio Fernandini and Art Lima, Lima (2016), Museo de Bellas Artes de Chile (2017), Kreuzberg Pavillon, Berlin (2013) and Norway (2016), Loop Barcelona (2010,15-19 ), Transmediale, Berlin (2011) among others.

He has directed the production of digital art festivals, carried out numerous projects as an independent curator, co-directed Fünf Galerie in Berlin (2010–14) and worked as coordinator of cultural projects at the Instituto Cervantes in Germany ( 2014).

Borrás collaborates as teacher of Ergonomy at TAI University, Digital Art, Video Art and Communication for the UC3 University at Circulo de Bellas Artes Escuela Sur, and Introduction to Digital Culture at Instituto Europeo de Diseño IED for the Master of Digital Fashion.

Is the founder and director of the studio CAVVE with Rachel Lamot as Creative Director and Head of Production. His work is represented in Spain by House of Chappaz gallery and is member of the art collective Frontviews and Haunt center in Berlin.

== Conferences ==
2024 Symbiosis with Machines. Canal Connect. Madrid, Spain

2023 Future Creatures. Windmill, Seoul, South Korea

2023 AI Love. Improper Walls. Vienna, Austria

2023 Tech Altars and Digilovers. TAI University. Madrid, Spain

2023 Future in the Evolution of Our Species. Canal Connect. Madrid, Spain

2023 Techno Altars. Cyborgs and Modern Monsters. Fjord. Madrid, Spain

2023 Digital Culture. Professor. Digital Fashio Master. IED. Madrid, Spain 2022 Future is an Animal. Instituto Europeo Di Design. Madrid, Spain

2022 Videoart. Professor. Escuela Sur. Madrid, Spain

2021 New Spaces for Digital Art. Fundación Telefónica. Madrid, Spain

2020 New Media and Communication in Art. Professor. Escuela Sur. Madrid, Spain

2020 Communication I. Master. Professor. Escuela Sur. Madrid, Spain

2019 New Media and Communication in Art. Professor. Escuela Sur. Madrid, Spain

2017 There is Nothing Like The Future. LetArt. Madrid, Spain

2017 Deer Shit. The Soft Slave Wonder. Validadero. Bogotá, Colombia

2017 Ergonomic Technology. Medialab-Prado. Madrid, Spain

2016 Proyector, Videoart Festival. Belmond Monaterio. Cusco, Perú

2016 Politics Poetics. ICPNA Cusco, Perú

2015 Teaching New Media Art and Creativity. Madrid, Spain

2015 Resist Restart. Vesselroom project. Berlín, Germany

2014 Structure of the idea. Forum. Berlín, Germany

2012 Didactics of contemporary art in youth. BAMF Schule. Berlín, Germany

2009 Experimenta club. La casa encendida. Madrid, Spain

2009 Art scene in Madrid. Documentary. Globe Trekker, International

2008 Process in media art. Apple store. London, England

== Press articles ==
=== English ===
Interview at Nasty magazine

Pylon Hub. Article. Heavven

Artviewer. Mit Borrás at Exgirlfriend

Swarmmag. Mit Borrás

Gallery Talk. Berlin Gallery Weekend Best Exhibitions

Kuba Paris. Heavven. Mit Borrás

Scandale Projects. Mit Borrás

Kuba Paris. Phantom Limb. Mit Borrás

Interview at Tique Art

Vvovva. Mit Borrás

Kaltblut

Pylon Hub. Adaptation Cloud. Mit Borrás

=== Spanish ===
Entrevista en Neo2. Heavven.

Entrevista en Metal Magazine

Phantom Limb. Entrevista en Neo2

Teen Wave en Neo2

Youth Cloud

Aleph Projects

Transmediale

Mmmad
