= Domingo Valdivieso =

Spanish painter

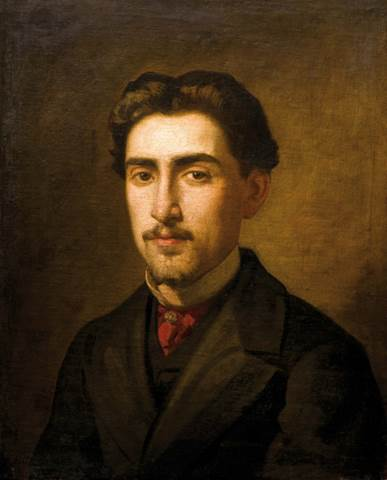
Presumed self-portrait (date unknown)

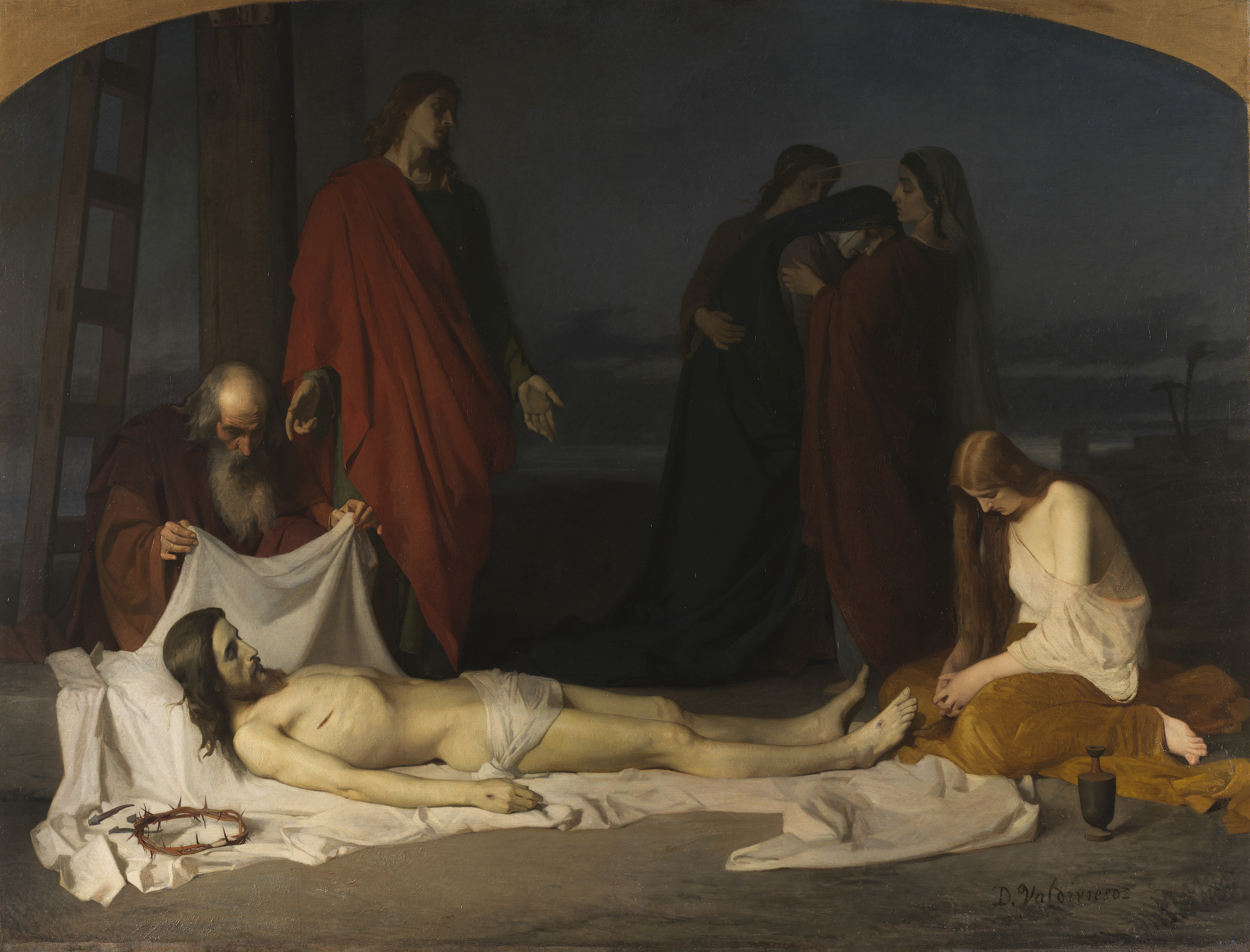
Descent from the Cross. The painter Eduardo Rosales served as the model for Christ.

Domingo Valdivieso y Henarejos (30 August 1830 – 22 November 1872) was a Spanish painter and engraver in the Academic style.

== Biography ==
Valdivieso was born in Mazarrón, where his father was an officer in the Spanish Army. He began his education in his home town, but later moved to Murcia to pursue his secondary studies. While there, he displayed a notable talent for drawing, so his counselors advised him to pursue artistic studies as well. His first teacher was a local artist named Juan Albacete. At eighteen, he moved to Madrid to work for the government, but also attended the Real Academia de Bellas Artes de San Fernando in his spare time.

By 1853, he had firmly decided on a career as a painter and quit his position. He also began to do lithography, providing illustrations for General Staff of the Spanish Army by Pedro Chamorro and History of the Royal Spanish Navy by José Ferrer de Couto and José March. In 1861, he received a grant from the Diputación de Murcia to complete his studies in Paris and Rome, where he came under the influence of Eduardo Rosales and the Nazarene movement.

From there, he participated in the National Exhibition of Fine Arts, winning medals in 1862, 1864 and 1866, the year he became a Professor of anatomical painting at the San Fernando Academy. In 1871, he was awarded another medal at the Exhibition.

His best-known works deal with religious subjects, although he also created historical scenes, portraits, mythological scenes and costumbrista works; depicting Italy and Murcia. The largest collection of his paintings is at the Museo de Bellas Artes de Murcia (MUBAM).

He died in Madrid, aged only forty-two, from a cerebral inflammation.
