= Patricia Dauder =

Spanish artist (born 1973)

- Born: 1973 (age 52–53); Barcelona
- Education: Ateliers Arnhem (1997-1998), Facultat de Belles Arts Sant Jordi, Universitat de Barcelona (1991-1996)
- Website: http://patriciadauder.net/contact/

Patricia Dauder (born 1973 in Barcelona) is a Spanish artist based in Barcelona.

== Exhibitions ==
- Lugares Comprometidos: Topografía y Actualidad, Fundación ICO, Madrid, Spain
- Los Tiempos de un Lugar, CDAN, Centro de Arte y Naturaleza, Huesca, Spain
- Horitzontal/Orbital, Fundació Suñol, Barcelona
- Teahupoo, ProjecteSD Gallery, Barcelona
- There is No(w) Romanticism, Galerie Les Filles du Calvaire, Brussels, Belgium
- Eté 2009, Galerie Jocelyn Wolff, Paris, France
- Patricia Dauder and Dani Gal, Galerie Kadel Willborn, Kalsruhe, Germany
- 1979: a monument to radical moments; La Virreina, Centre de la Imatge, Barcelona.
- Maqueta #1, Calendar #4, Finning; MACBA, Barcelona.
