= Rosa Maria Gilart Jiménez =

Spanish embroiderer (1810–1880)

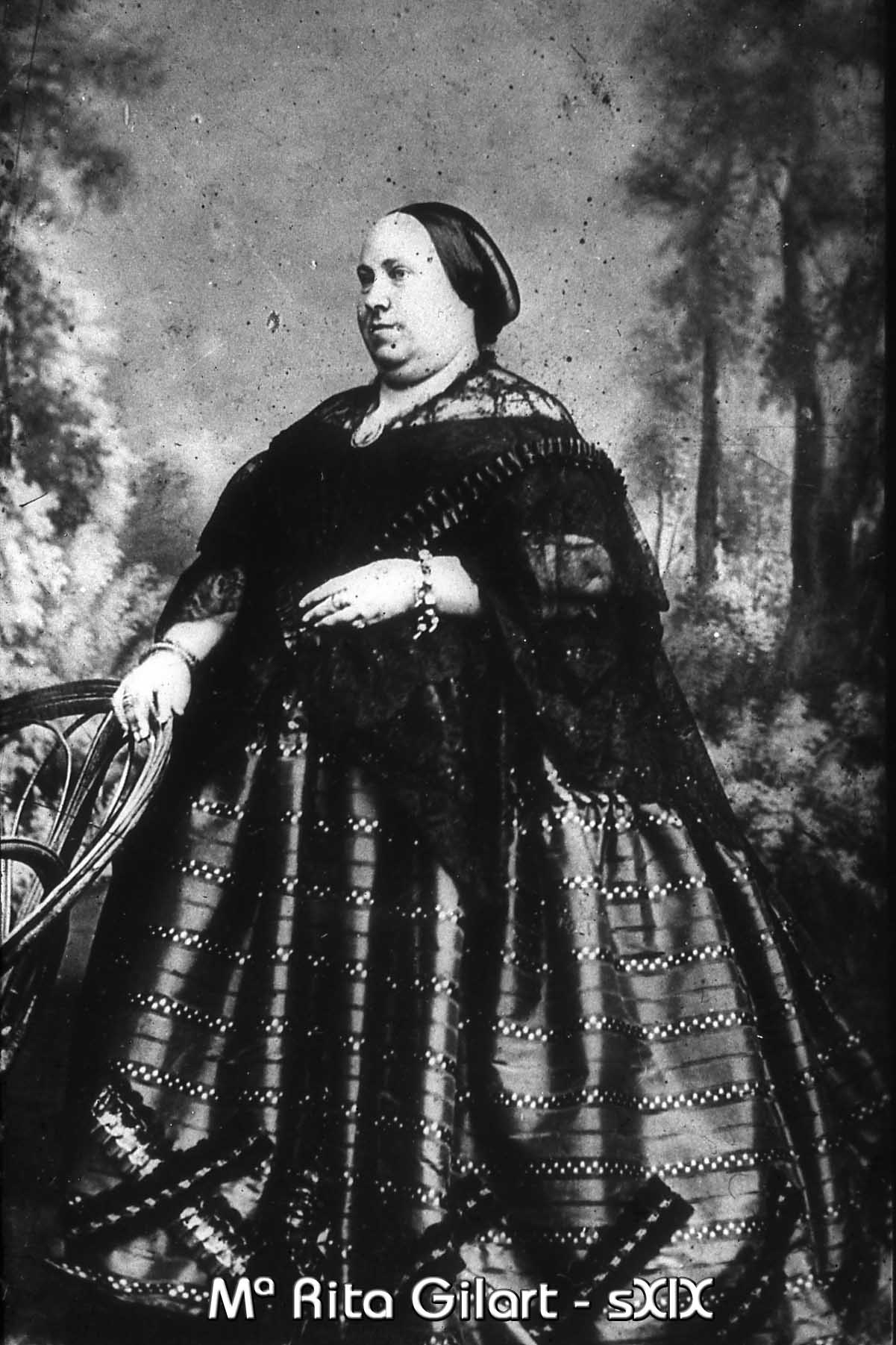
- (Cosme Bauçà Foundation Museum Collection. Felanitx, Mallorca)
- Born: 1810; Felanitx, Spain
- Died: February 1880 (aged 69–70); Madrid, Spain
- Occupations: Embroiderer, businesswoman
- Spouse: Pedro Juan Santandreu y Artigues
- Children: 1

Rosa Maria Gilart Jiménez (1810–1880) was a Spanish embroiderer who worked in the 19th century in the Royal Palace of Madrid, for the court of Her Majesty Queen Isabel II of Spain.

== Biography ==
Rosa Maria Gilart was one of at least five daughters born to Miquel Josep Gilart Antich and Magdalena Jiménez, in the town of Felanitx in the Balearic Islands of Spain. Rosa Maria was born in 1810.

When they were young, the sisters Rosa Maria and Magdalena Gilart moved to Palma to learn to draw and embroider in gold and silk with a barefoot Carmelite friar from the Principality. Later, Magdalena, Rosa Maria and three other sisters, Aina Maria, Rita and Margarida, settled in Madrid, where they gained fame for the quality of their embroidery and received orders from the state administration, specifically, the Court of Queen Isabel II of Spain. They had a workshop located in the Royal Palace of Madrid.

Of the sisters, Rosa Maria was the most successful in her embroidery career (especially with great help from Margarita and her other sisters) and was the owner of an embroidery establishment at number 17 Jacometrozo street in Madrid, at least since 1845. She held the position of the Queen's chamber embroiderer in gold, silver and silks in 1847, after having been chamber embroiderer of Infant Francisco de Paula Antonio de Borbón.

The Gilart sisters' production included dresses, tunics and other embroidered pieces that displayed devotional images and, which won them much acclaim such as in 1852 as described by Calamardo Murat;

"The delicacy of Rosa Gilart's work was awarded the silver medal of Section XIX and, judging by the press, earned the admiration and praise of Queen Victoria I of England. On 2 February 1852, at the presentation of the Infanta Isabel de Borbón 'la Chata' before Our Lady of Atocha, Isabel II wore for the first time a mantle of fire red velvet lined with ermine, made in the factory of Reus, with gold embroidery in the center, made by the Gilart sisters, consisting of a 'splash of castles, lions and fleurs-de-lis,' and around a 'garnish of a precious Gothic drawing, which was chosen by Her Majesty..."

=== Personal life ===
A fellow countryman and artist from Mallorca, court sculptor Pedro Juan Santandreu y Artigues (1808–1838), visited Rosa's embroidery shop in Madrid and admired the sisters' "uncommon ability and kind and frank treatment". He married Rosa Maria but soon he became ill with a "a slow fever" and was told by doctors that he had to return to his island homeland to recover his health. He made the trip accompanied by Rosa's sister Ana María, but on 26 November 1838, just one month after his arrival on the island, he died. Rosa Maria became a widow at 28 and a single mother of one daughter, Matilde Santandreu y Gilart, who, many years later, became the Marquise of Villalbos after her marriage to Manuel López de Sagredo y Escolano.

Rosa Maria Gilart died in Madrid in February 1880.
