= Alicia Martín Villanueva =

Spanish sculptor

Alicia Martín
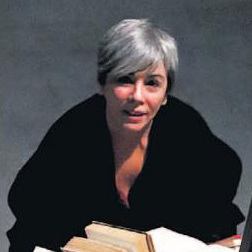
- Born: 24 June 1964 (age 61); Madrid
- Known for: sculptures made from books

Alicia Martín Villanueva (born 24 June 1964) is a Spanish sculptor. At the beginning of the 90s, she began to work with books, which has become her hallmark.

== Life ==
Martín was born in 1964 in Madrid. She has a degree in fine art.

She has had an exhibition at the Ginkgo gallery in her home city. In 2004 she had an exhibition titled Projections of autism in Thiers in France from October to December 2004.

Her first sculpture of books was at the Casa de America in Madrid and the second was in Córdoba. This second sculpture was created in two parts and it took a team of eight people to construct it in place over 48 hours. It was essentially made from 5,000 donated books and was 5.5 metres high. The books appear to spout out of a window of the Molino de San Antonio as if they might fill the River Guadalquivir with their words.

In June and July 2018 she had an exhibition in Madrid at the Lucía Mendoza Gallery. It was a fringe event to the Festival of PHotoEspaña 2018.

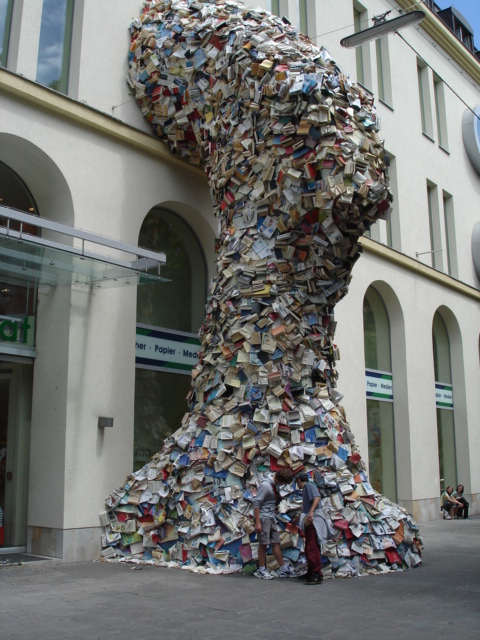
Martin's sculpture in Linz in Austria

In 2019 she received the Antonio de Sancha Award which is given annually since 1997 for "the promotion and defense of cultural values". It is an award by the Madrid Publishers Association.

In 2003 her work was included in the Centro Museo de Arte Contemporáneo de Castilla y León Musac's collection. The installation in wood and books shows a pile of books invading the space in a room by pushing aside on wall. The gallery thought one of the "distubing" aspects of the work was that it appeared to stop time.

Her work is in some museums and collections of Contemporary Art including the Museo Nacional Centro de Arte Reina Sofía, Centro Museo de Arte Contemporáneo de Castilla y León Musac, DA2, Biblioteca de Alejandría (Egypt), MAS, Galician Center for Modern Art, CGAC, Patio Herreriano Museum, Museum of Contemporary Spanish Art, (Valladolid), Basque Center Museum of Contemporary Art in Vitoria, Valencian Institute of Modern Art, Caldic Collectie BV, (Rotterdam), Museum Voorlinden in The Hague.
