= Paquita Sabrafen =

Spanish painter (1931–2009)

- Born: 23 August 1931; Barcelona, Spain
- Died: 22 January 2009 (aged 77); Sydney, Australia
- Occupation: Artist -Painter
- Known for: Paintings
- Spouse: Joaquin Hernandez Ruiz de Haro
- Parents: Alfredo Sabrafen Gimenez (father); Francisca Olle Puig (mother)
- Website: http://www.sabrafen.net/

Paquita Sabrafen (23 August 1931 – 22 January 2009) was a Spanish painter who specialised in portraits.

== Early life ==
Paquita, growing up in the time of the Spanish Civil War has had a rough childhood and was struck by tragedy early in life as her mother died when she was just 5 years old.

Due to the circumstances of her time, she fled from her home in Barcelona to France and then to Buenos Aires, Argentina as World War 2 began and Nazi Germany was rapidly advancing in Europe. In Buenos Aires, the young child discovered her passion for art and took art lessons from established artists Andrea Morch, Vincent Puig, Moises Guinart, Huget and Viladrich.

Paquita first solo exhibition was held in Argentina in 1950. Her exhibits had in short time become a constant encounter in the "Galeria Muller" held in the Alvear Palace in Buenos Aires and "Galerie Renon" held in Rosario, Argentina. Due to her extensive work she became one of the preferred portrait painters of the elite society in Buenos Aires, portraits which she combined with landscapes and still life.

== Famous works ==
Among her latest works are the painting titled “Torn by War” inspired by Eric Campbell, ABC Foreign Correspondent. This painting expresses the personal tragedy of Eric Campbell and the loss of his cameraman, Paul Moran who was the first Australian to die in the Iraq War. It is a historic painting marking the beginning of the war in Iraq with global significance.

Another famous work is the portrait of Masako Ide, who in October 2004, was personally awarded a medal from the Emperor of Japan for her service to her country in the area of public health, the painting was completed March, 2005. She has also painted members of the Fijian Royal Family and noted politicians.

Over the last decades she has divided her time between Australia and Spain. She has travelled extensively throughout the world. Most of her paintings are made in her studio in the village of La Mancha, in an atmosphere of peace and tranquility.

In La Mancha she lived with her husband Joaquin in an historic 300 year old Spanish mansion, which she restored to its former glory. The mansion is situated in a mountainous region, looking out over mountains and a river flowing beneath. The restored La Mancha Villa served as a home, studio and Gallery/Museum where tourists can see the works of Paquita Sabrafen.

== Death ==
Sabrafen died in Sydney, Australia on 22 January 2009, at the age of 77.

== Galleries ==
Sabrafen's paintings are in the collections of numerous prestigious National Art Museums worldwide:

- The Hermitage Museum, St Petersburg, Russia. Two oils, entitled ‘Frances’ and ‘ La Lidia’.
- The National Museum of Czechoslovakia in Prague, ‘Pancho’.
- Nagasaki Museum, Japan. ‘Muzumezo’, a Plea for Peace.
- The Provincial Museum of Albacete, Spain, ‘Manchega ’.
- Art Gallery of NSW, Sydney, Australia, ‘Australian Wild Flowers’.
- The National Art Museum of China, ‘Light in the Darkness’ and ‘Fruits of the Harvest’ (2005).

Other Sabrafen canvas are found in the Atomic Bomb Museum, the 26 Martyrs Museum and Nagasaki Town Hall. Her canvas ‘Woman looking at her own reflection in the lake’ was selected to occupy a prime place in the Tokyo Metropolitan Art Museum (Nika exhibition 1993).

Some of Paquita Sabrafen largest oil on canvas painting are also found in churches, most notably "Nuestra Señora de Orito" found in the Sanctuary of Capuchins in Alicante, where approximately 200,000 people pilgrim each year and it is said that her paintings have inspired much devotion. Others paintings are found are in the church of Carmelitesin in the village of Lietor (Albacete, Castilla la Mancha). Sabrafen's painting of “Cruz Ortiz Real” inspired from the nun declared a Saint by the Pope on 21 March 2004 hangs inside the church of Salessianas in Alicante, Spain.
