= Ana Pérez Ventura =

Spanish visual artist and pianist

- Born: November 5, 1981 (age 44); Santiago de Compostela, Spain
- Occupations: Visual artist Pianist
- Website: anaperezventura.com

Ana Pérez Ventura is a Spanish-French visual artist and pianist based in Paris.

== Education ==
Pérez Ventura studied fine arts at the University of Vigo in Spain, where she completed her degree in painting (1999–2004). She later trained in music at the Conservatory of Vigo, earning a degree in piano (2003–2008). She went on to complete a master’s degree in music with a focus on music and visual arts at Sorbonne University in Paris between 2009 and 2011.

== Career ==
=== Art ===
Her artistic practice is closely connected to her parallel career in music, as she is both a visual artist and a pianist. Her work establishes original correspondences between art and music, while exploring the relationships between time, space, and the concept of repetition. Since 2007, Pérez Ventura has been working on a long series entitled Études, which references musical studies. In 2010, works from this series were presented in a solo exhibition at the Colegio de España, Cité Internationale Universitaire de Paris, in Paris, France. In 2012, She presented her second exhibition Le temps comme espace at the Sorbonne University, featuring twenty works from her Études series. Her painting Étude n.º 187, received the Artension Prize in Paris, in 2014. The acrylic on canvas was displayed at the Salon des Réalités Nouvelles.

In 2025, Pérez Ventura was featured by Art Madrid among the 20 Women Artists You Need to Know at Art Madrid’25.

=== Music ===
Alongside her visual art practice, Pérez Ventura has pursued a career as a pianist. She has participated in performance cycles such as the “Teresa Berganza” concert series, Festival “Xeración 2000+8” (Vigo, Spain). Pérez Ventura performs with the Spanish pianist Ángel Álvarez. In 2012, they established the piano duo Catalicia in Paris. The four-hand piano duo performs regularly in France and Spain.

== Exhibitions ==
=== Solo ===
- 2012: Le temps comme espace, Research Center of the Sorbonne University, Paris, France
- 2013: Une écriture du temps, Galerie Point Doré, Paris, France
- 2013: Espace et répétition, Maison des Étudiants Suédois, Cité internationale universitaire de Paris, Paris, France
- 2014: Vibrations, Galerie Artemper, Paris, France
- 2017: La Mesure du Temps, H Gallery, Paris, France
- 2019: Études, Galería Metro, Santiago de Compostela, Spain
- 2020: Cuestión de tempo, Pazo Torrado, Cambados, Spain
- 2022: Tourner la page, Galería Metro, Santiago de Compostela, Spain
- 2022: Sincronía. Tempo e xesto. Ana Pérez Ventura – Gonzalo Sellés Lenard, Museo do Mar de Galicia, Vigo, Spain
- 2023: Medindo o xesto. Trazando o tempo. Ana Pérez Ventura – Gonzalo Sellés Lenard, Centro Cultural Marcos Valcárcel, Ourense, Spain
- 2024: ONE, Maus Contemporary, Birmingham, Alabama, USA

=== Group ===
- 2015: NordArt 2013, Kunstwerk Carlshütte, Büdelsdor, Germany
- 2018: 365 Artists 365 Days Project: The Show, The Frank Juarez Gallery, Milwaukee, Wisconsin, USA
- 2022: Cruzamentos na arte galega da Colección CGAC, CGAC, Santiago de Compostela, Spain
- 2023: RN Paris Kyoto, Kyoto International Community House, Kyoto, Japan
- 2024: Intention Non-Intention III, Wu Dengyi Art Museum, Taipei, Taiwan
- 2025: Correspondencias: José María de Labra, Centro Obra Social ABANCA, Santiago de Compostela, Spain
- 2026: Line / Space, Maus Contemporary, Birmingham, Alabama, USA

== Public collections ==
- Birmingham Museum of Art
- Wiregrass Museum of Art
- Paul R. Jones Museum of American Art, University of Alabama

== Grants and awards ==
- 2023: Salon des Réalités Nouvelles, Prix Fondation Taylor, France
- 2014: Salon des Réalités Nouvelles, Prix Artension, France
- 2010-2012: Pedro Barrié de la Maza Foundation, grant, Spain
- 2009-2010: Segundo Gil Dávila Foundation, grant, Spain
