= Camil Bofill =

Spanish Catalan painter and sculptor

- Born: 1957 (age 68–69); Torelló, Spain

Camil Bofill (1957, Torelló) is a Catalan painter and sculptor. At 20 he began studies at the Faculty of Fine Arts in Barcelona in order to gain a more solid foundation to continue on the way of painting, which has already decided to fully work. Attend both classes of sculptor Rosa Martínez Brau gaining greater mastery of drawing, volume and form.

He graduated in 1981. In the same year he painted the altarpiece of the main altar of Santa Maria de Borredà. This facet of his paintings, which find a previous work in 1979, making 1988 resumes in the altarpiece of the church baptistery Torelló.

In 1988 he presents his paintings for the first time in Barcelona. Then he exposed in this city and also in Madrid, Girona, Bilbao and Braga (Portugal). Exhibitions mostly individual and some collective.
