= Juan José Gárate =

Spanish painter (1869–1939)

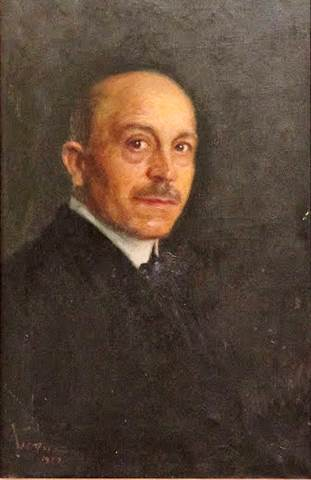
Self-portrait (1922)

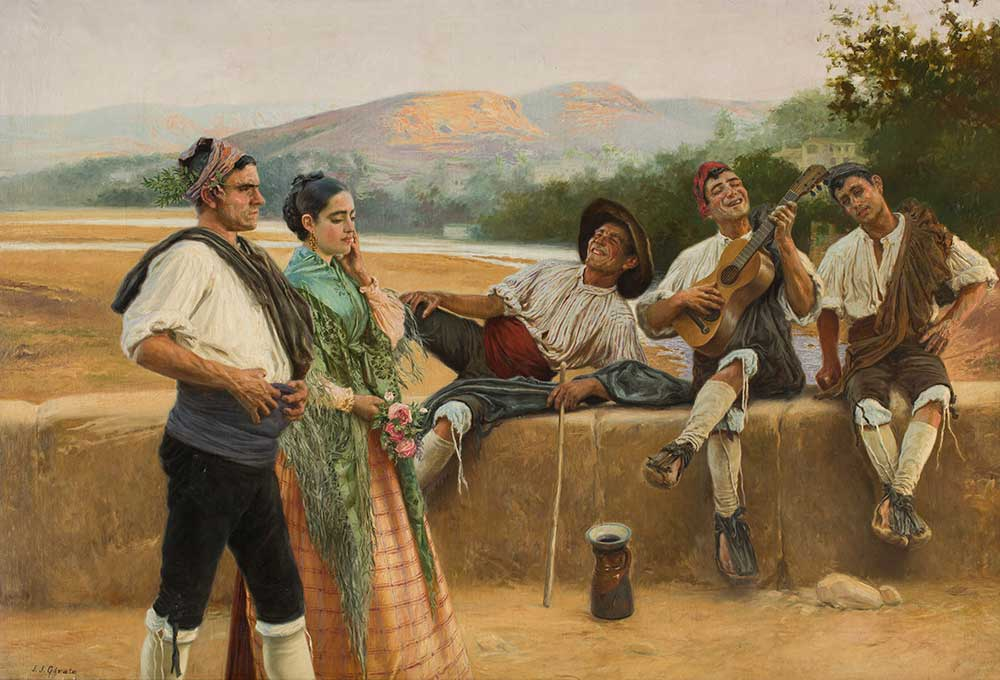
The Allusive Couplet (1904)

Juan José Gárate y Clavero (11 July 1869 – 3 July 1939) was a Spanish painter known for his portraits, landscapes and costumbrista scenes of Aragonese life.

== Biography ==
He was born in Albalate del Arzobispo. When he was still a boy, he enrolled at the School of Fine Arts in Zaragoza and, at the age of only twelve, made a portrait drawing of King Alfonso XII when he came to inaugurate the Canfranc railway project.

In 1884, the Ayuntamiento de Zaragoza and the Diputación de Teruel, came together and granted him an annual stipend of 450 Pesetas, which enabled him to attend the Real Academia de Bellas Artes de San Fernando in Madrid. Two years later, the Diputación de Teruel examined his work and granted him 4,000 Pesetas annually for four years so he could complete his studies.

Upon doing so, he requested two more years of support so he could attend the Spanish Academy in Rome. His request was granted upon presentation of his painting "The Death of Diego Marcilla"; a scene from the Lovers of Teruel. He began his studies there immediately, with Francisco Pradilla Ortiz as his primary instructor.

After 1895, his works became internationally recognized. He won several medals at the various exhibitions, including the Exposition Universelle of 1900 in Paris. He was also awarded the "Gran diploma de Honor" at the Hispano-French Exposition of 1908 and a Gold Medal at the National Exhibition of Panama in 1916. King Alfonso XIII purchased his painting, "The Allusive Couplet", which had won second place at the National Exhibition of Fine Arts in 1904.

In 1897, the Diputación de Zaragoza named him Professor of Coloring and Composition at the Academy and, in 1909, he was confirmed as an interim Professor of Art History and Decorative Arts at the "Escuela Superior de Artes e Industrias". He began a series of travels in 1911, visiting France and returning to Italy. He finally settled in Madrid, where he continued to exhibit regularly. He died there, aged 69, after being run over by a streetcar.
