= Vicente March =

Spanish painter

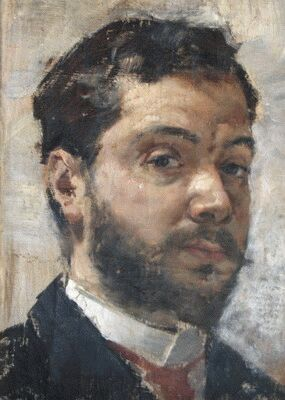
Self-portrait (date unknown)

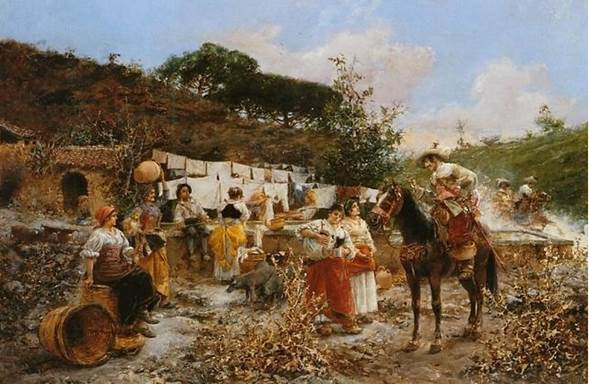
The Washerwomen

Vicente March y Marco (27 December 1859, Valencia - 31 March 1927, Benigànim) was a Spanish costumbrista painter; known primarily for portraits and landscapes. He was also an amateur photographer. Most sources indicate that he died sometime in 1914.

== Biography ==
He received his artistic education at the Escuela de Bellas Artes de San Carlos, where he studied with Gonzalo Salvá and Francisco Domingo Marqués.

In 1876, he competed in a contest for a grant to study in Rome and came in second-place. As a result, his Professor, Domingo, encouraged him to go to Rome regardless, if he could. After several years of teaching at the Escuela, this was accomplished in 1887, when he and a friend were able to go there at their own expense.

Once in Rome, they found a place in the workshops at the Palazzo Patrizi on the Via Margutta, where they shared a studio with other Spanish artists (mostly Valencians), including Salvador Sánchez Barbudo and the brothers José and Mariano Benlliure, with whom he formed a lifelong friendship. He completed his education at the Accademia Chigi; spending summers in Naples and Venice. Following a trip to Morocco and Egypt, he produced numerous Orientalist paintings.

After 1888, he also exhibited regularly in Berlín and Munich, winning several awards. In 1893, he won a Silver Medal at the Esposizione Internazionale di Roma with his painting "The Spinner". The following year, he was one of the artists who worked on an album dedicated to Queen Maria Christina.

In 1903, a few years after he was married, he left Rome and settled in Xàtiva, where his wife's family was from. Later, the Spanish government named him a Knight in the Order of Charles III. Most of his works in Spain are in the possession of private collectors, as the bulk of his paintings were sold abroad. In 1994, a major retrospective was held by the local government of Subiaco, near Rome.
