= José Ferrer de Couto =

Spanish military officer (1820–1877)

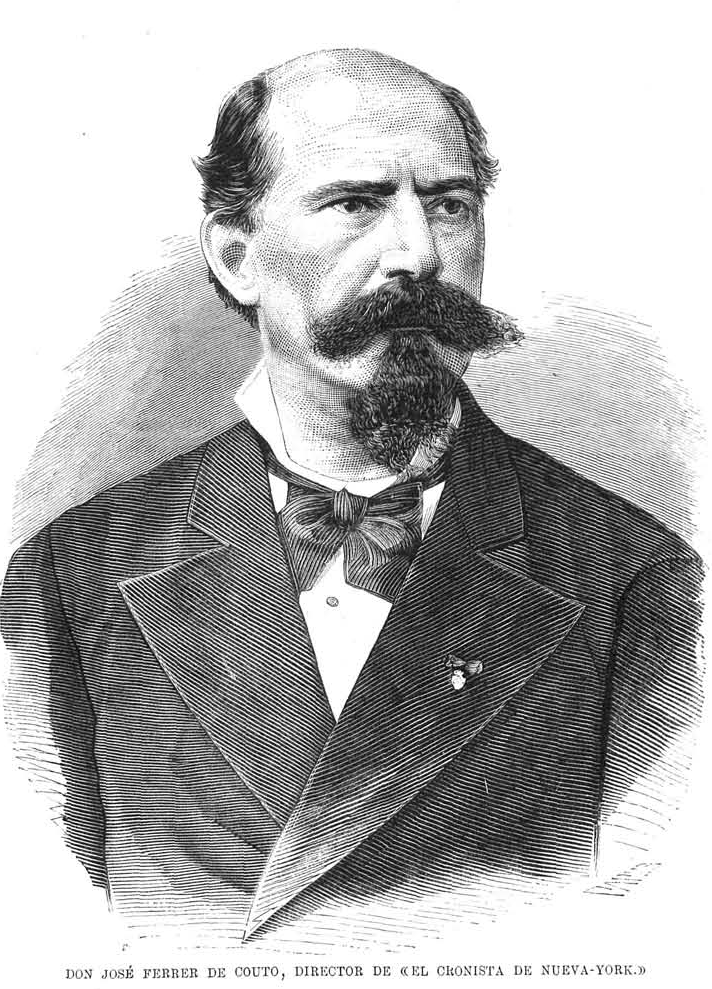
José Ferrer de Couto; engraving by Marcelo París, from La Ilustración Española y Americana (1874)

José Ferrer de Couto (14 July 1820, Ferrol - 1877, New York City) was a Spanish military officer, historian and journalist; founder of El Cronista de Nueva York.

== Biography ==
He was one of thirteen children born to Manuel Vicente Ferrer, a second-lieutenant in the infantry, and his wife, Manuela. He studied at the local military academy for sailors and pilots. In 1837, he became a second-lieutenant and was assigned to a unit fighting the Carlistas. He later published a tract called Morale in the Army, which created problems with his superiors, so he resigned from the service in 1844 and became a staunch advocate of separating the military from politics. Shortly after resigning, he wrote and published a three-volume Album of the Spanish Army, sponsored by Serafín Estébanez Calderón, a member of the Spanish military history commission.

This was followed by a History of the Royal Spanish Navy. At the same time, he wrote a History of the Naval Combat at Trafalgar that won him the cross of the Order of Charles III, and he was named a Commander in the Order of Isabella the Catholic. When the insurgent, Narciso López, was captured, he traveled to Cuba where he wrote Vindication of the Facts and Administration of the Spaniards in America, and America and Spain, a book directed against the United States and the Monroe Doctrine. The profits from these and other works went to help reimburse the war effort.

In 1863, upon the death of the publisher of La Crónica, a journal devoted to promoting Spanish interests in the United States, he was commissioned to take over as Director, but chose to create his own newspaper, El Cronista de Nueva York, in which he denounced piracy in the Caribbean, claiming it was the work of imperialist forces, and asserted that the election of Lincoln as President would inevitably lead to war with Spain. He also opposed Lincoln's abolitionist plans, and defended slavery, in a controversial book that was published in English and Spanish in 1864.

His paper was largely devoted to exposing the "lies" of the American press and fighting the efforts of Cuban emigrants who supported independence. He was challenged to several duels, which he fought in Canada, due to American laws prohibiting them. In 1875, he was challenged by Juan Bellido de Luna (1828-1902), editor of La Independencia. At the last minute, Bellido was replaced by Colonel Pío Rosado. The duel was fought in Europe, on the Belgian frontier, and De Couto was wounded on the right cheek.

Upon his death in 1877, the New York Times published a lengthy and positive obituary. He was buried in New York. Later, his remains were removed to Madrid.
