= List of Spanish women artists =

This is a list of women artists who were born in Spain or whose artworks are closely associated with that country.

== A ==
- Eulalia Abaitua Allende-Salazar (1853–1943), photographer
- Laia Abril (born 1986), photographer and writer
- María del Adalid (1873-1930), painter
- Pilar Albarracín (born 1968), performance artist, installation artist, photographer
- Julia Alcayde y Montoya (1885–1939), painter
- Edith Alonso (born 1974), sound artist
- Begoña Ameztoy (born 1951), writer and painter
- Olga Andrino (born 1955), painter, sculptor
- Lola Anglada (1893–1984), writer and illustrator
- Elena Asins (1940–2015), visual artist and writer
- Pilar Aymerich i Puig (born 1943), photographer and photojournalist

== B ==
- Carmen Babiano Méndez-Núñez (1852–1914), painter
- Isabel Bacardit (born 1960), painter
- Elena Bajo (born 1976), contemporary artist
- Antonia Bañuelos (1879–1926), painter
- Carmen Barbará (born 1933), comics artist and illustrator
- María Blanchard (1881–1932), painter
- Elena Blasco (born 1950), multidisciplinary artist
- Paula Bonet (born 1980), book illustrator and painter
- Elena Brockmann (1867–1946), historical painter
- Encarnación Bustillo Salomón (1876–1960), painter

== C ==
- Lita Cabellut (born 1961), painter based in The Hague
- Carmen Calvo (born 1950), conceptual artist
- Matilde Calvo Rodero (1899-1982), printmaker and bookbinder
- Pilar Calvo Rodero (1910-1974), sculptor, costume designer, set designer
- Purita Campos (1937–2019), cartoonist, illustrator and painter
- Roser Capdevila (born 1939), illustrator
- Esperanza Elena Caro (1906–1985), embroiderer
- Maria Luisa Carranque y Bonavía (18th century), pastellist
- Yolanda Castaño (born 1977), painter, literary critic and poet
- Carolina del Castillo Díaz (1867–1933), painter
- Rosana Castrillo Diaz (born 1971), drawer, sculptor, installation artist
- Carolina Ceca (born 1979), contemporary artist and art historian based in Tokyo
- Mari Chordà (born 1942), painter, poet, feminist
- La Chunga (born c. 1938), flamenco dancer, painter
- Anabel Colazo (born 1993), illustrator and cartoonist
- Colita (born 1940), pseudonym of Isabel Steva i Hernández, photographer
- Ana Corbero (born 1961), painter, sculptor
- Adelina Covián, contemporary painter
- Ángel María Cortellini (1819–1887), painter
- Angela de la Cruz (born 1965), artist
- Irene Cruz (born 1987), photographer

== D ==
- María Dávila (born 1990), contemporary painter
- Isabel de Santiago (1666–1714), colonial painter
- Dora Dolz (1941–2008), painter, sculptor, ceramist
- Patricia Dauder, multidisciplinary artist

== E ==
- Ende (10th century), manuscript illuminator
- Miriam Escofet (born 1967), portrait painter, now in England

== F ==
- María Ángeles Fernández Cuesta (born 1950), outsider artist
- Patricia Fernández (born 1980), artist based in Los Angeles
- Asunción Ferrer y Crespí (died 1818), painter
- Esther Ferrer (born 1937), interdisciplinary artist, educator
- Alicia Framis (fl. from late 1990s), contemporary artist
- Fernanda Frances Arribas (1862–1939), still life and flower painter
- Victoria Francés (born 1982), illustrator

== G ==
- Menchu Gal (1919–2008), painter
- Rosa Galcerán (1917–2015), cartoonist, advertising artist and poet
- Sofía Gandarias (1957–2016), painter
- Cristina García Rodero (born 1949), photographer
- Dora García (born 1965), contemporary artist
- Elvira Gascón (1911–2000), painter, engraver
- Alejandrina Gessler y Lacroix (1831–1907), painter
- Adela Ginés y Ortiz (1847–1923), painter
- Ana González (born 1970), fashion designer
- Marisa Gonzalez (born 1945), multimedia artist

== H ==
- Bárbara María Hueva (1733–1772), painter
- María Juana Hurtado de Mendoza (died 1818), painter

== I ==
- Cristina Iglesias (born 1956), installation artist and sculptor

== J ==
- Concha Jerez (born 1941), pioneer in conceptual art
- Carmen Jiménez (1920–2016), painter, sculptor, academic
- Ana Juan (born 1961), illustrator, painter

== L ==
- Carmen Laffón (1934–2021), figurative painter and sculptor
- Lalalimola (born 1984), illustrator
- Ouka Leele (born 1957), photographer
- Francesca Llopis (born 1956), mixed media artist
- Agustina González López (1891-1936), writer and artist from the Generation of '27
- Jil Love (fl. 2012), public performance art

== M ==
- Maruja Mallo (1902–1995), painter
- Anna Manel·la (1950–2019), sculptor and painter
- Inka Martí (born 1964), journalist, writer and photographer
- Cristina Martín Lara (born 1972), photographer
- María Teresa Martín-Vivaldi (born 1955), painter and engraver
- Francisca Efigenia Meléndez y Durazzo (1770–1825), miniaturist and pastellist
- María Mencía (fl. from 1999), media artist
- Cristina de Middel (born 1975), documentary photographer
- Isabel Muñoz (born 1951), photographer
- Paloma Muñoz (born 1965), photographer, visual artist

== N ==
- Nath-Sakura (born 1973), photographer
- Paloma Navares (active since the 1980s), interdisciplinary artist
- Eva Navarro (born 1967), painter
- Pilar Nouvilas i Garrigolas (1854–1938), painter
- Marina Núñez (born 1966), painter and academic

== O ==
- Josefa de Óbidos (1630–1684), Spanish-born Portuguese painter
- Elena Odriozola (born 1967), illustrator of books for children and young adults
- Ana Oncina (born 1989), comic book illustrator and writer
- Cris Ortega (born 1980), painter, writer and comics artist
- Cristina Otero (born 1995), photographer

== P ==
- Marta Palau Bosch (born 1934), Spanish-born tapestry and visual artist now based in Mexico
- Pepita Pardell (1928–2019), animator, cartoonist, illustrator and painter
- Ester Partegàs (born 1972), contemporary artist, now in New York
- Maria Pascual Alberich (1933–2011), illustrator
- María Luisa Pérez Herrero (1898–1934), painter
- Adriana Petit (born 1984), multidisciplinary artist
- Pepa Poch (born 1960), artist
- Núria Pompeia (1931–2016), cartoonist and writer
- Silvia Prada (active since 2002), illustrator, decorative artist, now in New York

== Q ==
- Nuria Quevedo (born 1938), painter and graphic artist
- Isabel Quintanilla (1938–2017), visual artist

== R ==
- Regina Raull (1928–2019), Spanish-born Mexican painter
- Moon Ribas (born 1985), avant-garde artist
- Lua Ribeira (born 1986), photographer
- Fina Rifà (fl. 1963), children's artist, illustrator
- María Luisa de la Riva y Callol-Muñoz (1865–1926), painter
- María Roësset Mosquera (1882–1921), Portuguese-born Spanish painter
- Marisa Roësset Velasco (1904–1976), painter
- Luisa Roldán (1652–1706), Spain's first female Baroque sculptor
- Covadonga Romero Rodríguez (1917–2018), sculptor and painter

== S ==
- Olga Sacharoff (1889‒1967), Georgian-born Spanish Surrealist painter
- Matilde Salvador i Segarra (1918–2007), composer, painter
- Isabel de Santiago (1666–c. 1714), Quito-born Spanish painter specializing in the Virgin and baby Jesus
- Ángeles Santos Torroella (1911–2013), Surrealist painter
- Soledad Sevilla (born 1944), painter, installation artist
- Mariana de Silva-Bazán y Sarmiento (1739–1784), aristocrat, poet, translator, painter
- Susana Solano (born 1946), sculptor
- Carme Solé Vendrell (born 1944), illustrator
- Elena Sorolla (1895–1975), sculptor and painter
- Francesca Stuart Sindici (1858–c. 1929), Spanish-Italian painter

== T ==
- Josefina Tanganelli Plana (1904–1966), cartoonist and painter
- Trini Tinturé (born 1935), cartoonist and illustrator
- Josefa Teixidor i Torres (1875–1914), Catalan painter
- María Teresa Torras (1927–2009), Spanish-Venezuelan artist specializing in sculpture, textiles and metalwork
- Manuela Trasobares (born 1962), artist, opera singer, politician

== U ==
- Amalia Ulman (born 1989), Argentinian-born Spanish artist now based in Los Angeles, US
- Ana Gertrudis de Urrutia Garchitorena (1812-1850), painter
- Carmina Useros (1928–2017), writer, ceramist and painter

== V ==
- Remedios Varo Uranga (1908–1963), Spanish-Mexican para-surrealist painter
- Dolors Vázquez Aznar (1955–2014), realist painter and lawyer
- Lluïsa Vidal i Puig (1876–1918), Catalan painter

== W ==
- Rosario Weiss Zorrilla (1814–1843), painter and engraver, known for portraits

== Y ==
- Hisae Yanase (1943–2019), Japanese-born ceramist, based in Córdoba
- Puri Yáñez (born 1936), surrealist painter

== W ==
- Rosario Weiss Zorrilla (1814–1843), painter and engraver
