= List of Spanish women photographers =

This is a list of women photographers who were born in Spain or whose works are closely associated with that country.

== A ==
- Laia Abril (born 1986), photographer, multiplatform storyteller
- Pilar Albarracín (born 1968), multidisciplinary artist, photographer
- Eulalia Abaitua Allende-Salazar (1853–1943), early Basque photographer
- Ana Arce (born 1964), photographer, curler
- Pilar Aymerich i Puig (born 1943), Catalan photographer, photojournalist

== C ==
- Colita (born 1940), photographer specializing in dance and portraits
- Irene Cruz (born 1987), photographer and video artist

== G ==
- Cristina García Rodero (born 1949), documentary photographer
- Carlota Guerrero (born 1989), artist, photographer and filmmaker

== L ==
- Ouka Leele (born 1957), photographer, poet
- Amalia López Cabrera (1837–after 1866), pioneering professional photographer

== M ==
- Isaura Marcos (born 1959), cloistered nun, photographer
- Inka Martí (born 1964), journalist, editor, writer, and photographer
- Cristina Martín Lara (born 1972), photographer, based in Berlin
- Cristina de Middel (born 1975), documentary photographer, artist, based in London
- Isabel Muñoz (born 1951), photographer, producing black-and-white photos of people such as bull-fighters, dancers or warriors

== N ==
- Anaïs Napoleón (c. 1827 – c. 1916), early French-born photographer producing daguerreotypes in Spain
- Nath-Sakura (born 1973), transgender Catalan reporter, photographer

== O ==
- Cristina Otero (born 1995), photographer, artist, specializing in self-portraits

== P ==
- Josefa Pla Marco (died 1870), pioneering professional photographer
- Dolores Gil de Pardo (1842–1876), pioneering photographer

== R ==
- Lua Ribeira (born 1986), feminist photographer

== S ==
- Benedicta Sánchez (born 1935), photographer and actress

== U ==
- Amalia Ulman (born 1989), Argentine-born Spanish contemporary artist

== See also ==
- List of women photographers
