= 1758 in music =

== Events ==
- Publication of the first English-language manual on the guitar.
- William Boyce becomes organist of the Chapel Royal.
- Giovanni Battista Locatelli takes his opera productions to Russia. Among the members of the troupe are the brothers Giuseppe and Vincenzo Manfredini.

== Popular music ==
- None listed

== Opera ==
- Baldassare Galuppi – Il Mondo alla Roversa
- Florian Leopold Gassmann – Issipile
- Christoph Willibald Gluck – 'L'île de Merlin, ou Le monde renversé
- Jean-Joseph Cassanéa de Mondonville – Les fêtes de Paphos, Op.10
- Davide Perez – Solimano
- Jean-Philippe Rameau – La Lyre enchantée
- Tommaso Traetta – Buovo d'Antona
- Johann Adolph Hasse
  - Il Sogno di Scipione
  - Demofoonte

== Classical music ==
- Charles Avison – Twelve Concertos, Op. 6 (London and Newcastle)
- Carl Philipp Emanuel Bach
  - Fugue in D minor, H.99
  - Sechs Sonaten für Clavier mit veränderten Reprisen, Wq.50 (H. 126, 136–140) (begun, completed 1759, published 1760)
  - Keyboard Sonata in A major, H.133
  - 12 Kleine Stücke, H. 600, Wq. 81
  - Geistliche Oden und Lieder I (Leipzig), H.686 (composed 1757)
- Franz Ignaz Beck – 6 Symphonies, Op. 1
- William Boyce – Overture No.7
- Giacomo Cervetto – 6 Trio Sonatas
- Baldassare Galuppi – L'oracolo del Vaticano
- Francesco Geminiani – The Harmonical Miscellany (periodical, in two volumes, London)
- Joseph Haydn - Symphony No. 37
- Michael Haydn
  - Symphony No. 1 in C major
  - Divertimento in C major, MH 27
- Pieter Hellendaal – 6 Concerti Grossi, Op. 3
- Johann Philipp Kirnberger – 8 Fugues (written for Prussian Princess Anna Amalia)
- Johann Adolph Scheibe – 3 Flute Sonatas, Op. 1
- Georg Philipp Telemann – Laudate Jehovam, TWV 7:25

== Methods and theory writings ==
- Jakob Adlung – Anleitung zu der musikalischen Gelahrtheit
- François Clément – Essai sur l'accompagnement du clavecin
- Friedrich Wilhelm Marpurg – Anleitung zur Singcomposition

== Births ==
- February 1 – Ludwig Gotthard Kosegarten, librettist and poet (died 1818)
- February 4 – Pierre-Gabriel Gardel, choreographer and ballet dancer (died 1840)
- February 7 – Benedikt Schack, operatic tenor and composer (d. 1826)
- February 12 – Christian Ignatius Latrobe, music collector and composer (died 1836)
- April 23 – Matthieu Frédéric Blasius, composer and violinist (died 1829)
- May 25 – Matthew Camidge, composer and organist (died 1844)
- June 4 – Joseph Dacre Carlyle, librettist and orientalist (died 1804)
- June 30 – António Leal Moreira, composer (died 1819)
- July – Nicolas-Julien Forgeot, French librettist (died 1798)
- August 25 – Franz Teyber, composer
- September 25
  - Maria Anna Thekla Mozart, cousin and correspondent of Wolfgang Amadeus Mozart (d. 1841)
  - Josepha Barbara Auernhammer, pianist and composer
- October 5
  - Thomas Greatorex, music collector and organist (died 1831)
  - August Heinrich Julius Lafontaine, librettist and novelist (died 1831)
- October 7 – Paul Anton Wineberger, composer
- November 16 – Peter Andreas Heiberg, librettist and author (died 1841)
- December 3
  - Louis Adam, French composer (died 1848)
  - Joseph Gelinek, composer and pianist (died 1825)
- December 11 – Carl Friedrich Zelter, composer and editor (died 1832)
- December 31 – Sophie Hagman, ballerina (d. 1826)
- Date unknown
  - Harriett Abrams, composer and musician (died 1821)
  - Glafira Alymova, harpsichordist (d. 1826)
  - Josep Gallés, composer and organist (died 1836)
  - Bernardo Porta, Italian composer (died 1829)
  - John Sale, composer and bass singer (died 1827)

== Deaths ==
- January 28 – Johann Paul Schiffelholz, composer for the mandora (born 1685)
- March 22 – Richard Leveridge, opera singer (born 1670)
- April 2 – Johann Balthasar König, German composer (born 1691)
- April 24 – Florian Wrastill, composer
- April 30 – François d'Agincourt, organist, harpsichordist and composer (born 1684)
- June – John Travers, organist and composer (born 1703)
- July 15 – Ambrosius Stub, librettist and poet (born 1705)
- October 4 – Giuseppe Antonio Brescianello, Italian composer and violinist (born c. 1690)
- October 14 – Wilhelmine Von Bayreuth, composer and princess (born 1709)
- November 20 – Johan Helmich Roman, composer (born 1694)
- November 27 – Senesino, castrato singer (born 1686)
- December 5 – Johann Friedrich Fasch, composer (born 1688)
- December 26 – François-Joseph de La Grange-Chancel, librettist and dramatist (born 1677)
- probable
  - Sanctus Seraphin, violin-maker (born 1699)
  - Giuseppe Ferdinando Brivio, Italian composer (born 1699)
