= Salabert (surname) =

Salabert is a surname. Notable people with the surname include:

- Andrés Avelino de Salabert y Arteaga
- Duda Salabert, Brazilian politician
- Francis Salabert (1884-1946), French music publisher
- Josep Gallés i Salabert
- Jordina Salabert
- Juana Salabert
- Luis Jesús Fernández de Córdoba y Salabert
