= Javier Yubero =

Spanish footballer

Personal information
- Full name: Francisco Javier Yubero Solanilla
- Date of birth: 21 January 1972
- Place of birth: Irun, Spain
- Date of death: 22 September 2005 (aged 33)
- Place of death: San Sebastián, Spain
- Height: 1.82 m (6 ft 0 in)
- Position: Goalkeeper

Youth career
- Dumboa Eguzki

Senior career*
Years	Team	Apps	(Gls)
1990–1992	San Sebastián	34	(0)
1992–1993	Real Sociedad	35	(0)
1993–1994	Betis	1	(0)
1994–1995	Mérida	0	(0)
1995–1998	Eibar	56	(0)
1998–1999	Rayo Vallecano	4	(0)
1999–2001	Amurrio	24	(0)
2001–2002	Zamora	26	(0)
2002	Lanzarote	3	(0)
2003	Torredonjimeno	6	(0)
Total		189	(0)
- * Club domestic league appearances and goals

Francisco Javier Yubero Solanilla (21 January 1972 – 22 September 2005) was a Spanish footballer who played as a goalkeeper.

== Football career ==
Born in Irun, Gipuzkoa, Yubero made his professional debut with Real Sociedad in 1991–92, playing in one game. In the following season, he won the battle for first-choice with another youth graduate of the club, Alberto, and was the undisputed starter as the Basques finished 13th in La Liga.

Subsequently, Yubero's career went downhill, with unassuming spells at Real Betis and CP Mérida in the second division. He settled in the same level with SD Eibar, and did appear in 39 matches in his third year but, after a move to Rayo Vallecano, again featured very rarely.

Yubero would play until early 2003, in divisions three and four. As he was with amateur side Torredonjimeno CF, he was diagnosed with pancreatic cancer, which forced him to quit the game at 31; two years later, he succumbed to the disease.
