= Encarnación Bustillo Salomón =

Spanish painter

- Born: Encarnación Paula Bustillo Salomón; 7 June 1876; Villarcayo, Spain
- Died: c. 1960
- Known for: Painting
- Notable work: Las camareras de la Virgen
- Style: Costumbrismo; Landscape; Still life

Encarnación Paula Bustillo Salomón (7 June 1876 – c. 1960) was a Spanish painter known for the costumbrismo genre, landscapes, and still lifes.

== Biography ==
Encarnación Bustillo Salomón was the daughter of Adelaida Salomón y San Martín, a native of Roa, and Fermín Bustillo y Pereda from Villacomparada de Rueda. Her maternal grandparents Sergio and Ramona came from Valladolid and Villanueva de los Caballeros, Palencia, while her paternal grandparents Antonio and Encarnación were natives of Villarcayo and Villacomparada de Rueda. Her family moved to Valladolid, where her father worked as a lawyer. Encarnación began her artistic studies there, and years later she moved to Madrid to continue them. Her teachers were Marceliano Santa María and Fernanda Francés.

She was a prolific artist who presented works to various exhibitions during the first half of the 20th century. The date and place of her death are unknown.

== Artistic career ==
In 1901 the magazine Última Hora dedicated a few lines to the work representing flowers and fruits that Bustillo had presented at the Exhibition of Fine Arts and Decorative Art. To the critic, her work was a typically feminine product, fruit of the sensitivity and special conditions of women. At that time, and in the eyes of some critics, the work of women painters was of a lower rank than that of men, and in their critiques there are paternalistic tones, totally different from those dedicated to men.

In 1903, the Boletín de la Sociedad Castellana de Excursiones dedicated an article to the first feminist exhibition held in Madrid at the Salón Amaré, in which women artists presented themselves individually "forming an artistic community worthy of consideration." Bustillo was one of the exhibitors with two works, and in the opinion of the same critic, "the dead flowers and game that she now exhibits are the work of a pure palette and a sincere study that predict successive advances in her career."

In this Salón Amaré exhibition, which emulated those held in Barcelona's Sala Parés, around 40 painters participated in the First Feminist Exhibition, including, in addition to Bustillo, Julia Alcayde (1855–1939), Fernanda Francés (1862–1939), and Marcelina Poncela (1864–1917). The criticism was totally favorable and the Álbum Ibero Americano cited them all.

In 1904 she presented at a fine arts exhibition with a painting of a column and planter, and she participated in numerous national exhibitions from 1901 to 1945, as well as in the Autumn Salons from 1942 to 1952, presenting easel paintings as pieces of decorative art, according to the titles of said works. The press covered her participation in the various national exhibitions, such as the Exhibition of Fine Arts in Madrid in 1926.

She also presented works at the National Exhibitions of Cuba and Panama from 1909 to 1916, where she won notable prizes (a gold medal at the Cuba exhibition in 1909 and a silver in 1911, as well as a silver at the Panama exhibition of 1913). In 1945 Bustillo presented the painting entitled Vendedoras de pescado (Fish Vendors) at the National Exhibition of Fine Arts, which was described by ABC's critic, as "a picture of a strong racial type".

In 1946 she participated in the First Women's Fine Arts Salon, an initiative to open a space for female artists who had usually been excluded. The Salon was a success; the critics considered it representative of the moment and Bustillo participated in the portrait category.

=== Las camareras de la Virgen ===
Encarnación Bustillo Salomón's best-known work is Las camareras de la Virgen (The Virgin's Waitresses). It is a 207 x 259 cm oil painting. It shows a group of waitresses in front of the image of the Virgin Mary, adorned for a party, who present a tray to the mayor, who gives a donation. The elderly waitress is richly attired, sporting an ostentatious scapular around her neck. The landscape in the background recalls the north of Burgos.

Bustillo presented it to the National Exhibition of Fine Arts in 1915, receiving a Third Class Medal. It is now on display at the Museo de Burgos.

== Awards ==
- 1909: Gold medal at the National Exhibition of Cuba
- 1911: Silver medal at the National Exhibition of Cuba
- 1913: Silver medal at the National Exhibition of Panama
- 1915: Third Class Medal at the National Exhibition of Fine Arts for Las camareras de la Virgen
