= Irun =

- Municipality
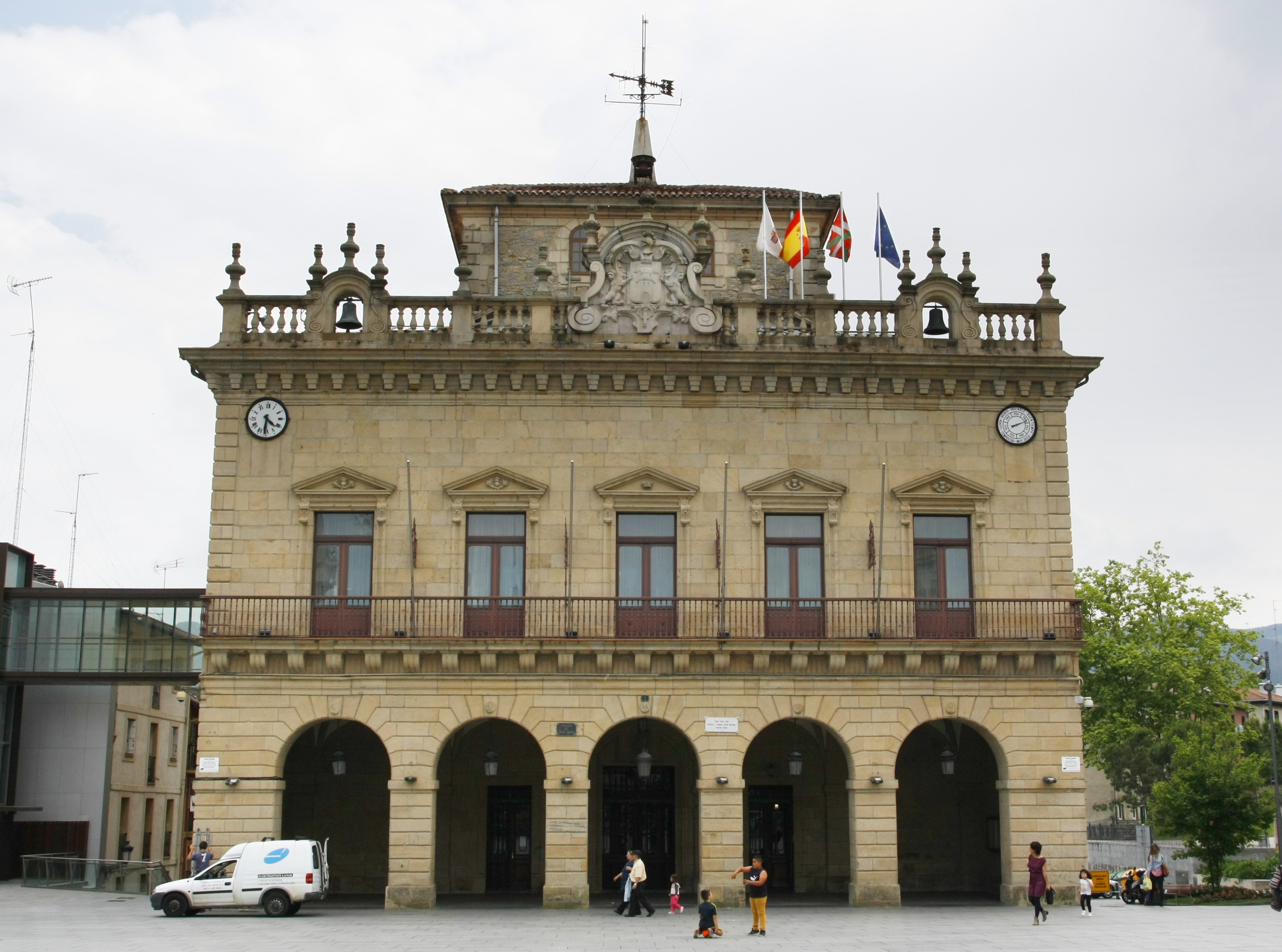
- Irun City Hall

- Flag Coat of arms
- Motto: Vigilantiae Custos
- Location of Irun within the Basque Autonomous Community Location of Irun within Spain
- Coordinates: 43°20′16.13″N 1°47′19.72″W
- Country: Spain
- Autonomous community: Euskadi
- Province: Gipuzkoa
- Eskualdea: Bidasoaldea
- Founded: 28 February 1776

Government
  - Mayor: Cristina Laborda Albolea (2023-) (PSE-EE)

Area
  - Total: 42.40 km^{2} (16.37 sq mi)
- Elevation: 20 m (66 ft)
- Highest elevation: 825 m (2,707 ft)
- Lowest elevation: 5 m (16 ft)

Population (2025-01-01)
  - Total: 63,835
  - Density: 1,506/km^{2} (3,899/sq mi)
- Demonym(s): irundar, irunés/irunesa
- Time zone: UTC+1 (CET)
  - Summer (DST): UTC+2 (CEST)
- Postal code: 20300-20305
- Website: Official website

Irun (Basque: Irun, Spanish: Irún) is a town of the Bidasoaldea region in the province of Gipuzkoa in the Basque Autonomous Community, Spain.

== History ==
It lies on the foundations of the ancient Oiasso, cited as a Roman-Vasconic town.

During the Spanish Civil War, the city was site of the 1936 Battle of Irun, which ended with a strategic victory for the Nationalist forces.

== Geography and transport ==
One of the biggest towns in Gipuzkoa, its location on the border between Spain and France, across the Bidasoa river from Hendaye, has made Irun into a commercial and logistic centre. Irun railway station is a major break-of-gauge where the SNCF 1,435 mm (4 ft 8 1/2 in) standard gauge rails meet the 1,668 mm (5 ft 5 21/32 in) broad gauge Renfe ones.

Currently Irun has a fairground with a modern exhibition and telecommunication facilities, just some 100 metres away from the actual border at the Santiago Bridge (river Bidasoa).

Irun is part of the conurbation of Txingudi bay with Hondarribia and Hendaye; the town is also within the area of the Eurocité Basque Bayonne-San Sebastián, a European economic interest grouping. (fr)

== Culture and tourism ==
One of its main festivals is the Alarde de San Marcial, a parade recreating an episode of the Peninsular War, held every year on 30 June.

There are hot mineral springs in the town.

=== Sports ===
The town is home to one of Europe's top handball teams, CD Bidasoa, who play at the Artaleku Udal Kiroldegia.

Its football club is Real Unión who play in the third tier, and are based at Stadium Gal. There is a Real Unión B in the fifth tier, Tercera RFEF.

== Climate ==
Irun has an oceanic climate courtesy of strong maritime moderation from the Bay of Biscay. Rainfall is frequent year-round since Irun is on the windward side of the Pyrenees. Rain often falls in high quantities on individual days with 1,649 millimetres (64.9 in) falling on just 138 days.

Climate data for San Sebastián Airport, Hondarribia, adjacent to Irun (1981–2010 normals)
Month	Jan	Feb	Mar	Apr	May	Jun	Jul	Aug	Sep	Oct	Nov	Dec	Year
Record high °C (°F)	24.6 (76.3)	28.6 (83.5)	29.0 (84.2)	32.4 (90.3)	36.6 (97.9)	39.8 (103.6)	40.4 (104.7)	40.0 (104.0)	38.0 (100.4)	33.4 (92.1)	29.4 (84.9)	26.0 (78.8)	40.4 (104.7)
Mean daily maximum °C (°F)	13.1 (55.6)	13.8 (56.8)	16.1 (61.0)	17.5 (63.5)	20.7 (69.3)	23.1 (73.6)	25.1 (77.2)	25.7 (78.3)	24.0 (75.2)	21.0 (69.8)	16.2 (61.2)	13.5 (56.3)	19.2 (66.6)
Daily mean °C (°F)	8.9 (48.0)	9.4 (48.9)	11.6 (52.9)	13.0 (55.4)	16.2 (61.2)	19.0 (66.2)	21.0 (69.8)	21.5 (70.7)	19.4 (66.9)	16.4 (61.5)	12.0 (53.6)	9.6 (49.3)	14.8 (58.6)
Mean daily minimum °C (°F)	4.7 (40.5)	5.0 (41.0)	7.0 (44.6)	8.5 (47.3)	11.8 (53.2)	14.8 (58.6)	16.9 (62.4)	17.2 (63.0)	14.7 (58.5)	11.8 (53.2)	7.8 (46.0)	5.6 (42.1)	10.5 (50.9)
Record low °C (°F)	−12.0 (10.4)	−13.0 (8.6)	−5.2 (22.6)	−1.2 (29.8)	3.0 (37.4)	5.3 (41.5)	7.8 (46.0)	8.4 (47.1)	4.6 (40.3)	0.8 (33.4)	−5.8 (21.6)	−8.4 (16.9)	−13.0 (8.6)
Average precipitation mm (inches)	157 (6.2)	135 (5.3)	124 (4.9)	156 (6.1)	120 (4.7)	95 (3.7)	85 (3.3)	117 (4.6)	132 (5.2)	167 (6.6)	188 (7.4)	174 (6.9)	1,649 (64.9)
Average precipitation days (≥ 1 mm)	13	12	12	14	12	10	9	10	10	12	13	12	138
Average snowy days	1	1	0	0	0	0	0	0	0	0	0	0	2
Average relative humidity (%)	75	72	70	71	72	73	74	75	75	75	76	75	74
Mean monthly sunshine hours	88	108	141	159	182	188	198	197	170	134	96	81	1,750
Source: Agencia Estatal de Meteorología

== People from Irun ==
- Manuel Anatol (8 May 1903 – 17 May 1990) was a naturalized French professional football player.
- Ramón Iribarren (1900 - 1967), Engineer who made notable contributions in the field of coastal engineering.
- Tirso de Olazábal y Lardizábal (1842–1921), Carlist politician
- Juan Olazábal Ramery (1860–1937), Carlist politician
- Luis Mariano, singer.
- Amaia Montero, singer.
- Fermin Muguruza, singer.
- Alberto Górriz, footballer.
- Alberto López Fernández, footballer.
- Iñaki Descarga, footballer.
- Javier Garrido, footballer.
- Javier Irureta, footballer.
- Javier Yubero, footballer.
- Luis Regueiro, footballer.
- Patricio Arabolaza, footballer.
- Oier Olazábal, footballer.
- Sergio Francisco, footballer.
- Juan Manuel Gárate, cyclist.
- Basilio Sánchez Beguiristáin, mayor of the Chilean commune of Pichilemu.
- Kortatu, punkrock band
- Menchu Gal, painter
- Jon Sistiaga, reporter
- Leontxo García, chess player & commentator for the El País newspaper
- Mari Jose Urruzola, educator, feminist, writer
- Domingo de Arrivillaga y Urdinsso, Guatemalan Settler, mayor of Santiago de Guatemala.

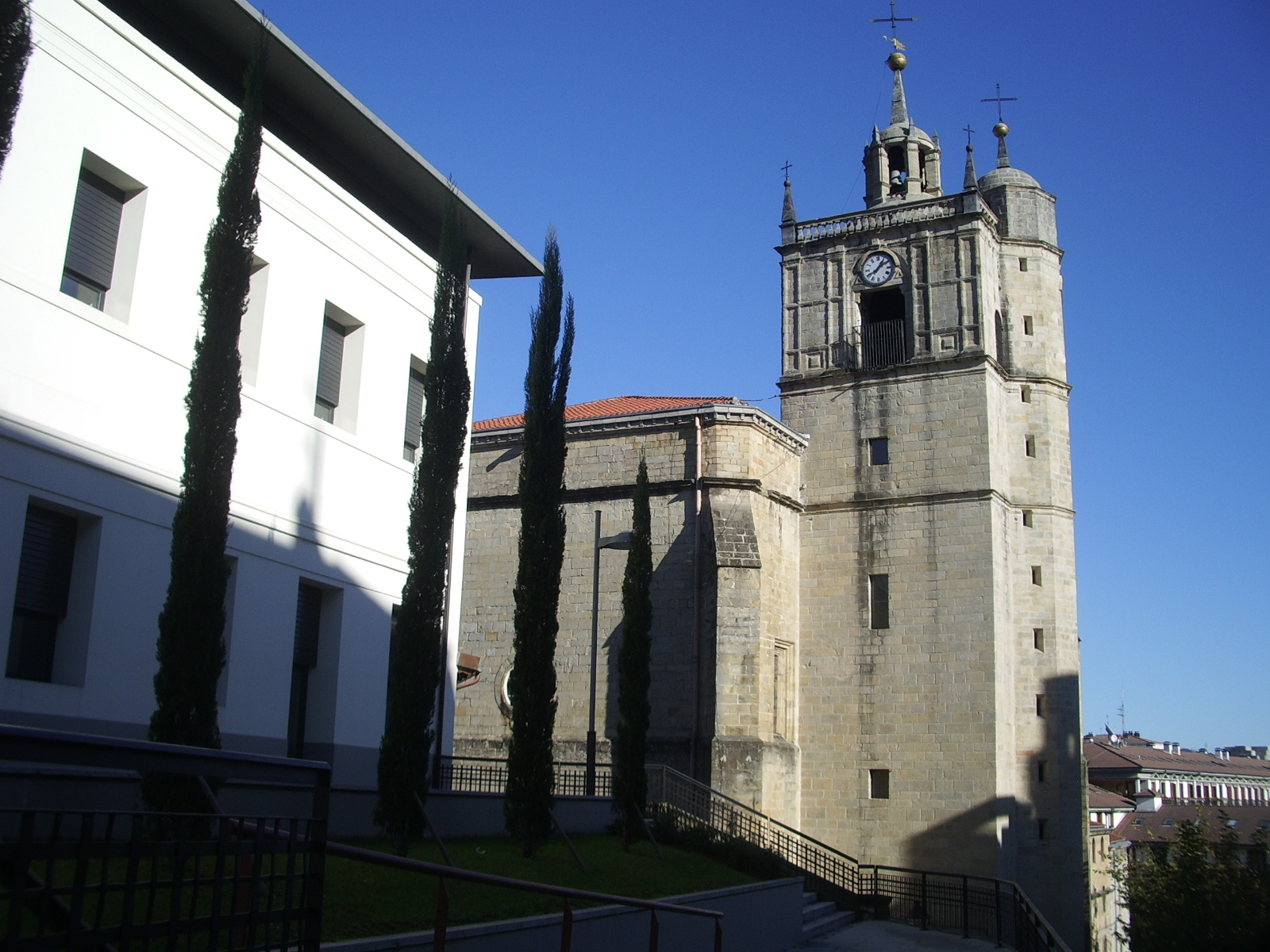
Junkaleko Andre Maria church, Irun
