= Josefa Pla Marco =

Spanish photographer (died 1870)

Josefa Pla Marco (died 1870) was a Spanish photographer. She is, alongside Amalia López Cabrera, known as one of the first pioneer professional female photographers in Spain. She married the photographer Vicente Bernad Vela of Valencia in 1850, and managed his studio after his death.
