= Alberto López (footballer, born 1969) =

Spanish footballer and manager

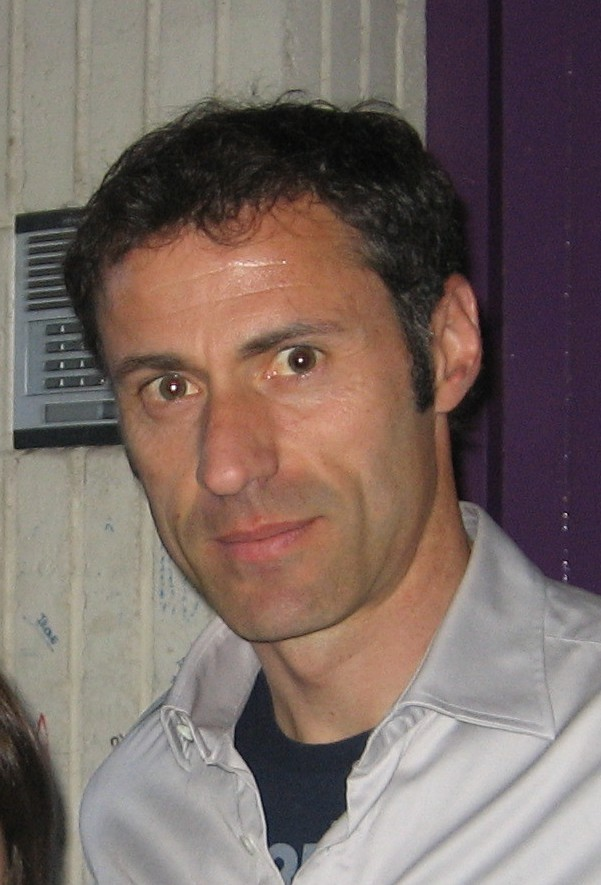
- López in 2009

Personal information
- Full name: Alberto López Fernández
- Date of birth: 20 May 1969 (age 57)
- Place of birth: Irun, Spain
- Height: 1.82 m (6 ft 0 in)
- Position: Goalkeeper

Team information
- Current team: Real Unión B (manager)

Youth career
- 1986: Dumboa Eguzki
- 1987: Real Sociedad

Senior career*
Years	Team	Apps	(Gls)
1987–1993	Real Sociedad B	47	(0)
1987–1989	→ Pasajes (loan)		
1993–2006	Real Sociedad	346	(0)
2006–2009	Valladolid	42	(0)
Total		435	(0)

International career
1998–2001	Basque Country	4	(0)

Managerial career
- 2011–2012: Real Unión B
- 2013–2014: Alavés (assistant)
- 2014–2015: Alavés
- 2016: Valladolid
- 2025–: Real Unión B
- * Club domestic league appearances and goals

Alberto López Fernández (born 20 May 1969) is a Spanish former professional footballer who played as a goalkeeper.

He spent the bulk of his career at Real Sociedad, for whom he appeared in 377 competitive matches. He is the current manager of Real Unión B.

== Playing career ==
=== Real Sociedad ===
A product of Basque Country giants Real Sociedad's youth system, López was born in Irun, and made his first appearances with the first team in the closing stages of the 1992–93 season, having played understudy to the inconsistent Javier Yubero for most of the year. He would be the undisputed starter from the following campaign onwards, missing only a total of seven La Liga games in the next seven years (in 1997–98, as Real ranked third, he played all 38 matches and conceded 37 goals).

López had to compete for the starting job with newly signed Sander Westerveld from 2001–02 onwards. He finished the season with 18 appearances, but had just one the following campaign as the Dutchman was first choice for the runners-up.

=== Valladolid ===
Following the emergence of another youth product at Real Sociedad, Asier Riesgo, López was deemed surplus to requirements and joined Real Valladolid in the Segunda División on a one-year deal. In 2006–07, he helped the side to return to the top flight after a three-year absence while also collecting a Ricardo Zamora Trophy – 36 matches, 29 goals.

In the following season, López acted as backup and helped develop wonderkid Sergio Asenjo (20 years his junior), and had his contract extended until June 2009 after which he retired at the age of 40.

== Coaching career ==
López started working as a manager in 2011, with Real Unión's reserves. He joined Juan Carlos Mandiá's staff at Deportivo Alavés two years later, being named his successor late into the second-tier campaign and eventually leading the team to safety.

On 12 June 2015, after again managing to stay afloat, López left the Mendizorrotza Stadium. In 53 league games in charge, he collected 19 wins and 20 losses.

López returned to Valladolid on 26 April 2016, taking the place of the dismissed Miguel Ángel Portugal.

== Style of play ==
A player with good one-on-one skills, López had a weakness in crossing situations.

== Career statistics ==
Appearances and goals by club, season and competition
Club	Season	League			Cup		Europe		Total	
Club	Season	Division	Apps	Goals	Apps	Goals	Apps	Goals	Apps	Goals
Real Sociedad B	1991–92	Segunda División B	23	0	—		—		23	0
Real Sociedad B	1992–93	Segunda División B	24	0	—		—		24	0
Real Sociedad B	Total		47	0	—		—		47	0
Real Sociedad	1992–93	La Liga	4	0	1	0	—		5	0
Real Sociedad	1993–94	La Liga	34	0	4	0	—		38	0
Real Sociedad	1994–95	La Liga	38	0	4	0	—		42	0
Real Sociedad	1995–96	La Liga	41	0	2	0	—		43	0
Real Sociedad	1996–97	La Liga	42	0	1	0	—		43	0
Real Sociedad	1997–98	La Liga	38	0	3	0	—		41	0
Real Sociedad	1998–99	La Liga	37	0	1	0	6	0	44	0
Real Sociedad	1999–2000	La Liga	37	0	1	0	—		38	0
Real Sociedad	2000–01	La Liga	28	0	1	0	—		29	0
Real Sociedad	2001–02	La Liga	18	0	0	0	—		18	0
Real Sociedad	2002–03	La Liga	1	0	0	0	—		1	0
Real Sociedad	2003–04	La Liga	18	0	2	0	2	0	22	0
Real Sociedad	2004–05	La Liga	4	0	2	0	—		6	0
Real Sociedad	2005–06	La Liga	6	0	1	0	—		7	0
Real Sociedad	Total		346	0	23	0	8	0	377	0
Valladolid	2006–07	Segunda División	35	0	1	0	—		36	0
Valladolid	2007–08	La Liga	7	0	3	0	—		10	0
Valladolid	2008–09	La Liga	0	0	0	0	—		0	0
Valladolid	Total		42	0	4	0	—		46	0
Career total			435	0	27	0	8	0	470	0

== Managerial statistics ==
As of 23 May 2026

Managerial record by team and tenure
Team	Nat	From	To	Record								Ref
Team	Nat	From	To	G	W	D	L	GF	GA	GD	Win %	Ref
Real Unión B	(Spain)	1 July 2011	21 June 2012	34	18	7	9	63	41	+22	52.94	
Alavés	(Spain)	24 March 2014	12 June 2015	57	21	14	22	68	69	−1	36.84	
Valladolid	(Spain)	26 April 2016	4 June 2016	7	1	3	3	7	11	−4	14.29	
Real Unión B	(Spain)	18 June 2025	Present	34	23	10	1	70	15	+55	67.65	
Career total				132	63	34	35	208	136	+72	47.73	—

== Honours ==
Valladolid

- Segunda División: 2006–07
