= Real Unión B =

Spanish football club

- Full name: Real Unión Club "B", S.A.D.
- Nickname: Roca
- Founded: 1923; 103 years ago (as CD Roca)
- Ground: Anexo del Stadium Gal, Irun, Basque Country, Spain
- Capacity: 500
- Owner: Unai Emery
- President: Igor Emery
- Head coach: Alberto López
- League: Tercera Federación – Group 4
- 2025–26: División de Honor, 1st of 18 (champions)
- Website: realunionclub.com
Home colours	Away colours

Real Unión Club "B", S.A.D. is a Spanish football club based in Irun, in the autonomous community of the Basque Country, in the province of Gipuzkoa, near the border with France. Founded in 1923 as Club Deportivo Roca, they are the reserve team of Real Unión, and play in Tercera Federación – Group 4.

== History ==
Founded in 1923 as Club Deportivo Roca, the club started playing senior competitions three years later, and enjoyed their best years in the following decade, where they won six Segunda Regional de Guipúzcoa titles (but rejected promotion) and played in the 1935 Copa del Presidente de la República. After the Spanish Civil War, the club began their association with Real Unión, having agreements of affiliation to act as their reserve team, but ceased activities in 1970.

In 1980, Roca returned to an active status, but now under the name of Club Deportivo Roca-Real Unión, again as an affiliate side of the Txuri-beltz. In 1992, after a change of ruling which obliged most of the reserve sides to adopt naming, shield and kits of their parent club, Roca was renamed Real Unión B.

Real Unión B achieved a first-ever promotion to a national division in 2000, reaching the Tercera División. Relegated in 2002, the club returned to the fourth tier in 2006, being immediately relegated back.

== Season to season ==
- As an independent team

Season	Tier	Division	Place	Copa del Rey
1926–1934	—	Regional	—	
1934–35	5	2ª Reg.		First round
1935–36	5	2ª Reg.		
1940–41	DNP			
1941–42	4	2ª Reg.	(R)	
1942–1948	DNP			
1948–49	4	1ª Reg.	5th	
1949–50	4	1ª Reg.	13th	
1950–51	DNP			
1951–52	DNP			
1952–53	DNP			
1953–54	5	2ª Reg.	4th	
1954–55	5	2ª Reg.	2nd	
1955–56	4	1ª Reg.	7th	
1956–57	4	1ª Reg.	6th	
1957–58	4	1ª Reg.	10th	
1958–59	DNP			
1959–60	5	2ª Reg.	(R)	
1960–61	5	2ª Reg.		
1961–62	5	2ª Reg.		

Season	Tier	Division	Place	Copa del Rey
1962–63	5	2ª Reg.		
1963–64	5	2ª Reg.		
1964–65	5	2ª Reg.		
1965–66	4	1ª Reg.	5th	
1966–67	4	1ª Reg.	6th	
1967–68	4	1ª Reg.	12th	
1968–69	5	2ª Reg.	12th	
1969–70	5	2ª Reg.	3rd	
1970–1980	DNP			
1980–81	6	1ª Reg.	5th	
1981–82	6	1ª Reg.	8th	
1982–83	6	1ª Reg.	8th	
1983–84	6	1ª Reg.	10th	
1984–85	6	1ª Reg.	10th	
1985–86	6	1ª Reg.	11th	
1986–87	6	1ª Reg.	14th	
1987–88	6	1ª Reg.	10th	
1988–89	6	1ª Reg.	4th	
1989–90	6	1ª Reg.	6th	
1990–91	6	1ª Reg.	4th	

Season	Tier	Division	Place	Copa del Rey
1991–92	6	1ª Reg.	1st	

- As Real Unión's reserve team

Season	Tier	Division	Place
1992–93	5	Reg. Pref.	10th
1993–94	5	Reg. Pref.	7th
1994–95	5	Reg. Pref.	11th
1995–96	5	Reg. Pref.	11th
1996–97	5	Reg. Pref.	14th
1997–98	5	Reg. Pref.	4th
1998–99	5	Reg. Pref.	12th
1999–2000	5	Reg. Pref.	1st
2000–01	3	3ª	14th
2001–02	3	3ª	16th
2002–03	5	Reg. Pref.	8th
2003–04	5	Reg. Pref.	7th
2004–05	5	Reg. Pref.	5th
2005–06	5	Reg. Pref.	1st
2006–07	3	3ª	17th
2007–08	5	Reg. Pref.	4th
2008–09	5	Reg. Pref.	3rd
2009–10	5	Div. Hon.	8th
2010–11	5	Div. Hon.	2nd
2011–12	5	Div. Hon.	5th

Season	Tier	Division	Place
2012–13	5	Div. Hon.	3rd
2013–14	5	Div. Hon.	10th
2014–15	5	Div. Hon.	10th
2015–16	5	Div. Hon.	3rd
2016–17	5	Div. Hon.	6th
2017–18	5	Div. Hon.	11th
2018–19	5	Div. Hon.	13th
2019–20	5	Div. Hon.	17th
2020–21	5	Div. Hon.	7th
2021–22	6	Div. Hon.	15th
2022–23	7	Pref.	1st
2023–24	6	Div. Hon.	9th
2024–25	6	Div. Hon.	3rd
2025–26	6	Div. Hon.	1st
2026–27	5	3ª Fed.	

- 3 seasons in Tercera División
- 1 season in Tercera Federación
