= Ana Gertrudis de Urrutia Garchitorena =

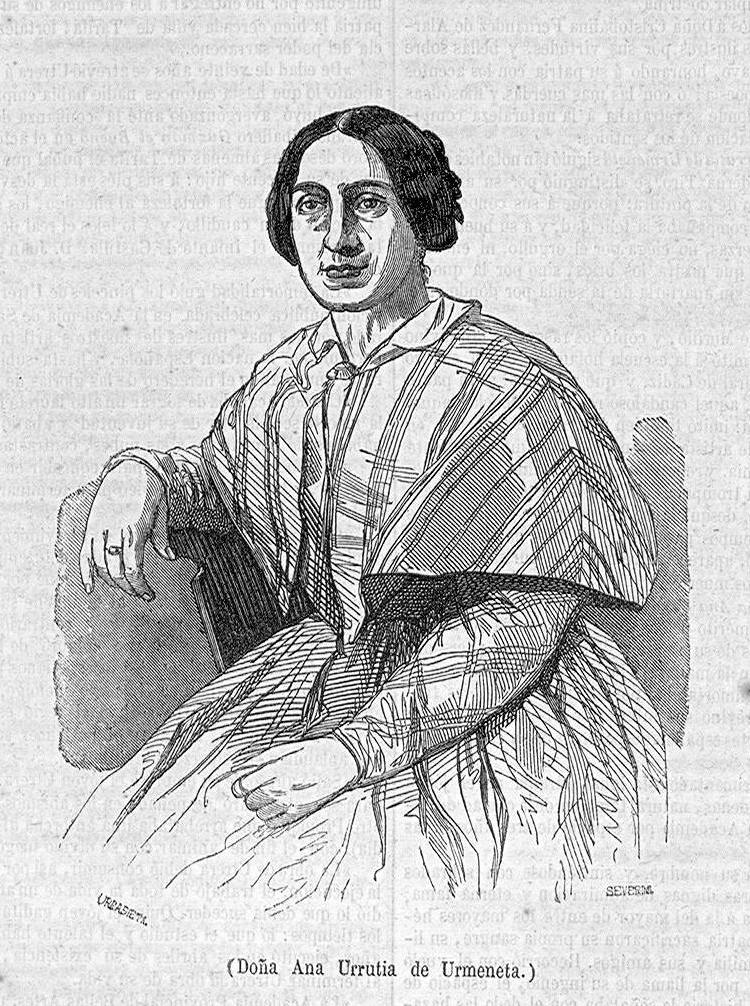
- Born: 1812; Cádiz, Spain
- Died: 1850 (aged 37–38)
- Notable work: San Gerónimo; Santa Filomena y La resurrección de la carne
- Style: romantic; historical; religious; miniaturist; portraiture
- Spouse: Juan José de Urmeneta
- Relatives: Francisco Javier de Urrutia (brother)

Ana Gertrudis de Urrutia Garchitorena (also known as Ana de Urrutia and Ana Gertrudis Urrutia de Urmeneta; 1812 – November 5, 1850) was a 19th-century Spanish painter who became an Academician of Merit at the Real Academia Provincial de Bellas Artes de Cádiz Royal Provincial Academy of Fine Arts of Cádiz, an appointment she received on December 9, 1846. Alejandrina Gessler y Lacroix was her contemporary.

== Early life and education ==
Ana Gertrudis de Urrutia Garchitorena was born in Cádiz, in 1812. Her were Tomás de Urrutia and Ana Garchitorena. Her brother was Francisco Javier de Urrutia, an important artist and man of letters from Cádiz who oversaw his sister's artistic education.

== Career ==
As a painter, she distinguished herself in the portraiture, historical, and religious genres, in miniaturist and romantic styles.

Her compositions are well-structured, and display a style with Neoclassical roots, showing some influence from Bartolomé Esteban Murillo.

She produced a considerable number of oil paintings that were publicly exhibited in Cádiz. Standing out among her body of work is San Gerónimo, a painting in the Dutch style, which the artist gifted to the Cádiz Cathedral; Santa Filomena y La resurrección de la carne; and an oil painting known as El Juicio, which was exhibited in Cádiz in 1846 and featured in that year's National Exhibition. Also worthy of mention are La estigmatización de San Francisco, also known as Visión de las llagas de San Francisco, executed in 1841 and housed in the Cathedral Museum of Cádiz; and Retrato de Don Joaquín Fonsdeviela, which she donated to the Academy in 1847 and which is on display at the Museum of Cádiz.

== Personal life ==
She married the painter Juan José de Urmeneta who was a professor of painting and sculpture and eventually served as director of the Royal Provincial Academy of Fine Arts of Cádiz.

Ana Gertrudis de Urrutia Garchitorena died in 1850.

== Awards and honours ==
Her recognition was such that the Royal Provincial Academy of Fine Arts of Cádiz placed a portrait of the artist, painted by her husband, in the hall where its sessions were held, and she was mentioned and commemorated by Adolfo de Castro in the speech delivered in 1851 during the awards ceremony for the school's students.
