= International Colour Authority =

Organization

The International Colour Authority (ICA) is a private organization publishing forecasts about colour trends for the coming seasons, to be used by industry designers. It also awards a Seal of Approval that companies may display in their promotional materials if the colour ranges they use are appraised by the ICA.

ICA forecasts were launched in 1968. Since then, a panel of international colour specialists, the Spanish Painter Pepa Poch among them, gathers twice a year in London to select the next colour palette. The selection is published 22 months ahead of the retail selling season, thus constituting the earliest colour trend prediction available to the furniture design and textile industries. Nowadays the ICA is one of the leading colour forecasters for the industry, along with the Color Marketing Group. Their products are "high-quality forecast publications containing an abundance of accurate information on market trends", which ranks them among "the favourite publications of many professionals", according to an article published by the International Trade Centre.

Colours in the ICA colour guides are referenced using the Pantone standard, the Natural Color System (NCS) standard, or both.

ICA has now launched an online service through which subscribers can download the forecasts, and is creating an online newsletter, World Colour News.

== Other color organizations ==
=== Color forecasting trade associations ===
- The Color Marketing Group (CMG)
- The Color Association of the United States (CAUS)
- The International Colour Authority (ICA)

=== Color matching/management organizations ===
- Pantone
- International Color Consortium (ICC)
- International Commission on Illumination

== See also ==
- Graphic design
- Interior design
- Textiles
