= Color Marketing Group =

Organization

- Type: Association
- Industry: Marketing
- Founded: 1962; United States
- Headquarters: United States
- Number of locations: International
- Area served: Worldwide
- Website: www.colormarketing.org

The Color Marketing Group (CMG) is an international association for color design professionals which identifies the direction of color and design trends and translates them into salable colors for manufactured products.

Composed of nearly 1,000 members in 20 countries, CMG forecasts color trends from one to three years in advance for color-related products and services. These products and services include: Action/Recreation, Consumer Goods, Technology, Home, Visual Communications, Transportation, Juvenile Products, Fashion, and environments for Office, Health Care, Retail, Hospitality/Entertainment and Institutional/Public Spaces

== Color conferences ==
On average, 400 members gather at CMG's semi-annual Conferences, to work with fellow professionals on producing a Color Mandate. Each Conference is a global forum for the exchange of non-competitive information on all phases of color marketing.

Workshops held at CMG Conference mandate trends and their influences on design and color. These "influences" run the gamut from social issues to politics, the environment, the economy and cultural diversity. Colors are inter-industry related. As such, one industry influences another, causing color to be dynamic.

While the result of each semi-annual Conference is the development of a Color Forecast, a key part of these Conferences is the exchange and sharing of information that takes place among members. Knowing what forces and factors are influencing shifts in color directions, as seen through the eyes of their CMG colleagues, is as important to the Color Designer as the Forecast itself.

== Other color organizations ==
=== Color forecasting trade associations ===
- The Color Marketing Group (CMG)
- The Color Association of the United States (CAUS)
- The International Colour Authority (ICA)

=== Color matching/management organizations ===
- Pantone
- International Color Consortium (ICC)
- International Commission on Illumination

== See also ==
- Graphic design
- Interior design
- Textiles
