= Pepa Poch =

Spanish artist

- Born: 1960 (age 65–66); Barcelona, Catalonia, Spain
- Education: Escola Massana
- Occupation: Artist
- Website: http://www.pepapoch.com

Pepa Poch (Barcelona, 1960) is a Spanish artist, creator and painter known for her personal use of colour. She is a former member of the International Colour Authority, and the colors of her oil paintings are global color trend.

== Art career ==
Poch is the daughter of artists Francesc Poch i Romeu and Josefina Ripoll, Pepa Poch studied Arts at Escola Massana of Barcelona. In 1980, she got a Pierre Cardín scholarship and obtained the Honorable Foundation Roviralta prize. She has opened exhibits at Museums and International Art Fairs, such as: ArteAméricas, Art Basel (Miami), Copec (Paris), Instituto Cervantes (Chicago), CSV The Incubator of Art in New York, Museum of Fine Arts of Tenerife (Spain), Museum Foundation Bolivariano (Colombia), 11th Biennial of Havana (Cuba), Ayala Museum of Manila (Philippines), and The Royal Institute of Architects (London), among others.

Her most highlighted solo exhibitions are "La Mar Salada" (2004) which visited Madrid and Cordoba (Spain); "Survivors", an internationally acclaimed exhibition which opened in Barcelona in 2008, and was also shown in Luxembourg, Chicago, New York, Miami and Tenerife. In 2009 the solo show "De la supervivencia al Renacimiento" or "Renaissance" was opened in Sitges (Barcelona, Spain), and travelled to Val d'Aran (Spain). In 2011 was opened the solo exhibit "Te Turquoise" at Sargadelos Gallery in Barcelona, and that same year she participated in the exhibition "Sister Cities Miami Beach 2011" at the Art Deco Welcome Center (Miami). In 2012 he participated in the 11th Biennial of Havana, Cuba, with the project "Pepa Poch, a Mediterranean Caribbean". In 2013 took place the solo exhibition "Pepa Poch Philippines" at the Ayala Museum of Manila (Philippines), and that same year the solo show "Talking Place" was opened in the Martin Elements Cork Gallery (Spain), and later at the Royal Institute of British Architecture in London. In 2014, the solo exhibition "Infinite Lanzarote" opened at the Museum Art Gallery Ermita de San Antonio de Aunts, Lanzarote.

== Bibliography ==
- Realidad Mágica. Ediciones Umbral, 2002.
- La Mar Salada. Editorial SYL, Creaciones Gráficas, 2004.
- Oil on Canvas. Generalitat de Catalunya, departament de Cultura, 2005.
- Bentz, Josep Fèlix. Survivors. New York: Europa Museum Conceptual Art, 2007. ISBN 978-3-937601-62-5.
