= Isabel Bacardit =

Spanish painter (born 1960)

Maria Isabel Preñanosa Bacardit (born 1960 in Barcelona) is a Spanish painter.

== Biography ==
Isabel Bacardit was born in Barcelona, Spain, in 1960. She started her artistic education at the School of Arts of Poblenou, with Miquel Simó as her teacher, then moved on to the Escola d’Arts Aplicades i Oficis Artistics (Llotja) in Barcelona.

Starting as an abstract painter, she painted on materials she found in the street: cardboard, wood, etc. Inspired by urban images, she painted using pigments mixed with sawdust and paper-paste to achieve densities and textures. Her compositions were based on primary colours.

In 1984 she was selected for the Fifth Biennale of Barcelona- Young Contemporary Painting. In 1985 she took part in the First Exhibition of Young Art in Madrid and in the First Biennale of Young Cultural Productions of the European Mediterranean. In 1986 she was again selected for the Second Exhibition of Young Art in Madrid.

With the unexpected death of her partner, the painter Xavier Vidal i Banchs in 1984, Bacardit changed the theme of her work, taking inspiration now from the accidental changes of life. She created a series of works based on The Disasters of War by Goya and painted proceeding from photographs of accidents taken from newspapers. She also changed her palette, turning to dark and earthen colours.

In 1986, due to the works in preparation for the 1992 Olympics, her paintings reflected the transformation of Barcelona, taking machines and diggers as her main motives.

In 1987 she illustrated the poem Helicón by Bruno Montané Krebs. She travels to Berlin, where she resided for a year. Here her themes were the signs of war, still visible on the buildings in the divided city. She exhibited in the gallery Vendemmia with the title "This is my Silence".

In 1988 she moved to Mallorca, where she came in contact with the theatre works of the Polish author Tadeusz Kantor. She created the portfolio "The right to live in peace", with paintings inspired by the theatre of this author.

In 1989 she took up residence in Santa Coloma de Farnés (Spain). In the midst of nature she changed her themes dramatically. Her work found inspiration in the landscape, light and silence. She left her work on the theme of death, with its dense materiality, behind, moving towards watercolours and transparencies.

In 1990 she lived in Rio de Janeiro, where she worked with organisations for the welfare of street children, gave painting classes and established her studio in the gallery Maria Teresa Vieira. In Salvador de Bahia she exhibited a series of erotic drawings at the University of Fine Arts.

In 1991 she arrived in Chile. She exhibited in the gallery Buchi in Santiago de Chile and lives in Valparaíso. She collaborates with various artists: Edgard del Canto (painter), Alma Martinoia (painter), Ivo Vergara (painter), Cristina Correa (painter), Teresa Olivera (actress), Hernan Varela (stained glass artist) and Víctor Barrientos Ormazábal (actor and theatre director). With them, she founded the theatre company "Theatre only for Fools".

She began her series "Earth, Air, Water and Fire". On request of the cultural centre Las Condes of Santiago de Chile she built a large scale sculpture out of papier-mache and acrylics: "Bird Woman" which was dedicated to the flamenco dancer Carmen Amaya. For the theatre company "Theatre of Silence" she created the life size puppets of the play "Taca taca mon amour" by Mauricio Celedón.

In 1994 she returned to Barcelona. She abandoned abstract painting and returns to the figurative. In this period stand out:

- The installation "Since ever, until when, since ever" for the "Meeting of Street Artists" in Granada.
- An Exhibition in the civic centre Can Felipa with the collective "Art by Women", with works based on the theme of the female reproductive organs and birth.
- The installation "Shoe-house Zapata"
- Poeto-musical actions with Lucho Hermosilla, Steven Forster and Gaspar Lucas with the poem Altazor by Vicente Huidobro.

In 1996 she traveled to Mexico. She met Ofelia Medina and made contact with the Zapatista communities in Chiapas, where she became strongly influenced by elements of indigenous symbolism and spirituality.

In 1997 she returned to Barcelona. In collaboration with Primitiva Reverter, Judit Bacardit, Montserrat Baqués, Mercè Candó, Caty Fernández and Aina Reverter she initiated the publication of the magazine Adiosas. With the same artists she exhibited in the gallery Espai22a.

In 1998 she worked with the Dutch travelling theatre company "Azart Ship of Fools". She traveled and acted on the boat of the company and created masks and part of the costumes for the work The Pilgrim at the End of the World.

In 1999 she established herself in Vilarnadal (Girona, Spain), where she lived for six years in an old mill. She painted and cultivated the earth.

In 2002 she exhibited, together with her sister, the sculptor Judit Bacardit, in the information centre of the Parc dels Aiguamolls de l’Empordà and in the exhibition rooms of the Caixa Girona in Roses.

In 2003 they exhibited again at this location. She participated in the European meeting of woman artists "In Via" in Switzerland.

In 2004 she created the stage design and decorations for the programme "The Ship of Fools" for the local television in Amsterdam.

Since 2005 she lives in Barcelona.
