= María Teresa Torras =

Venezuelan artist, sculptor (1927–2009)

Maria Teresa Torras (née Maria Teresa Recoder; Villacarlos, Menorca, 2 January 1927 – Caracas, 7 March 2009), was Venezuelan-nationalized Spanish artist specializing in sculpture, textiles and metalwork.

== Individual exhibitions ==
- 2006, Síntesis Geométrica. Galería D’Museo, Caracas, Venezuela.
- 2001, Lanzas Contra El tiempo. Galería D’Museo, Caracas, Venezuela.
- 1998, “Código X”, Museo de Arte Contemporáneo de Caracas Sofía Imber, Caracas.
- 1994, “Macabeos”, Galería de Arte Nacional, Caracas. “Torsos Fragmentados”, Galería UNO, Caracas.
- 1990, “Testigos Silentes”, Museo de Bellas Artes, Caracas.
- 1984, Sala Mendoza, Caracas. Museo de Arte Moderno “Mario Abreu”, Aragua.
- 1979, “Tapices”, Galería de Arte/Contacto, Caracas.
- 1976, Joyas, Galería de Arte/Contacto, Caracas.
- 1973, Museo de Bellas Artes, San Juan de Puerto Rico. Joyas, Galería de Arte/Contacto, Caracas.
- 1971, “Del Blanco al Negro” (Dibujos), Galería Track, Caracas.

== Group exhibitions ==
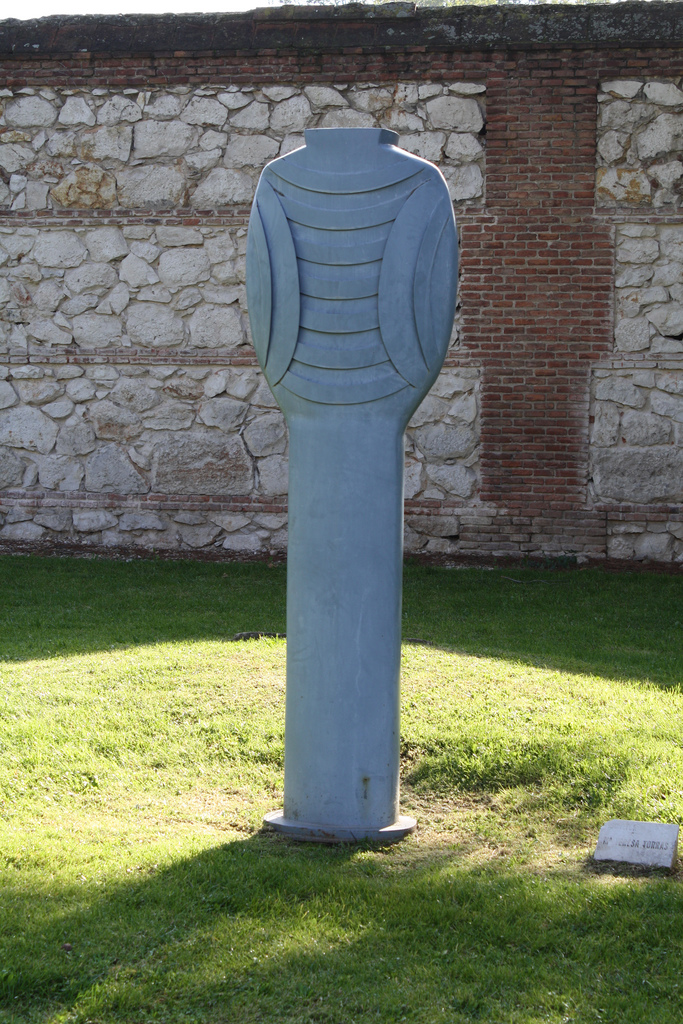
Museo de Escultura al Aire Libre de Alcalá de Henares (1993).

- 1983, II Salón Michoacano Internacional del Tapiz en Miniatura, Morelia, Michoacán, México.
- 1983, II Bienal Nacional de Artes Visuales. Museo de Arte Contemporáneo de Caracas Sofía Imber. Caracas, Venezuela.
- 1983, X Salón Nacional de las Artes del Fuego, Carabobo, Venezuela
- 1983, XLI Salón Arturo Michelena, Carabobo, Venezuela
- 1982, XL Salón Arturo Michelena, Ateneo de Valencia, Carabobo, Venezuela
- 1982, I Salón Nacional de Esculturas, Museo de Barquisimeto, Lara.
- 1981, 10e Biennale Internationale de la Tapisserie, Musée Cantonal des Beaux-Arts, Lausanne, Suiza.
- 1981, I Bienal de Arte Nacional, Caracas- Venezuela
- 1981, IV Trienal de Tapicería “Fiber Arts and Designers”, Museo Central de Textiles, Lódz, Polonia.
- 1978, “Tapices”, Maison de L’UNESCO, Paris, Francia.
- 1978, “Tapices”, Sala de la Gobernación del Distrito Federal, Caracas, Venezuela
- 1977, Salón de Orfebrería, Museo Boggio, Caracas, Venezuela
- 1977, “Tapices”, Crucero Cultural por el Caribe.
- 1976, IV Salón Nacional de Artes de Fuego, Carabobo, Venezuela
- 1976, I Salón de Orfebrería, Museo Casa del Correo del Orinoco, Bolívar, Venezuela
- 1975, “Tapices”, Universidad de Nebraska, Estados Unidos.
- 1975, Banco Central de Venezuela (Organizada por la UNESCO)
- 1974, “Joyas de Venezuela” (ONU), Caracas-Venezuela
- 1974, II Salón nacional de Artes de Fuego, Caracas-Venezuela
- 1974, “Arte Venezolano”, Museo de Arte Moderno, Lima, Perú.
- 1973, XXXI Salón Arturo Michelena, Ateneo de Valencia, Carabobo, Venezuela
- 1972, XXX Salón Arturo Michelena, Ateneo de Valencia, Carabobo, Venezuela
- 1972, Sala Mendoza, Caracas-Venezuela
- 1969, VII Salón de Arte Actual, Barcelona, España
- 1969, Salón Nacional de Dibujo, Museo de Bellas Artes, Caracas, Venezuela
- 1969, XXX Salón Oficial Anual de Arte Venezolano, Caracas.

== See also ==
- Museo de Escultura al Aire Libre de Alcalá de Henares
