= Menchu Gal =

Spanish-Basque painter

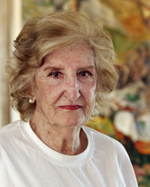
- Born: Carmen Gal Orendain; 7 January 1919; Irún, Guipúzcoa, Spain
- Died: 12 March 2008 (aged 89); San Sebastián, Guipúzcoa
- Other name: Mentxu Gal (in Basque)
- Education: San Fernando Academy of Fine Arts
- Occupation: Painter
- Known for: Landscapes

Carmen Gal Orendain, better known as Menchu Gal, (Irún, Guipúzcoa, 7 January 1919 – San Sebastián, Guipúzcoa, 12 March 2008) was a Spanish painter from the Basque Country. Her work in landscapes and portraits made her famous with her personal attraction to vivid colors. In 1959, she became the first woman to be awarded Spain's National Painting Prize.

== Biography ==
Carmen Gal Orendain was born into a wealthy and cultured family, and at the age of seven she began drawing classes with the painter Gaspar Montes Iturrioz (1901–1998). At the age of 13, she was selected for the IX Exhibition of New Guipuzcoan Artists, which was held at the Casino del Kursaal in the Basque city of San Sebastián.

In 1932, at 15, she traveled to Paris and enrolled in the academy of the Cubist painter Amédée Ozenfant. She spent a year there studying and visiting many exhibitions of Impressionist masters and Fauvists, and she was profoundly interested in the work of Henri Matisse.

In 1934 she arrived in Madrid and entered the San Fernando Academy of Fine Arts where Aurelio Arteta and Daniel Vázquez Díaz taught. She also received private classes from Marisa Roësset Velasco and lived in the Residence for Young Ladies that was directed by the educator and feminist María de Maeztu.

With the outbreak of the Spanish Civil War (1936–1939), Menchu Gal fled back to France, taking her family with her for safety.

In 1943, she returned to Madrid where Gutiérrez Solana put her in contact with Benjamín Palencia, Francisco San José, Rafael Zabaleta and Juan Manuel Díaz Caneja, thus entering the circle of landscape artists of the second Vallecas School (sometimes known as El Convivio) created by the Young Madrid School in 1946. Her paintings were dominated by color and vivid light.

In the last stage of her life, she lived in the Basque Country and promoted support for the younger generations of Basque painters.

She died in San Sebastián on 12 March 2008 at the age of 89.

Two years later, in January 2010, the Menchu Gal Exhibition Hall was opened in Irún, where works acquired by the city council in 2007 were exhibited.

== Works and exhibitions ==
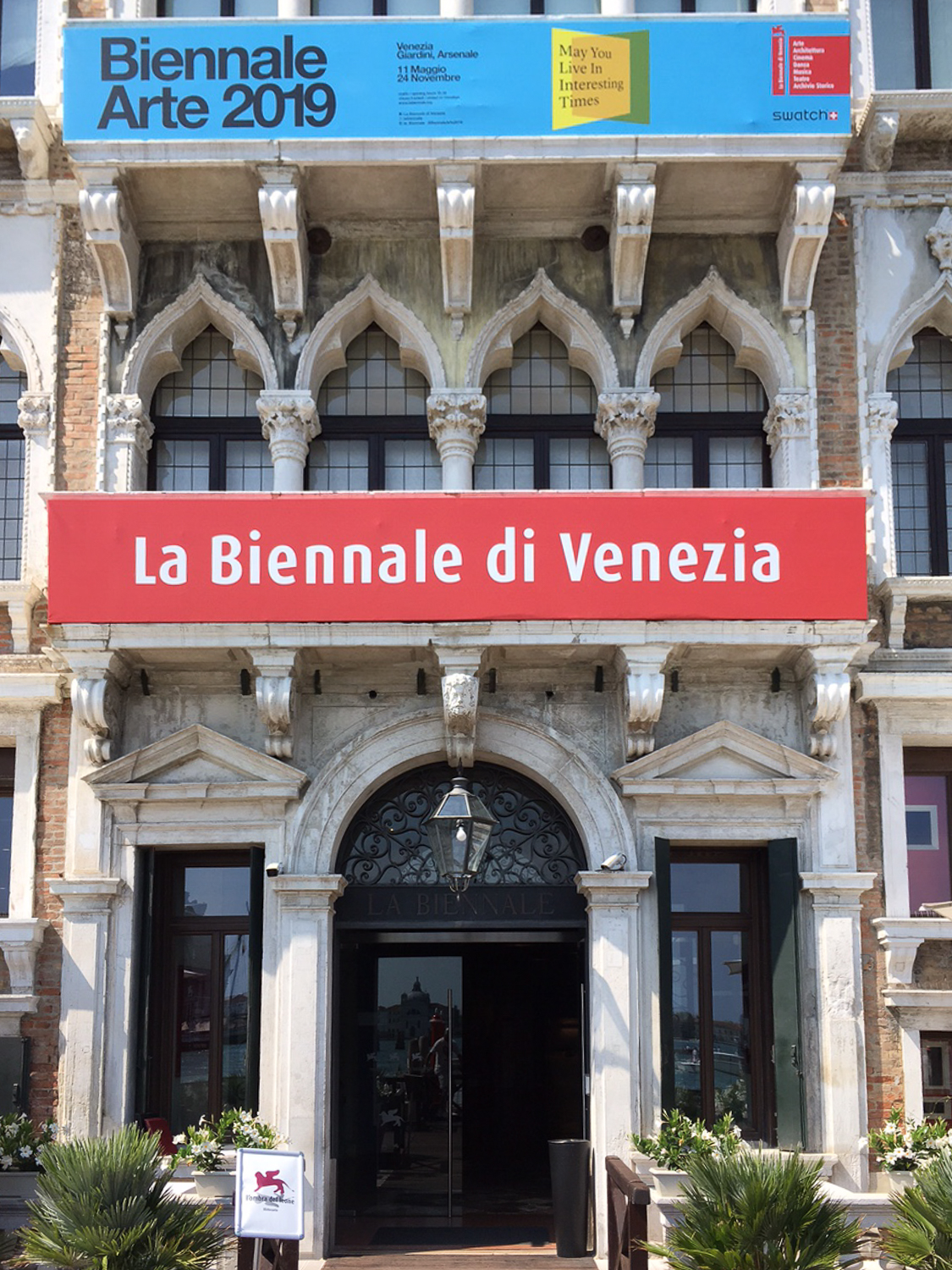
Three times, Menchu Gal's work was selected to represent Spain in the Venice Biennale exhibition.

During her 77 years as an artist, Menchu Gal participated in almost 70 solo exhibitions and 232 group exhibitions.

In 1942 she had her first solo exhibition in San Sebastián and in 1950 she had a solo exhibition at the National Museum of Modern Art in Madrid.

The landscapes of the Castilian plateau became a hallmark of her work, but she also produced portraits and still lifes, all in vivid color. Among her many exhibitions, the following stand out: Landscape in contemporary Spanish painting, presented by the Gulbenkian Foundation in Lisbon (1971); Women in Spanish art, at the Conde-Duque cultural center, and The School of Vallecas and a new perspective of the landscape, both in 1990.

She was chosen to represent Spain at the Venice Biennale in 1940, 1950 and 1956.

In 1986 the San Telmo Museum in Basque country organized its first anthological exhibition including her paintings.

Her works are exhibited in collections at the Bilbao Fine Arts Museum and the Reina Sofía Museum in Madrid.

In 2019 her work was part of the collective exhibition Drajantas, Pioneers of the Illustration at the ABC Museum of Drawing and Illustration in Madrid.

== Selected awards ==
- Spanish National Painting Prize (1959). First woman to receive this award for her work, A landscape of Arráyoz.
- Gold Medal of the Provincial Council of Guipúzcoa (2005). First woman to receive this award.
- Manuel Lekuona Award given annually by Eusko Ikaskuntza (2006)
- Gold Medal of the Irún City Council (2006)
