= Fina Rifà =

Drawing by Fina Rifà

Fina Rifà is a Catalan children's artist, illustrator, and educator from Barcelona, Catalonia, Spain. She began her career in 1963 with the illustration of the acclaimed children's book Chiribit by educator Marta Mata.

Over the course of her fifty-year career, Ms Rifà has illustrated over 200 titles. Her drawings have been exhibited in Europe and can be seen regularly at the Sala Rovira Gallery in Barcelona. Ms Rifà also designs logos, CD and record covers, posters and programs for cultural institutions and civic organizations and toys. Early in her career, she received the ADI-FAD (Industrial Design for Development of Decorative Arts Association) award for outstanding toy design.

Fina Rifà's illustrations regularly appear in children's magazines, including Cavall Fort and Tatano, where she serves on the editorial board. Ms Rifà provides teacher training at the ICE (Institute of Sciences of Education) at both the Universitat de Barcelona and Universitat Autònoma de Barcelona and also taught illustration at the Escola Professional de la Diputació de Barcelona (Professional School). Her articles on the subject of expression through illustration can be found in specialized trade journals throughout Spain.

Her professional associations include the Associació Professional d'Il·lustradors de Catalunya (Association of Professional Illustrators of Catalonia), where she has acted as both board president and vice president in addition to acting representative before the Catalan Council of Children's Books. She served on the board of directors of the Associació Catalana del Llibre Infantil i Juvenil (Catalan Association of Children's Books).
