= Carolina Ceca =

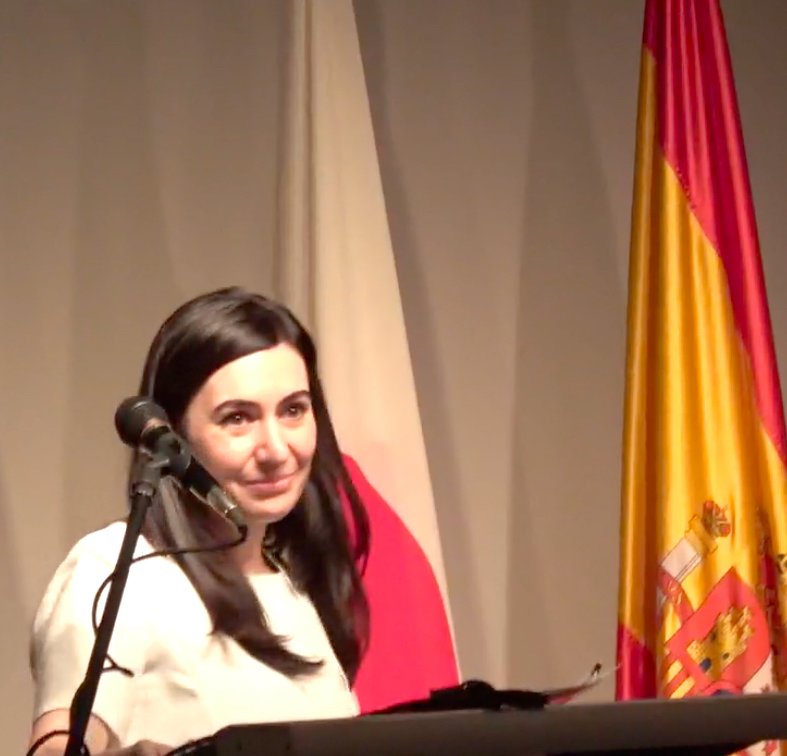
- Carolina Ceca at the Embassy of Spain in Tokyo, Japan 2016
- Born: August 25, 1979 (age 47); Talavera de la Reina, Toledo, Spain
- Education: University of Salamanca
- Occupation: Artist • art historian
- Website: http://www.carolinaceca.com/

Carolina Ceca FRSA (born August 25, 1979) is a Spanish artist, art historian and art writer based in Tokyo, Japan. She is a Fellow of the Royal Society of the Arts.

Her art has been presented in group and solo exhibitions throughout Europe and Japan. She has been featured on TV, radio, newspapers and magazines.

Ceca has a degree in Art History from the University of Salamanca in Spain, where she completed her postgraduate studies on Contemporary Art. Also, she commenced a degree in Fine Arts and Asian studies before travelling to Japan in 2005 to conduct several fields of research at Ferris University, Yokohama. Between 2005 and 2010, she worked and resided in Japan, Spain, Morocco and Italy.

In 2011, after the Tōhoku earthquake and tsunami, she returned to Tokyo, where she spends most of her time creating her artworks, writing, giving lectures and conducting seminars.

In her artworks, she uses numerous types of natural materials, including ashes, Japanese washi paper and organdy.

Ceca has confirmed that she was deeply influenced by Dondoro (Japanese performer) during her first year in Japan, also by the Japanese dance movement Ankoku Butoh.

== Selected exhibitions list ==
- 2019-2020: On Paper IV, MACC, Museo d’Arte Contemporanea, Calasetta, Italy.
- 2018: Continuum –International Art Book-, Royal Palace, Cagliari, Italy.
- 2016: Intangible, Cervantes Institute, Tokyo, Japan.
- 2014: Infinite, Embassy of Spain in Tokyo, Japan. This was the artist's first solo exhibition in Japan.
- 2010: Estampa International Contemporary Art Fair, Madrid, Spain.
- 2009: The Life of Bees, Santa Maria de Melque. Historic Site, Toledo, Spain.
