= Carme Solé Vendrell =

Spanish illustrator and writer (born c. 1944)

- Macarena Santos i Torres
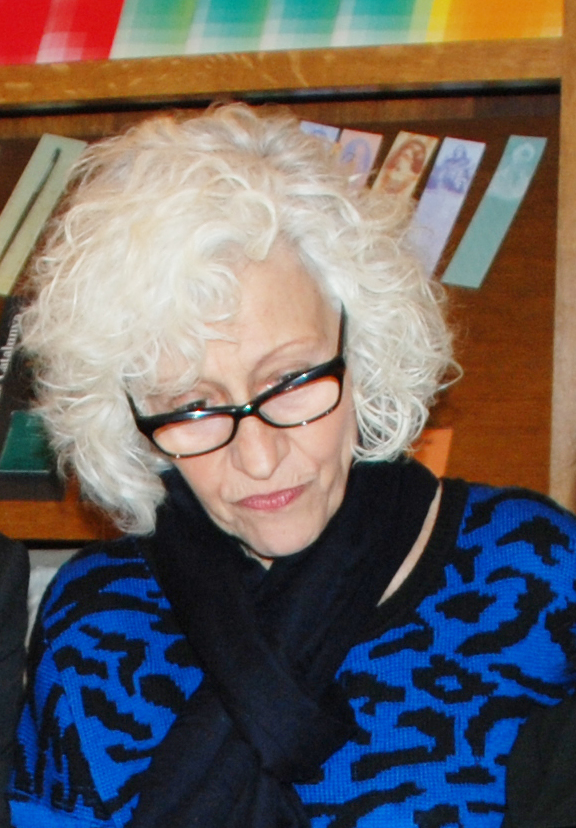
- Carme Solé (center) at National Library of Catalonia (2013)
- Born: 1944 (age 81–82); Barcelona
- Writing career
- Language: Spanish
- Genre: children's books
- Notable work: Premi Nacional de Cultura laureate

Carme Solé Vendrell (born 1944 in Barcelona) is a Spanish illustrator and writer, mainly of children's books. Since 1968, she has illustrated more than a hundred books. She has also worked on television series such as Víctor y María. She was a Premio Nacional de Cultura laureate in 1979 and 2012.

Between 2012 and 2015 her collection was deposited in the Biblioteca de Catalunya, consisting of about 400 drawings.

== Awards ==
- 1979: "Premio Nacional de Cultura"
- 1993: "Premi Crítica Serra d'Or de Literatura Infantil i Juvenil" for her illustrations in Brrrrrgg! by Jaume Escala
- 2006: Creu de Sant Jordi Award
- 2012: "Premi Nacional de Cultura"

== Selected works ==
- Raspall (1981)
- La lluna d'en Joan (1982)
- Jo les volia (1984)
- En Joan és molt petit (1990)
- Els nens del mar (1991)
- Magenta la petita fada (2003) ISBN 9788426437884, OCLC 432979296

=== Works in English ===
- Water Childrens Press Choice, 1984, ISBN 9780516086941, OCLC 16678079
- Sally's story London : Blackie, 1984. ISBN 9780216915756, OCLC 906462088

== Sources ==
- "Carme Solé Vendrell", by Jaime García Sobrino, in Nous voulons lire !, no. 104, June 1994, pp. 81–88
- "Carme Solé Vendrell", in CLIJ, no. 60, April 1994, pp. 25–26
- "Carme Solé i Vendrell" in Bookbird, no. 32-33, Autumn 1994, p. 48
