= María Teresa Martín-Vivaldi =

Spanish painter (born 1955)

- Born: 1955 (age 70–71); Granada, Spain
- Other name: María Teresa Martín-Vivaldi García-Trevijano
- Education: Complutense University of Madrid
- Occupation: Painter
- Years active: 1978–present
- Organization: Real Academia de Bellas Artes de Nuestra Señora de las Angustias
- Website: martinvivaldi.com

María Teresa Martín-Vivaldi García-Trevijano (born 1955) is a Spanish painter.

== Artistic career ==
María Teresa Martín-Vivaldi was born in Granada and earned her licentiate in political science and sociology, specializing in social anthropology, from the Complutense University of Madrid. Since 2017, she has been a member of the Real Academia de Bellas Artes de Nuestra Señora de las Angustias, for which she read the speech Un maestro añorado: Julio Espadafor.

After completing her university studies, she began to develop her career as an artist, beginning with studies of engraving with Julio Espadafor. She also received painting and modeling lessons from José Guerrero, Manuel Rivera Hernández, and Eduardo Carretero, among others. Her work is characterized by the abundant use of color and suggestion.

In 1978, she began to exhibit, and has participated in 40 solo and 56 collective exhibitions. Her work can be found in public and private collections such as the Museum of Hispanic Art in Miami and the Museo Picasso Málaga. She has exhibited at the Santiago Collado Art Space in Granada, at the Madrasah of Granada, at the Petleys gallery in London, at the Provinciaal Museum voor Moderne Kunst, and at the Caesarea Gallery in Florida.

In 1993, she won the Tesorillo fine arts prize. In 1995, she received the BMW Prize's medal of honor, for which she was also a finalist the following year. In 1999 she took second place in the Emilio Ollero painting competition. In 2000 she won the Jury Prize at the Galerie Artitude in Paris.

She works in serigraphs and lithographs, and makes covers and illustrations. In 2015 she designed the poster of the 65th edition of the Granada International Festival of Music and Dance.
