= Villanueva de los Caballeros =

Coordinates: 41°45′N 5°14′W

Villanueva de los Caballeros, Spain
- Coat of arms
- Interactive map of Villanueva de los Caballeros, Spain
- Country: Spain
- Autonomous community: Castile and León
- Province: Valladolid
- Municipality: Villanueva de los Caballeros

Area
  - Total: 35 km^{2} (14 sq mi)

Population (2025-01-01)
  - Total: 147
  - Density: 4.2/km^{2} (11/sq mi)
- Time zone: UTC+1 (CET)
  - Summer (DST): UTC+2 (CEST)

Villanueva de los Caballeros is a municipality in the Province of Valladolid, Castilla y León, Spain. As of 2004 census, the municipality had 246 inhabitants.

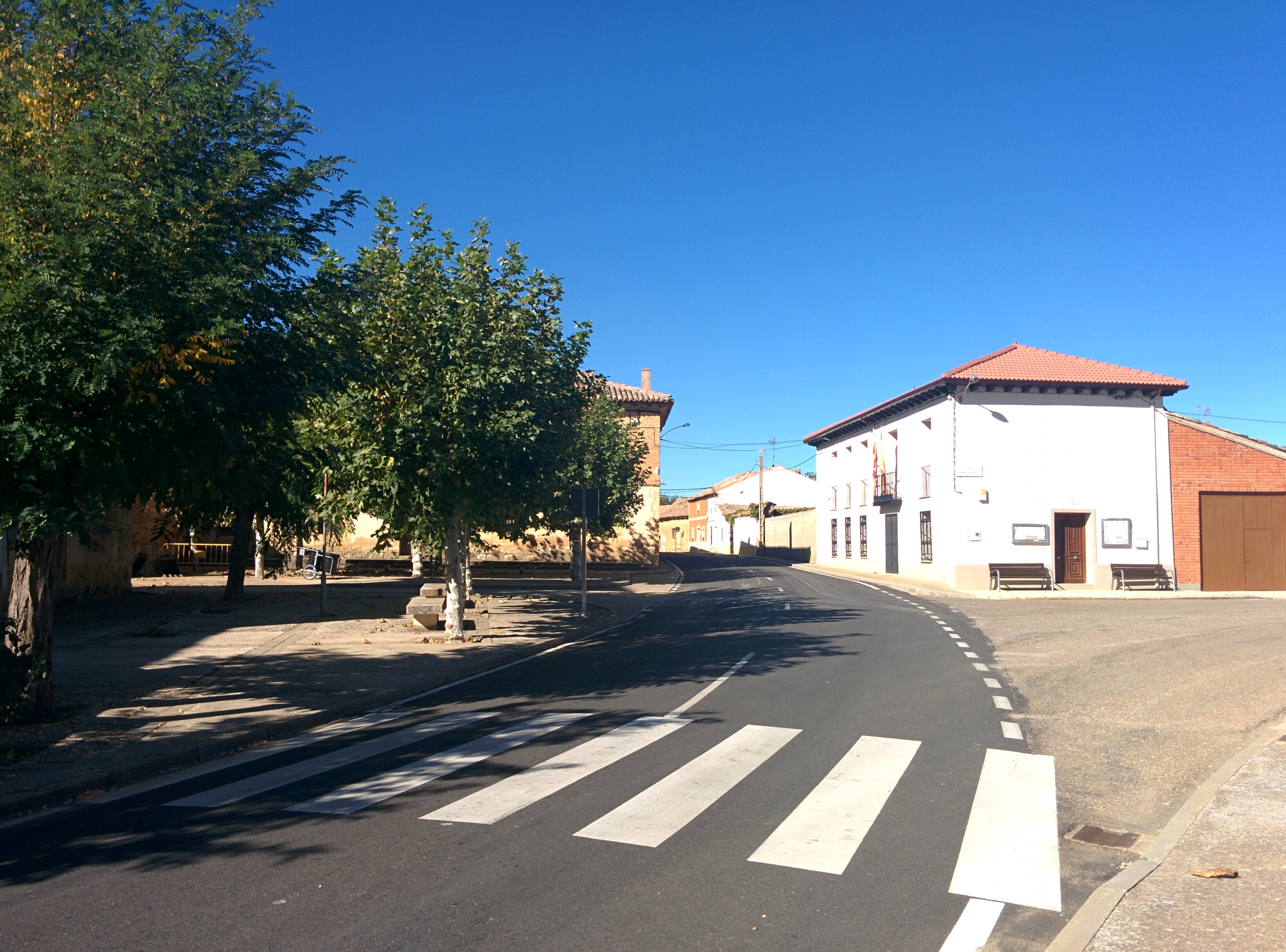
Local Council of Villanueva de los Caballeros
