= Lalalimola =

Spanish illustrator

- Sandra Navarro
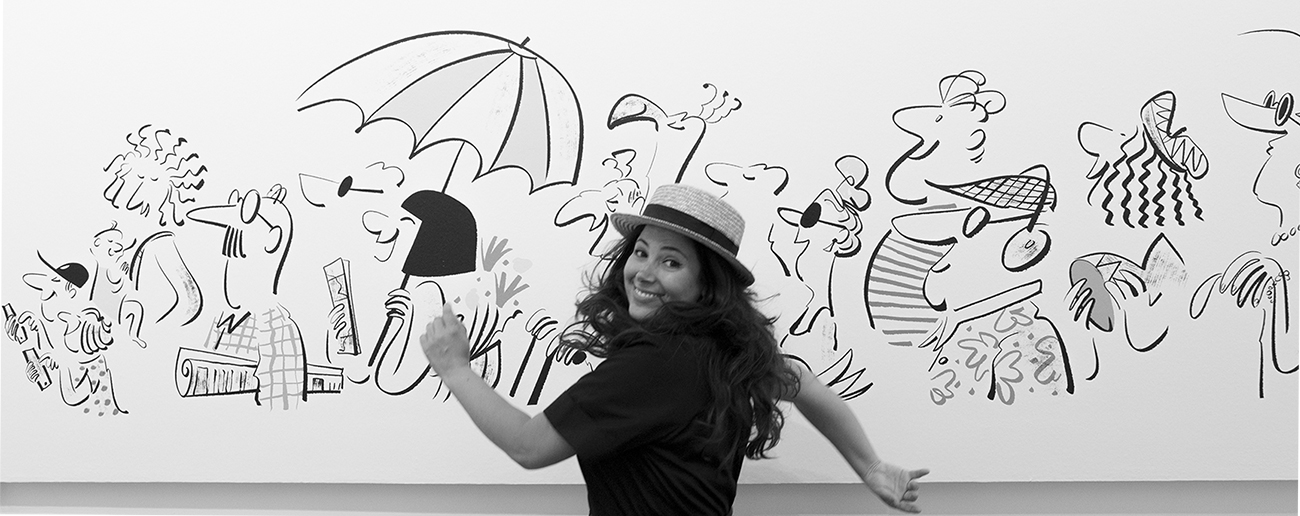
- Lalalimola, Barcelona 2018
- Born: 11 October 1984 (age 42); Valencia, Spain
- Education: Polytechnic University of Valencia, Jaume I University
- Known for: Illustration
- Style: Children's Literature Editorial Illustration
- Website: https://www.lalalimola.com

Lalalimola is the pseudonym of the Spanish illustrator Sandra Navarro (Valencia, 11 October 1984). She lives and works in Barcelona. Sandra has two Bachelor’s Degrees, one in Advertising at the Jaume I University (2002-2007) and one in Fine Arts at the Polytechnic University of Valencia (2007-2012). She worked as a graphic designer for five years until she decided to focus her career on illustration. Besides, she worked as a teacher at the Polytechnic University of Valencia in the Drawing Department of Fine Arts (2014-2015). In the early years of her career as illustrator, she worked mainly in the field of children's and young people's literature at the national and international levels. Later, her style was moving forward to the present day where Lalalimola’s work is primarily focused on editorial illustration. Her list of clients includes Penguin Random House, Simon & Schuster, Oxford University Press, APEX Experience Magazine, SZ Magazin, El País, Scoop Magazine, UNICEF, Specsavers, Barcelona City Council and more. Recently Sandra did the ad campaign for the 53rd Valencia Book Fair, a mural for the Sala Ciutat BCN, the official bookshop in Barcelona City Hall; and several covers for El País Newspaper.

== Publications ==
- Noodle Head, written by Giles Andreae, Penguin Random House, London, 2018.
- L’orso che non aveva mai voglia di fare nulla, written by Davide Cali, La Spiga Edizioni, Italy, 2018.
- Can You Tickle a Tiger's Tummy?, written by Sue Nicholson, QED Publishing, London, 2018.
- Can You Touch a Rainbow?, written by Sue Nicholson, QED Publishing, London, 2018.
- A Home for Gully, written by Jo Clegg, Oxford University Press, Oxford, 2017.
- ¿Quién hay dentro?, written by Mar Benegas, Combel, Barcelona, 2017.
- Vovô Gagà, written by Márcia Abreu, Editora Moderna, São Paulo, 2016.
- The Great Chocoplot, written by Chris Callaghan, Chicken House, Frome - Somerset, 2016.
- If Everything Were Pink, written by Hannah Eliot, Simon & Schuster, New York, 2015.
- If Everything Were Blue, written by Hannah Eliot, Simon & Schuster, New York, 2015.
- Le pondremos un bigote, written by Mar Benegas, Combel, Barcelona, 2015.

== Recognitions ==
- Critica Award Serra D'Or category Children’s Books 2018 (¿Quién hay dentro? written by Mar Benegas, Combel, Barcelona, 2018).
- Selected for The Bologna Children's Book Fair Illustrators 2016 (Vovô Gagà, written by Márcia Abreu, Editora Moderna, 2016).
- Selected for the V Catálogo IberoAmerica Ilustra 2014.
- ADCV Silver Award category Packaging 2009 (with Pixelarte Creatividad, 2009).
