= Buovo d'Antona (Traetta) =

Opera by Tommaso Traetta

Buovo d'Antona is an Italian-language dramma giocoso opera in three acts by Tommaso Traetta, on a libretto by Carlo Goldoni based on the Bevis of Hampton chivalric tale, which premiered at the Teatro San Moisè, Venice on 27 December 1758. The opera was well received and staged in Bologna, Turin, Verona, Palma, Barcelona, Seville and finally Dresden in 1772. Antonio Zatta's Venetian edition of Goldoni's plays (1788–95) gives "1750" as the date for a Florence premiere of the opera, but this is now thought to be a mistake.

== Plot ==
The plot is largely the same as the traditional Bevis of Hampton chivalric tale, but with dramatic alterations by Goldini. The basic story of the return to Antona from exile of the knight Buovo (tenor) to reclaim his estates and his beloved Drusiana (contralto) from the usurper Maccabruno (soprano en travesti) remains. Romantic conflict occurs in the wavering affections of Drusiana for her former lover and the usurper, and her new rival for the affections of Buovo in Menichina (soprano), a miller's daughter. Comic incidents occur around Buovo's friend Striglia (tenor), and his sweetheart the garden maid Cecchina (soprano), as well as interventions by Menichina's father the miller Capoccio (tenor). The plot concludes with Buovo reclaiming his estates, but marrying the miller's daughter while Drusiana is held to her earlier decision to be married to Maccabruno, despite Buovo having returned before the three years grace she originally required.

Traetta responded to the conventional division of heroic and comic characters in Goldoni's libretto with music suitable for opera seria for the noble couple, Buovo and Drusiana - then Buovo and Menichina, such as ABA da capo arias, and with more lightweight AABB arias for the non-noble couple, Striglia and Cecchina, and the other buffo roles.

== Recordings ==
- Buovo d'Antona Howard Crook (Buovo d'Antona); Daniela del Monaco (Menichina), Orchestra of the Teatro la Fenice, Venice Alan Curtis recorded 1993, 2 CDs, Opus 111
