= María Luisa Pérez Herrero =

Spanish painter

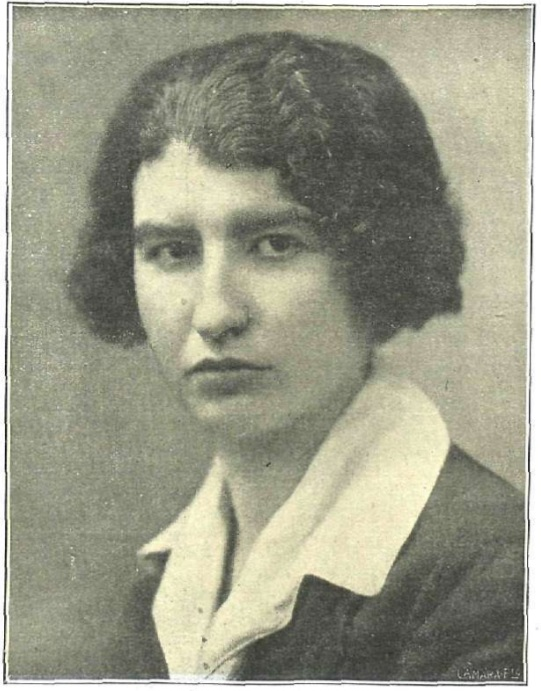
- Herrero in 1923
- Born: 12 April 1898; Madrid, Spain
- Died: 26 May 1934 (aged 36); Madrid, Spain
- Known for: Painting
- Style: Landscape

María Luisa Pérez Herrero (12 April 1898 – 26 May 1934) was a Spanish painter specializing in landscapes, whose artistic career was cut short by her early death at age 36.

== Biography ==
María Luisa Pérez Herrero studied at the Real Academia de Bellas Artes de San Fernando in Madrid and was a student of Antonio Muñoz Degrain. In 1919, she received a pension at the Monastery of El Paular. The following year, she exhibited at the First Autumn Salon of Independent Artists of Madrid, held at the Exhibition Center of the Parque del Buen Retiro.

Following the exhibition of her works in 1923, the Junta para Ampliación de Estudios e Investigaciones Científicas offered the artist a modest pension. After a banquet in her honor on 27 April of that year, she went to live in Paris and toured Belgium. A portion of her work, comprising landscapes of Paris and Bruges, was exhibited both on her return in Madrid and at the 6th edition of that city's Autumn Salon in 1925.

Landscapes of Bruges, Amsterdam, Versailles, Saint-Cloud, and the Jardin du Luxembourg were some of the paintings included in the 21 works exhibited in 1927 at the Lyceum Salon in Madrid and at the Friends of Art Salon of 1928. In 1929, after a three-week stay in Salamanca, she created 12 more works themed around the provincial capital, including La antigua calle del Arcediano en Salamanca (The Ancient Street of the Archdeacon in Salamanca).

== Recognitions ==
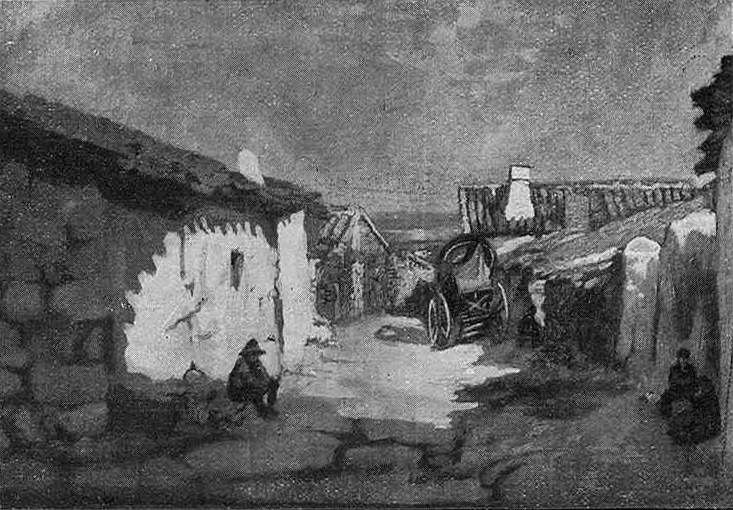
La Esfera, Calleja de Miraflores

In 1922, Pérez received the Third Medal at the National Exhibition of Fine Arts, a year in which she also exhibited a series of landscapes of Aranjuez and Miraflores at the Círculo de Bellas Artes in Madrid. At the proposal of the School of Fine Arts, she was given a pension in 1923 by the Junta para Ampliación de Estudios e Investigaciones Científicas. As a result of that trip she would receive an award three years later at the 1926 Exhibition of Cádiz.

At the 1934 National Exhibition of Fine Arts, by the order of 25 July at the proposal of the jury, her work Udiain was acquired for a value of 3,000 pesetas, in recognition of its merits and as a tribute to her memory. Her death, the result of a rapid illness, had occurred only a few hours before the opening of the event.

She lived at 10 Ataulfo Street in the Madrid district of Chamartín. This street is now named for her.
