= L'île de Merlin, ou Le monde renversé =

Opera by Christoph Willibald Gluck

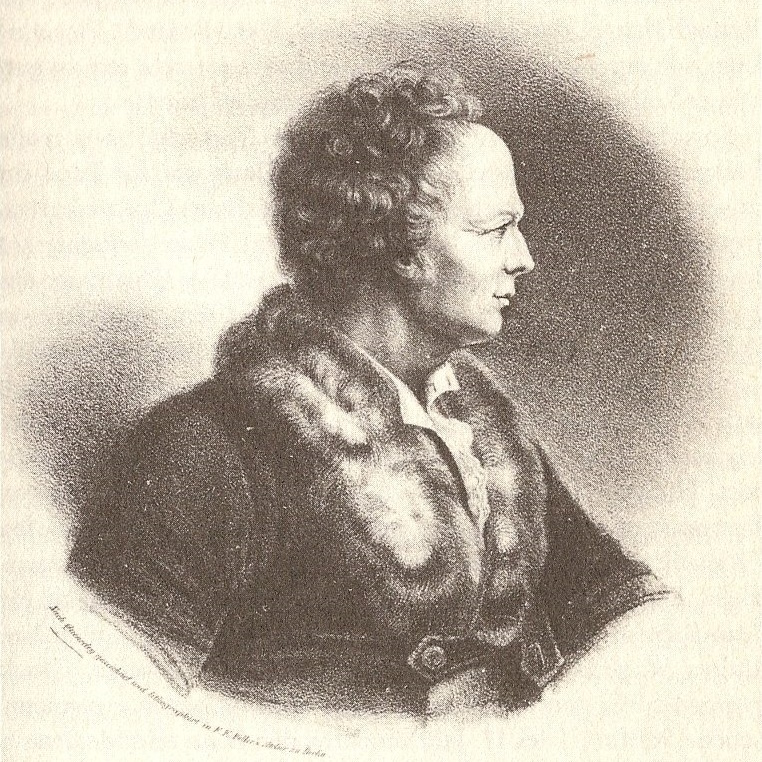
Portrait of Christoph Willibald Gluck, ca. 1750

L'île de Merlin, ou Le monde renversé (Merlin's Island, or the World Upended) is an opéra comique in one act composed by Christoph Willibald Gluck to a 1753 French libretto by Louis Anseaume based on Alain René Lesage and D'Orneval's 1718 vaudeville comedy Le monde renversé. Gluck's version was first performed on 3 October 1758 at the Schönbrunn Palace in Vienna.

== Roles ==
Role	Voice type	Premiere Cast, 3 October 1758
Merlin	tenor	
Argentine, Merlin's niece	soprano	
Diamantine, Merlin's niece	soprano	
Pierrot	bass	
Scapin	bass	
A philosopher	tenor	
M. de la Candeur, a dandy	tenor	
Hippocratine	soprano	
Chevalier de Catonville, a procurator	tenor	
M. Prud'homme, a notary	bass	
Hanif	tenor	
Zerbin	spoken role	
