= Dolores Gil de Pardo =

Spanish photographer (1842–1876)

Dolores Fausta Dorotea Gil Pérez (1842 in Almonacid de la Sierra – 22 September 1876 in Zaragoza) was a Spanish photographer, recognised as a pioneer in the field in Catalonia and Aragon.
