= Josep Gallés i Salabert =

Catalan composer and organist

Josep Gallés i Salabert (Castellterçol 1758 - Vic 1836) was a Catalan composer and organist. His best known compositions are the 23 sonatas for keyboard. Relatively little is known and been documented about this musician. As a young child he was first exposed to notions of music from his parish organist, and at age sixteen in 1774 he journeyed to Barcelona to study under masters Ramon Sunyer, Joan Vila and Anton Mestres.

In 1777, at the age of nineteen, he passed his public examinations, winning a place as organist at Vic Cathedral, a position he held until his death. He was never ordained as a priest but maintained his rank as Deacon. Towards the end of his life the musician and composer Bernat Calvó Puig i Capdevila (1818–1880) became a disciple. Unfortunately, the majority of Gallés' written works were lost in a fire at the cathedral in 1936. He died in Vic on 24 December 1836 at the age of 78.
