= Cristina Martín Lara =

Spanish photographer (born 1972)

Cristina Martín Lara (born 1972) is a Spanish photographer who lives and works in Berlin. Her photographs seek to trigger emotional responses to the environment in which we live.

== Biography ==
Lara was born in Málaga in 1972. She first studied medicine at the University of Málaga, then turned to fine arts at Granada's Alonso Cano University, graduating in 1992. She has participated in numerous exhibitions. Her Landpartie series tests our emotional responses to the environment in which we live.

== Exhibitions ==
Recent solo exhibitions include:

- 2004 Si yo supiera a qué se debe..Wenn ich wüsste woran das liegt…(1). Galería JM. Málaga. Si yo supiera a qué se debe…Wenn ich nur wüsste woran das liegt…(0). Open Art München. Kiosk-Kanzler.
- 2005 Si yo supiera a qué se debe…Wenn ich nur wüsste woran das liegt…(1). Galería Fúcares. Madrid.
- 2005 Si yo supiera a qué se debe…Wenn ich nur wüsste woran das liegt…(1). Video. Espacio 5. CacMálaga.
- 2006 Si yo supiera a qué se debe…Wenn ich nur wüsste woran das liegt…(4). Sala B. Palacio de los Condes de Gabia. Granada.
- 2008 Landpartie I. Galería Cámara Oscura. Festival Off PHE 08. Madrid.
- 2009 Landpartie. Galería Isabel Hurley. Málaga.

== Literature ==
- Martín Lara, Cristina (2010). Soy sombra de cosa soñada (in Spanish). Fundación Pablo Ruíz Picasso. ISBN 978-84-614-1240-2.
- Martín Lara, Cristina (2000). Onirogramas: relatos de sueños : Salas del Centro Cultural Provincial, 28 de enero/11 de febrero/2000 (in Spanish). Diputación Provincial de Málaga, Área de Cultura y Educación.
