= Amalia López Cabrera =

Spanish photographer (1837–c. 1899)

Amalia López Cabrera (Almería, 1837 – Madrid, c. 1899) was a daguerreotypist and professional Spanish photographer. She was the first woman opening her own photographic studio in Spain.

== Life ==
=== Early life and study ===
She was born in a wealthy merchant family and she lived her childhood in Almería, on Posada street, near Francisco Javier de León Bendicho’s Lyceum. In her early twenties, she met her future husband, Mr. Ludwik Tarszela Ski Konarzenski, the Count of Lipa. He had been a captain in the Polish army, but he was living as an expatriate in France at the time.

There, he became a close friend of the famous Louis Daguerre, universally considered the father of photography. Daguerre initiated him into the secrets of photochemistry and, furthermore, unveiled to his eyes the mysteries for the correct placement of the subjects, something critical at those times, when they needed to stay motionless for very prolonged periods of time in order to achieve a correct exposition.

The Count of Lipa opened his own photographic studio in Jaen, and when young Amalia noticed it, she quickly enrolled there and so became his first pupil. She wanted to learn the mysterious world of the daguerreotype plates, how to make the silver solutions and, moreover, she desired to master the times of exposure.

During the time Amalia stayed at the studio, she was also practicing the techniques of taking pictures of dead people. That was a photographic modality that was at its peak of popularity by the time.

=== Studio work ===
In 1860, when she had already learned the techniques of photography, she decided to open her own studio. By the time, there were some photographic studios where there were already women working. However, they did it only as assistants, generally of their husbands. In the case of Amalia, the particular feature was that she ran the business. The studio was located in 2, Obispo Arquellada street, near her husband’s printing workshop.

She published a lot of advertisements in the newspapers with the following words: “Amalia L. De López: pictures in general, group pictures, views and landscapes; the photographs are taken even at cloudy days; nearly instantaneous times of exposure. We only hand our work after customer satisfaction”.

Amalia took pictures of children wearing adult clothes, even including cigarettes and hats. She also took photographs of corpses, the traditional post-mortem pictures that served as a remembrance, which were very common at the time. In addition, she published postcards of paintings by Bartolomé Esteban Murillo and by Rafael Sanzio. She also published a lot of views of the Jaén Cathedral as well as reproductions of religious images. Obviously, a significant part of her production was composed of pictures of distinguished personalities of the time.

Eventually, her effort was recognized when she submitted her work to the National Photography Award of Zaragoza, held in 1868. She entered the contest and obtained an honorary mention.

Afterwards, the couple went to Madrid when Amalia’s husband was appointed to print “La Gaceta Agrícola”, a newspaper of the time. Consequently, Amalia took the difficult decision of closing her studio in Jaen 8 years after its opening.

After their arrival in Madrid their trace vanishes and it is not known how the rest of her life developed. It does not seem that Amalia resumed her photography career in Madrid and there is no information in this sense. Nowadays, the date of her death is still unknown. Instead, it is only known that her husband died in 1899.
