= Jil Love =

Spanish artist and activist

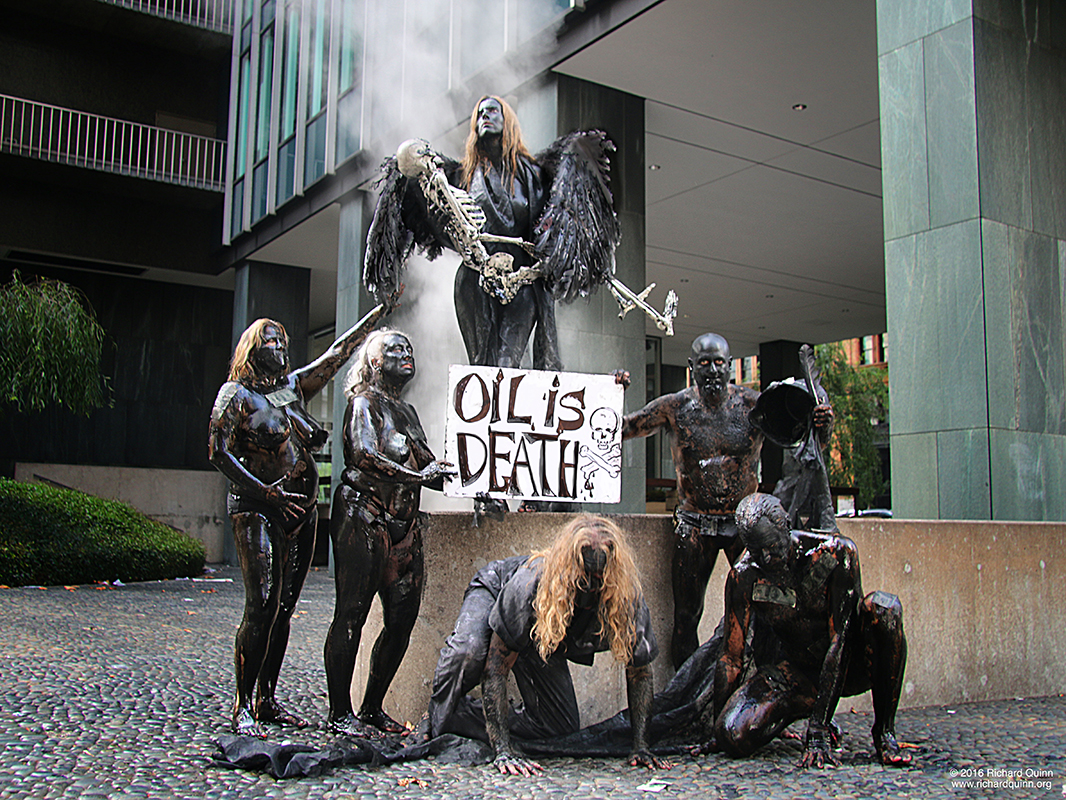
- A Jil Love artivism performance raising awareness about oil.
- Born: Jordina Salabert; Tarragona, Spain
- Years active: 2012–present
- Website: jilloverevolution.com

Jordina Salabert, better known by her stage name, Jil Love, is an artist and activist (artivist) whose work features public performance art and demonstration to create public awareness of human rights, the environment, animal rights, and LGBT rights. Her work involves performance art and artistic passive resistance in public spaces using the human body, sometimes using nudity.

== Early life ==
Jordina Salabert was born in Tarragona, Spain and went to Barcelona at age 16 to pursue film studies. Love later worked in Madrid as a performer and public relations manager for a prominent night club. After drawing the attention of talent agencies and photographers, she appeared on television and in films, as an actress and model.

== Career ==
Love first came into the international spotlight in September 2012, as tensions between protesters and police rose during demonstrations outside a Spanish congressional summit. Love took off her clothing and began praying in the street. Photographs of her action spread around the world on the Internet, as well as in print media. In 2014, Love appeared with hands and feet bound, with a suffocating plastic bag over her head, and a placard translating to "I am Catalonia" outside Spanish Parliament. The photo was featured in The Wall Street Journal's Year in Photos 2014 compilation, featuring culturally significant photos from around the globe. In September 2014, Love covered herself in duct tape like a mummy and was written on by others, protesting the Spanish gag law. An outspoken opponent of animal cruelty, in September 2014, Love covered herself in fake blood to protest bullfighting in Spain.

In March 2015, Love was body painted with the names of forty-three missing Mexican students at the Mexican consulate in Los Angeles. Love is the founder of the social movement Jil Love Revolution, which has received attention globally. According to Love, "The mission of Jil Love Revolution is to awaken a force in those who view our images…to raise awareness, ignite ideas and incite people to action."

In early 2014, Scottish energy company Cairn Energy came under intense criticism from numerous organizations and celebrities surrounding the company's proposals to explore oil drilling in the Gulf of Valencia, off the coast of Ibiza. Love organized demonstrations in Madrid and in Ibiza, featuring herself and other activists covered head to toe in fake oil. Her artistic performance in Ibiza was featured widely by various international press, including Diario de Ibiza and Metro in the UK.

== Published works ==
- "We Are The Voices Of The Unheard", self-published on December 1, 2015
