= Eulalia Abaitua Allende-Salazar =

Eulalia de Abaitua y Allende-Salazar
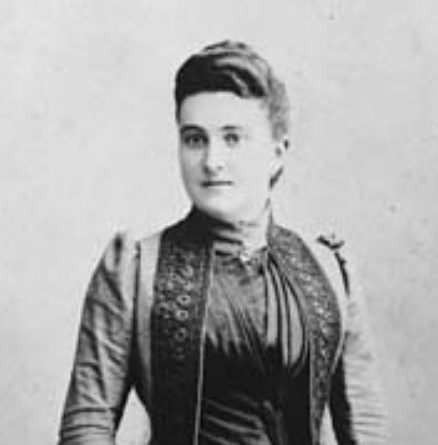
- Born: 25 January 1853; Bilbao
- Died: 16 September 1943 (aged 90); Bilbao
- Education: Sagrado Corazón de Jesús school
- Occupations: parent & photographer
- Children: three

Eulalia de Abaitua y Allende-Salazar or Eulalia Abaitua (25 January 1853 – 16 September 1943) lived in Barcelona, Liverpool and London before becoming an early Spanish photographer based in the Basque port of Bilbao. Her work is now a resource of early Basque culture.

== Life ==
Allende-Salazar was born in Bilbao in 1853. Shortly after her birth her mother died and she adopted her name. She and her two siblings were split up and she was the only one to remain in the care of her father. He arranged for her to attend a school near Barcelona called Sagrado Corazón de Jesús. Her father was a lawyer who worked in her family's business which had offices in Liverpool and Bilbao.

== Britain ==
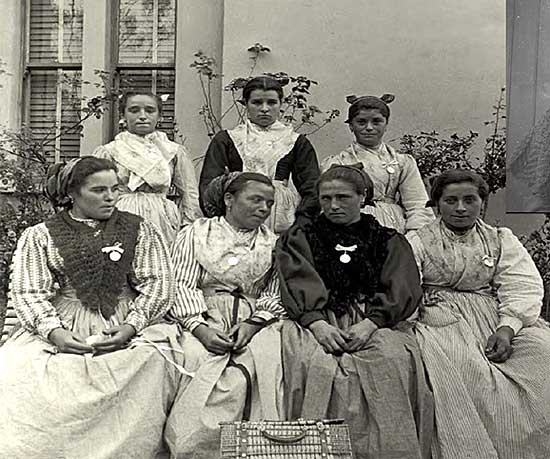
A group taken in Spain

In the 1860s her father moved to Everton near Liverpool where he lived in Shaw Street with other expatriate Spaniards. She found out about photography in Liverpool which she adopted as her passion in Bilbao after she had married. She married her cousin on 16 May 1871 at the St Francis Xavier Church in Liverpool. On the same day her brother married his cousin who was her new husband's sister. The cousin's were close as by 1874 the four of them were living in London where Eulalia gave birth to their son, Luis Maria de Olano, in 1876.

== Bilbao ==
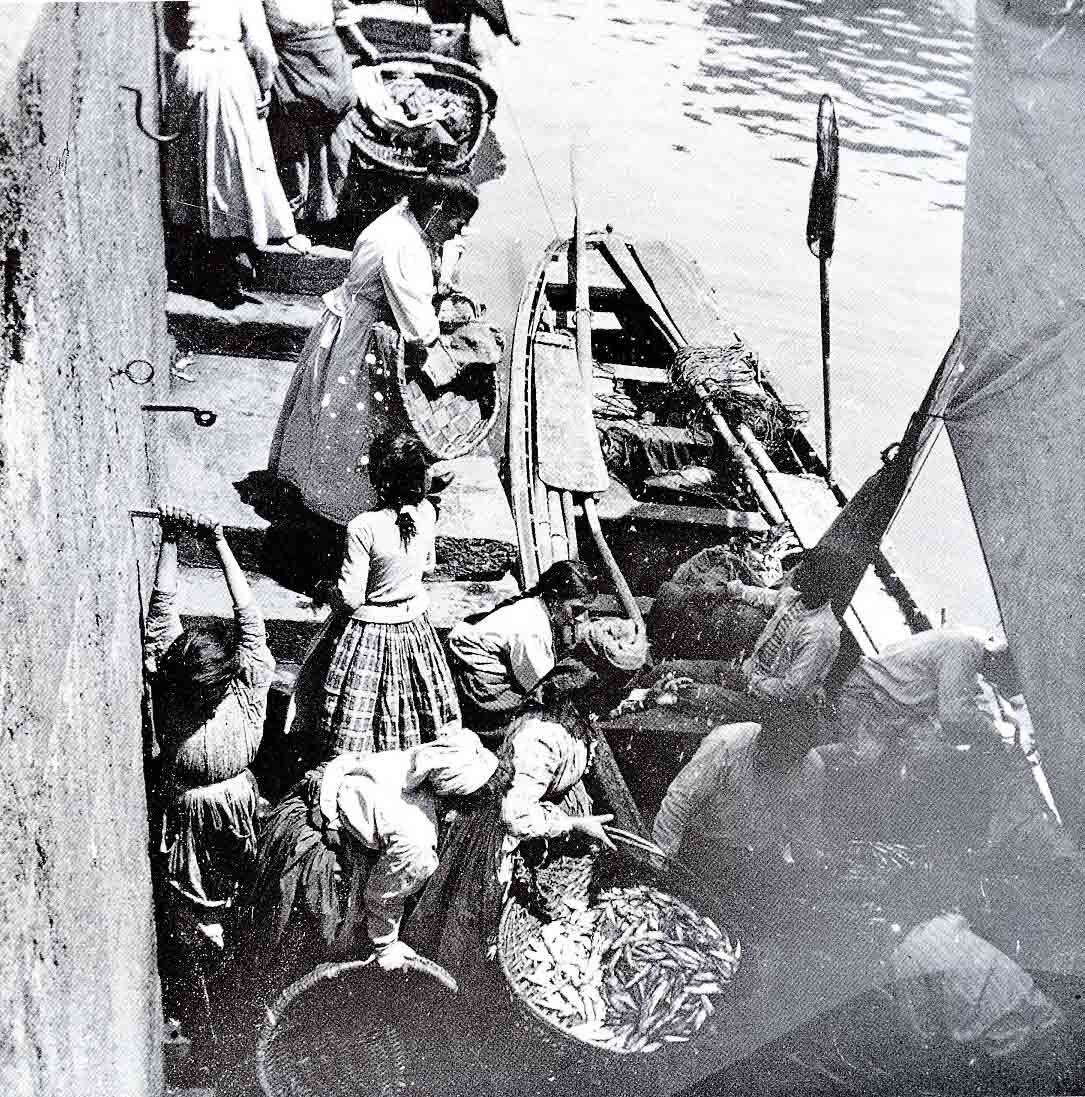
"Arrival of the Sardines"

Eulalia and her husband, Juan Narciso de Olano 'Cum dispens, returned to Spain where Eulalia spent the rest of her life. She had four children and also spent her time taking photographs of sardines being sold, sailors, celebrations as well as women carrying water or washing clothes in the river. She used glass plates that were 4.5 x 10.7 cm and she used stereoscopic exposures. It is said that today her style would see her recognised as a leading photo journalist. As expected she recorded her family including her grandchildren as well as recording local sights. However she also travelled and she took pictures in Crete, Italy, Venice, Morocco, Lourdes in France, Malaga, Madrid and Israel.

Allende-Salazar died in Bilbao in 1943. There are 2,500 of her images in the Basque Museum in Bilbao.
