= Alejandrina Gessler y Lacroix =

Spanish artist (1831–1907)

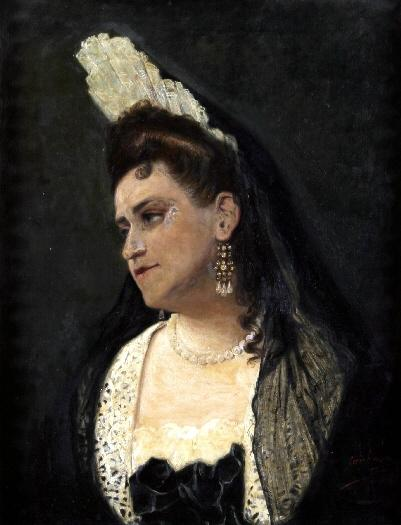
- Cézar Álvarez Dumont, Portrait of Alejandrina Gessler y Lacroix Museum of Cádiz
- Born: Alejandrina Gessler y Shaw; April 21, 1831; Cádiz, Spain
- Died: 1907
- Education: Paris
- Known for: painting

Alejandrina Gessler y Lacroix (1831–1907), born Alejandrina Gessler y Shaw, was a Paris-trained Spanish painter who exhibited regularly at the Paris Salon and was among the first female artists to be accepted into Madrid's Real Academia de Bellas Artes de San Fernando and Cádiz's Academia de Bellas Artes.

== Life and career ==
Born of a Russian father and a Scotch-Irish mother, Gessler y Lacroix married French real estate developer Charles Lacroix and accompanied her husband to Paris in 1853. She trained at Charles Chaplin's atelier alongside Mary Cassatt and Eva Gonzalès and exhibited at the Paris Salon almost annually from 1865 to 1885, in addition to painting on commission for various hotels, churches, and mansions. She is also known for her female nudes and for her Orientalist paintings, inspired by travels in North Africa. She returned to Spain following her husband's death in 1895 and contained her artistic and literary output. Gessler y Lacroix worked under several pseudonyms, including Madame Anselma and Marie Lacroix, and published her memoirs, Recuerdos de Cádiz y Puerto Real (1841-1850), in 1899 as Fulana de Tal.
