= Nath-Sakura =

Catalan-Spanish photographer

- Born: November 21, 1973 (age 52); Girona, Catalonia; Spain
- Occupations: fine art photography journalist

Nathalie Balsan-Duverneuil, a.k.a. Nath-Sakura (born November 21, 1973, in Girona) is a Catalan-Spanish photographer. She is of unknown parentage and was raised in an orphanage. She became a photographer because "she couldn’t paint", as she explained to Art Nou, the Catalan art magazine.

== Biography ==
Nath-Sakura graduated with a PhD in Philosophy from the University of Montpellier. She then took up a career as a professional reporter. Her identity as a trans woman plays a large role in her work, which often narrates her own transition and those of others. Her work is mostly about the "movement between genders and aims to show with great subtlety the 'metaphysical brutality' in being born again."

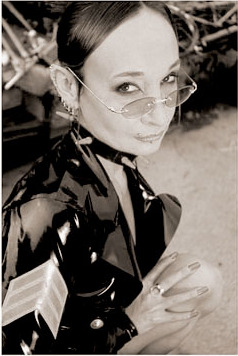
Photo, par Nath-Sakura, de Laïka de N.

She now lives in the south of France, near Montpellier, and works for many non-specialized daily and weekly newspapers as a photo reporter. To date she has published five photography books and appeared in many exhibitions. She is one of the associated artists of the Bertold Foundation in Lugano, Switzerland and is both a photo reporter and an art photographer.

== Exhibitions ==
=== 2004 ===
- Museu d'Art Contemporani Art de Barcelona, Catalonia, Spain
- II Prague, Czech Republic.
- Reporting from Gaza, Palestine, children of mixed couples (Israelis / Palestinians).

=== 2005 ===
- Exhibition "Art in prison," Villeneuve-les-Maguelone.
- Exhibition in the Saint-Sulpice church, Montpellier, France.
- Prize winner of the photojournalism festival in Melbourne, Australia.

=== 2006 ===
- Photographic artbook "Powers" (Map editor).
- Exhibition at the Tavern of Chaos, Paris, France.
- Gallery Albertini, Dijon, France. Exhibition and artist associated with Bertold Foundation, Lugano, Switzerland.
- Gallery Què Pasa, Vigo, Spain.
- Gallery W & V, Berlin, Germany.

=== 2007 ===
- Photographic Collection "duality" (LDP editor).
- Tarot of Eve and / Tarot nathcsf2007.jpg Lilith, exposed in Alet-les-Bains and Marseille, France.
- Vauban National Exhibition, National Maritime Museum in Toulon, France. Fort de Balaguier Museum exhibition - La Seyne-sur-Mer.
- Arte Lisboa, Lisbon, Portugal.

=== 2008 ===
- Exhibition "Contradictory", Le Divan du Monde, Paris, France.
- Photographic collection "Pervy Obsessions" (Ragage).
- Exhibition Tate Gallery, Liverpool, United Kingdom.
- Restaurant Sketch Exhibition, London, United Kingdom.
- Exhibition at Teatro Fernán Gómez, Plaza de Colón, Madrid.

=== 2009 ===
- Reports and photographic illustrations "A woman, two men, three eyes (Ragage editor).
- Panelist Assises du Corps Transformé (Assizes of the Body Transformed), Faculty of Law of Montpellier.
- Exhibition "To finish once and for all with photography,"
- In my gallery, your home, Nîmes, France.

=== 2010 ===
- Exhibition "Everything Lust go" Backstage Gallery, Marseille, France.

=== 2011 ===
- Exhibition "Ergo sum", The Showcase Gallery, Arles, France (February).
- Exhibition "icon (s) vs Lilith Eve," MUSEAAV, Nice, France (March).
- Exhibition "Between them," Concord Art Gallery, Paris, France (April).
- Sponsor of the Festival "313730.php Supernova" in Montpellier, France (May).
- Exhibition "Res Cogitans" in Chai du Terral Saint-Jean-de-Vedas (Hérault) in May.
- Gallery Hoche, Versailles, France, June.

=== 2013 ===
- Exhibition Corpus Delicti
- lecture on her photojournalism work
- International Exhibition of Photography of Riedisheim (France)

=== 2013 ===
- Exhibition "Corpus Delicti"
- Conference on his photo-journalism work at the Salon international de la photographie de Riedisheim

=== 2014 ===
- Exhibition in Hollywood at the Artist's Corner Gallery & Bookmaking in the 23° PhotoLA (Los Angeles).
- Exhibition in Hong-Kong, in the Asia Contemporary Art Show by Paris Art Limited gallery.
- Exhibition in Rennes (France), at the Eleven gallery

=== 2015 ===
- Lecturer at the International meetings on professional photography in Montpellier (France)

== Bibliography ==
- Pouvoirs, (Powers), éditions Map, 2005
- Dualités, (Dualities), LP, 2006
- Vauban à Toulon, l'arsenal et la rade, (Vauban in Toulon, the Arsenal and the Harbor), Musée national de la marine, 2007
- Pervy Obsessions, photographic collection, preamble by Robert Chouraqui, Thomas Ragage editpr, Neuilly, 2008
- 1 femme, 2 hommes, 3 regards, (One Woman, Two Men, Three Looks), with Fabrizio Pasini and Nalair, preamble by Patrick Wecksteen, Thomas Ragage editor, Neuilly 2009
- Fatales, (Fatal), texts by Jean-Paul Gavard-Perret, preamble by Christophe Mourthé, Victoria Editions, Montpellier, 2012
- Eternelles, (Eternal), texts by Eugène Durif, Victoria Editions, Montpellier, 2014
