= Museo de Bellas Artes de Córdoba =

Fine Arts Museum of Córdoba
- Museo de Bellas Artes de Córdoba
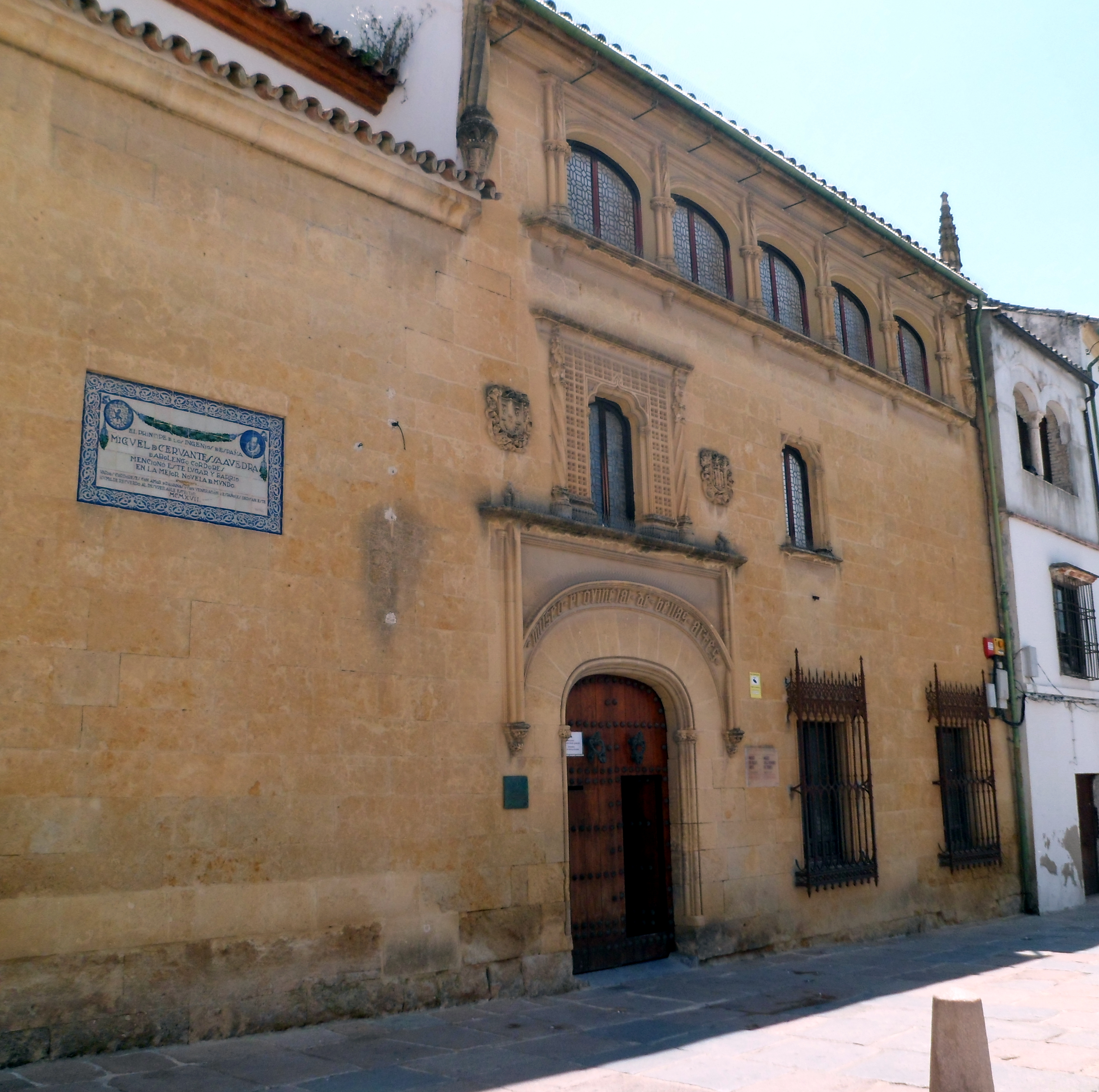
- Museum's facade
- Established: 1844
- Location: Córdoba, Spain
- Coordinates: 37°52′53″N 4°46′29″W
- Type: Art museum
- Owner: General State Administration

The Fine Arts Museum of Córdoba (Spanish: Museo de Bellas Artes de Córdoba) is a State-owned art museum located in the Spanish city of Córdoba.

== History ==
Similarly to most art museums in Spain, its creation ensued after the 1835 desamortización. The museum was thus created in 1844, and, directed by Diego Monroy Aguilera, it was installed in the former premises of the provincial deputation. Given some issues stemming from the inadequacy of the facilities, the museum was moved to the Hospital de la Caridad in 1862, although issues lingered as the museum shared the building with other institutions.

A section of Modern Art was created in 1902.

The management of the museum was transferred to the Junta of Andalusia in 1984 (the Spanish State remained as owner).

== Collection ==
Items hosted by the museum include works by Pedro Romana, Pedro de Campaña, Alejo Fernández, Pablo de Céspedes, Juan de Peñalosa, José de Ribera, Antonio del Castillo, Antonio García Reinoso, Valdés Leal, Juan de Alfaro, Juan de Mesa, Antonio Palomonio, José Ignacio Cobo y Guzmán, Verdiguier, Rafael Romero Barros, Rafael Romero de Torres, Julio Romero de Torres, Ricardo Baroja and Mateo Inurria. While largely focused on the Cordobese art since the 14th century onward, the museum also features works by Zuloaga, Gutiérrez Solana, Vázquez Díaz, Tàpies, Chillida, Canogar and Saura.

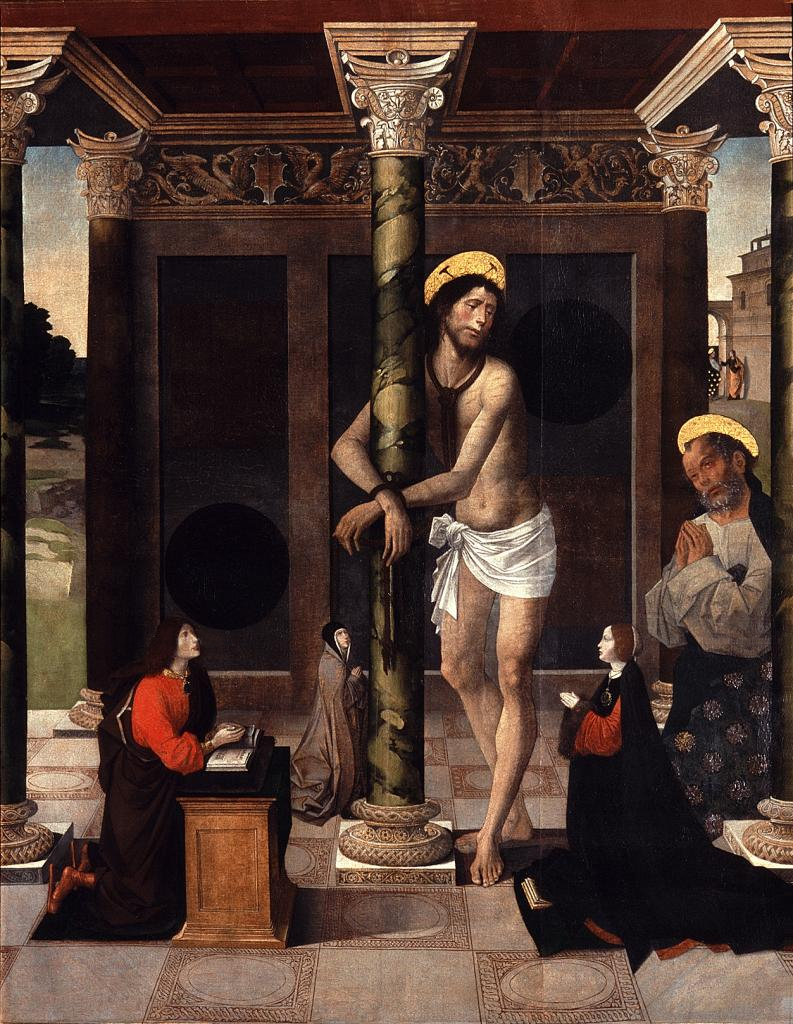
Cristo atado a la columna con San Pedro y donantes by Alejo Fernández

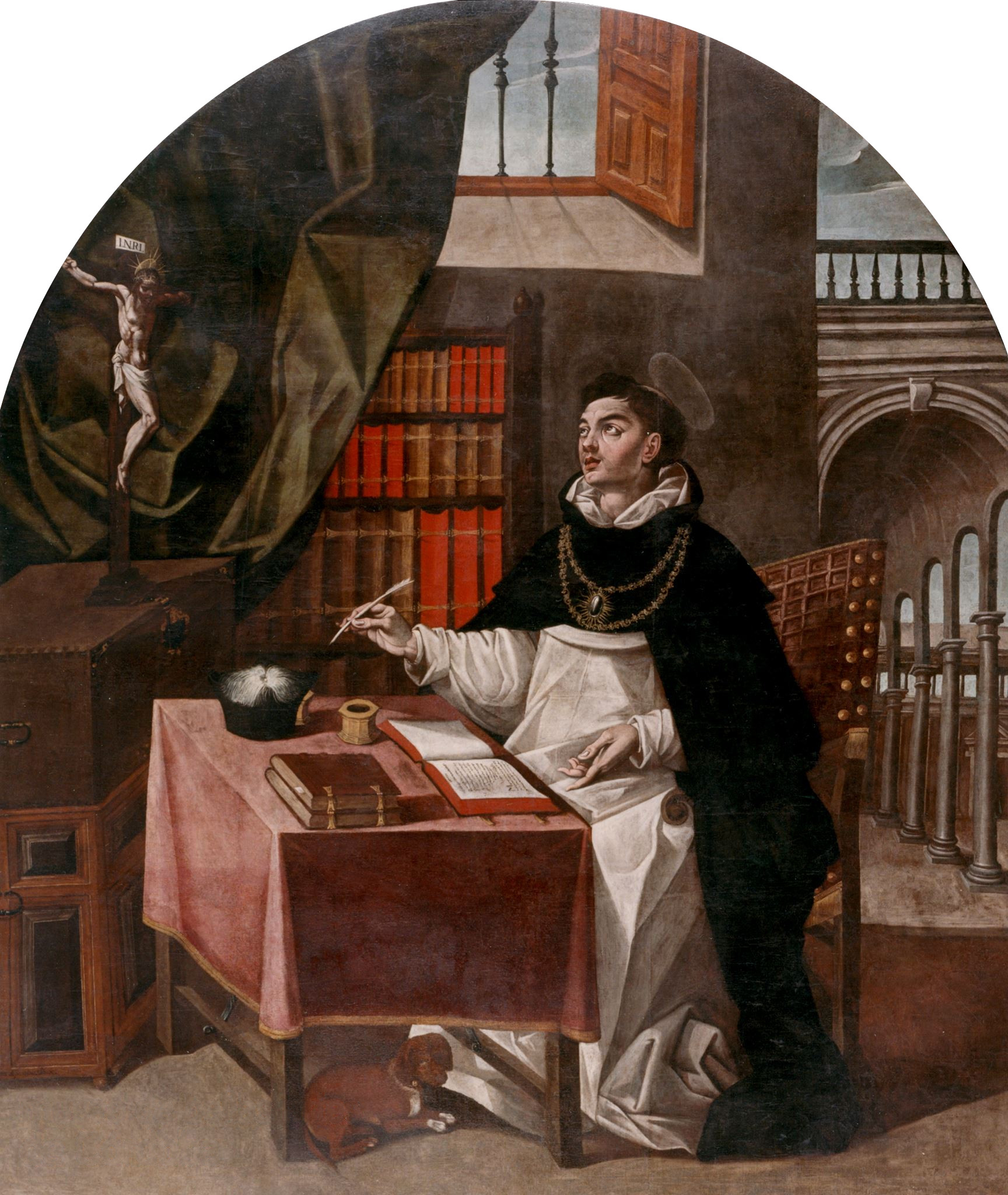
Santo Tomás de Aquino by Juan de Peñalosa

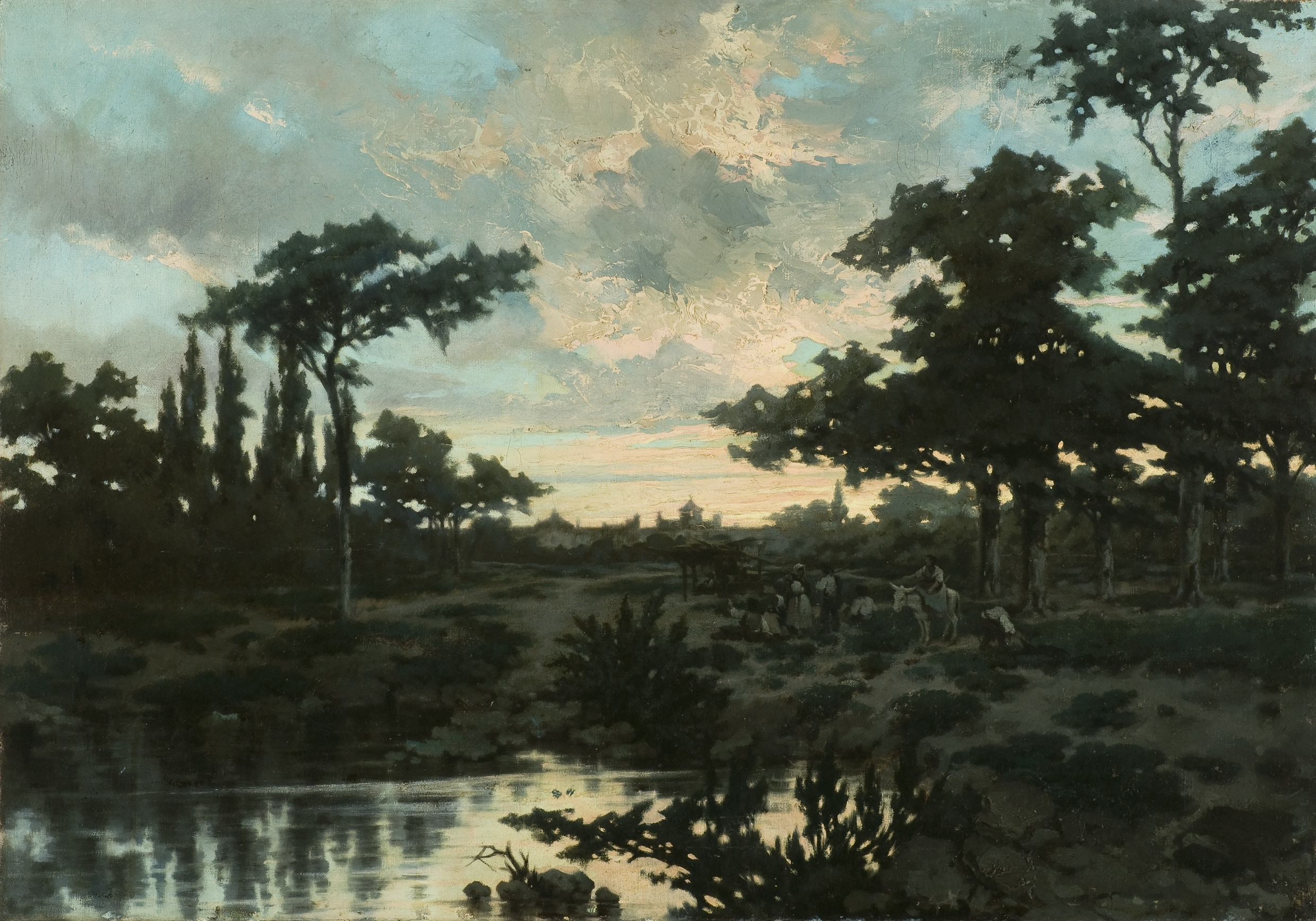
Crepúsculo by Rafael Romero Barros

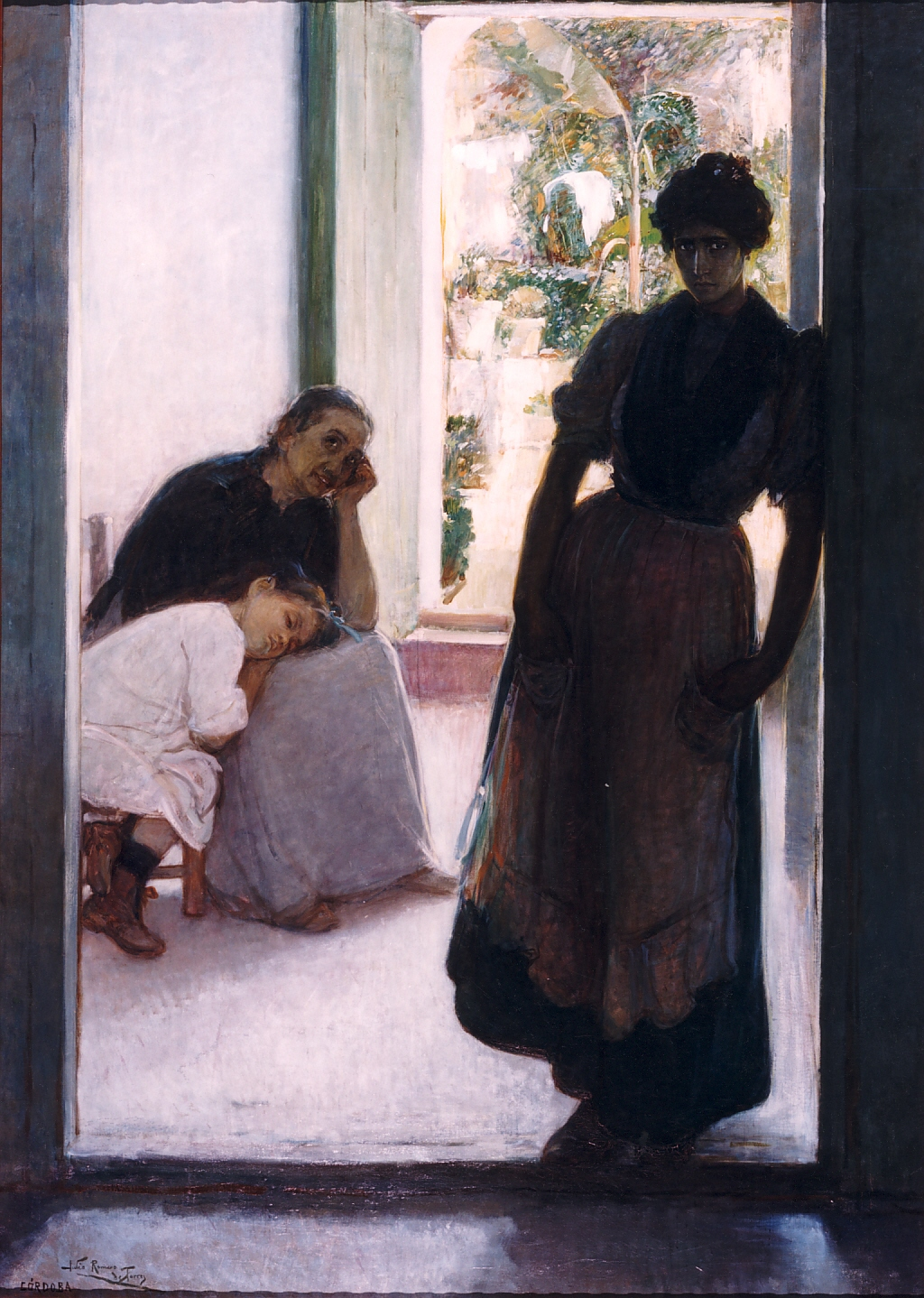
Mal de amores by Julio Romero de Torres

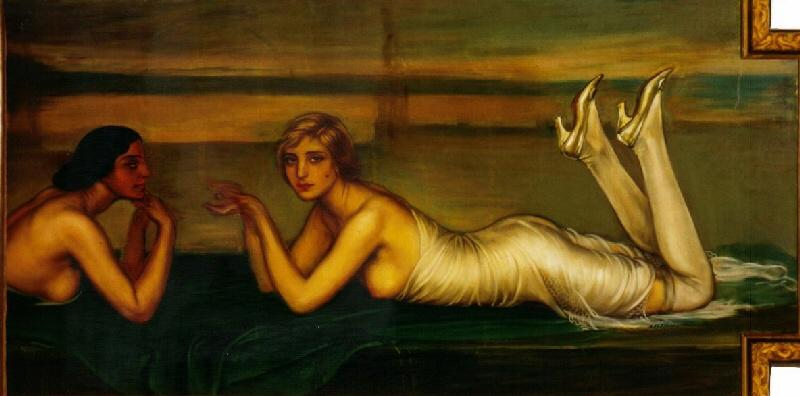
Mujeres sobre mantón by Julio Romero de Torres
