= Rafael Romero de Torres =

Spanish painter (1865–1898)

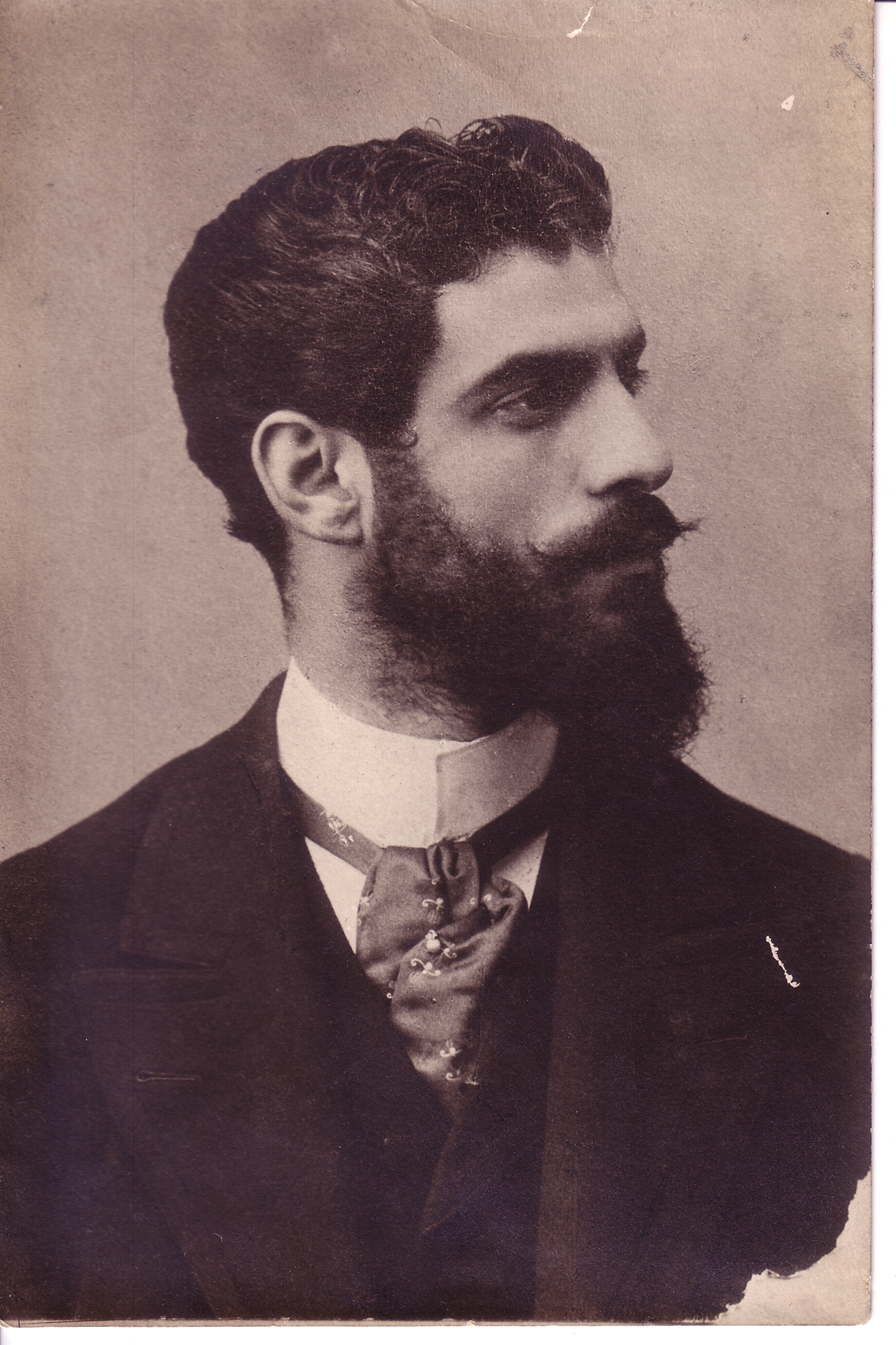
Rafael Romero de Torres (c.1895)

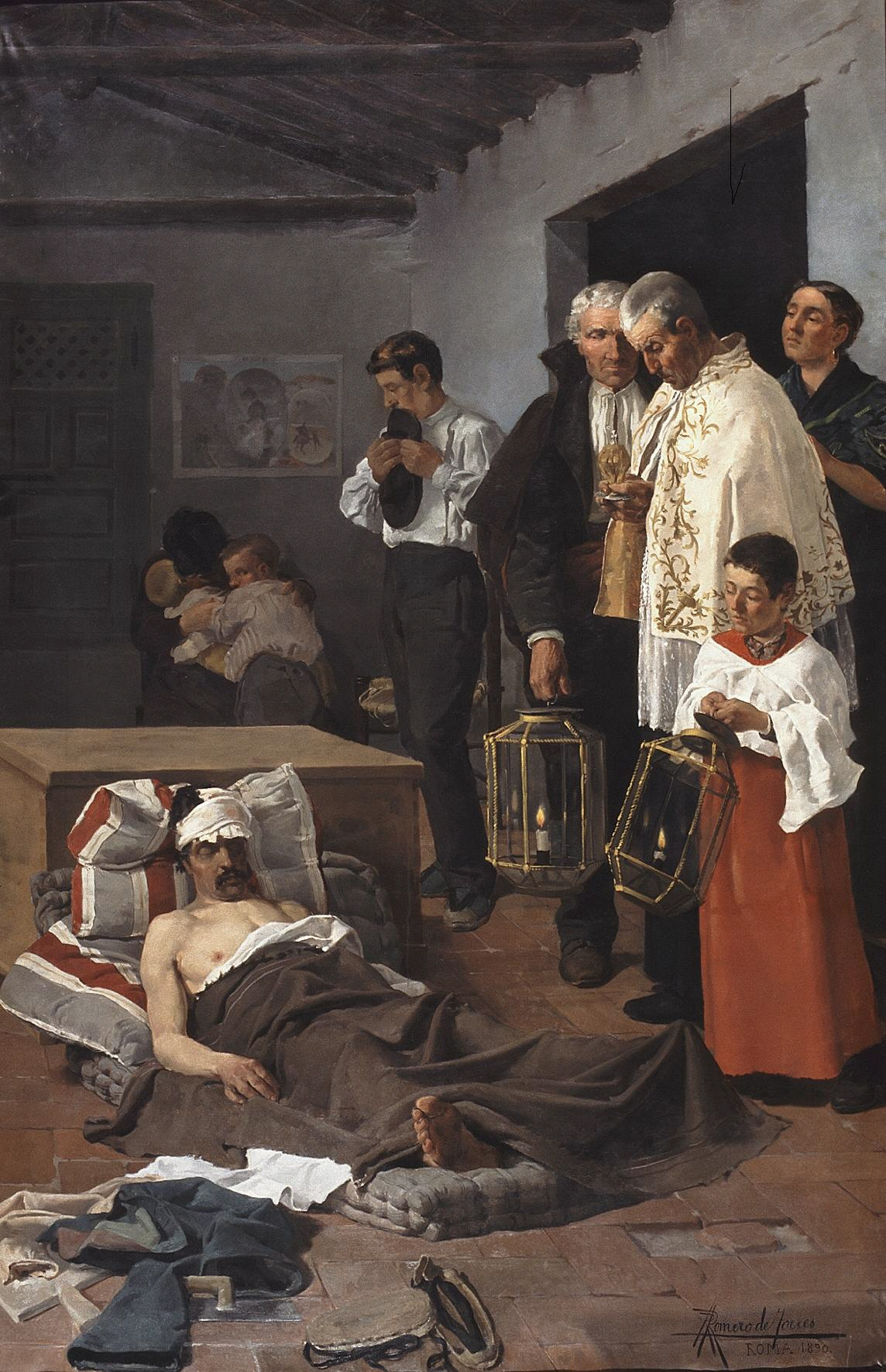
The Injured Stonemason

Rafael Romero de Torres (1865, Córdoba - 29 July 1898, Córdoba) was a Spanish painter, from a family of artists.

== Life and work ==
His father was the painter Rafael Romero Barros. One of eight siblings, Romero was the brother of the painters Julio and Enrique and the archaeologist and curator Ángela Romero de Torres. He showed a talent for art at an early age, so he was enrolled at the Escuela provincial de Bellas Artes.

He was awarded several scholarships, beginning in 1884 with one from the Diputación Provincial de Córdoba, which enabled him to enroll at the Real Academia de Bellas Artes de San Fernando in Madrid. There, he studied sculpture as well as painting. Winning several prizes encouraged him to extend his stay there. In 1885, he was presented with a second scholarship from the Diputación, for his painting Sin trabajo ("Out of Work", or "Unemployed"), which provided him with sufficient funds to spend three years in Rome. There, he befriended other Spanish artists, including the sculptor, Mateo Inurria, and Marceliano Santa María. In 1945, the latter wrote memoirs, recalling the times he spent with Romero and others at the Antico Caffè Greco.

In 1888, he returned to Spain; alternating his residence between Córdoba and Madrid. Much of his work involved socially conscious themes. In 1890, he participated in the National Exhibition of Fine Arts. Quite pleased at having received a second-class medal on his first try, he was disappointed when behind-the-scenes reconsiderations took place. The second-class medal was taken away and awarded to someone else, and he was given a third-class medal instead. According to his friend, Ricardo de Montis: "That injustice produced an indescribable impression on him; it dispelled his illusions, killed his hopes and why not say so? It cost him his life."

After that, he produced only enough to provide himself with basic necessities. For a time he collaborated with Enrique and Julio; providing illustrations for La Gran Vía, a general interest magazine, but it folded in 1895, after only two years. His neglect eventually led to a decline in his health, and he contracted a disease that led to his death.
