= Eduardo Rosales =

Spanish artist (1836–1873)

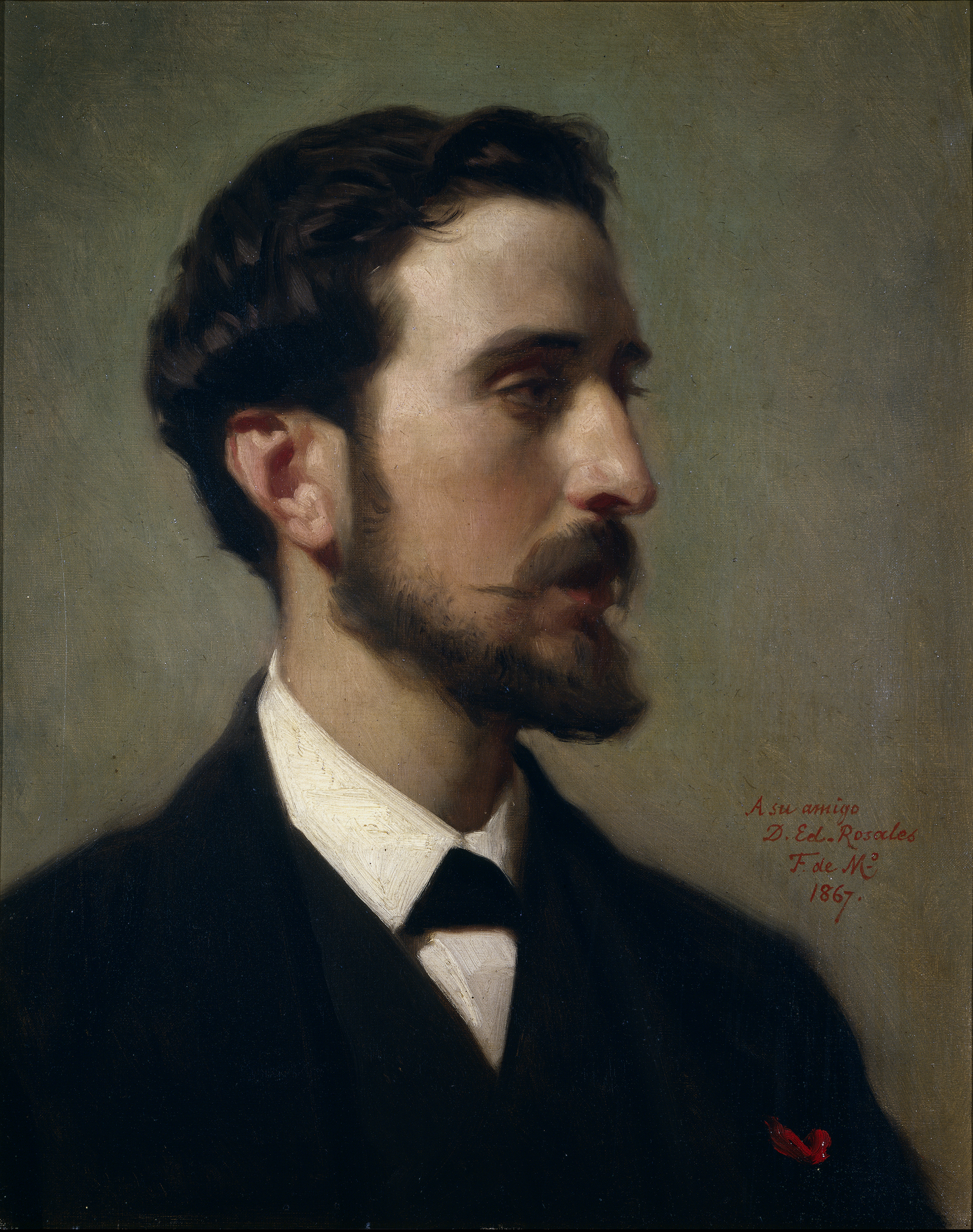
- Eduardo Rosales, portrait by Federico de Madrazo, 1867
- Born: Eduardo Rosales Gallinas; 4 November 1836; Madrid, Spain
- Died: 13 September 1873 (aged 36); Madrid, Spain
- Education: Escolapios Private School, Madrid; Real Academia de Bellas Artes de San Fernando
- Known for: Painter
- Movement: Orientalist; Purismo

Eduardo Rosales Gallinas (4 November 1836 – 13 September 1873) was a Spanish painter. He was an adherent of the Italian-based art movement known as "Purismo" and specialized in historical scenes.

== Biography ==
He was born in Madrid. The second son of a minor official, he began his education in a private school operated by the Escolapios. He was orphaned as a teenager and enrolled in the Real Academia de Bellas Artes de San Fernando, where he studied under Federico de Madrazo in 1851.

Rosales accompanied some friends to Rome in 1857, without a fellowship or other financial support, until he received a special stipend from the government to continue his studies in 1861. He joined a group of Spanish painters who gathered in the Antico Caffè Greco, which included José Casado del Alisal, Dióscoro Puebla and Marià Fortuny. There he began to associate with followers of the Nazarene movement, but soon abandoned his interest in them and produced his first important work "Tobías y el angel".

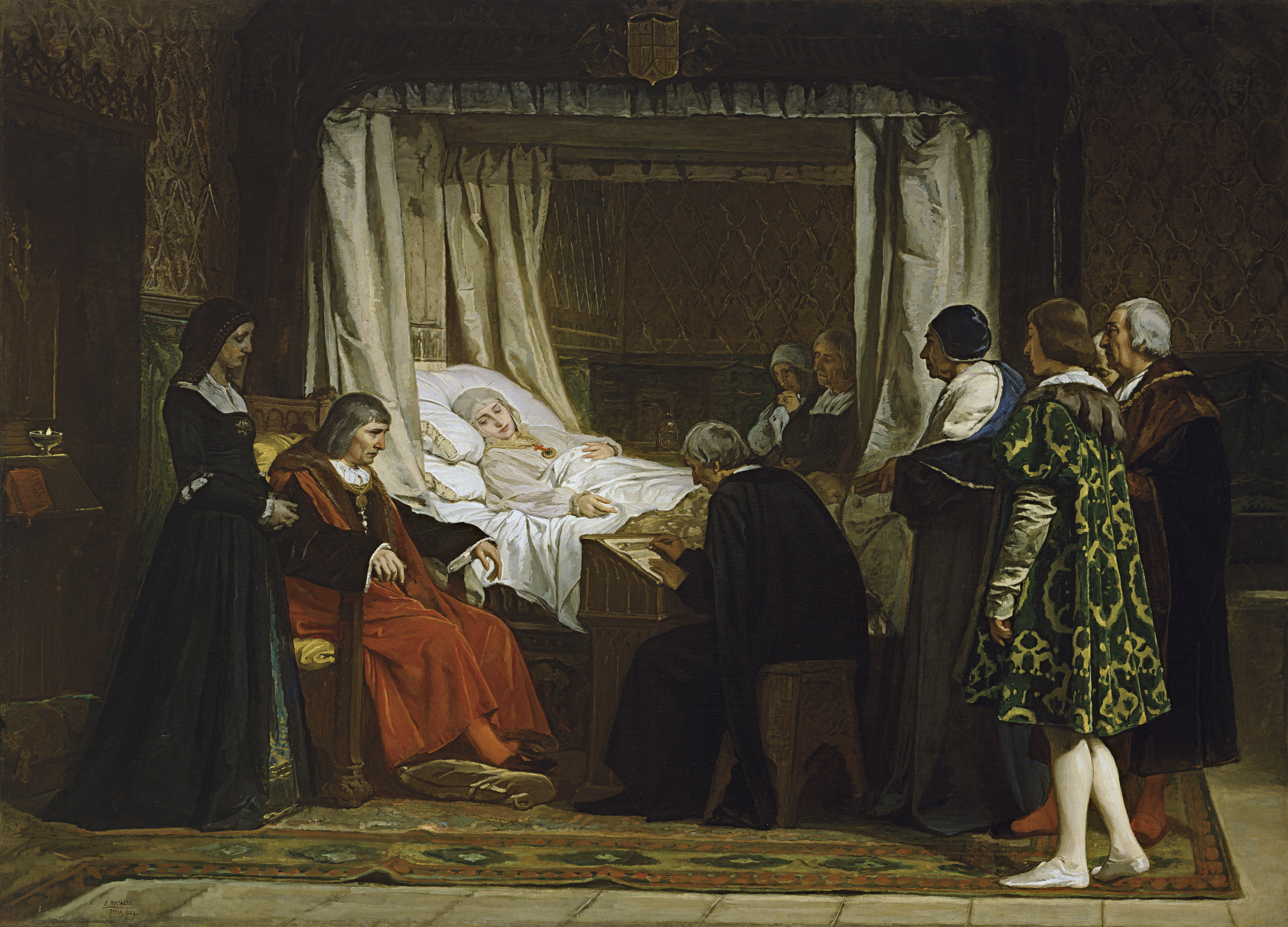
Doña Isabel the Catholic Dictating Her Will (1864)

However, he continued to be interested in developing a more realistic style, which was achieved in his best known work "Doña Isabel la Católica dictando su testamento". He took it to the International Exposition (1867) in Paris and later returned to Rome, where he sent a telegram to his friends Martín Rico and Raimundo de Madrazo telling them that the painting had been an outstanding success, taking the First Gold Medal for work by a foreigner. He was also named a Chevalier in the Legion d'Honneur.

=== Final years ===
He married his cousin Maximina in 1868. They had two children, one of whom, Eloisa, died in infancy and was memorialized in his painting "Primeros pasos" (First Steps). Rosales was in poor health himself, having had tuberculosis for many years, and made frequent visits to Panticosa in the Pyrenees, where the water was famous for its curative properties. In 1869, he left Rome for good and opened a studio in Madrid. The harsh criticism he received for his work "La Muerte de Lucrecia" (1871) left him discouraged and he never painted another large-scale canvas.

The following year, hoping to find a climate that would more amenable to his health, he moved to Murcia. Upon the declaration of the First Spanish Republic, he was offered positions at the Museo del Prado, which he rejected, and at the new Spanish Academy in Rome, which he accepted but never filled, due to his worsening condition. He died shortly thereafter, in Madrid.

In 1922, Madrid honored him with a memorial statue, sculpted by Mateo Inurria and placed on a street named after him, the Paseo del Pintor Rosales.

== Other selected paintings ==
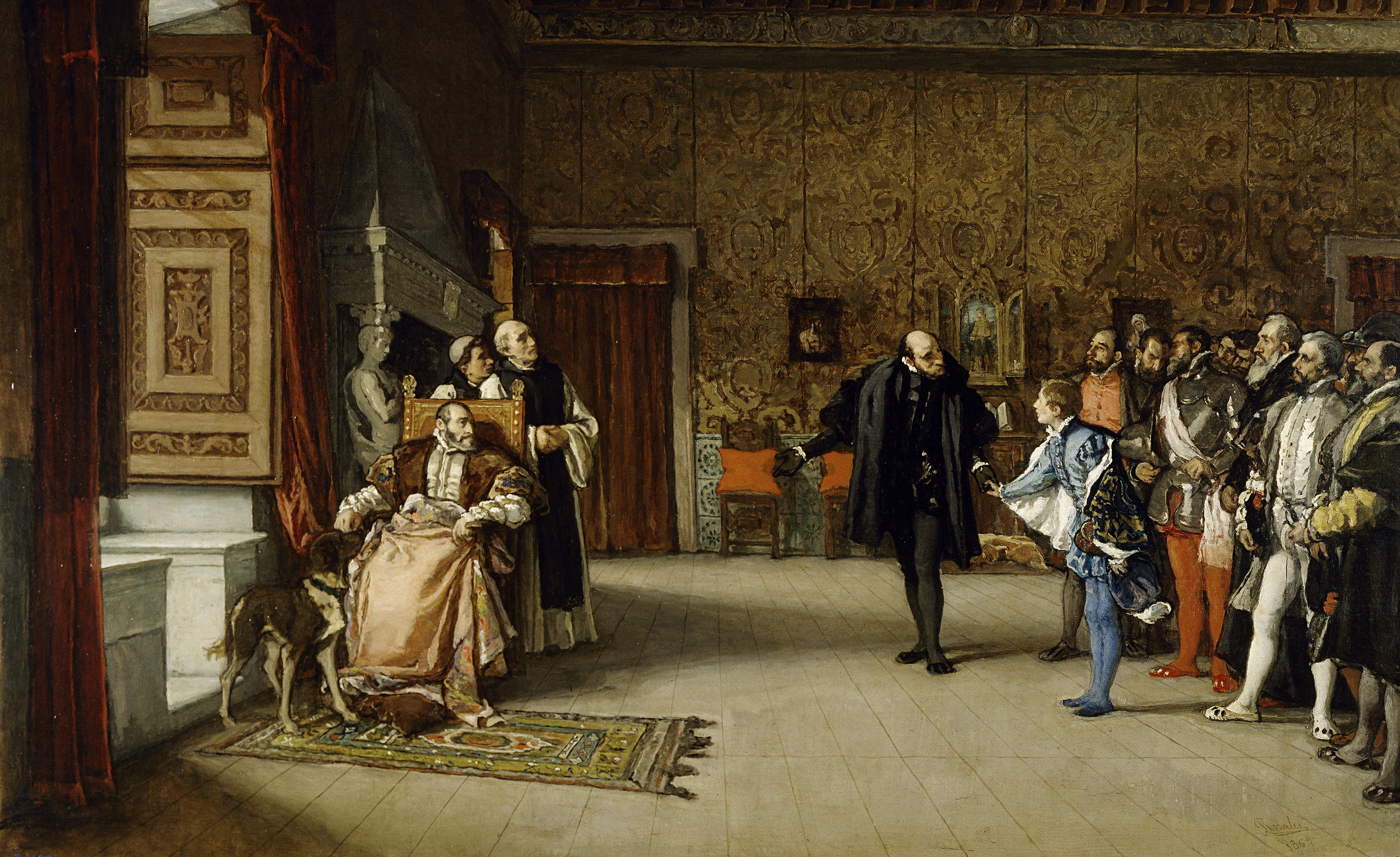
John of Austria being presented to Emperor
Charles V in Yuste (1868/1869)

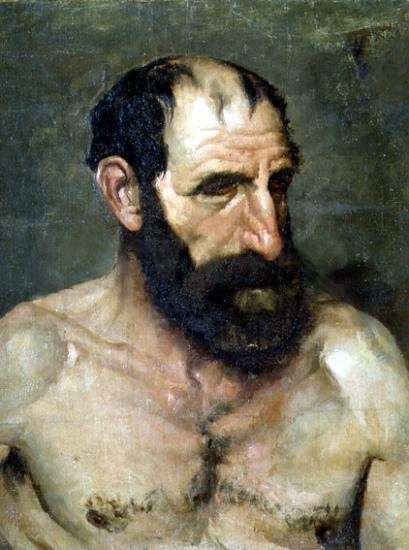
Sketch of Diogenes
(date unknown)

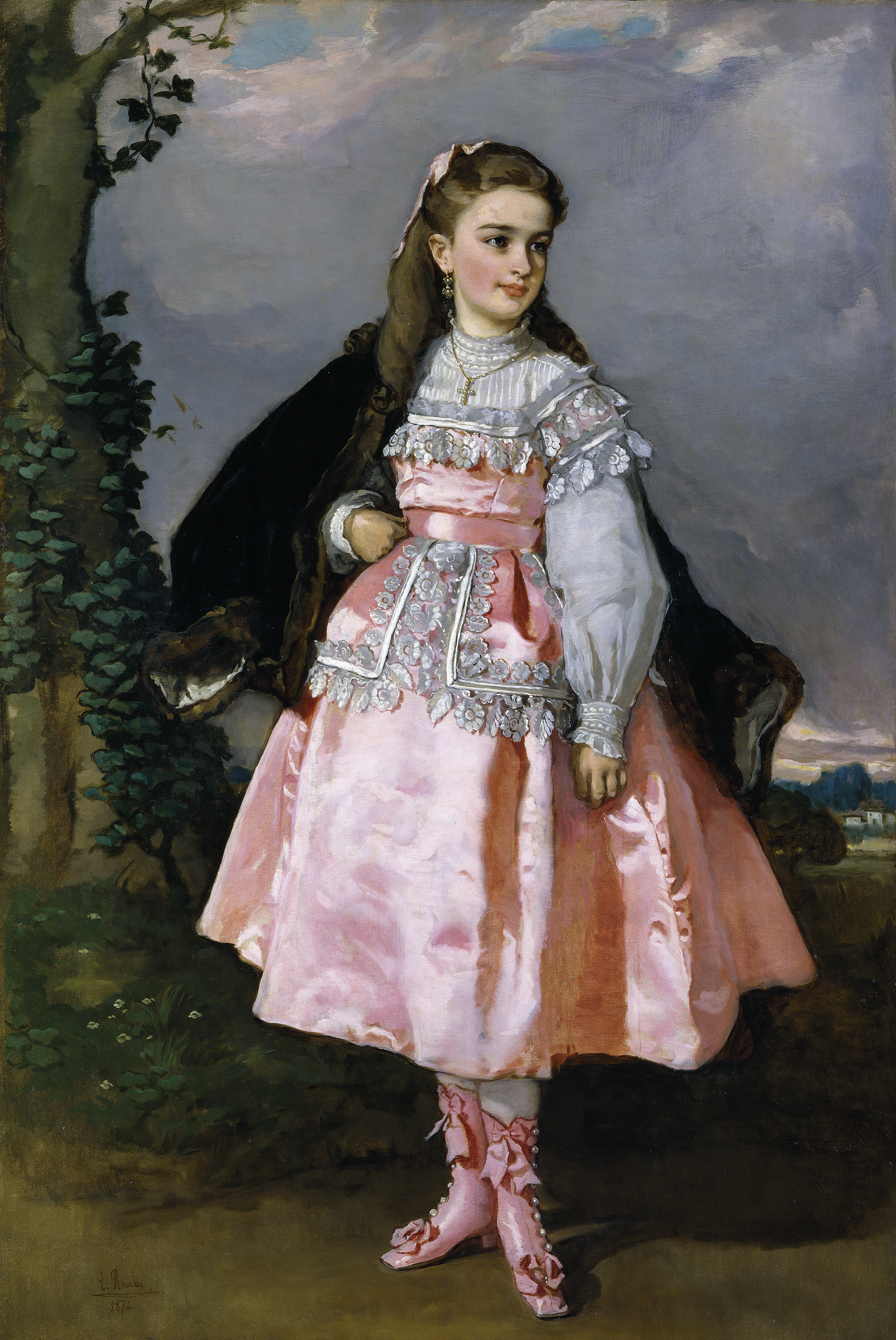
The Countess of Santovenia ("The Pink Girl", 1871)

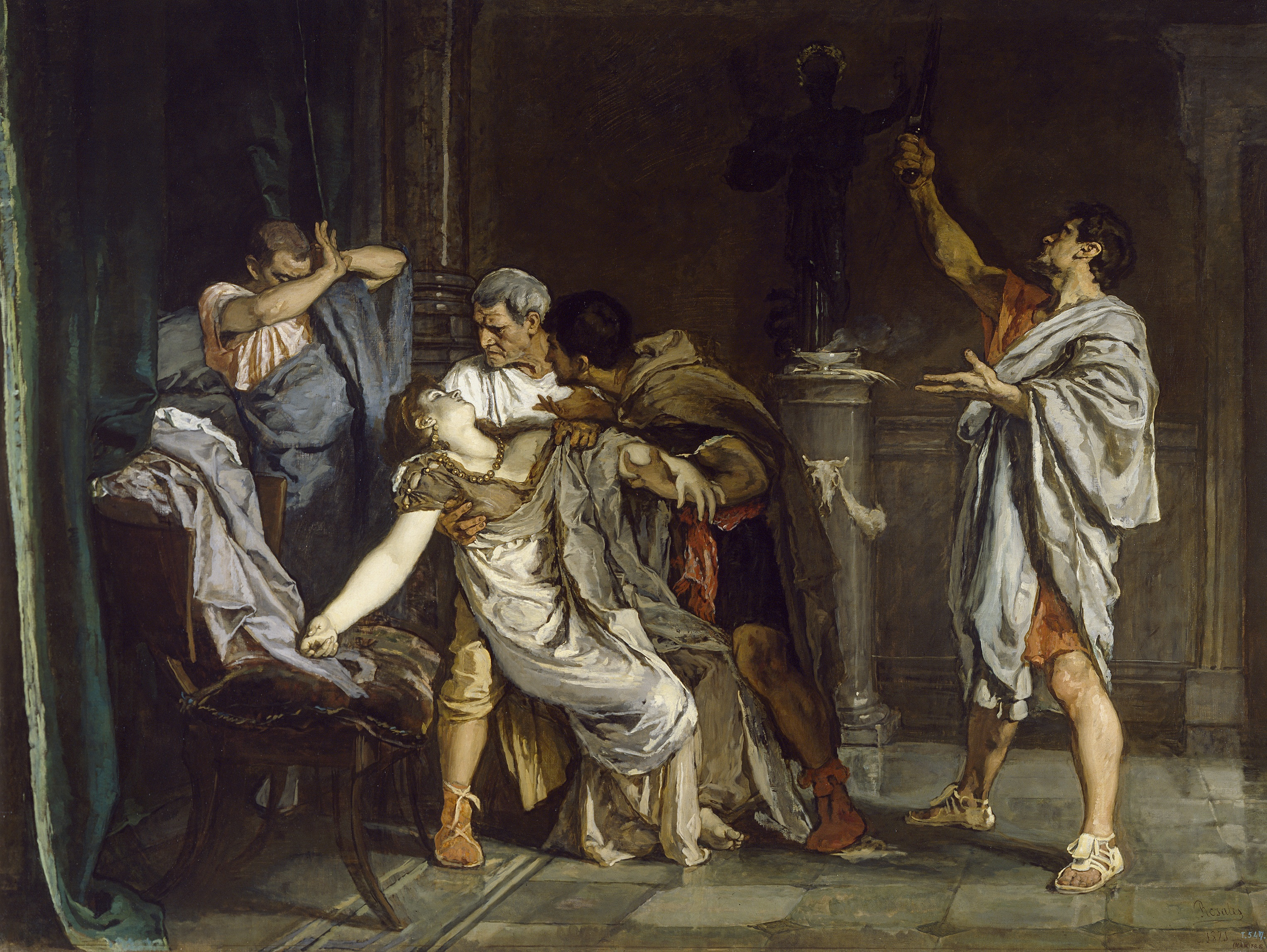
The Death of Lucretia (1871)
