= Antonio García Reinoso =

Spanish painter

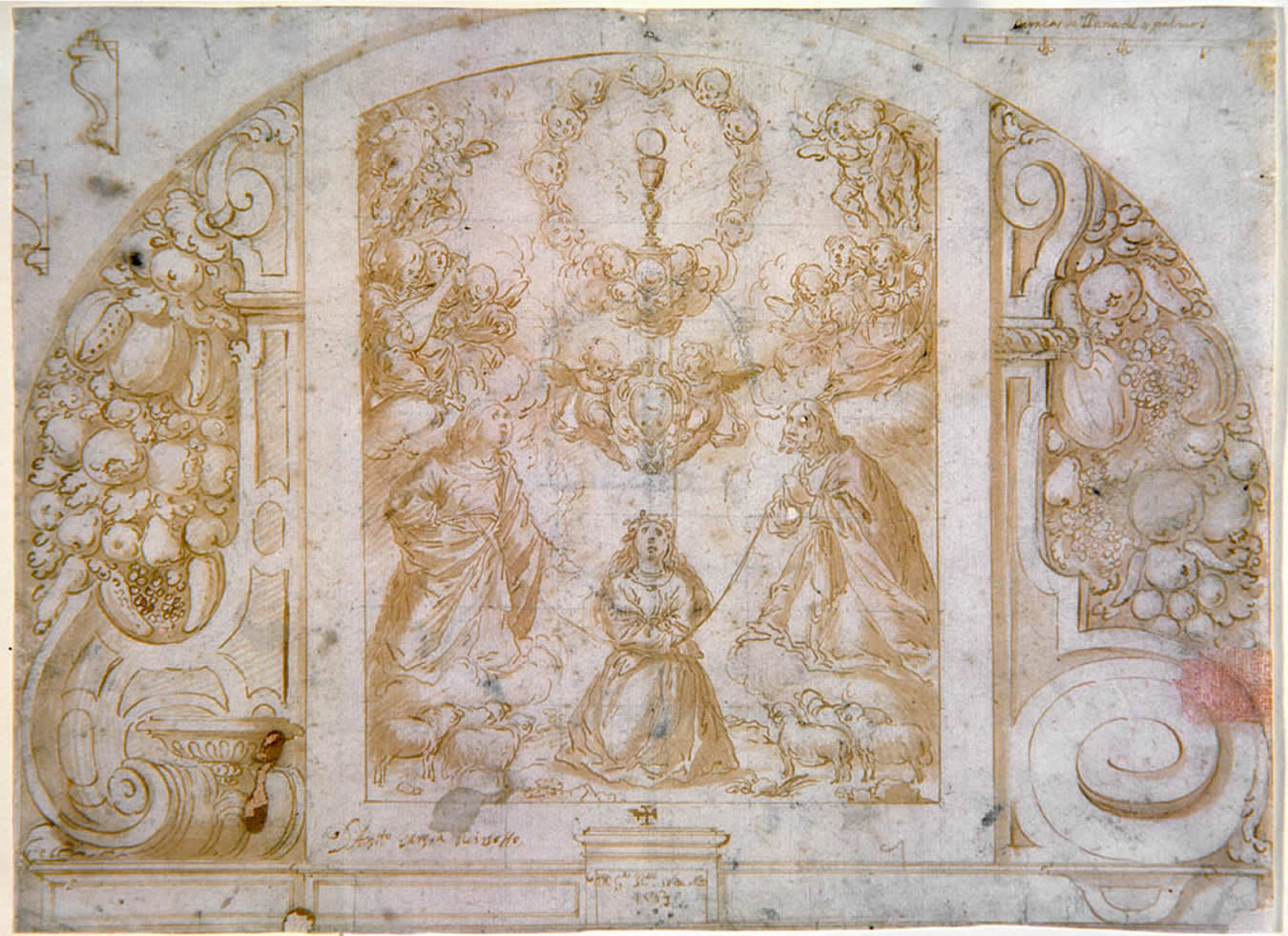
Project for a retable with an allegory of the venarable third order, drawing from 1663, now in the Museum of Fine Arts of Córdoba

Antonio García Reinoso (1623–1677), a Spanish painter, was born at Granada, and studied under Sebastián Martínez Domedel, an artist of some eminence, at Jaen. He painted landscapes and historical subjects; and there are several of his works noticed by Palomino, particularly an altarpiece in the church of the Capuchins at Andújar, representing the Trinity, with several Saints. There are also some of his pictures in the churches and private collections at Cordova, in which city he died.

At the Teatro el jardinito de Cabra, the hall of expositions is named after him.

== Works ==
- Immaculate Conception (oil on panel, 173 x 115 cm), Museo de Bellas Artes, Córdoba.
- Project for a retable with an allegory of the venerable third order, drawing from 1663, now in the Museum of Fine Arts of Córdoba
- Series of four panels of Ferdinand III the Holy (made around 1675–76) at the Córdoba Cathedral:
  - Saint Ferdinand in the conquest of Baeza
  - Saint Ferdinand in the conquest of Córdoba
  - Saint Ferdinand in the conquest of Seville
  - Saint Ferdinand with the universal monarch.
- Frescoes at the Real Iglesia de Santa Marta (Royal Church) in Martos
