= Juan de Peñalosa =

Spanish painter (1579–1633)

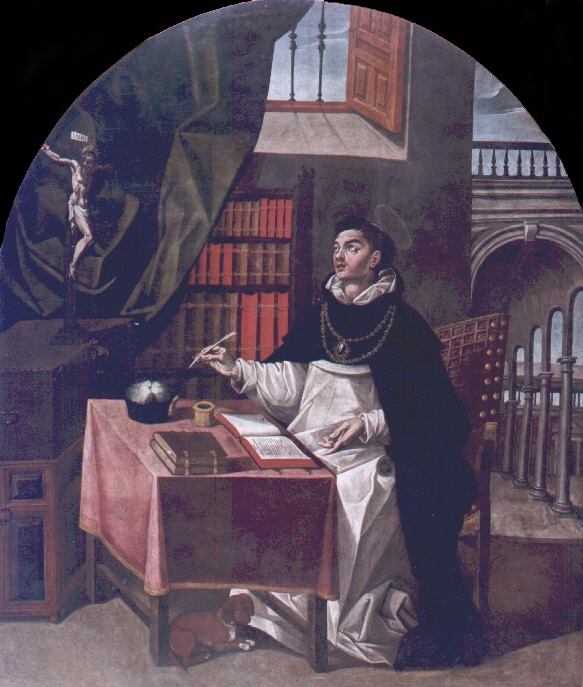
St. Thomas Aquinas by Juan de Peñalosa, Museum of Fine Arts in Córdoba, Andalusia, 1610

Juan de Peñalosa y Sandoval (7 November 1579 – 1633) was a Spanish painter of altarpieces, a priest and poet.

Juan de Peñalosa was born in the parish of San Bartolome de Baena as the legitimate son of Francisco Peñalosa and Ana Fernandez, last name Sandoval. He sometimes used his full name, possibly for prestige reasons, as his grandfather was Francisco Bravo de la Rosa y Sandoval, who was a minor official at the time. He trained as a painter in Córdoba, Andalusia with Pablo de Céspedes, and also studied and worked with the scholar and painter Francisco Pacheco.

Only after the death of Céspedes are there works that are signed and dated by Peñalosa. The first, in 1609, one San Francisco Cordoba penitent painted and sent to the Franciscan nuns in Salamanca. From 1610 is the Assumption of the Virgin, canvas preserved in the Museum of Fine Arts in Córdoba, and from the Convent of the Holy Martyrs is the Last Supper dated 1613, also a copy of a previous Céspedes work. The paintings of the St. Thomas Aquinas and Saint Peter Martyr, and a Lady of the Rosary with San Acisclus and Santa Victoria, the patron saints of Córdoba, in which there is an evolved color treatment, are found at the Santa Barbara Cordoba cathedral.
