= Ángela Romero de Torres =

Spanish archaeologist and curator (1880–1975)

- Born: María de los Ángeles Romero de Torres; 8 December 1880; Córdoba, Spain
- Died: 6 August 1975 (aged 94); Córdoba, Spain
- Other name: Angelita Romero de Torre
- Occupations: Archaeologist; curator
- Father: Rafael Romero Barros
- Relatives: Rafael Romero de Torres; Enrique Romero de Torres; Julio Romero de Torres

María de los Ángeles "Ángela" or "Angelita" Romero de Torres (8 December 1880 – 6 August 1975) was a Spanish archaeologist and curator, who served as the director of the Romero de Torres archeological collection (Spanish: La colección arqueológica Romero de Torres).

== Biography ==
Romero was born María de los Ángela Romero de Torres on 8 December 1880 in Córdoba to Rafael Romero Barros, a painter, and Rosario de Torres Delgado. (Note: Also cited as Ángeles.) The youngest of eight siblings, Romero was the sister of the painters Rafael, Enrique and Julio Romero de Torres.

Romero was appointed the director of the Romero de Torres archeological collection (Spanish: La colección arqueológica Romero de Torres). Originally founded by her father, the collection was housed at the families' residence. Between 1943 and 1950, Romero published a series of articles which detailed the collection. In 1945, Romero became a correspondent of the Royal Academy of Sciences, Fine Arts and Letters of Cordoba iun recognition of her archaeological and artist work.

On 6 August 1975, Romero died in Córdoba aged 94.

== Publications ==
- Romero de Torres, Á (1943). "La Colección Arqueológica Romero de Torres". Memorias de los Museos Arqueológicos Provinciales. IV: 205–208.
- Romero de Torres, Á (1945). "Expresión de gratitud" (PDF). Boletín de la Real Academia de Córdoba. 53. Córdoba: 117–122.
- Romero de Torres, Á (1950). "La Colección Arqueológica Romero de Torres". Boletín de la Real Academia de Córdoba. 64. Córdoba: 101–109.
