= Pedro Romana =

Spanish Renaissance painter (c.1460–1536)

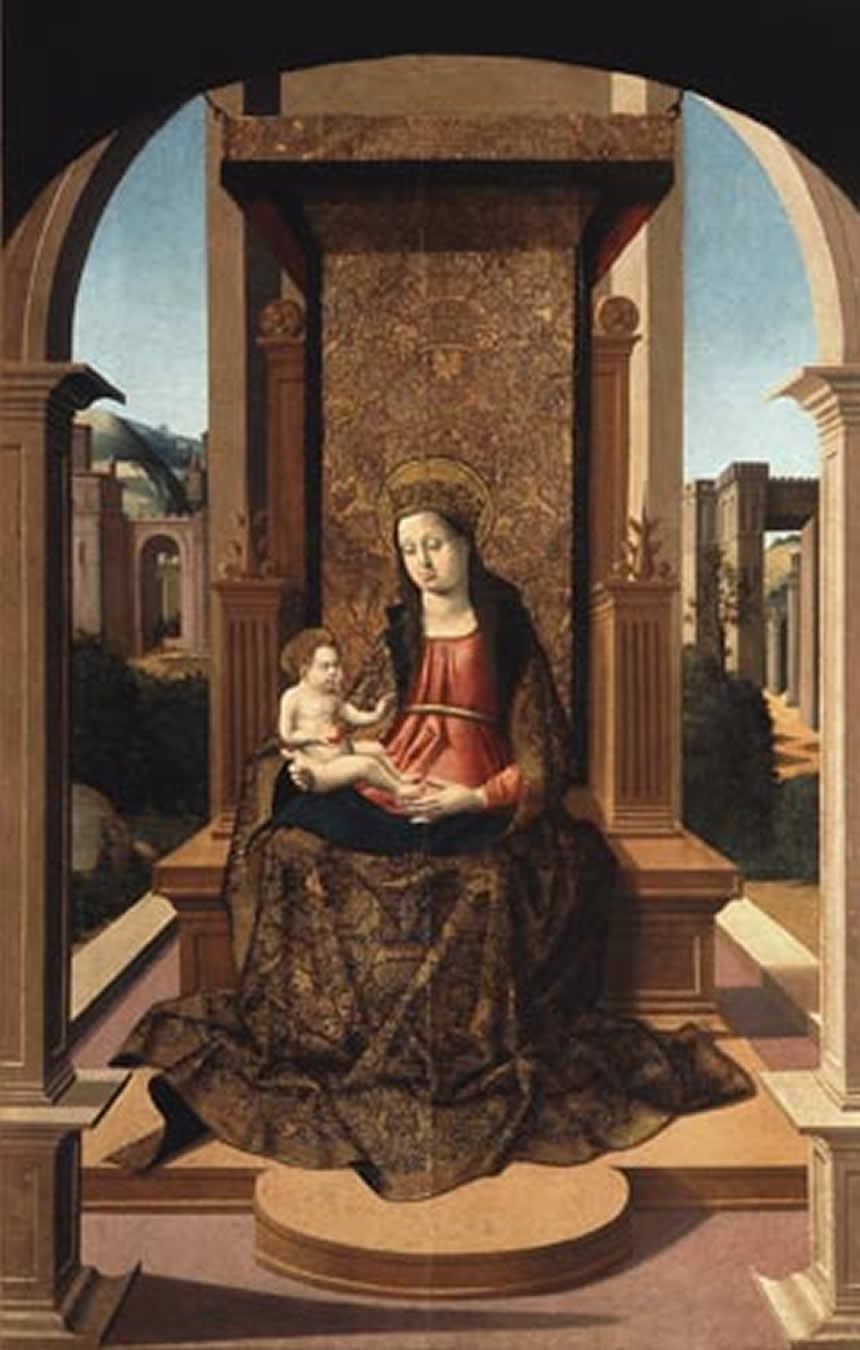
Virgin and Child by Pedro Romana, Museo de Bellas Artes (Córdoba)

Pedro Romana (c.1460–1536) was a Spanish Renaissance painter.

Romana was probably born around Córdoba, Andalusia where he was active from 1488 to 1536. He specialized in religious-themed works for church commissions, especially altarpieces for local churches. His style puts him in the Córdoba School, although he also shows influence of both Flemish and Italian art. He was elected president of the Guild of Saint Luke in 1515. Documents show that he got into financial difficulties, because in 1528 he was arrested for debt. He is known to have painted the Adoration of the Magi for the altarpiece in the church of Espejo in Córdoba, and Virgin and Child in the Museo de Bellas Artes (Córdoba), dated 1488.
