= Pablo de Céspedes =

Spanish painter

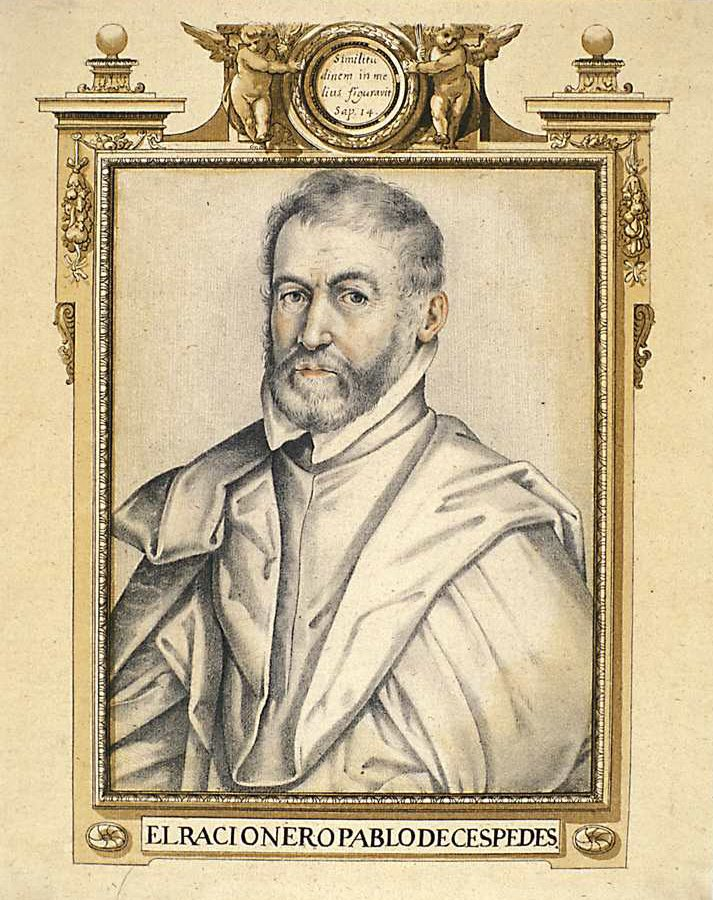
- Born: 1538
- Died: July 26, 1608 (aged 69–70)
- Burial place: Córdoba, Spain
- Citizenship: Spain
- Education: Universidad Complutense
- Parents: Alonso Céspedes (father); Olaya de Arroya (mother)

Pablo de Céspedes (1538 – July 26, 1608) was a Spanish painter, poet, and architect.

== Biography ==
His father, Alonso Céspedes, was descended of a noble Castilian family, once settled at Ocaña, and the name of his mother, who was a native of Alcolea de Torote, was Olaya de Arroya. Pablo was born and brought up in the house of his father's maternal uncle, Francisco Lopez de Aponte, Canon of Cordoba, where he received a learned education. At the age of eighteen, in 1556, he was sent to the Universidad Complutense in Alcalá de Henares, and there, devoted himself to the acquirement of Oriental languages and theology. He later moved to Rome where he studied painting under Federico Zuccari.

He was in Rome in February 1559, engaged in conducting certain negotiations for the Archbishop Carranza de Miranda, of Toledo, who then stood charged with heresy before the Inquisition of Valladolid. On the 17th of that month he addressed a letter to the prelate, informing him how his business stood at the Vatican, in which he incautiously reflected on the conduct of the Inquisitor-General Valdez, and the Holy Office—an offence which no Inquisitor-General would forgive.

This document and others were seized with the primate's papers; he was therefore denounced by the tribunal, and but for his fortunate absence, would have been imprisoned. It is probable that he did not venture back into Spain for many years, until he had covered his sins with the protecting robes of the Church.

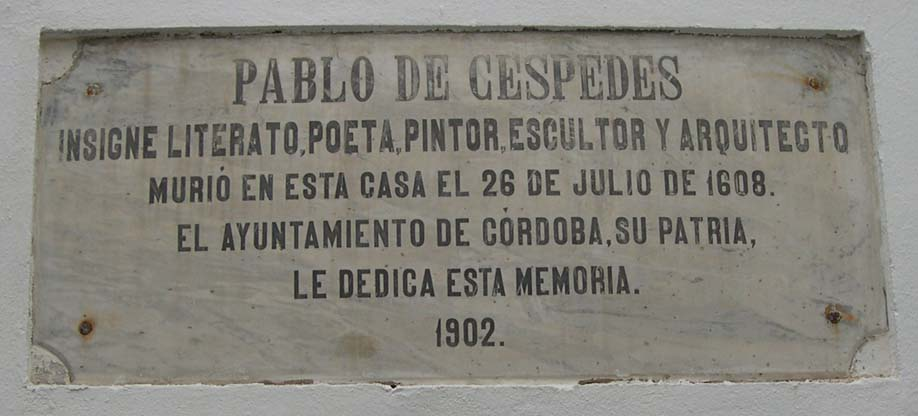
Commemorative plaque of Pablo de Céspedes, final resting place, Córdoba, Spain

He remained in Italy for over 20 years and built a reputation as an artist. His only surviving works from that period are the frescoes he painted in the Bonfili chapel at the Santa Trinità dei Monti church in Rome.

He returned to Spain in 1577, and was appointed as the canon of the Córdoba cathedral. He continued to write books on antiquarian topics such as the architecture of the temple of Solomon. He befriended Arias Montano. In 1604 he composed his Discourse of Ancient and Modern Painting and Sculpture in which he recounts anecdotes of Renaissance masters of Italy. Among his students was Juan Alfonso Abril.

== Gallery ==
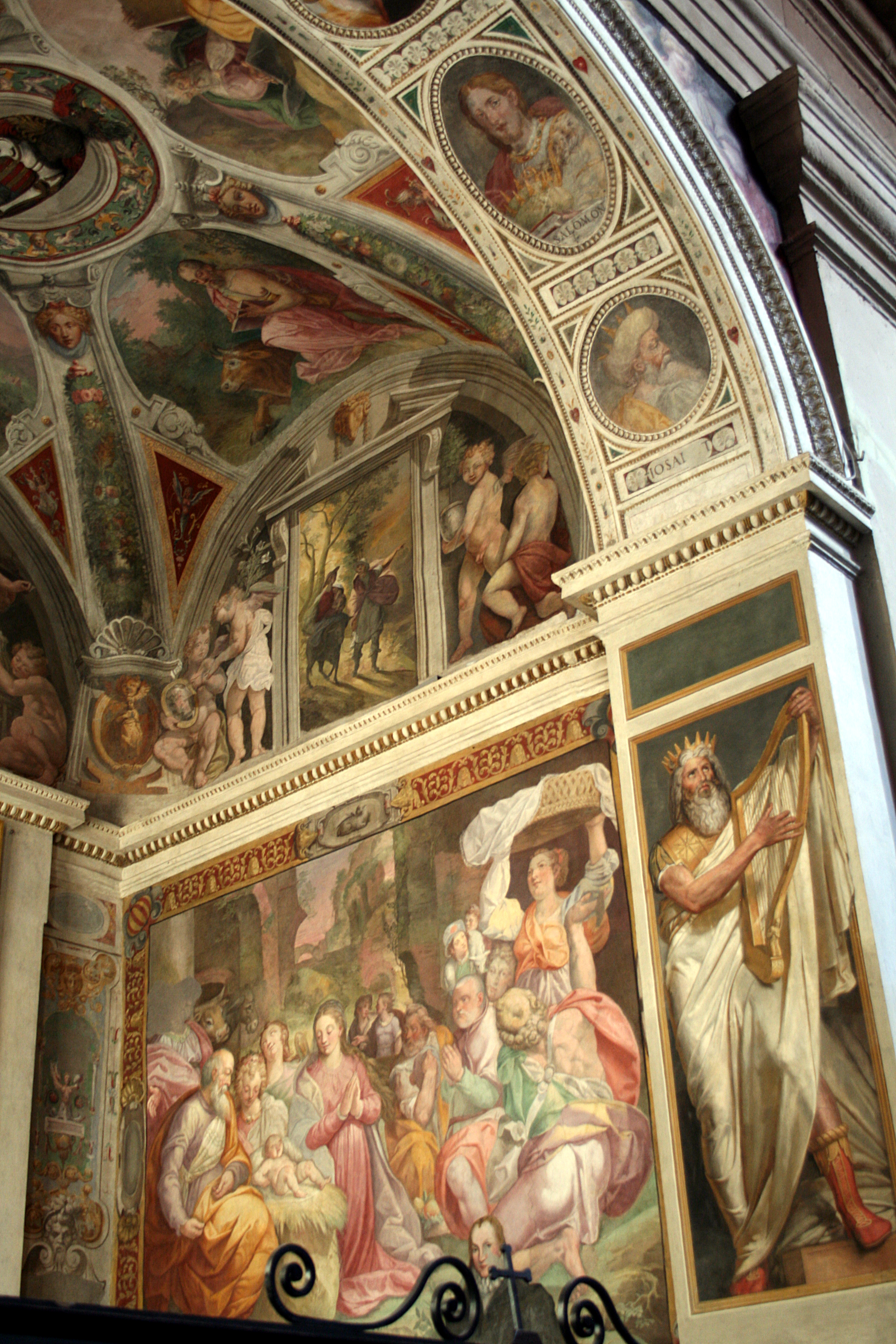
Nativity in Trinità dei Monti

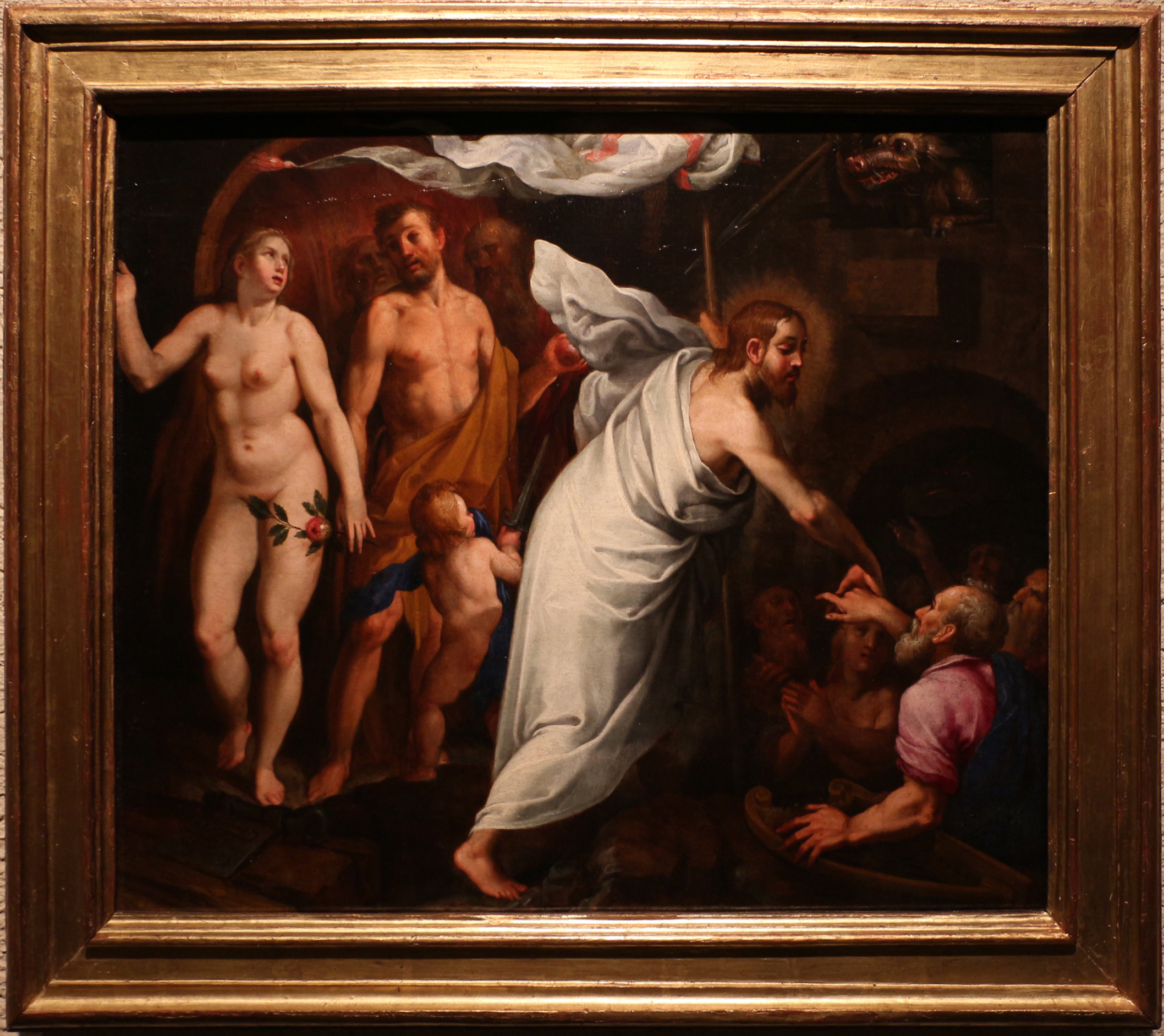
Descent of Christ into Limbo (Indianapolis Museum of Art)

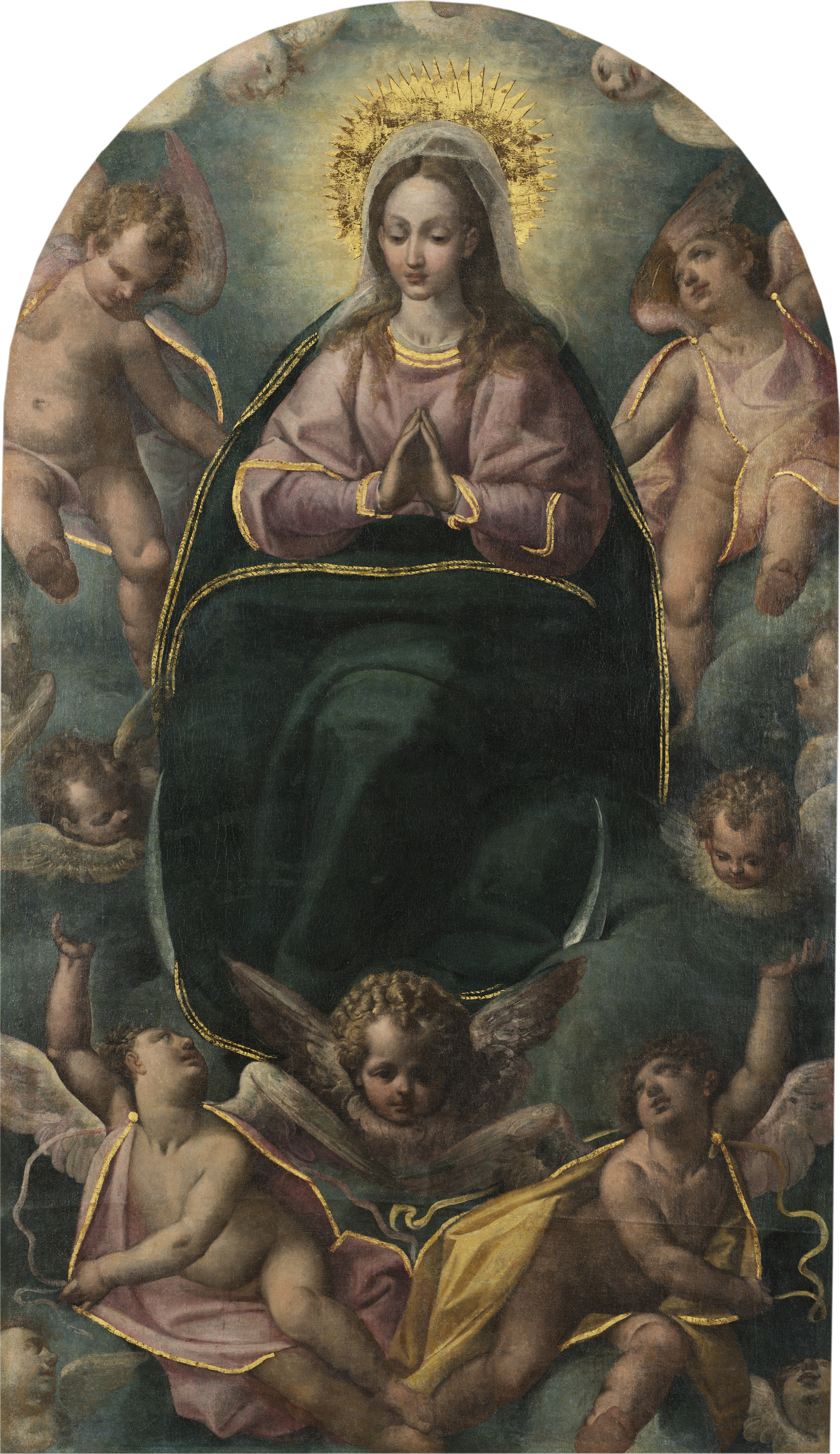
Virgin with Angels (Fine Arts Museum of Córdoba)
