= Marceliano Santa María Sedano =

Spanish painter (1866–1952)

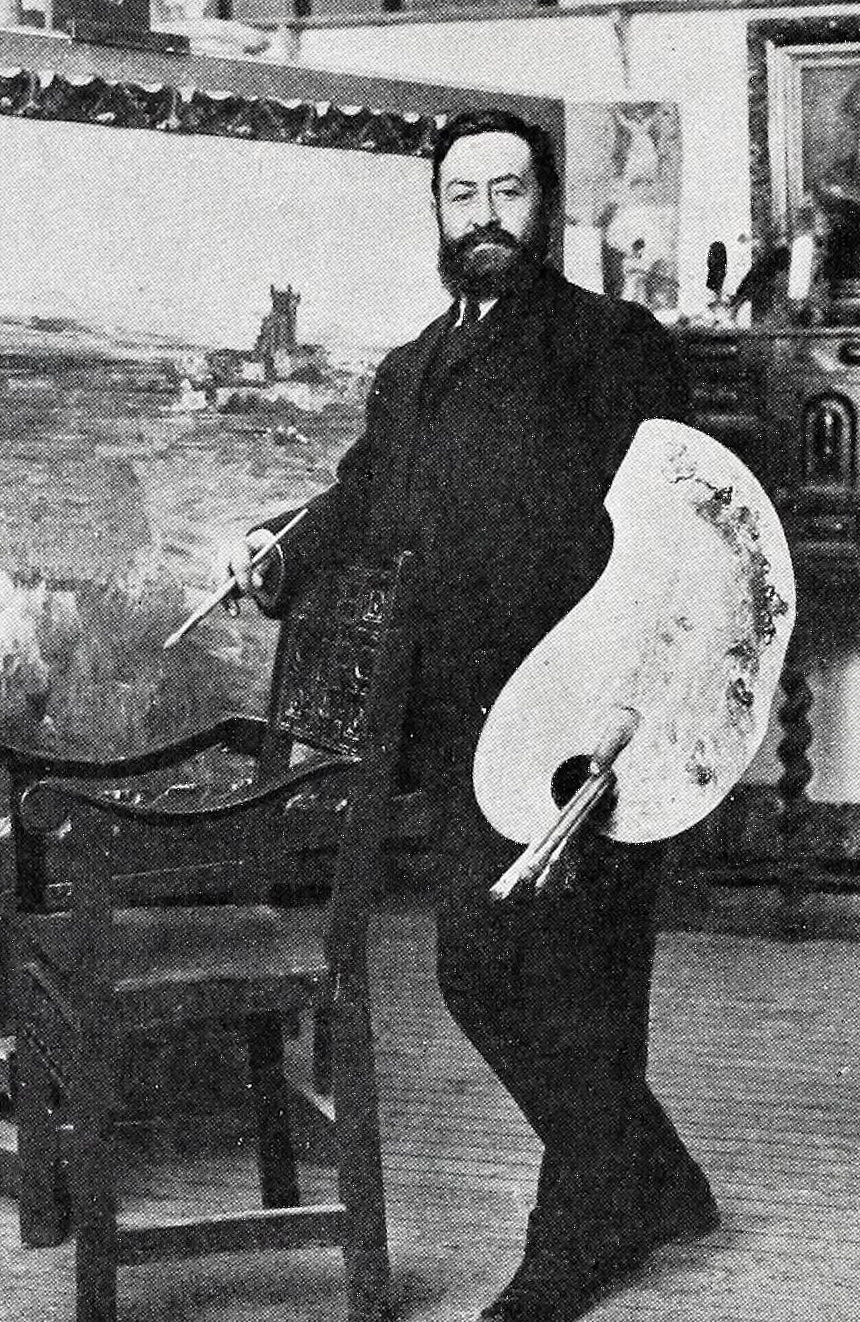
- Circa 5 May 1906
- Born: June 18, 1866; Burgos
- Died: October 12, 1952 (aged 86); Madrid
- Known for: Real Academia de Bellas Artes de San Fernando, Castilian landscapes and portrait artist
- Notable work: El triunfo de la Santa Cruz en la batalla de las Navas de Tolosa; La misa de pontifical; Páramo; Las hijas del Cid; Angélica y Medoro,

Marceliano Santa María (18 June 1866 Burgos - 12 October 1952 in Madrid) was a Spanish painter, noted for his Castilian landscapes, historical art, and portraits.

== Life ==
Santa María was born into a religious family with strong religious views. His full name was Marceliano Santa María Sedano, although he always signed as Marceliano Santa María. His uncle, Ángel Sedano, canon from Burgos Cathedral, was the founder of the Círculo Católico de Obreros of Burgos, an institution where his father, a professional silversmith, also belonged. From an early age he began to show talent with painting; people were amazed with his speed drawing portraits. Santa María studied high school in his hometown (although he finished them in Palencia) and attended the Provincial Academy of Drawing of Burgos located in the Paseo del Espolón, where he received the classes of Isidro Gil and Evaristo Barrio

His parents were opposed to his artistic vocation, however he always had the support of his uncle, who encouraged him to paint religious matters. Together with his uncle, he moved to Madrid, in 1885, with the intention of attending the classes of the Circle of Fine Arts and San Fernando Academy of Fine Arts. Similarly, he frequently visited the studio of the painter Manuel Domínguez Sánchez, where he concurred with other young painters such as Fernando Álvarez de Sotomayor and Eduardo Chicharro Agüera. Also in 1885, thanks to a landscape canvas, he won the Second Prize at the Exhibition of Fine Arts in Burgos.

He studied in Rome between 1891 and 1895 to perfect his technical knowledge, although he visited Spain frequently. He was sponsored by the Diputación de Burgos and during his stay in Italy he painted one of his most famous works: El Triunfo de la Santa Cruz, which was exhibited at the International Exhibition of Madrid and at the Universal Exhibition of Chicago (1893), where he won the unique award medal This canvas represents the famous battle of Las Navas de Tolosa and is currently displayed in the Marceliano Santa María Museum in Burgos. After this success he continued exhibiting his works in the main cities of Spain.

=== Career ===
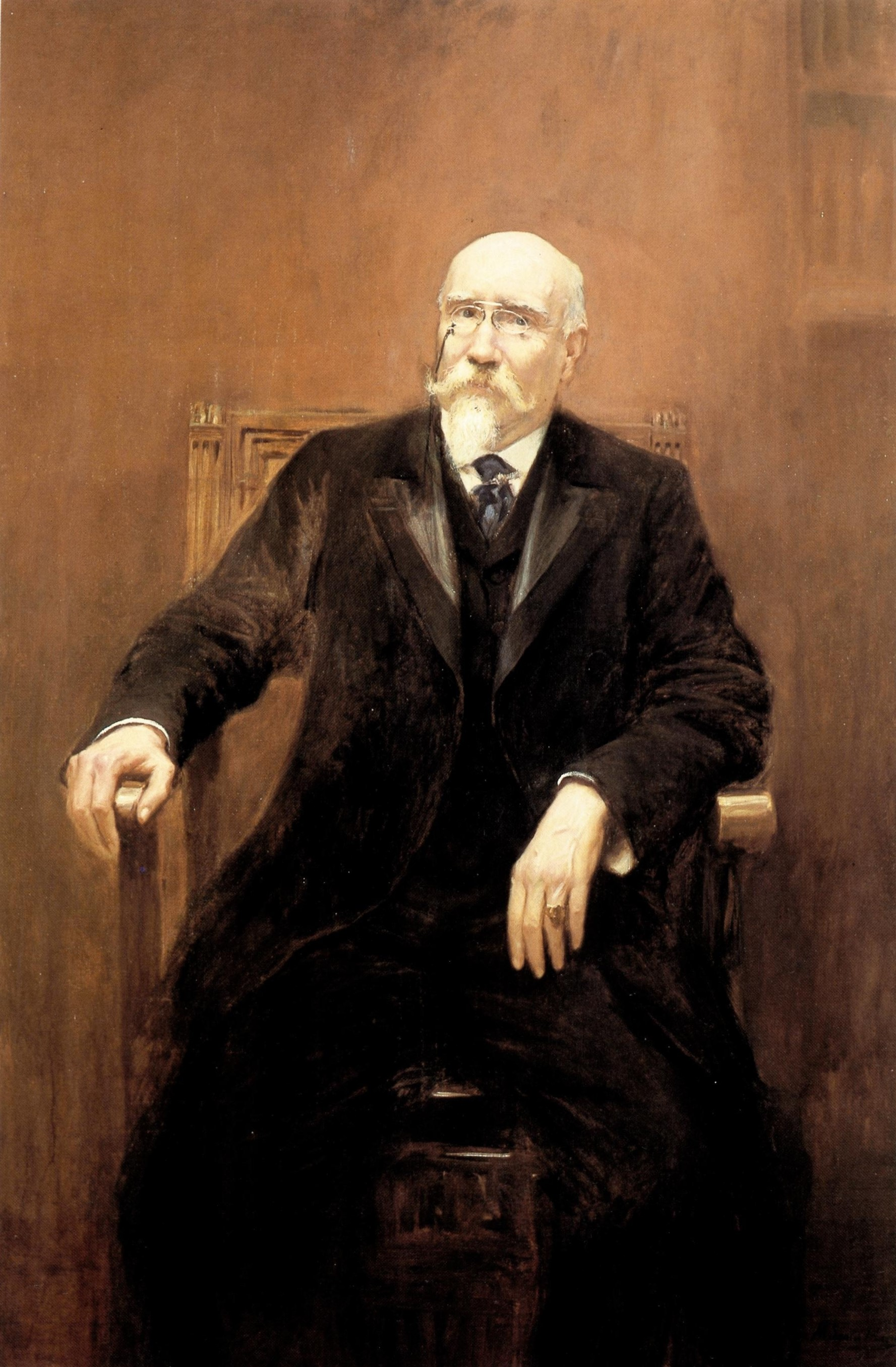
Painting of José Echegaray of Marceliano Santa María

In 1895 Sedano returned to Spain to settle in Burgos, where the Ayuntamiento de Burgos (City Council) required him to paint pictures, murals and ceilings. From this period we can admire the painting El Esquileo (preserved in the Salón de Estrados of the Diputación Provincial de Burgos). From 1900 he dedicated himself to teaching in Burgos, creating a famous school of painters who continued with his style. During this period, the artist made numerous portraits of Alfonso XIII, king of Spain as well as portraits of aristocrats and local bourgeois. However, the nickname of "Painter of Castile" comes from his innumerable landscapes, which convey sensitivity comparable with that shown in literature by the Generation of 98, which considered Castile and its landscapes as the core of Spain. At this time, his most famous painting is Se va ensanchando Castilla (Widening Castilla), which represents the exiled El Cid and presides over the main staircase of Burgos City Hall Building. Later, in 1920 he painted the fresco La Ley triunfando sobre el mal, also known as El vencimiento de los delitos y los vicios ante la aparición de la Justicia, on the ceiling of the Plenary Hall of Spain's Supreme Court Building. This piece shows a goddess, who holds two white horses, how the correct execution of the laws can overcome evil, which would include rape, homicide, and theft, among others. It symbolizes hope and the prevalence of good over evil thanks to the future application of laws.

=== Last years ===
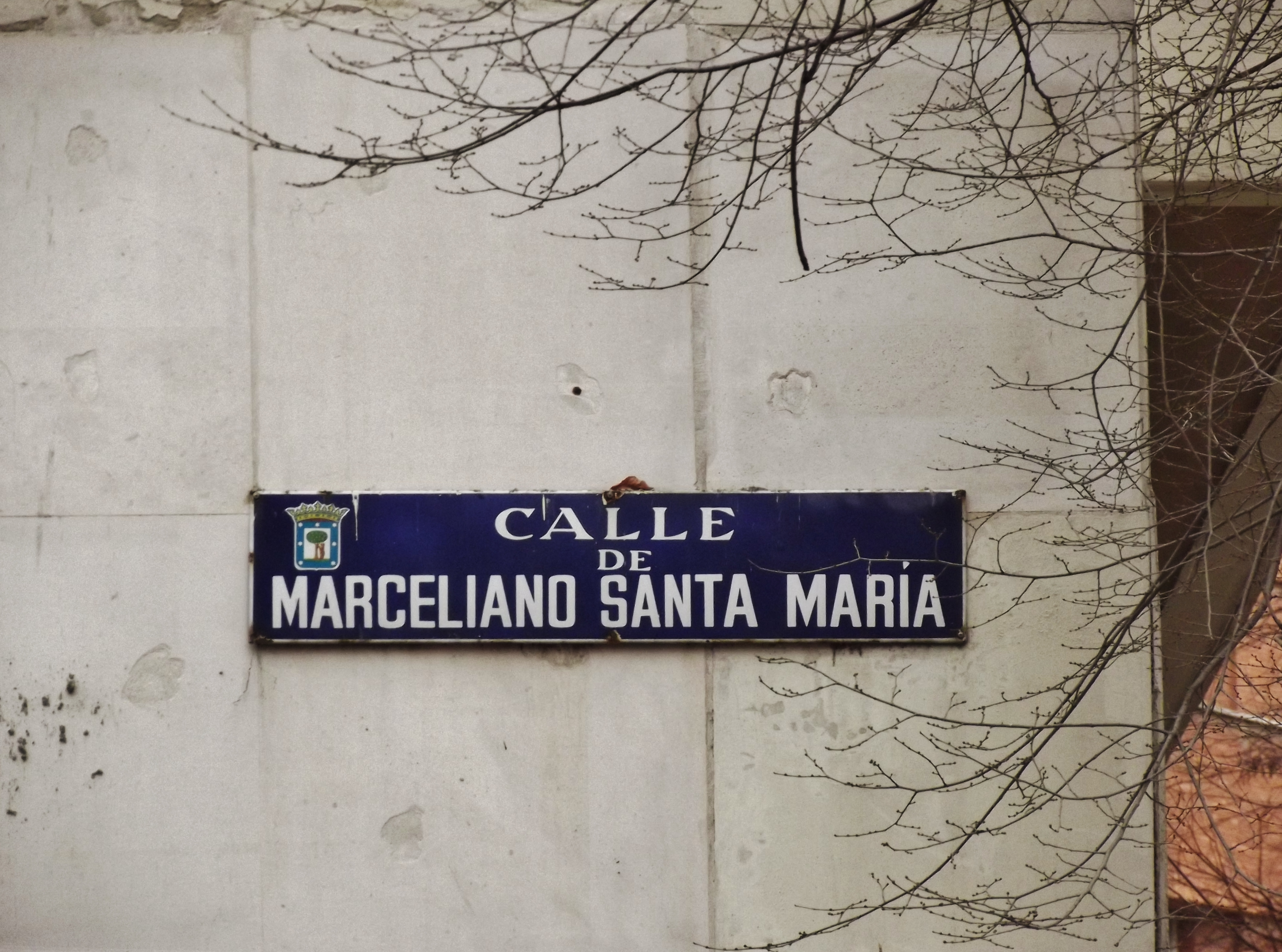
Marceliano Santa María Street in Madrid

In 1934, Marceliano Santa María was appointed director of the Escuela de Artes y Oficios of Madrid. This year, he receives the Medal of Honor at the National Exhibition of Fine Arts. During the Civil War, living in a besieged Madrid, his health worsens and he has to devise solutions to keep painting, since it was impossible to buy proper instruments like paint or canvas. After the Civil War he continued his activity with less intensity, receiving the Extraordinary Gold Medal of the Círculo de Bellas Artes in 1943. He also became, during these years, a mentor, protector and benefactor of young artists such as Luis Sáez Díez. He was recognized also with streets and buildings named on his honor, like Marceliano Santa María promenade, next to Paseo del Espolón in Burgos, a school with his name also in Burgos, Marceliano Santa María street in Madrid (perpendicular to the Santiago Bernabéu Stadium) and other streets in numerous locations, such as in Poza de la Sal.

He died in Madrid on October 12, 1952

== Awards ==
- 1893: Medal Award in the World's Columbian Exhibition of Chicago.
- 1901 and 1910: First Medal Award in the National Exhibition of Madrid.
- 1929: Gold Medal Award in the Iberoamerican Exhibition of Sevilla.
- 1934: Honor Medal Award in the National Exhibition of Madrid.
- 1943: Extraordinary Gold Medal Award of the Círculo de Bellas Artes of Madrid.

=== Marceliano Santa María Museum ===
Interior of the Marceliano Santa María Museum in the Monastery of San Juan Burgos has a monographic museum with Marceliano Santa María's name, dedicated exclusively to his work. Located inside the monastery of San Juan, it was inaugurated on June 29, 1966, with paintings donated by the painter's family. Some of the paintings exhibited in this museum are deposited by the Prado Museum as the work " Paisajes de Castilla".

=== Work in other museums ===
Marceliano Santa María's work can also be found in the Modern Art Museums of Madrid and Barcelona, Municipal Museums of Madrid and Barcelona, Museum of the Royal Academy of Fine Arts of San Fernando de Madrid, Army Museum in Toledo, Foundation Museum Camón Aznar de Zaragoza and other museums in Spain, Europe and America and in numerous private collections.

=== Society membership ===
- Academic member of Real Academia de Bellas Artes de San Fernando of Madrid from 1913, later Chair of Painture Section, President of the Academia Museum and President of y Presidente of América related academies.
- Member of Instituto de España.
- Member of Academia Nacional de Artes y Letras de la Habana.
- Member of Instituto Arqueológico Iberoamericano de Atenas.
- Member of galería cultural da Academia brasileira de Bellas Artes.
- Academic member of Real Academia de Bellas Artes de San Carlos de Valencia.
- Honor academic member Academia burgense Institución Fernán González de Burgos.
- Principal and Chair professor of Escuela de Artes y Oficios Artísticos de Madrid.
- Professor of Instituto de San Isidro de Madrid.
- President of the Asociación de Pintores y Escultores de Madrid.
- Honour president of Círculo de Bellas Artes de Madrid.
- President and jury member of numerous National and International Exhibitions in Madrid.
- President of the Second Congress of Fine Arts.
- President of the X Commission of Cruz Roja Española
- Ambassador of the Real Academia de Bellas Artes de San Fernando in Fortuny centenary in Reus.

== Bibliography ==
- Museo Municipal Marceliano Santa María: catálogo general. Burgos: Ayuntamiento de Burgos, 1981.

== Exhibitions ==
Individual exhibitions

These are some of his most outstanding individual exhibitions:

- 1923: Burgos Theater House.
- 1930: Painter's own study in Madrid
- 1935: Galerías Layetanas in Barcelona
- 1940: Salon Cano in Madrid.
- 1940, 1942 y 1944: Galerías Pallarés in Barcelona.
- 1940, 1941, 1943, 1945, 1947, 1949 y 1951: Círculo de Bellas Artes in Madrid
- 1941: Salon Delclaux in Bilbao
- 1945: Asociación de Escritores y Artistas Españoles in Madrid
- 1948: Burgos Theater House
- 1950: Sala Aranaz Darras in San Sebastián
- 1951: Burgos Pavilion in Madrid

=== Collective exhibitions ===
Marceliano Santa María participated in numerous collective exhibitions, of which the following are noteworthy, due to their importance and the prominent role that his work had in them:

- 1887-1952: National Exhibition of Fine Arts in Madrid (he was present in 24 editions)
- 1893: World's Columbian Exposition of Chicago
- 1894: International Exhibition of Fine Arts in Barcelona
- 1898: Salon (Paris)
- 1912: International Exhibition in Santiago de Chile
- 1919: Hispanic-French Exhibition in Zaragoza
- 1929-1930: Iberoamerican Exhibition de Sevilla
- 1930, 1934, 1935 y 1942: Venice Biennale
- 1936: Casa Whitcomb Exhibition in Buenos Aires
- 1945, 1946 y 1948: Exhibition of artists awarded with the Gold and Honor Medal Award. Organized by the Círculo de Bellas Artes in Madrid
- 1947: Spanish Contemporary Art Exhibition in Buenos Aires
- 1952: First Biennale Hispanoamerican Art Exhibition
