= Mateo Inurria =

Spanish sculptor

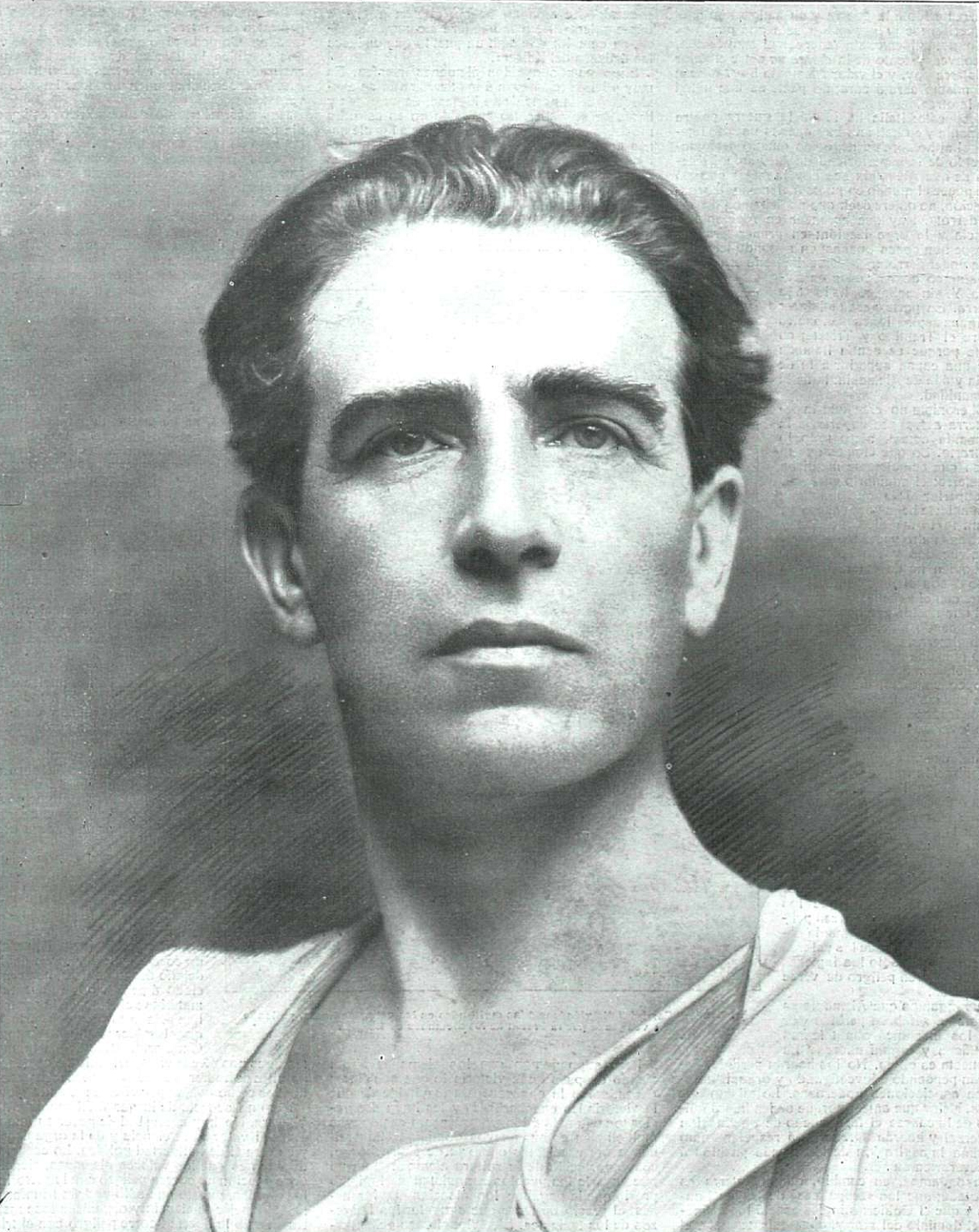
- Mateo Inurria (date of photograph unknown) from La Esfera (1915)
- Born: 25 March 1867
- Died: 21 February 1924 (aged 56)
- Resting place: Cementerio de la Almudena
- Occupation: Sculptor, artist
- Position held: Académico de la Real Academia de Bellas Artes de San Fernando (1921–1924)

Mateo Inurria Lainosa (25 March 1867, Córdoba - 21 February 1924, Madrid) was a Spanish sculptor.

== Biography ==
He began his artistic studies in his father's workshop. Until 1883, he attended the "Escuela Provincial de Bellas Artes" under Rafael Romero Barros. From 1883 to 1885, he studied at the "Escuela Especial de Pintura, Escultura y Grabado" in Madrid.

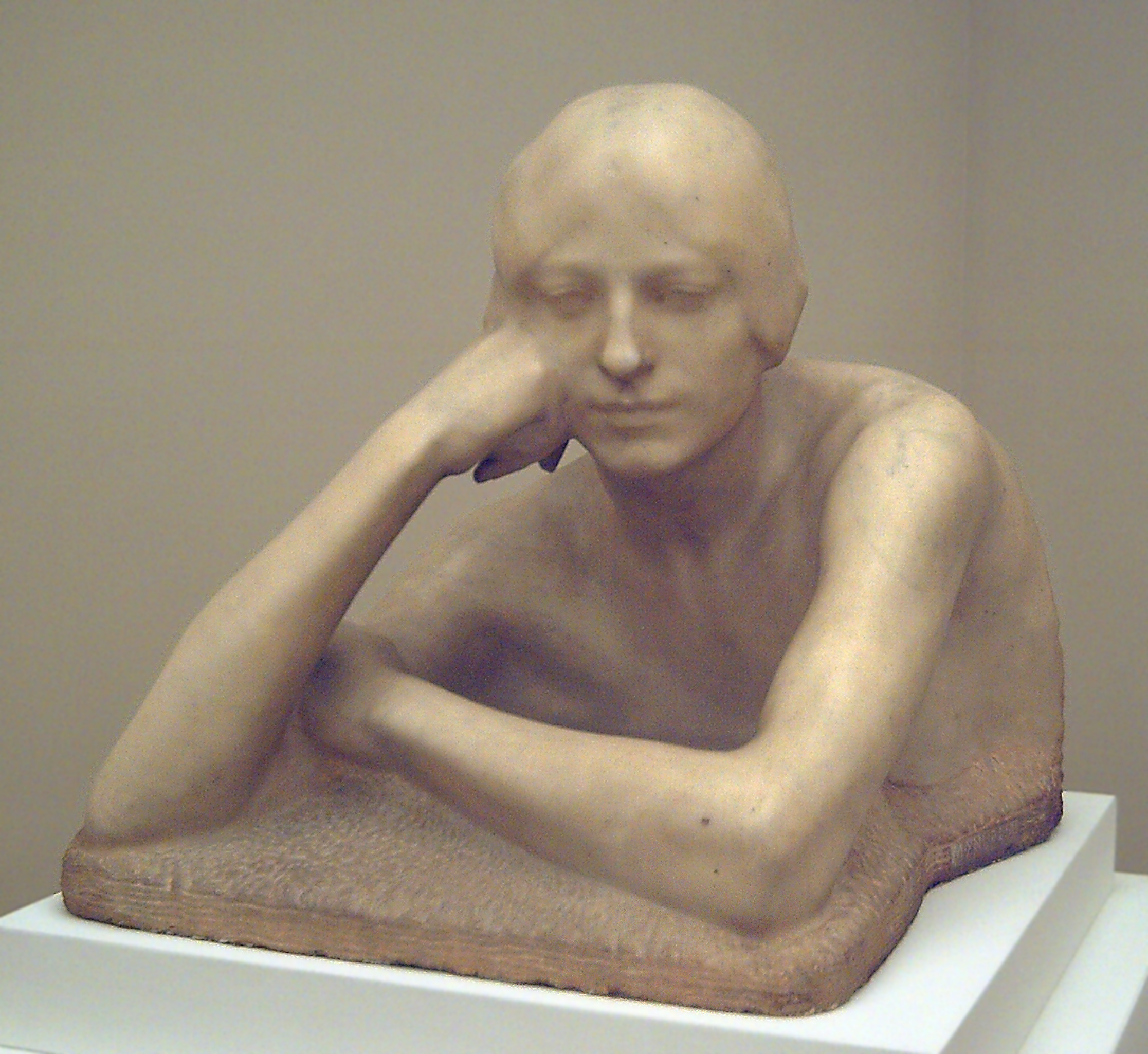
Reverie

His academic achievements were noted by members of the "Diputación Provincial de Córdoba" (the regional government) who granted him a scholarship so he could continue his studies at the Real Academia de Bellas Artes de San Fernando until 1890, when he had his first showing at the National Exhibition of Fine Arts with "The Castaway", which was done so realistically that some jurors suspected it of having been cast from life.

Between 1891 and 1901, he lived in the countryside, oblivious to critics and the public, becoming established as a teacher and art restorer. His many projects included the Mosque–Cathedral of Córdoba and the Medina Azahara. During these years, his work took on greater simplicity and he always spoke of himself as having been self-taught. He produced mostly religious and commemorative sculptures, in Córdoba and Madrid, receiving many commissions to create monuments for local and national celebrities, many of which were not erected. Eventually, he became a professor of modelling and figure drawing at the "Escuela Municipal de Artes y Oficios" (Arts & Crafts) in Córdoba and, in 1901, was appointed Director. From 1905, he was occasionally a member of the jury at the National Exhibition.

In 1911, he was named Professor of modelling and casting at the "Escuela de Artes y Oficios" in Madrid. Now that he was in the capital, he was able to make more connections to promote his work and he concentrated on his preferred theme; idealizing the nude female form. He obtained the gold medal at the National Exhibition in 1920 and, two years later, became an Academician at the Real Academia de Bellas Artes de San Fernando. He died suddenly in 1924. An art school and a major street in Córdoba have been named after him.

== Public monuments ==
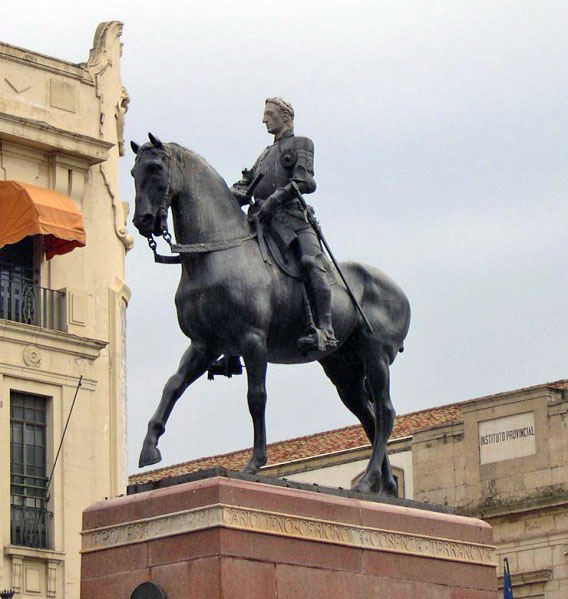
Monument to the Gran Capitán

- Monument to Lope de Vega, 1902, Madrid.
- Group representing the Spanish Navy for the Monument to Alfonso XII, 1905, Madrid.
- Monument to Eduardo Rosales, 1922, Madrid.
- Monument to the "Gran Capitán" (Gonzalo Fernández de Córdoba), 1923, Córdoba.
