= Santovenia =

Coordinates: 41.867°N 5.700°W

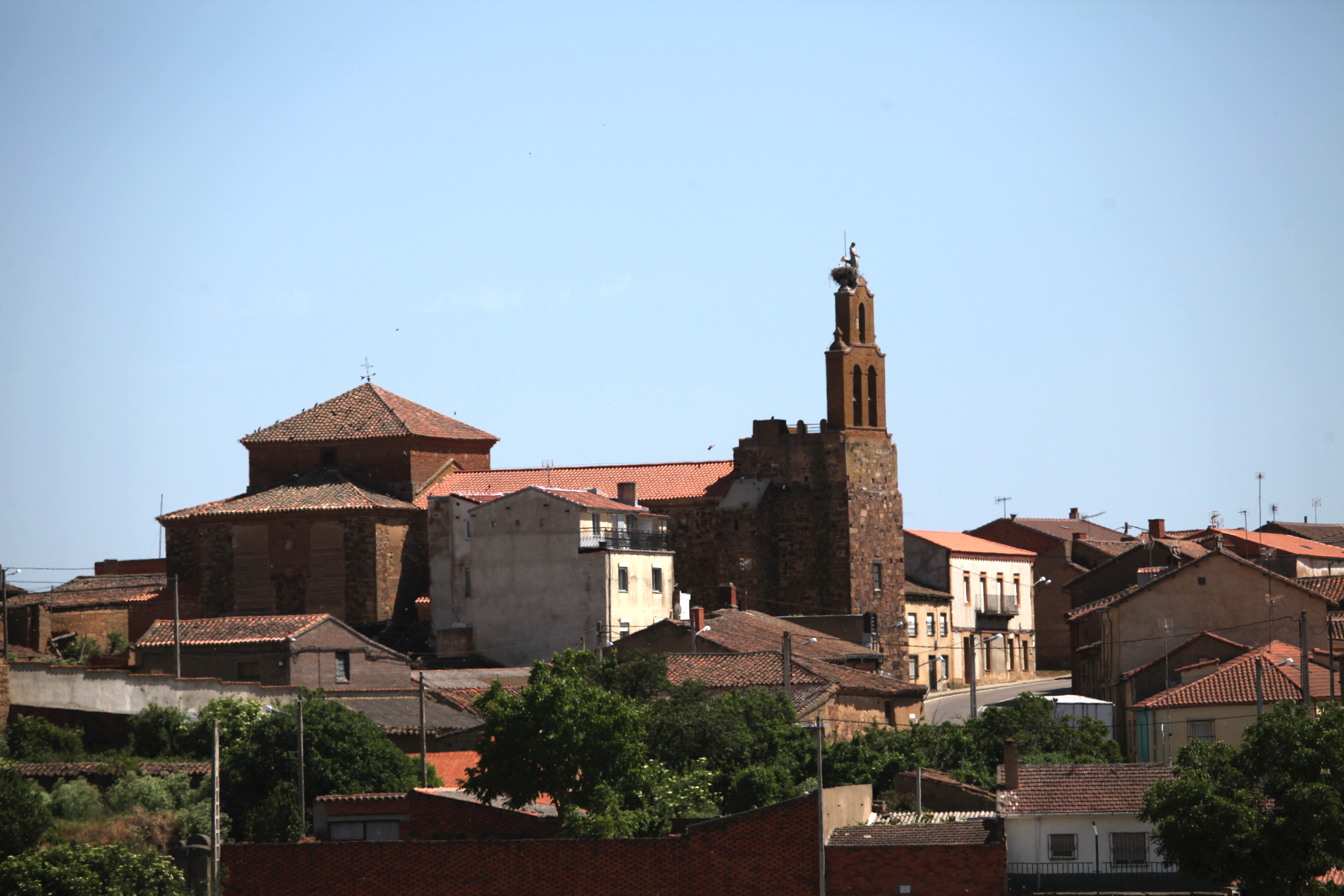

- Flag Coat of arms
- Interactive map of Santovenia
- Country: Spain
- Autonomous community: Castile and León
- Province: Zamora
- Municipality: Santovenia

Area
  - Total: 32 km^{2} (12 sq mi)

Population (2025-01-01)
  - Total: 219
  - Density: 6.8/km^{2} (18/sq mi)
- Time zone: UTC+1 (CET)
  - Summer (DST): UTC+2 (CEST)

Santovenia is a municipality located in the province of Zamora, Castile and León, Spain. According to the 2004 census (INE), the municipality has a population of 367 inhabitants.
