= Rafael Romero Barros =

Spanish painter

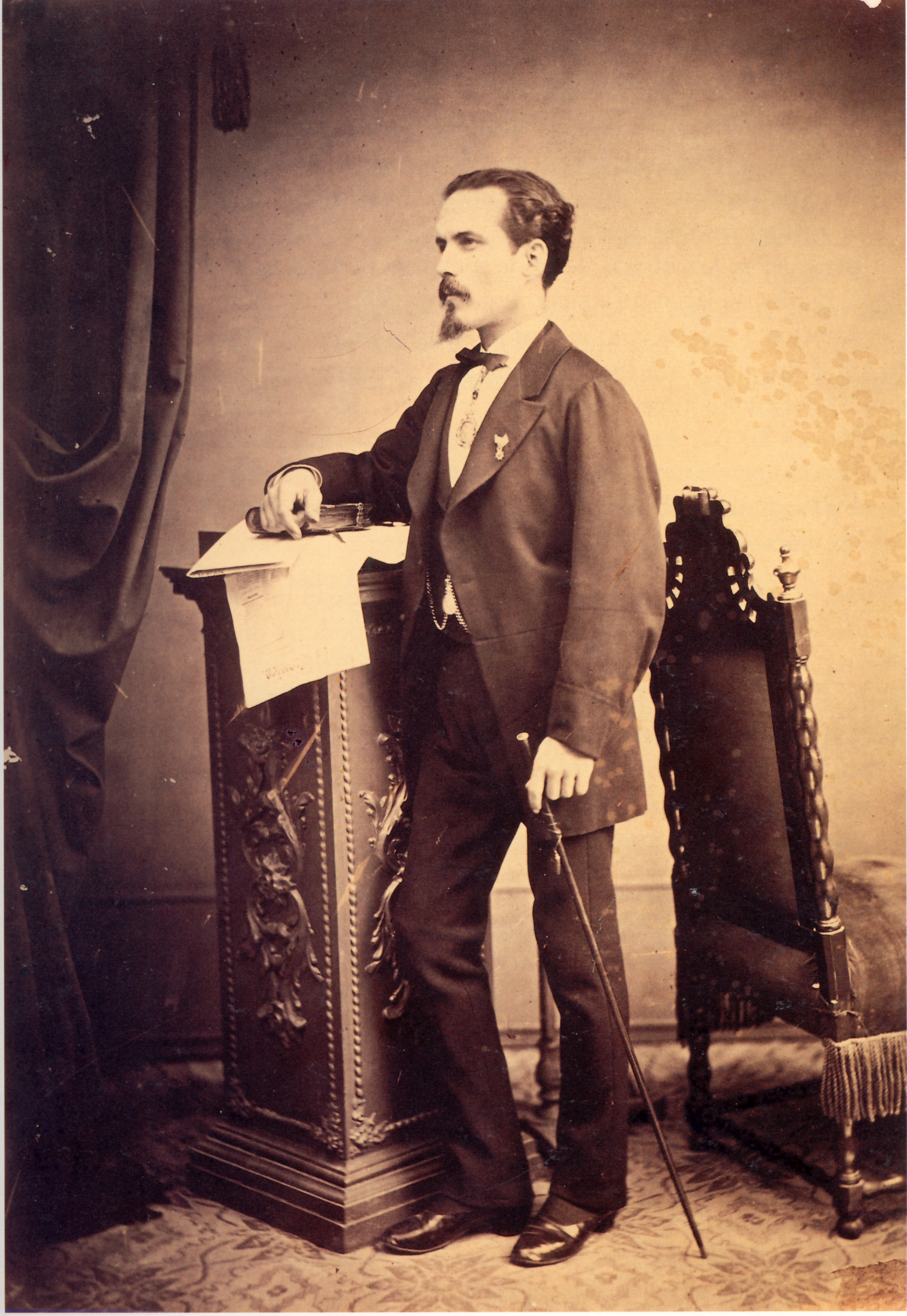
- Rafael Romero (c.1865)
- Born: 30 May 1832; Moguer, Spain
- Died: 2 December 1895 (aged 63); Córdoba, Spain
- Education: Seville
- Known for: Art restorer, writer
- Movement: Orientalist; Costumbrista
- Spouse: Rosario de Torres Delgado
- Children: 8, including: Rafael Romero de Torres; Enrique Romero de Torres; Julio Romero de Torres; Ángela Romero de Torres

Rafael Romero Barros (30 May 1832, Moguer - 2 December 1895, Córdoba) was a Spanish painter who often worked in the Costumbrismo style.

== Biography ==
He was born into a humble working-class family. When he was only a few months old, his parents moved to Seville to find employment. At the age of twelve, he began to study at the "Universidad Literaria de Sevilla", where he showed some talent as a writer, producing works on art and literature. It was also there that he had his first art lessons and became serious about an artistic career. Raphael and the English landscape painters were among his first influences.

In 1862, he moved to Córdoba to manage the "Museo Provincial de Pintura". Over the next few years, he founded the "Escuela de Música" and the "Escuela Provincial de Bellas Artes". He also organized and directed the "Museo Arqueológico y Etnológico de Córdoba" and remained active as an author, contributing prolifically to the local newspapers and magazines. In addition to his cultural work, he was a lifetime member of the "Asociación de Obreros Cordobeses", a labor union, where he served as secretary.

Equally significant, perhaps, was his work as an art restorer. In his museum workshop, he restored paintings by Juan de Valdés Leal, Antonio del Castillo y Saavedra and many others, including the image of the "Virgen de Linares", from the Thirteenth Century. His interest in archaeology naturally led him to work for preservation as well as restoration. He was especially concerned about works of Arab and Jewish origin, which were being ignored or vandalized, so he formed an alliance with Father Fidel Fita, a distinguished historical scholar who helped him with transcriptions. His efforts were crowned by an appointment to a seat on the "Comisión de Monumentos de Córdoba".

Romero was married to Rosario de Torres Delgado, with whom he had eight children. The couple's children included the painters Rafael, Enrique and Julio, and the archaeologist and curator Ángela Romero de Torres.

== Selected paintings ==
His works, especially the later canvases, are classified as Costumbrista, although they often lack the anecdotal character typical of the genre. Many show the influence of Bartolomé Esteban Murillo.

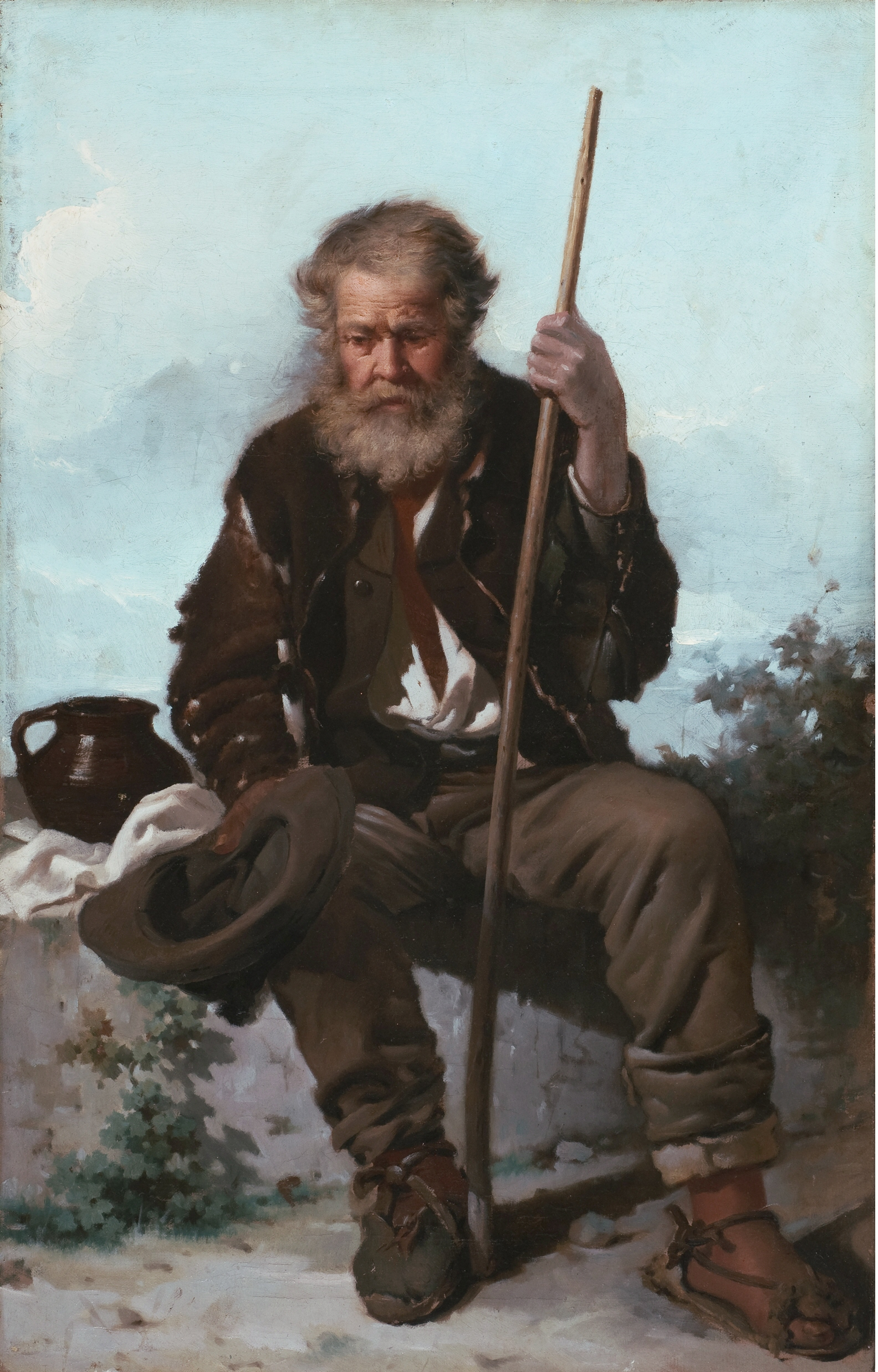
Beggar

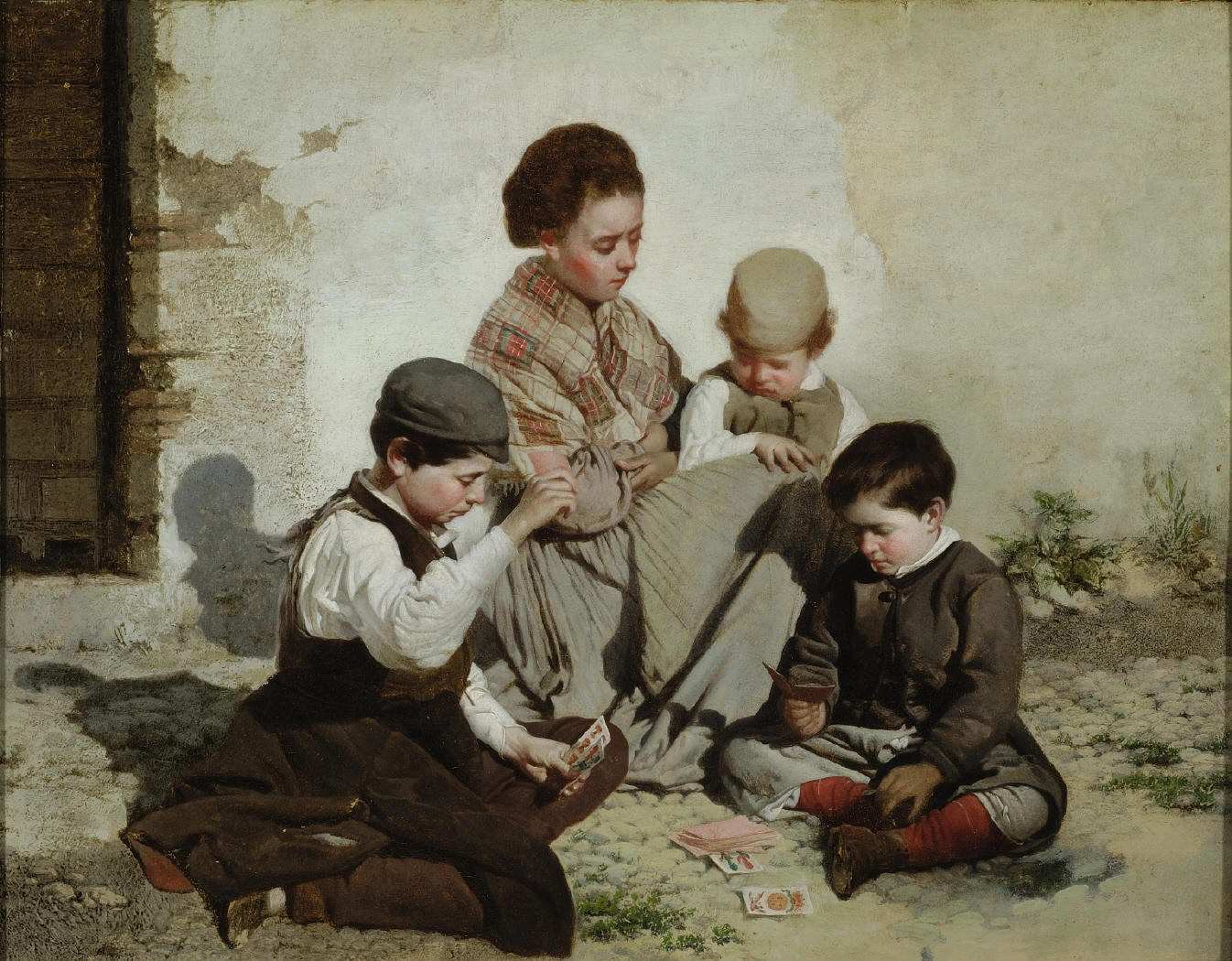
Children Playing Cards

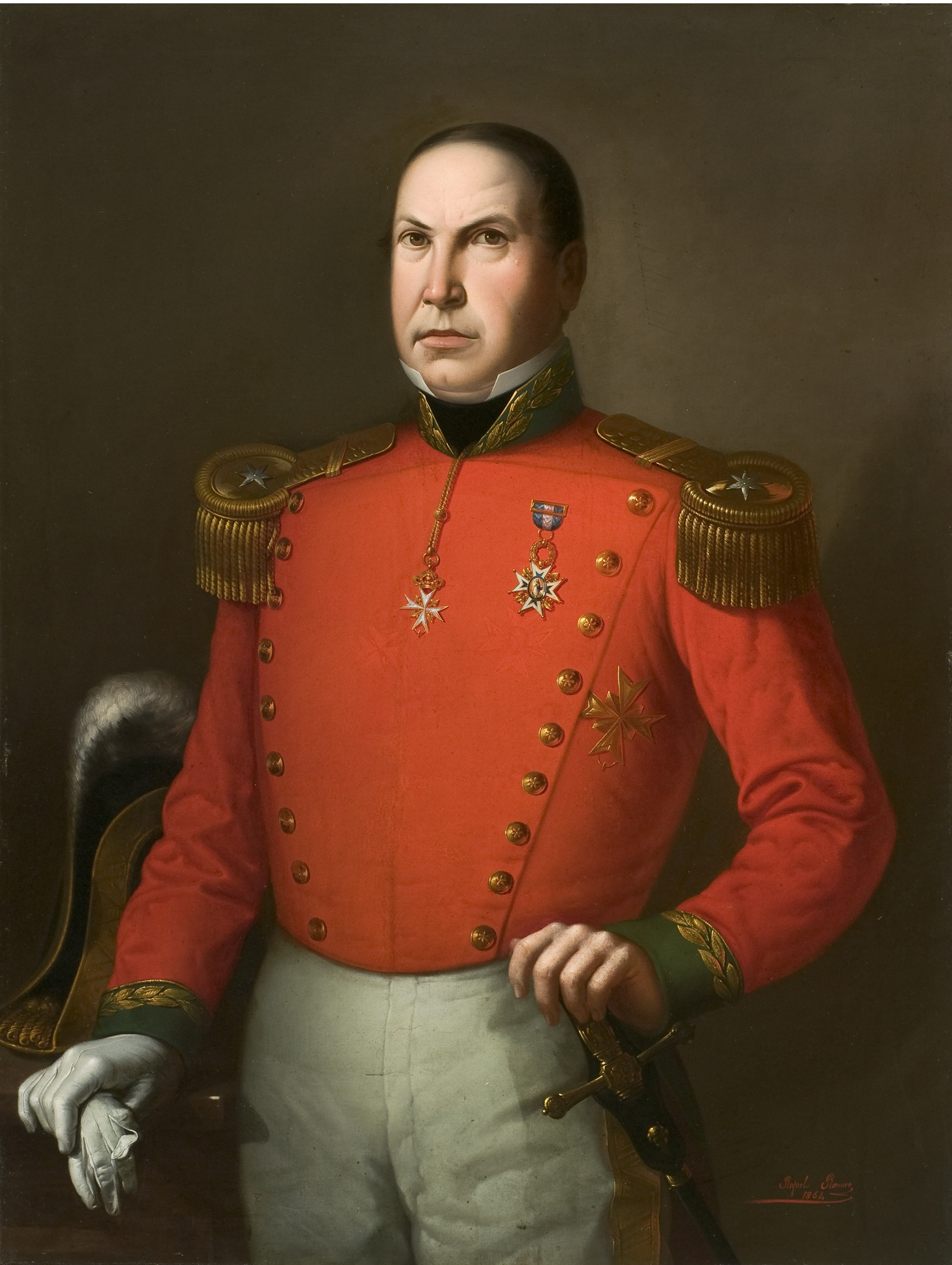
The Count of Cañete
de las Torres

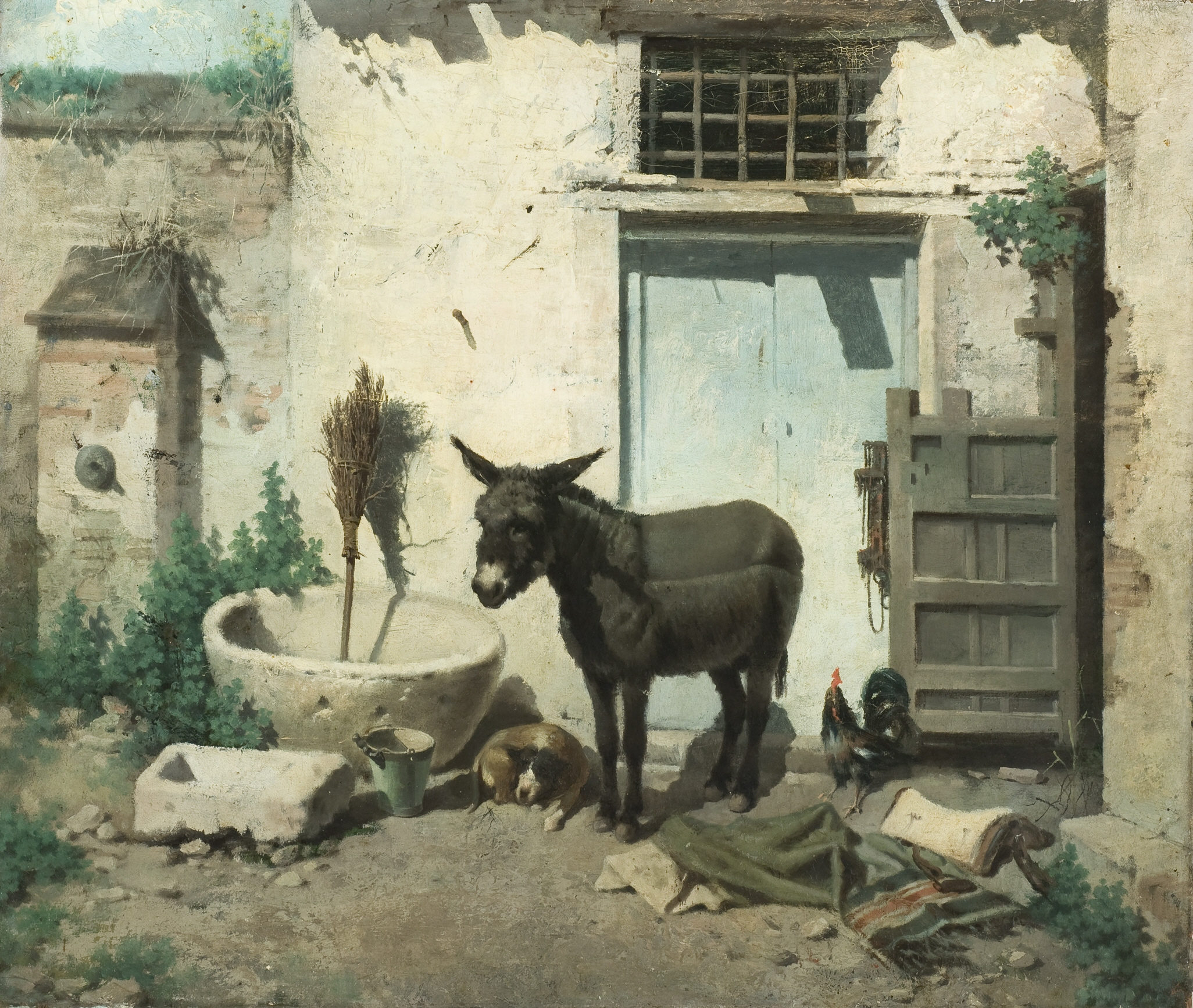
A Corner of the Old Charity Hospital

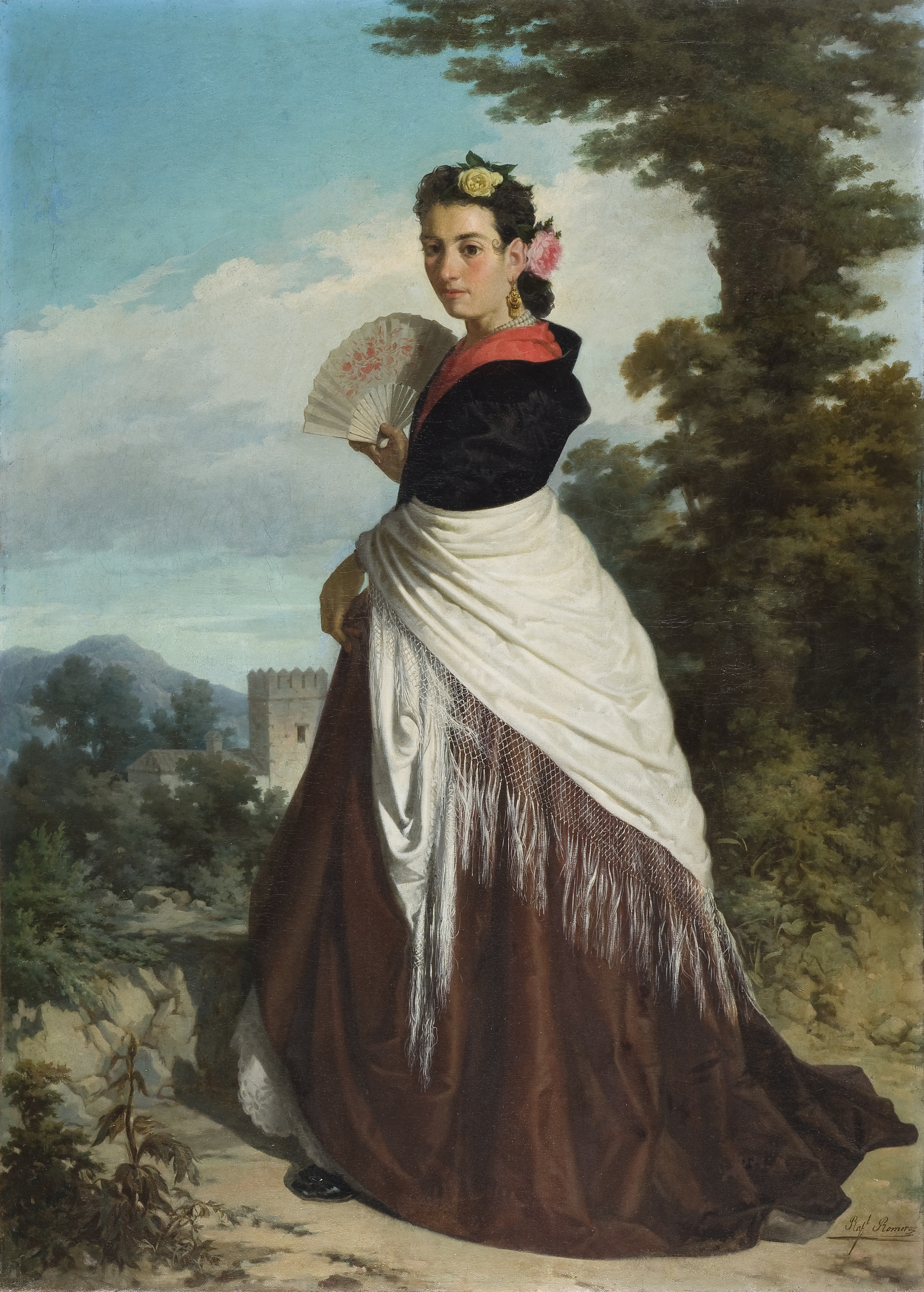
Maja
