= Julio Romero de Torres =

Spanish painter (1874–1930)

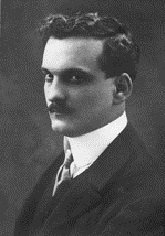
- Photograph, c.1895-1905
- Born: Julio Romero de Torres; 9 November 1874; Córdoba, Spain
- Died: 10 May 1930 (aged 55); Córdoba, Spain
- Education: Rafael Romero Barros (father), Fine Arts Museum of Córdoba
- Notable work: Amor místico y amor profano (1920); Naranjas y limones (1927); La chiquita piconera (1930)
- Movement: Symbolism

Julio Romero de Torres (9 November 1874 – 10 May 1930) was a Spanish painter. His brothers, Rafael and Enrique, also became painters. He created deeply Spanish art, and came to be influenced by modernism and the Generation of '98. As his career progressed, he turned towards personal art, which combined popular culture, folklore and Andalusian art. In his early days, he attempted to reflect a dramatic, rural Spain in his paintings.

Romero de Torres stood out for his precise paintings, which balanced black, blue and greenish colours.

== Biography ==
He was the son of Rafael Romero Barros, a painter who served as Director of the Fine Arts Museum of Córdoba. One of eight siblings, Romero was the brother of the painters Rafael and Enrique and the archaeologist and curator Ángela Romero de Torres. When he was ten, he began his apprenticeship with his father at the School Of Fine Arts. His first known works, Head of an Arab and On Horseback, date from 1889. Two years later, he was providing illustrations for the Diario de Córdoba.

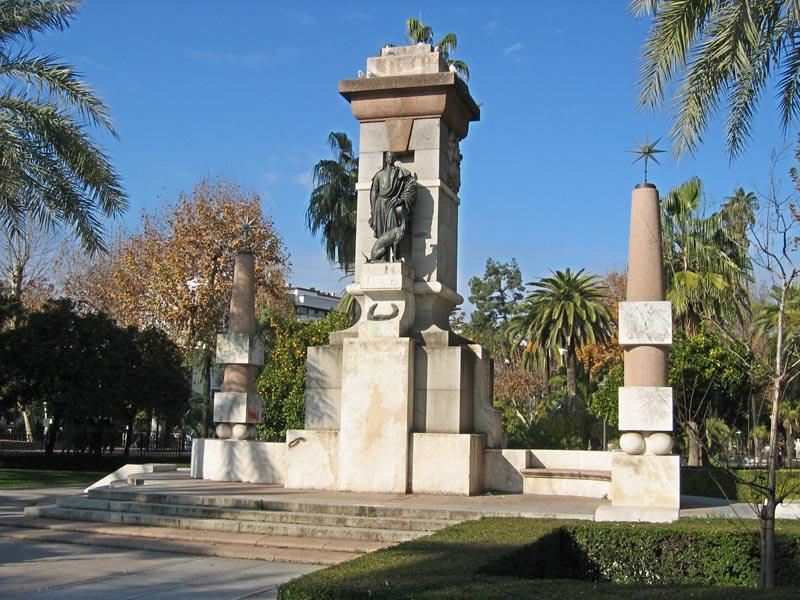
Monument to Romero in Córdoba (1940), by Juan Cristóbal González

In 1895, he had his first showing at the National Exhibition of Fine Arts, where he received honorable mention. Although he attempted to win a scholarship to the Spanish Academy in Rome in 1897, he was unsuccessful. The following year, his brother Rafael died, aged only thirty-three. He participated in the 1899 National Exhibition, being awarded a third-class medal. It was then that he began teaching at the art school and married Francisca Pellicer López, who was also from a family of artists. He was named a Professor at the school in 1903.

During these years, he travelled extensively, visiting Italy, France, England, and the Low Countries. At the National Exhibition of 1906, his entry, Nurseries of Love (depicting prostitution), was rejected for being immoral, but received more attention from the public than the winning entries. At the Exhibition of 1908, he was awarded a first-class medal for his Gypsy Muse. In 1912, his work went unrecognized again, but his admirers presented him with his own gold medal, sculpted by Julio Antonio. After being snubbed at the Exhibition of 1915, he stopped participating, but chose to settle in Madrid. In 1916, he became a Professor of "Antique Drawing and Clothing" at the Real Academia de Bellas Artes de San Fernando.

He represented the Academia at numerous international exhibitions, but his greatest success came in 1922 when he went to Buenos Aires with his brother Enrique to open a showing at the Witcomb Gallery. His presentation included a catalog written by the famous author, Ramón del Valle-Inclán, and was a resounding success. Shortly after, he was elected a full member of the Real Academia, and the academy in Córdoba.

By 1928, his health was visibly declining and his doctors advised him to take a long rest. Exhausted from overwork and liver disease, he returned to his hometown in 1930 to recuperate, but continued to work. He left two paintings unfinished when he died at the age of fifty-five. Much of the city turned out to mourn.

== Selected paintings ==
The Museum of Julio Romero de Torres at his former residence in Córdoba houses examples of his works, as well as works by Francisco Zurbarán, Alejo Fernández, Antonio del Castillo, and Valdés Leal. Some of his important works at the museum include Amor místico y amor profano, El Poema de Córdoba, Marta y María, La saeta, Cante hondo, La consagración de la copla, Carmen, and La chiquita piconera.

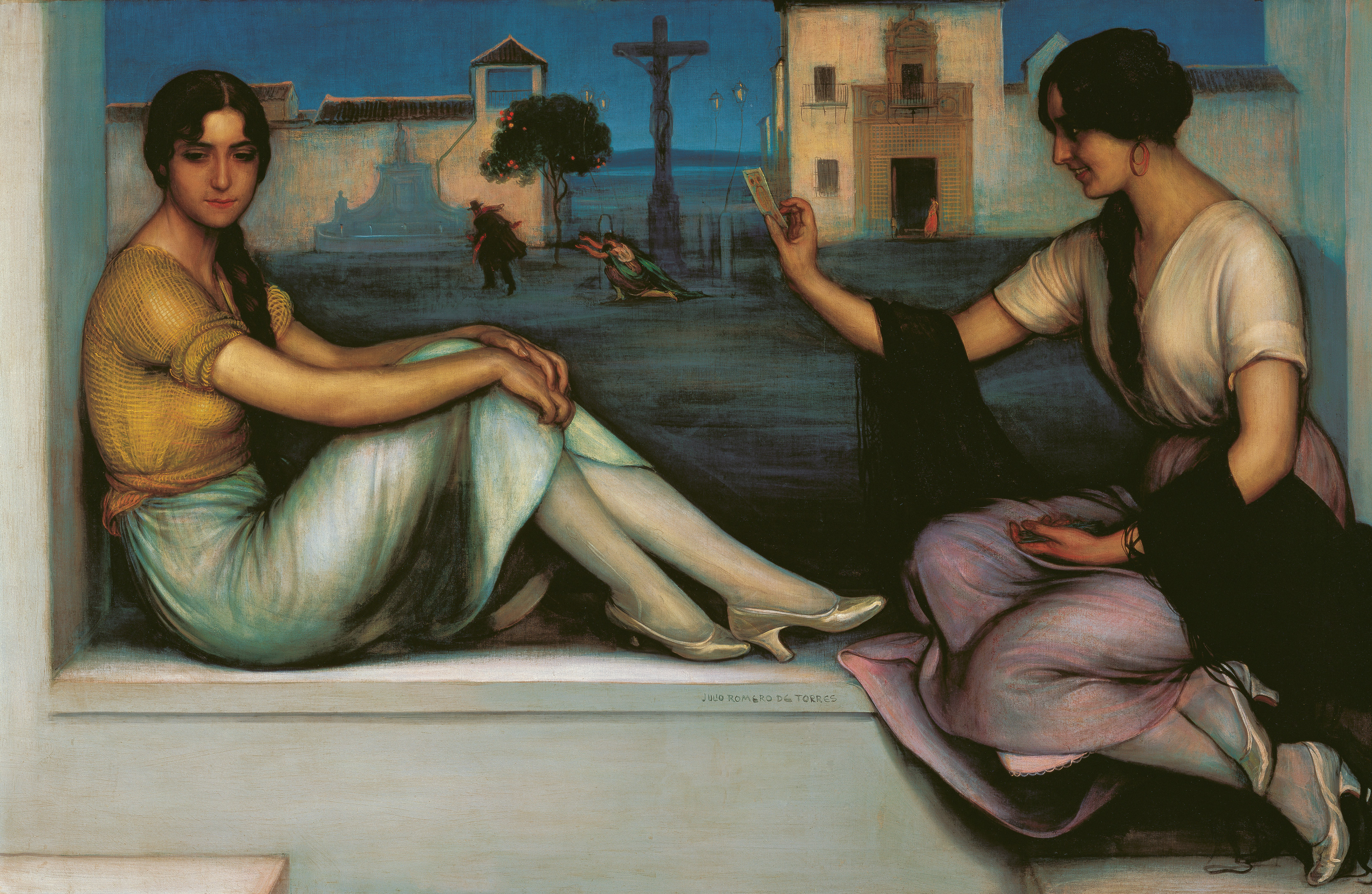
Fate

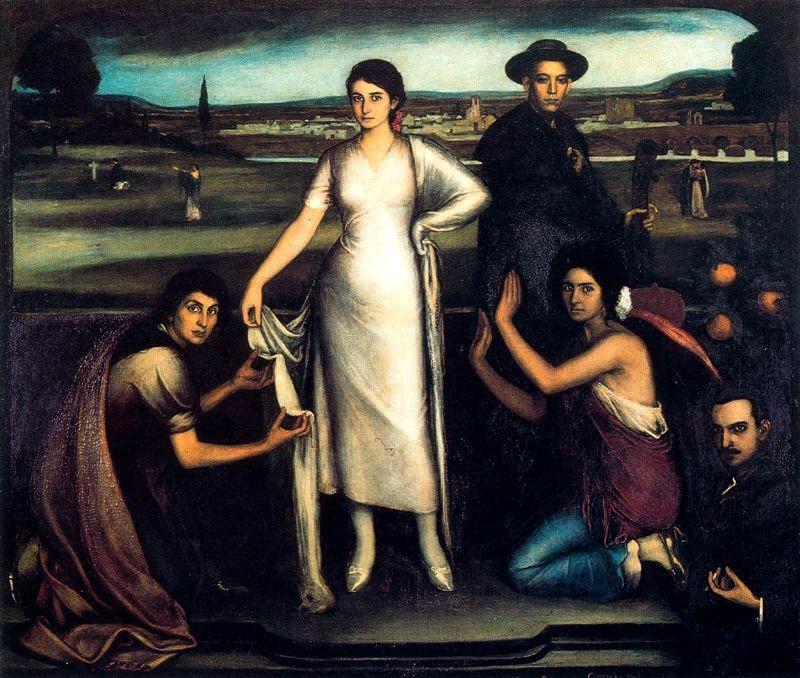
Nuestra Señora de Andalucía

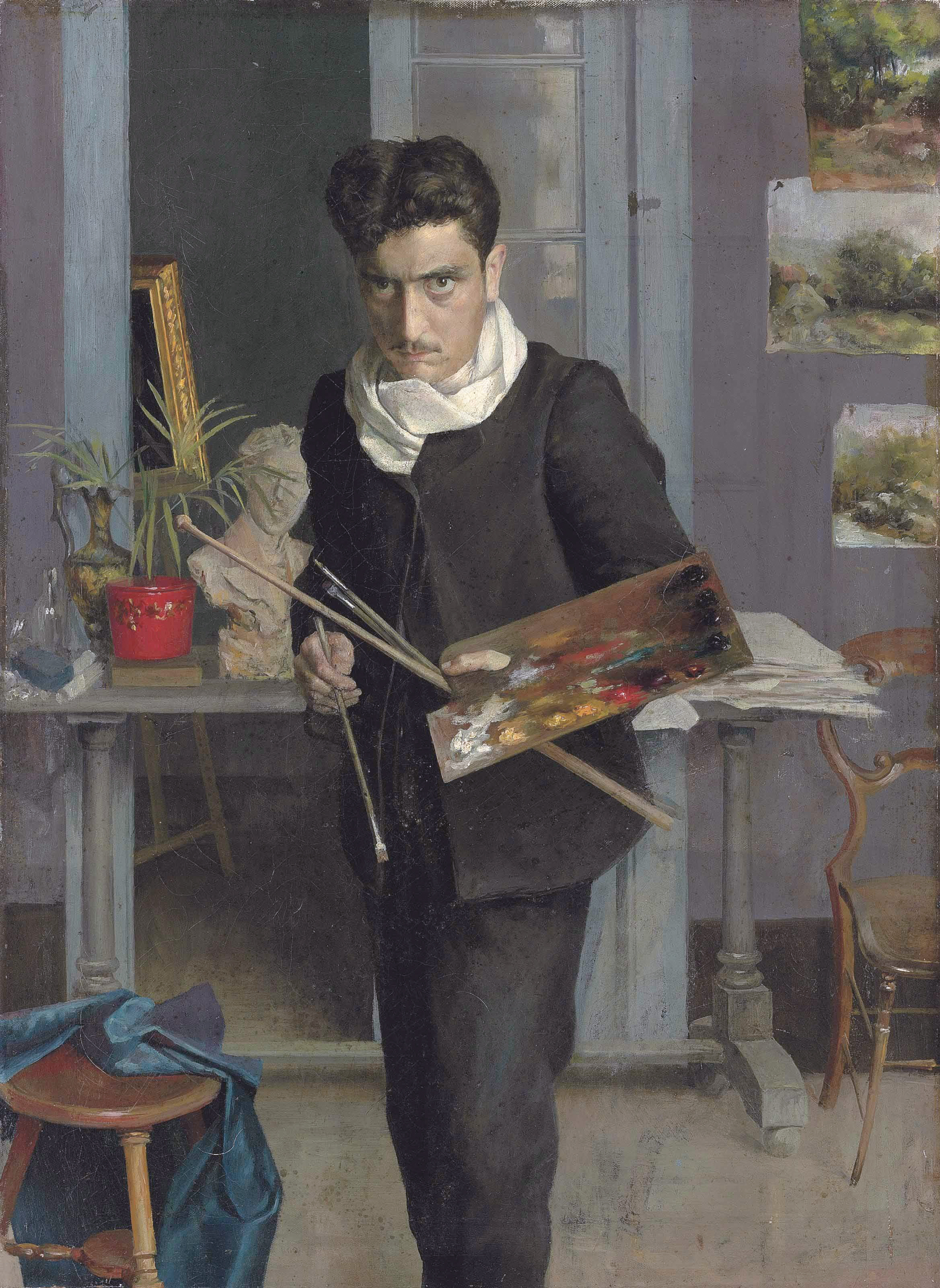
Self-portrait (c.1905)

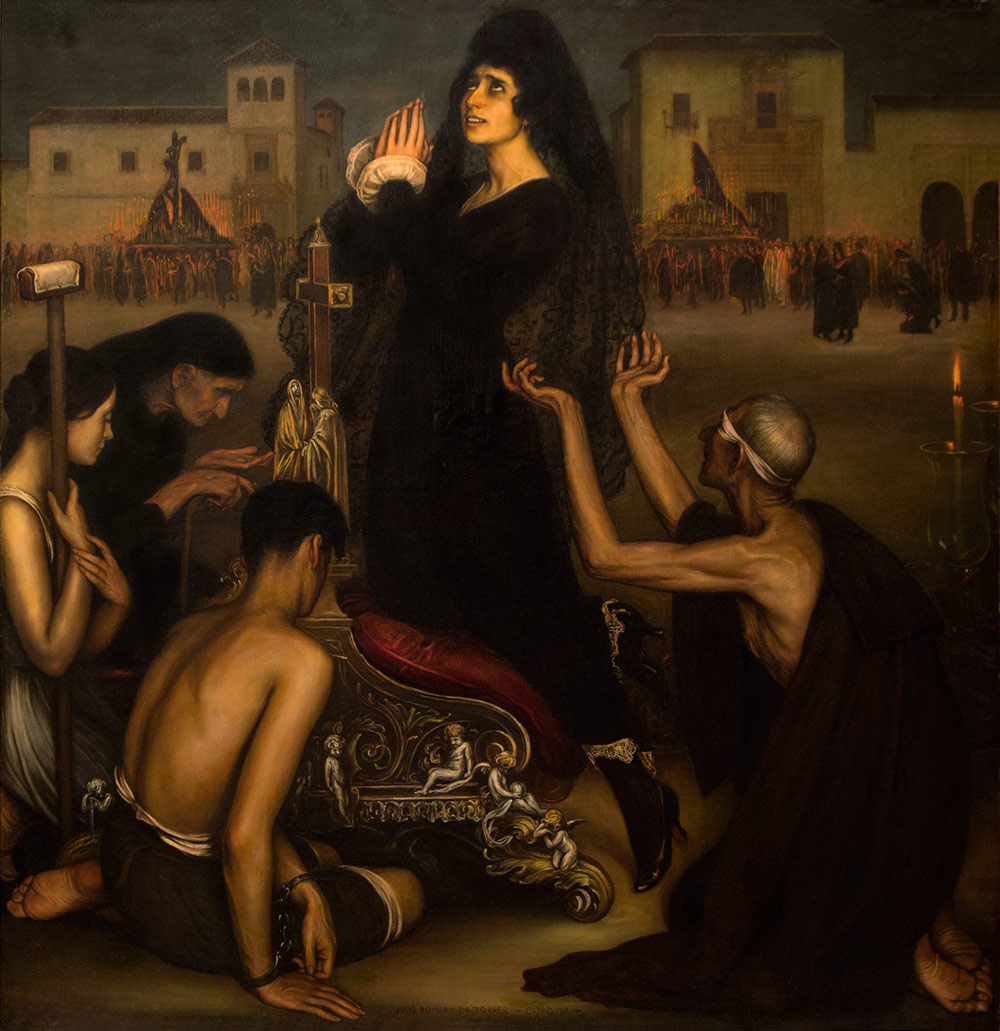
La Saeta

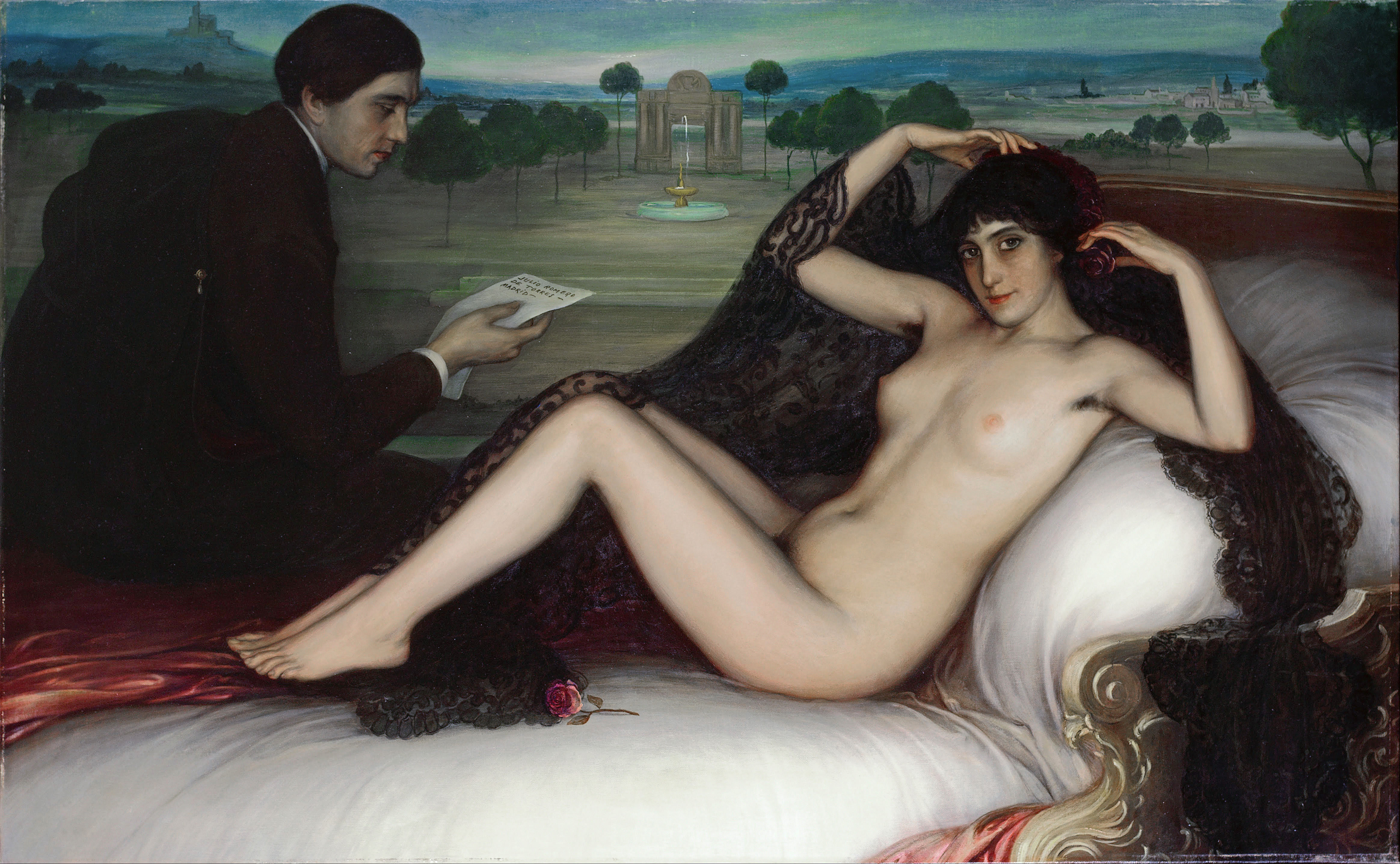
The Venus of Poetry

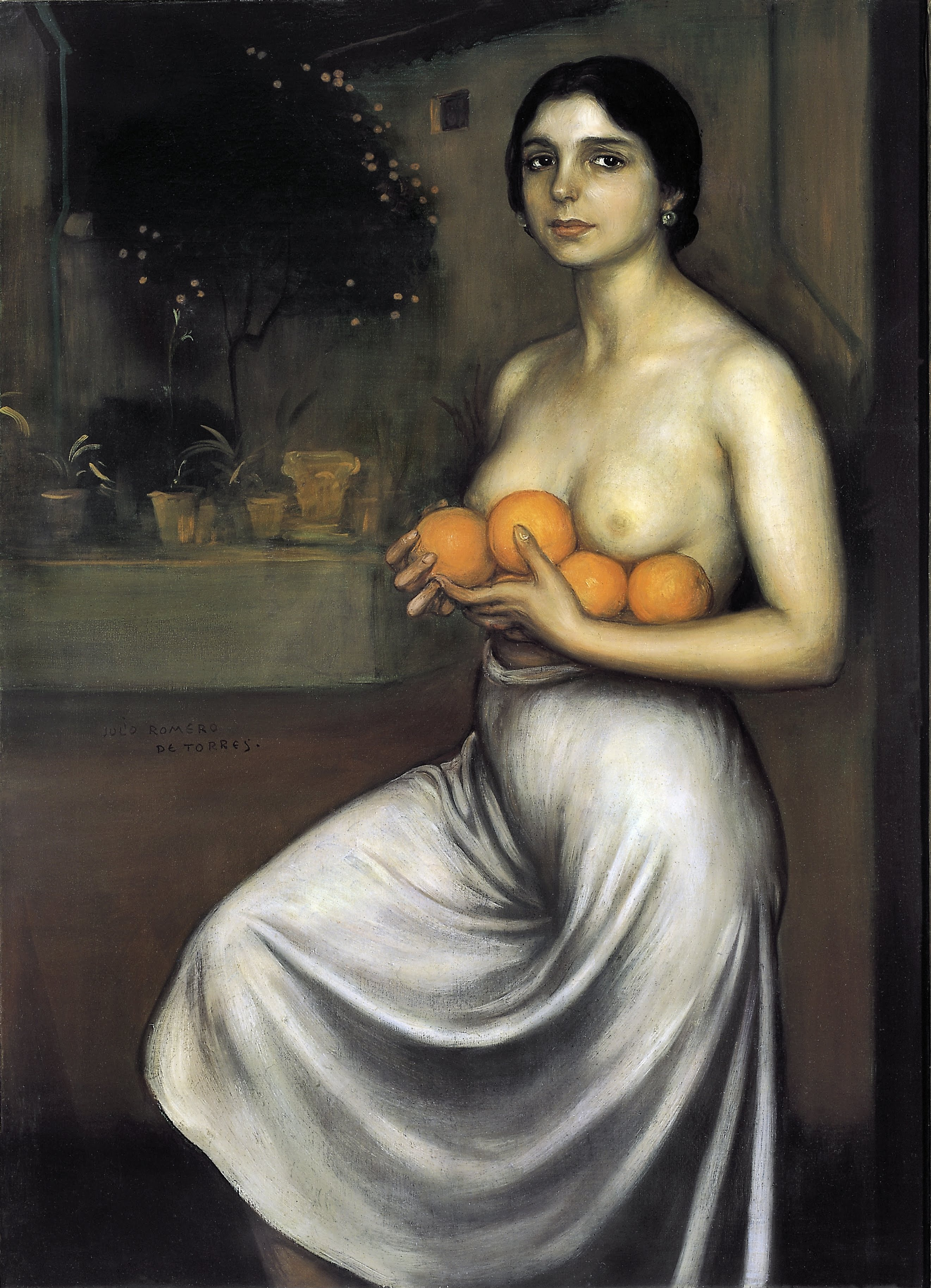
Oranges and Lemons

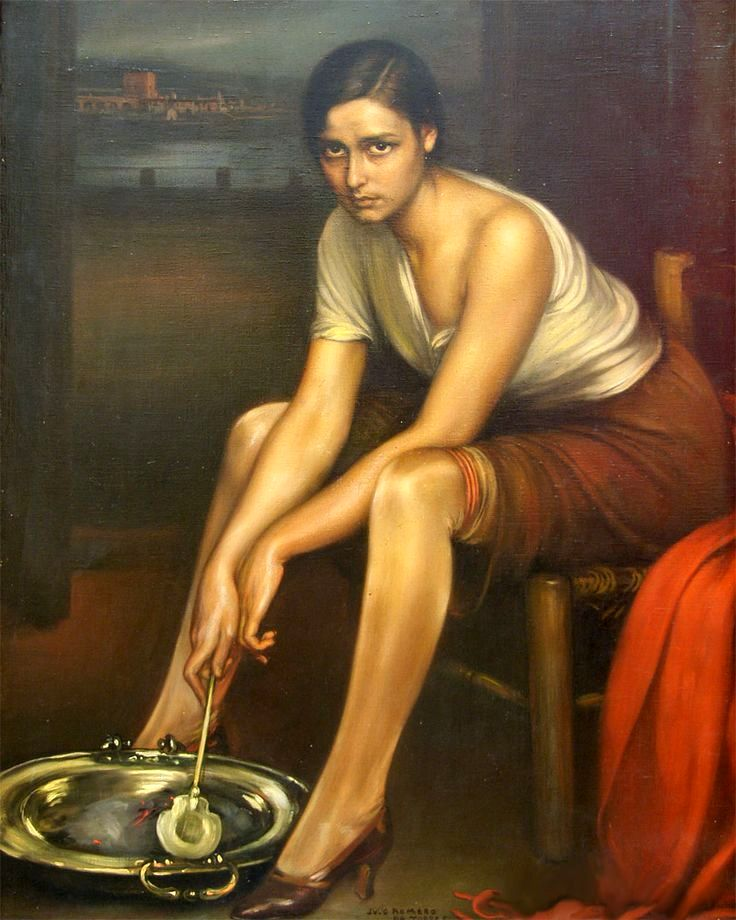
La chiquita piconera

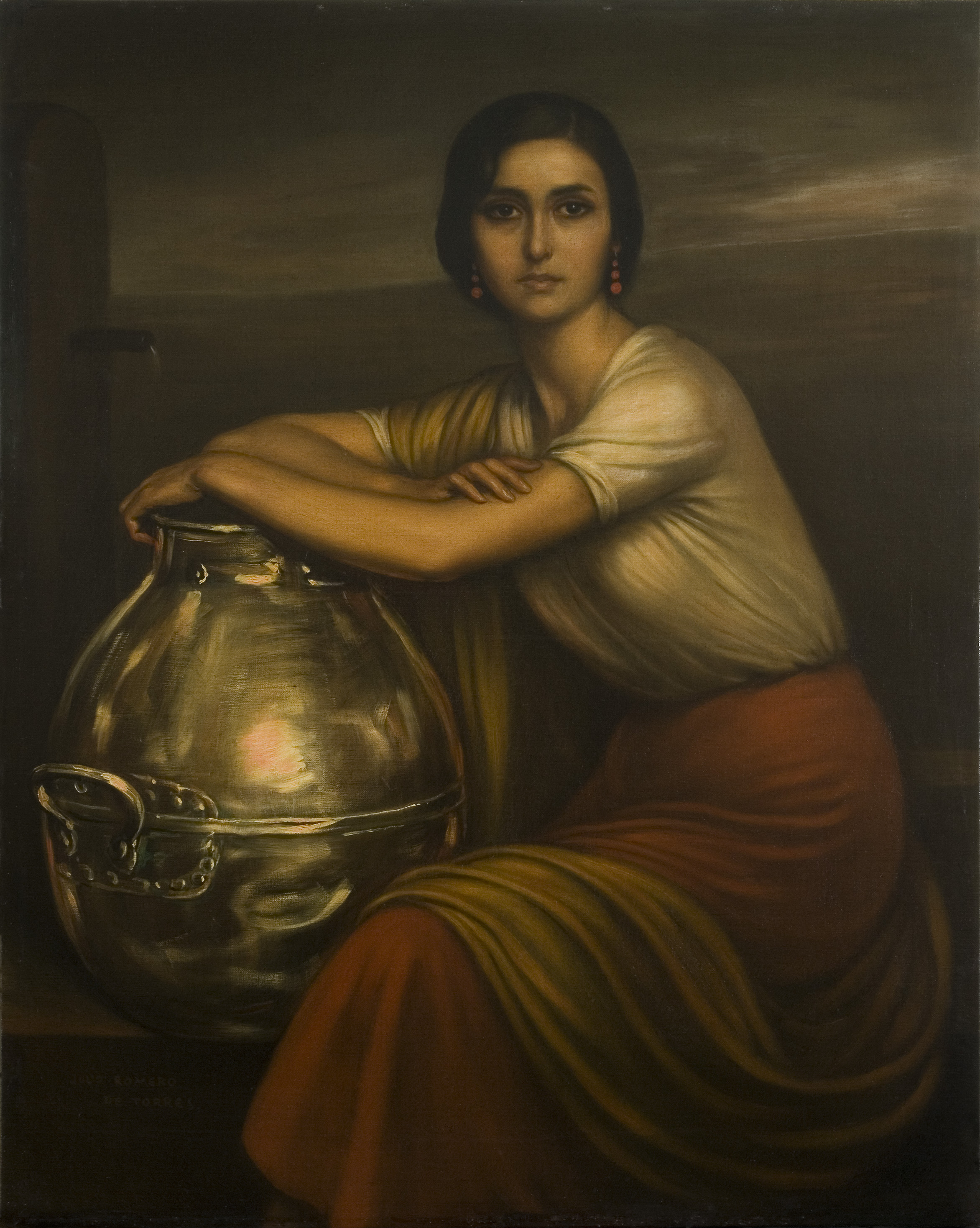
La Fuensanta

== Sources ==
- Ramón Pérez de Ayala, "Julio Romero de Torres, pintor" and "Romero de Torres en la Argentina", in: Ramón Pérez de Ayala y las artes plásticas, exhibition catalog, Granada, Fundación Rodríguez-Acosta, 1991 ISBN 978-84-604-0750-8
- Francisco Calvo Serraller, "La hora de iluminar lo negro: tientos sobre Julio Romero de Torres", in: Julio Romero de Torres (1874-1930), exhibition catalog, Fundación Cultural Mapfre Vida, 1993.
- Francisco Zueras Torrent, Julio Romero de Torres, su vida y su mundo, Córdoba, Ayuntamiento, Delegación de Cultura, 1974.
