= Julio Romero de Torres Museum =

Museum in Córdoba, Spain

Coordinates: 37.88133°N 4.77485°W

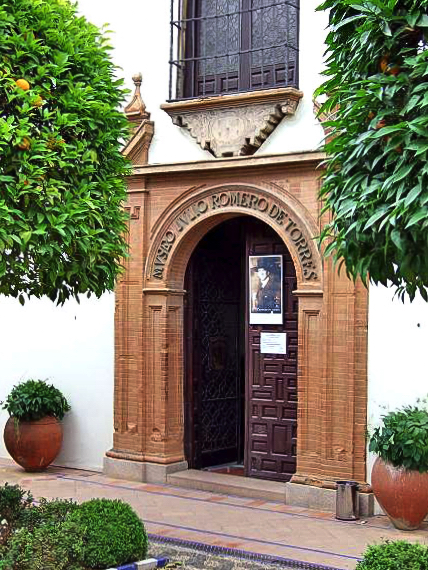
- Entrance to the museum.
- Established: November 23, 1931
- Location: Córdoba
- Visitors: 56.239 (2016)
- Website: Website

The Julio Romero de Torres Museum is a museum located in the city of Córdoba, Spain, which is notable for containing the largest collection of the famous Cordoban painter Julio Romero de Torres. It is located in the building of the old Hospital of la Caridad, which also houses the Museum of Fine Arts of Córdoba. The museum has been declared a Bien de Interés Cultural in the category of monument since 1962.

== History ==
After the death of Julio Romero de Torres on May 10, 1930, Francisca Pellicer, widow of the painter, and their children, Rafael, Amalia and María, decided to create a museum dedicated to the memory of the artist, bequeathing it to the city of Córdoba. So, on November 23, 1931, the museum was created and inaugurated by the president of the republic, Niceto Alcalá Zamora. In 1934, the adjoining house was purchased, and the current museum was inaugurated on May 24, 1936. The last remodeling dates back to 1992, for the installation of lighting and security systems, as well as for the renovation of part of the structures of the museum.

The Order of July 7, 1997, agrees the entry of this museum in the Register of Museums of Andalusia (BOJA 91 of August 7, 1997).

The Decision of February 25, 1998 of the General Directorate of Historical Heritage Institutions publishes the list of museums registered and annotated preventively in the Registry of Museums of Andalusia, among which is found in: BOJA 38 of April 4, 1998.

With the Resolution of December 19, 2001, a subsidy of 1,200,000 Spanish pesetas (€7,212.15) is granted. (BOJA 20 February 16, 2002).

In June 2005, the museum closed its doors for its renovation, as well as for the restoration of the Hospital de la Caridad, which owns the building where the museum is. On January 24, 2012, the museum reopened its doors, receiving in its first 5 days almost 5.000 visitors.

== Exhibition halls ==
=== Exhibition Hall 1 ===
Julio Romero de Torres shared the French poster movement as an advertising medium, and he conducted a series of works whereby he was integrated into the new movement.

In Cordoba, he painted La Feria del ganado of 1897, Ferias y Fiestas of 1902, and La Feria de Nuestra Señora de la Salud of 1905, 1912, 1913 and 1916. The Winery Cruz-Conde commissioned him the advertisement of their wines and the popular Anisette labels "La Cordobesa".

In Madrid, he made the poster of La corrida patriótica in 1921 for the benefit of the victims of the Battle of Annual, and he made for the Spanish Explosives Factory Riotinto four calendar posters of 1924, 1925, 1929 and the one published in 1931.

The museum preserves original paintings in which the artist had the knowledge to combine the modernist influences with the aspects of his homeland. This room in the museum's vestibule is completed by several display cabinets with publications, manuscripts and tickets dedicated to the painter.

=== Exhibition Hall 2 ===
The circumstances that surrounded the painter are present in this room, which is dedicated to his memory. It contains photographic reproductions of his parents and siblings of their family house in Cordoba, of the painter's studio in Madrid, and of the successes achieved in 1922 in Argentina at the Witcomb Gallery in Buenos Aires.

Furniture that accompanied him all his life: bargueños, ceramics, copper utensils that were frequent motifs on his canvases. His guitar, cape and hat can be seen in the display cabinet, his paintings, palette and brushes, and the issuance of stamps in homage to his figure, introduce us to the world of this creator.

Some representative works, in line with social painting, that marked his first steps in painting are: Look how pretty she was!, awarded with the Honorable Mention in the National Exhibition of 1895; Hours of distress, a drawing of great dimensions. And, finally, a portrait of Maria Teresa Lopez with a nun's habit, which is his last unfinished work left on the easel. All these works set us in his living scene.

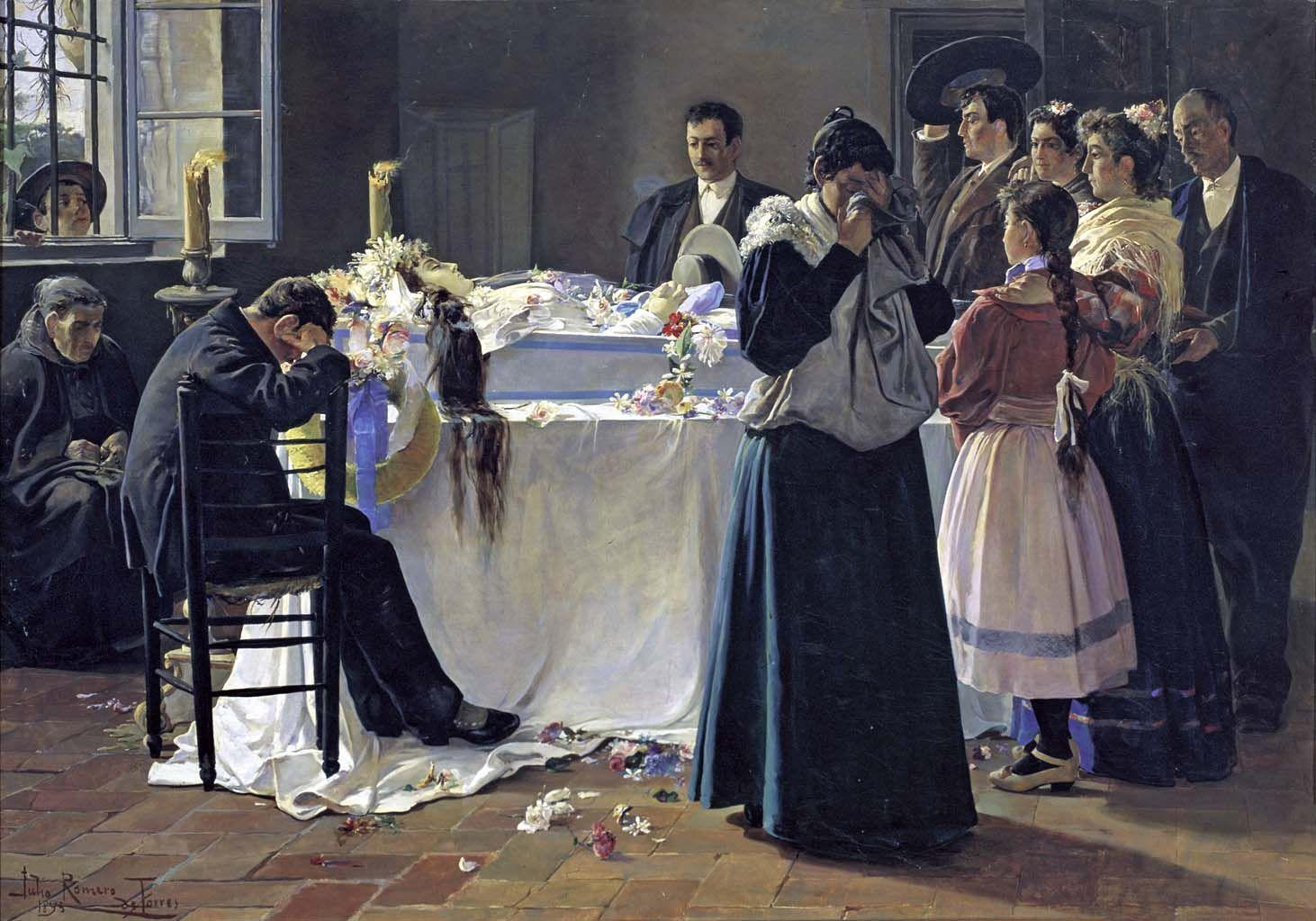
Look how pretty she was! (1895)

=== Exhibition Hall 3 ===
This exhibition hall is dedicated to women and it gathers much of the most archetypal paintings of his career: La chiquita piconera, Romero de Torres's most famous painting; Viva el pelo, La Copla, which were painted during his last years of life.

Female nude is the predominant genre and it stars in a series of paintings wherein the painter displays his imagination in order to develop plots based on the main motif of these paintings: the woman. Some examples are En la Ribera, La nieta de la Trini, Ofrenda al arte torero, Naranjas y Limones and Contrariedad.

The rest of the exhibition shows the portraits of the actress Marichu Begoña, inseparable from the author and depicted as the goddess of the hunt Diana with the greyhound Pacheco, and the Sevillian artist Conchita Triana; the facial expression studies he performed with his last model in Córdoba (María Teresa López) in Bendición, La niña de la Jarra, Carmen, Ángeles y Mujer de Córdoba and, finally, his own bronze bust, crafted by Mariano Benlliure in 1931.

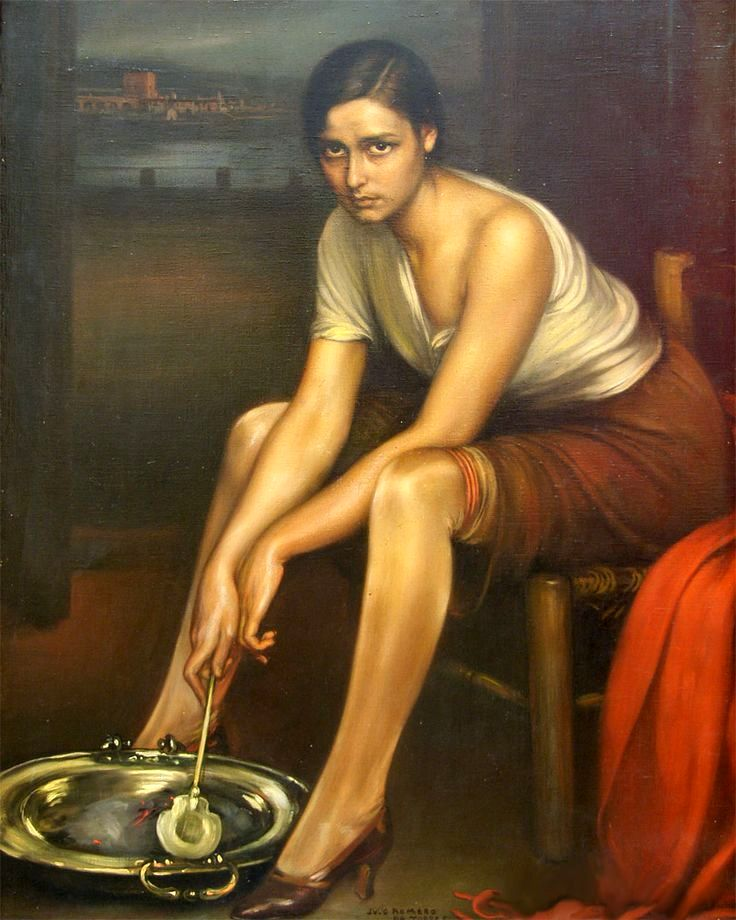
The coal little Girl (1930).

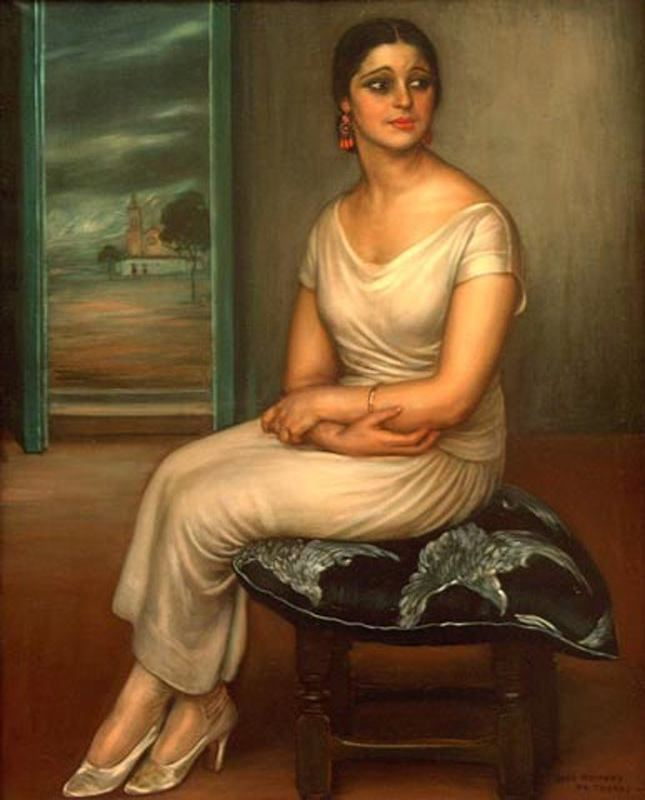
Conchita Triana (1924).

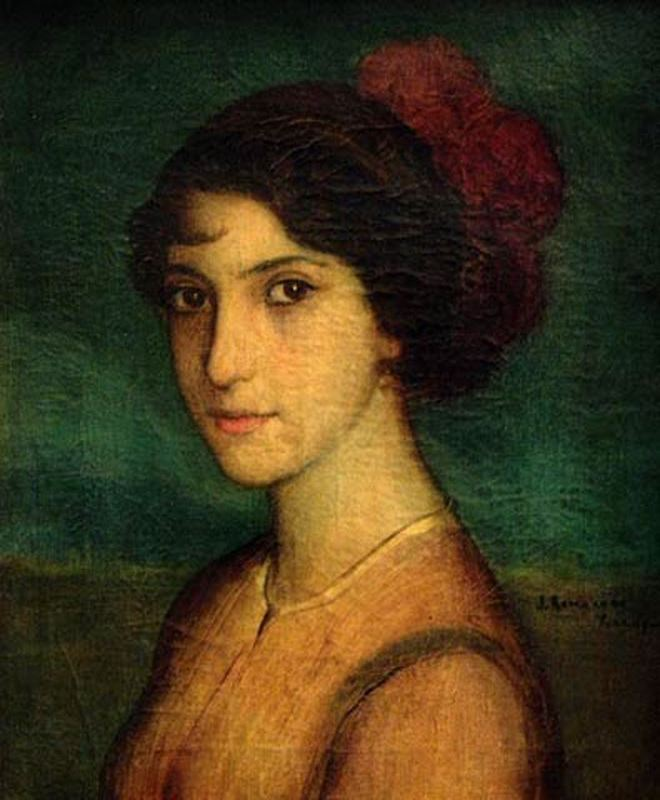
The little Argentinian (1915).

=== Exhibition Hall 4 ===
Romero de Torres was essentially a portrait painter. He painted political and literary figures as well as more social celebrities: he carried out more than five hundred portraits. The Cordoban ministers of Justice and Defence, Antonio Barroso y Castillo and Diego Muñoz-Cobos y Serrano; the socialist deputy Margarita Nelken; the writer Cristóbal de Castro, from Iznájar, and the Sevillian poet Joaquín Alcaida Zafra appear in this hall's portraits.

Countless were the orders he received from high society ladies: Concepción Ruíz Frías, wife of the minister Natalio Rivas Santiago; María Aguilar or the countess of Colomera, Magdalena Muñoz-Cobos, dressed as the queen of 1930 Floral Games in an unfinished portrait.

Elena Pardo, one of his favourite models, is the protagonist of two studies, Mary Luz and Marta, which are part of the group the artist named as Chiquitas buenas.

=== Exhibition Hall 5 ===
The mystical work of Julio Romero, a combination of religiosity and paganism, is gathered in this room in a series of paintings influenced by the Baroque painters of the 17th century Antonio del Castillo and Valdés Leal.

His unique understanding of evangelical and biblical passages acquires a profane sensuality that leads to his personal interpretations of the Magdalene, Salome or the Archangel Saint Raphael.

The painting Virgin of the Lanterns was commissioned by the City Council. It was placed on an altar on the north wall of the Mosque–Cathedral of Córdoba for years until it was moved to the Museum for safety reasons. Other examples of this theme, that are totally out of his line of work, are Death of Saint Ines; a painting that was adapted to a front of the altar with miniaturized scenes about the life and martyrdom of the saint, it also was her mother's favourite painting, so he never wanted to cast it off. More examples are Cabeza de santa and Amor místico.

This Exhibition Hall also houses one of his most important works, Poem of Cordoba, a seven-part polyptych in which he honours the different cultures of the city and which focuses on Saint Raphael, thereby signifying his admiration for the custodian of Cordoba.

=== Exhibition Hall 6 ===
It is home to the greatest compositions: Our Lady of Andalusia, that represents the embodiment of dance, singing and Andalusian flamenco divinized in Andalusian women; and El pecado, that is considered one of the best nude paintings of the 20th century painting.

The painter's great passion for flamenco led him to bring themes of this genre to his paintings. For example, Alegrías, an allegorical scene of dance depicted in a majestic way; and Cante Hondo, a painting where love, passion and death become plastic reality.

In his painting Nocturno, he reflects the harsh reality of exclusion. The sublime portraits of Ysolina Gallego, the Basque painter Zubiaurre's wife, and of Socorro Miranda as Holiness flower. The mystery of Ángeles y Fuensanta and the Sybil of Alpujarra is one of the many themes offered by Julio Romero de Torres' work.

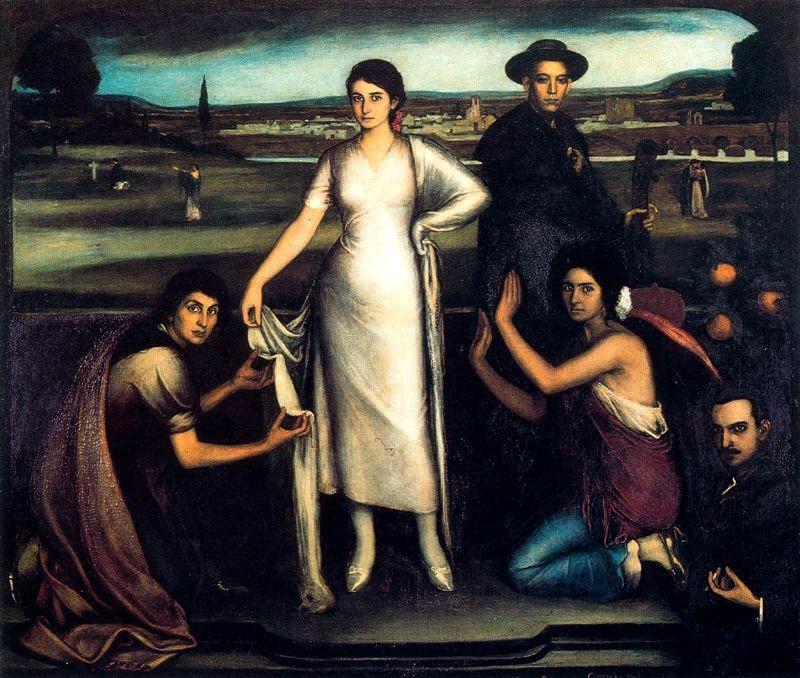
Our Lady of Andalusia (1907).

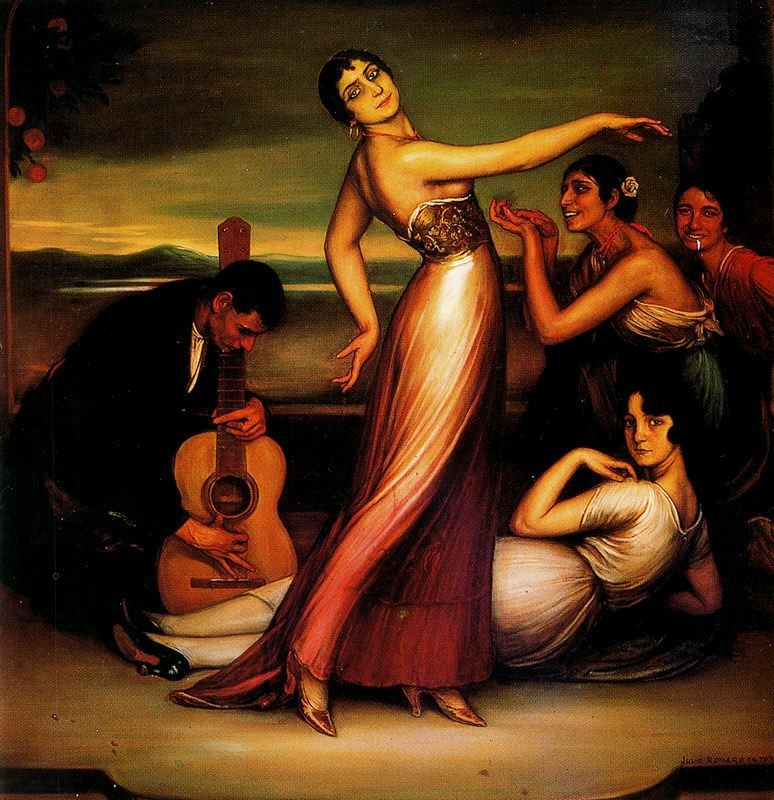
Alegrías (1917).

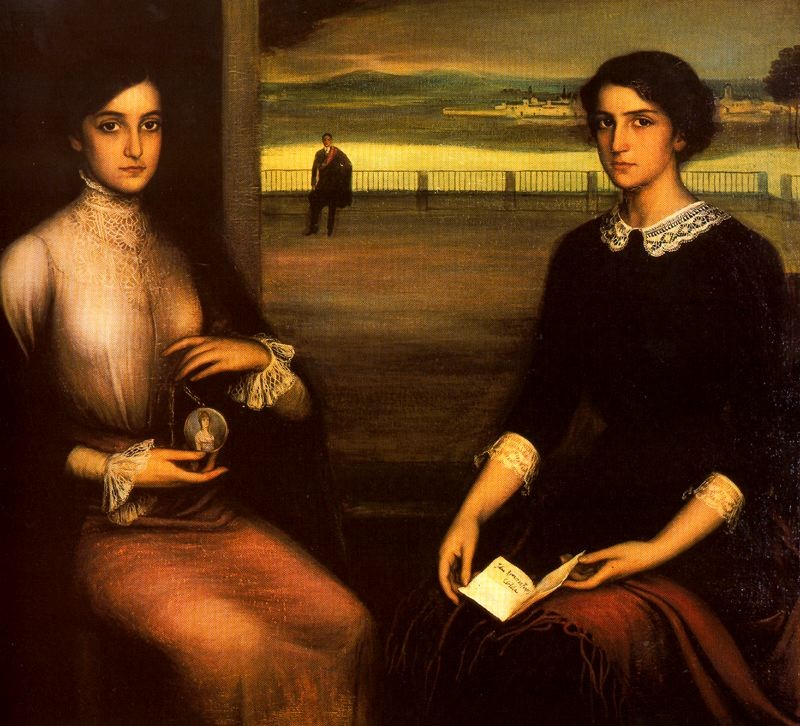
Ángeles y Fuensanta (1909).

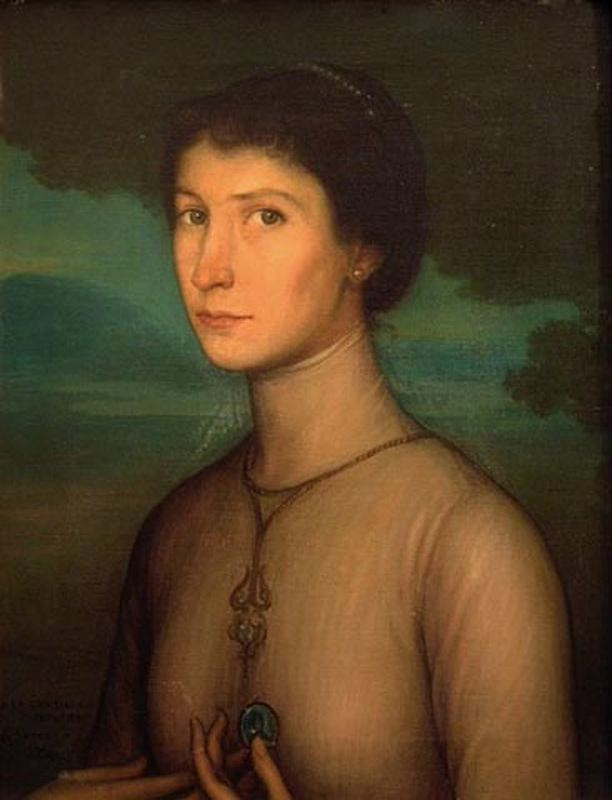
Boceto para el retrato de Ysolina Gallego (1910).

== Works of art ==
- Alegrías
- Amor místico
- Ángeles
- Ángeles y Fuensanta
- Arcángel San Rafael
- Bendición
- Boceto de Ysolina Gallego
- Cabeza de santa
- Cabeza de vieja
- Cabeza empezada
- Cabeza sin terminar
- Camino de bodas
- Cante hondo
- Carmen
- Cartel corrida benéfica de toros
- Cecilia Roballo
- Concepción Magacén
- Concepción Ruiz Frías
- Conchita Triana
- Contrariedad
- Córdoba 1912
- Córdoba 1916
- Diana
- El cohete
- El pecado
- En la ribera
- Encendiendo la mecha
- Writer Cristóbal de Castro
- Eva
- Holiness flower
- Fragmento de un retrato
- Fuensanta
- Horacio de Castro Carboné
- Hours of distress
- Isabel Llopis de Luque
- The little Argentinian
- La chiquita buena
- The coal little Girl
- Countess of colomera
- Andalusian Folk Music
- La escopeta de caza
- La gracia
- Death of Saint Ines
- Trini's Granddaughter
- Girl of the pitcher
- La niña de la rosa
- Girl with oil lamp
- Sibyl of Alpujarra
- Virgin of the Lanterns
- Magdalena
- Manuel Ruiz Maya
- Margarita Nelken
- María de la O
- María Pilar
- Marta
- Mary Luz
- Ministro Barroso y Castillo
- Look how pretty she was!
- Monjit
- Mujer de Córdoba
- Woman with Pistol
- Oranges and lemons
- Nieves
- Nocturno
- Our Lady of Andalusia
- An offering to the art of bullfighting
- Poem of Cordoba
- Poeta Joaquín Alcaide Zafra
- Rafaela
- Retrato Amalia Romero de Torres
- Retrato don José Antonio Gómez
- Retrato joven
- Retrato María Aguilar
- Retrato Ysolina Gallego
- Rosarillo
- Salomé
- Salud
- Samaritan Woman
- Tte. General Diego Muñoz Cobos y Serrano
- Long Live Hair

== Address and hours ==
Plaza del Potro, 1

Hours

- Monday closed: except those established in the collective bargaining agreement.
- From Tuesday to Friday: from 08:30 to 20:45.
- Saturday: from 08:30 to 16:30.
- Sunday and public holidays: from 09:30 to 14:30.

== See also ==
- List of single-artist museums
