= Diario de Córdoba =

Former newspaper in Córdoba, Spain

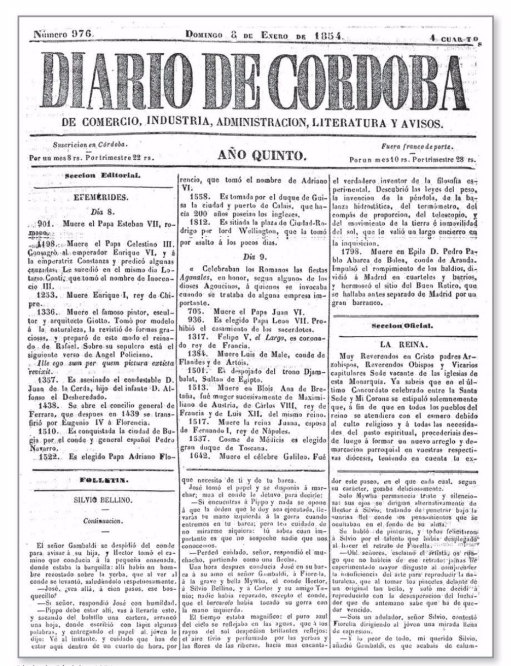
- 976 issue (January 8, 1854)
- Type: Daily newspaper
- Founder: Fausto García Tena
- Founded: 1849
- Ceased publication: September 30, 1938
- Language: Spanish
- Headquarters: Córdoba
- Country: Spain
- ISSN: 2659-9651

The Diario de Córdoba was a Spanish newspaper published in the city of Córdoba between 1849 and 1938. Founded in the mid-19th century, throughout its history the newspaper established itself as one of the main publications in the capital of Córdoba. It became the dean of the Cordoban press and continued to be published well into the Spanish Civil War.

== History ==
It was founded in 1849 by the businessman and printer Fausto García Tena, originally born as Diario de Córdoba of commerce, industry, administration, news and notices. (Note: In Spanish: Diario de Córdoba de comercio, industria, administración, noticias y avisos) After the death of the founder, in 1874 the newspaper was managed by his sons: Ignacio, Manuel, Rafael and Fausto. At the end of the 19th century Rafael García Lovera was still in charge of the newspaper. After his death the ownership of the newspaper passed into the hands of his widow, Araceli Osuna Pineda.

In its early years it coexisted with another prominent local newspaper, La Crónica de Córdoba.

From its inception it was a publication with an independent and moderate editorial line, although it later moved towards more conservative positions. It stayed away from political disputes, focusing more on issues related to the development of Córdoba and its province. It would again adopt an independent stance after Ricardo de Montis became editor of the newspaper in 1929. Despite the relevance it achieved at provincial level, it would never reach the circulation and relevance of the main newspapers of the time, nor did it always enjoy a healthy economy. In this sense, the newspaper always had a modest circulation and would never exceed 3,000 copies.

At the time of the Second Republic, the newspaper came to be considered the "dean" of the Andalusian press, as by then it was the longest-lived newspaper that was still active. A reflection of its social prestige was that since 1930 the newspaper had a street named after it.

The Diario de Córdoba continued to be published after the outbreak of the Civil War, (Note: Checa Godoy, however, states that it disappeared on the eve of the Civil War, after its installations were burnt down by arson (Checa Godoy, 1989, p. 212).) but the Press Law of 1938 established requirements that newspapers such as the Cordovan daily could not assume, so it ended up disappearing that same year. Its last issue appeared on 30 September 1938. (Note: Another of the newspapers that was affected by these circumstances was the Catholic and traditionalist newspaper El Defensor de Córdoba (Reig García, 2011, p. 140).)

Among the directors, editors and contributors were Ignacio García Lovera, Manuel García Lovera, Ricardo de Montis, Marcelino Durán de Velilla —the last director of the newspaper between 1936 and 1938—, Carolina de Soto y Corro, Manuel Villalba y Burgos, José Osuna Pineda, Rafael Osuna Pineda, Francisco Arévalo, Antonio Arévalo, Manuel García Prieto, Rosario Vázquez, Olimpia Cobos Losúa, Eugenio García Nielfa, Francisco Azorín, etc.

== Archive ==
The Municipal Library of Cordoba has microfilmed issues from 1854 - five years after its foundation - to 1938, although there are numerous gaps referring to specific issues and whole years. There are also series of copies conserved in the State Public Library in Cordoba, in the Municipal Archives of Cordoba and in the collections of the University of Cordoba.

Garci Fernandez agreed to call himself Count of Castañeda, which possession was taken by his wife Doña Aldonza, who was the daughter of D. Juan, Lord of Aguilar, and granddaughter of Count D. Tello.

== Bibliography ==
- Alcalá Ortiz, Enrique (2004). Almedinilla y almedinillenses en la prensa cordobesa (1852-1952) (in Spanish). Ayuntamiento de Almedinilla.
- Álvarez Rey, Leandro (2009). "Los Diputados por Andalucía de la Segunda República, 1931-1939: diccionario biográfico". Centro de Estudios Andaluces (in Spanish). I.
- Aróstegui, Julio (1988). Historia y memoria de la Guerra Civil. Encuentro en Castilla y León: Salamanca, 24-27 de septiembre de 1986 (in Spanish). Junta de Castilla y León.
- Casas Delgado, Inmaculada (2012). Romances con acento andaluz: el éxito de la prensa popular (1750-1850) (in Spanish). Sevilla: Centro de Estudios Andaluces. ISBN 978-84-939926-2-0.
- Checa Godoy, Antonio (1989). Prensa y partidos políticos durante la II República (in Spanish). Universidad de Salamanca. ISBN 9788474815214.
- Checa Godoy, Antonio (1991). Historia de la prensa andaluza (in Spanish). Fundación Blas Infante.
- Ramírez Gómez (2000). Mujeres escritoras en la prensa andaluza del siglo XX (1900-1950) (in Spanish). Universidad de Sevilla. ISBN 9788447205608.
- Reig García, Ramón (2011). La comunicación en Andalucía: Historia, estructura y nuevas tecnologías (in Spanish). Sevilla: Centro de Estudios Andaluces. ISBN 978-84-939078-0-8.
- Sánchez de Miguel, Ana (1998). Córdoba 1898: Generación e historia. Pérdida de las islas de Cuba, Filipinas, Puerto Rico, Marianas y Carolinas (in Spanish). Universidad de Córdoba.
- Vega, Álvaro (2006). El papel de la prensa en Córdoba durante la II República (in Spanish). RD Editores.
