= Venus of Poetry =

1913 painting by Julio Romero de Torres

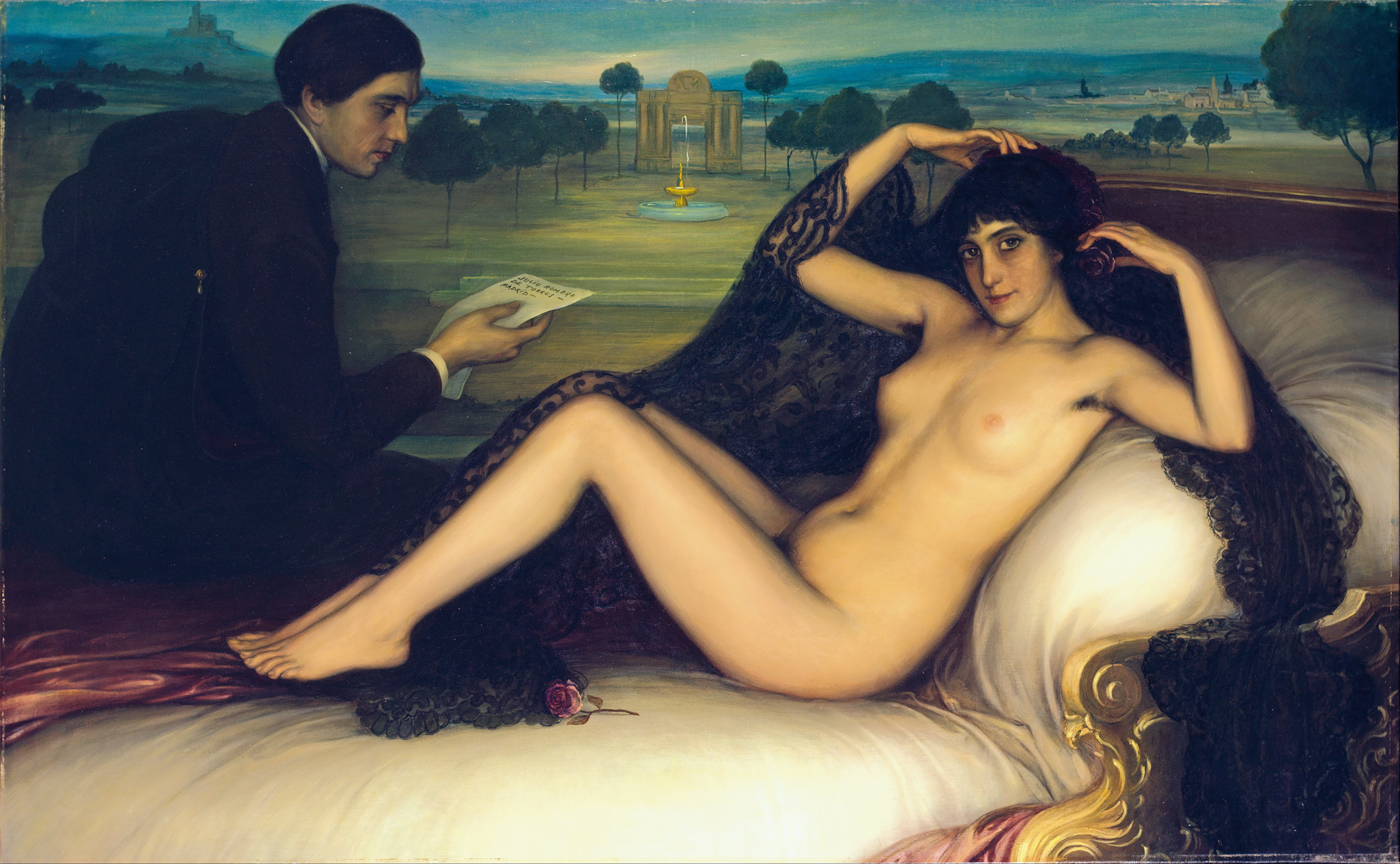
- Artist: Julio Romero de Torres
- Year: 1913
- Medium: Oil on canvas
- Dimensions: 93.2 cm × 154 cm (36.7 in × 61 in)
- Location: Bilbao Fine Arts Museum, Bilbao

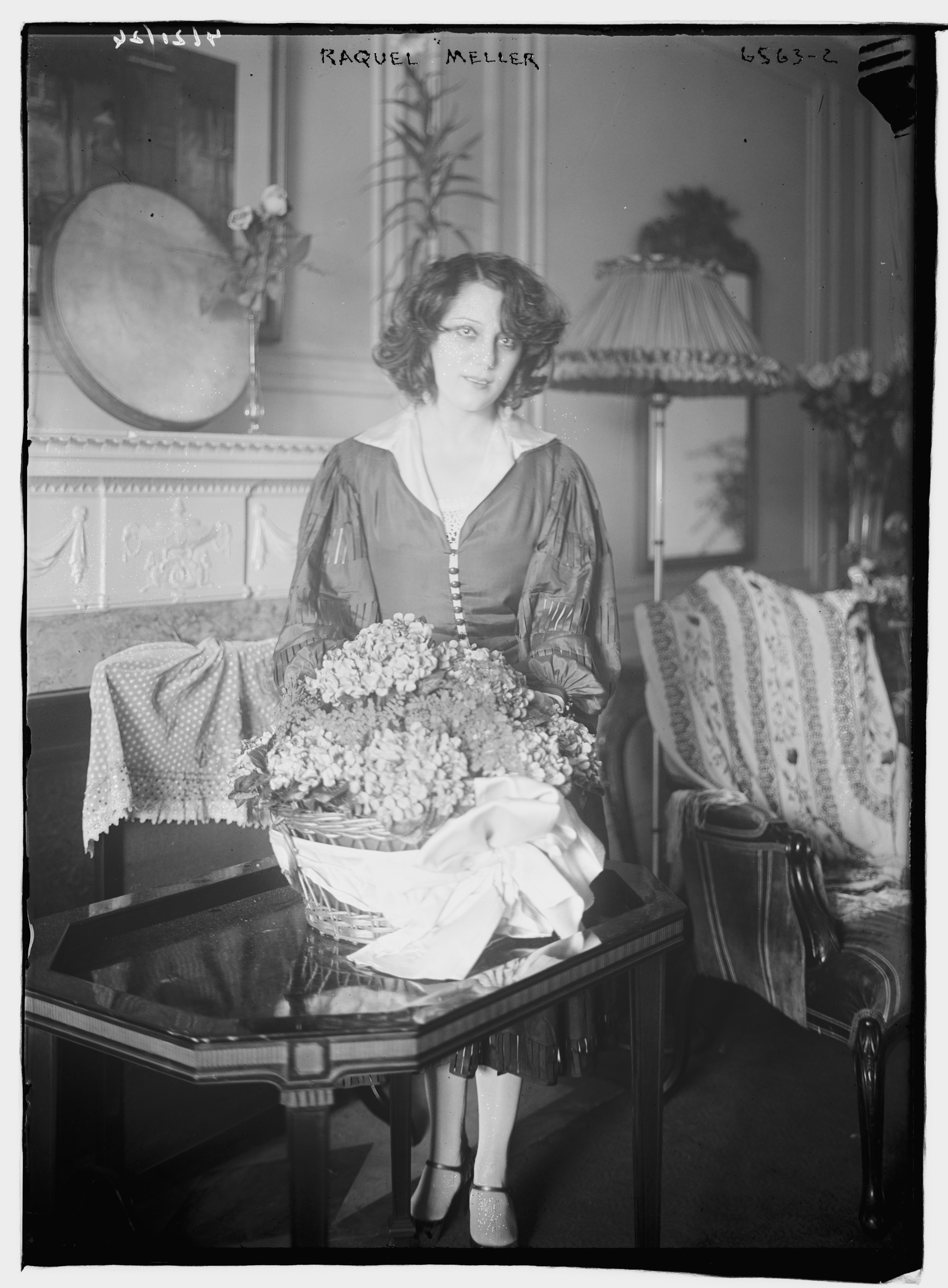
Raquel Meller, the woman behind the painting.

Venus of Poetry (Spanish: La Venus de la poesía) is an oil painting by the Spanish artist Julio Romero de Torres, from 1913. It is held at the Bilbao Fine Arts Museum.

== History and description ==
This painting is an allegory that shows the portraits of the Spanish singer Raquel Meller and her future husband, the Guatemalan writer, Enrique Gómez Carrillo, both immersed in a rural landscape.

The naked woman is lying on a bed with white sheets and wears a black lace mantilla on her head. Raquel, likened to the goddess Venus in the title of the work, looks at the viewer and smiles provocatively. Near her feet there is a rose, symbolizing beauty and passionate love. Carrillo holds a sheet of paper where the artist's signature is visible. In the background, at the center of the composition, can be seen a fountain and the Puente del Puente de Córdoba, a Renaissance-era gate, between two rows of trees. Further away, there is a river (the Guadalquivir) and the city of Córdoba.

According to some experts, the main source of inspiration for this work was the painting Venus and the Music, by Titian.
