= La Fuensanta =

1929 painting by Julio Romero de Torres

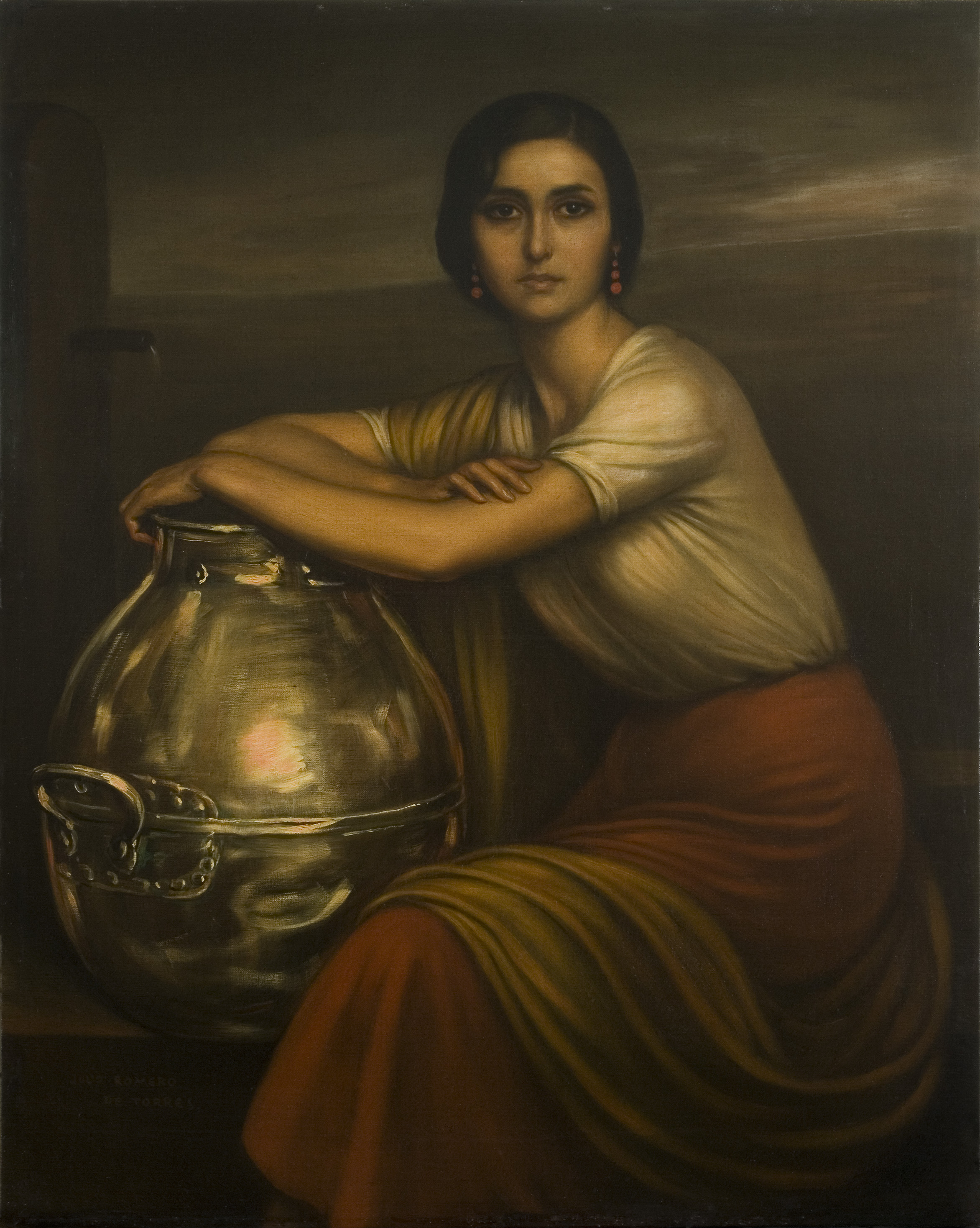
- Artist: Julio Romero de Torres
- Year: 1929
- Medium: Oil on canvas
- Dimensions: 100 cm × 80 cm (39 in × 31 in)
- Location: Private collection

La Fuensanta is a portrait painting by Spanish artist Julio Romero de Torres depicting María Teresa López González, one of Torres' models. Gonzalez is depicted with her arms resting on a copper cauldron. The painting was made in the autumn of 1929, when Torres completed another two artworks, La Chiquita Piconera and Bodegas Cruz Conde. "Fuensanta" is a Spanish girl’s name that means "holy fountain."

Born in Argentina, González moved with her family to Torres' native town of Córdoba after World War I. After she first sat for Torres at the age of fourteen, González became one of his favourite models whose likeness is most closely associated to Torres. According to Sotheby's, the work has been "proclaimed as a quintessential rendition of Andalucian beauty". It was depicted for 25 years on the 100 peseta banknote.

== Provenance ==
The provenance of La Fuensanta has been largely unknown since 1930, when it was exhibited at the Ibero-American Exposition in Seville. In 1994, the painting was bought by an Argentine citizen. In November 2007, La Fuensanta was sold by Sotheby's to a private buyer. The Spanish Ministry of Culture tried to purchase the painting from Sotheby's, but the auction price of €1,173,400 euros was too high.

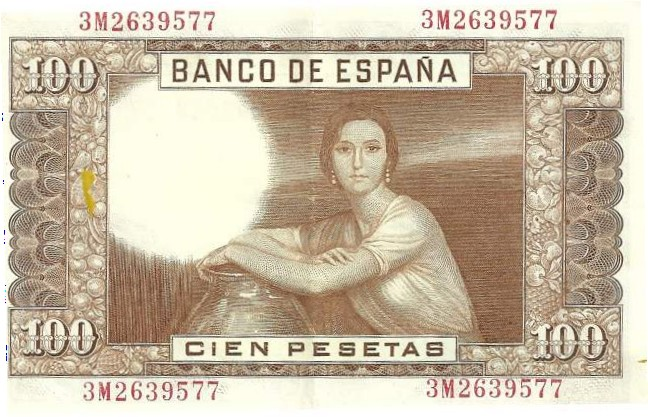
La Fuensanta on the reverse of 100 pesetas, 1953
