= Julio Antonio =

Spanish sculptor

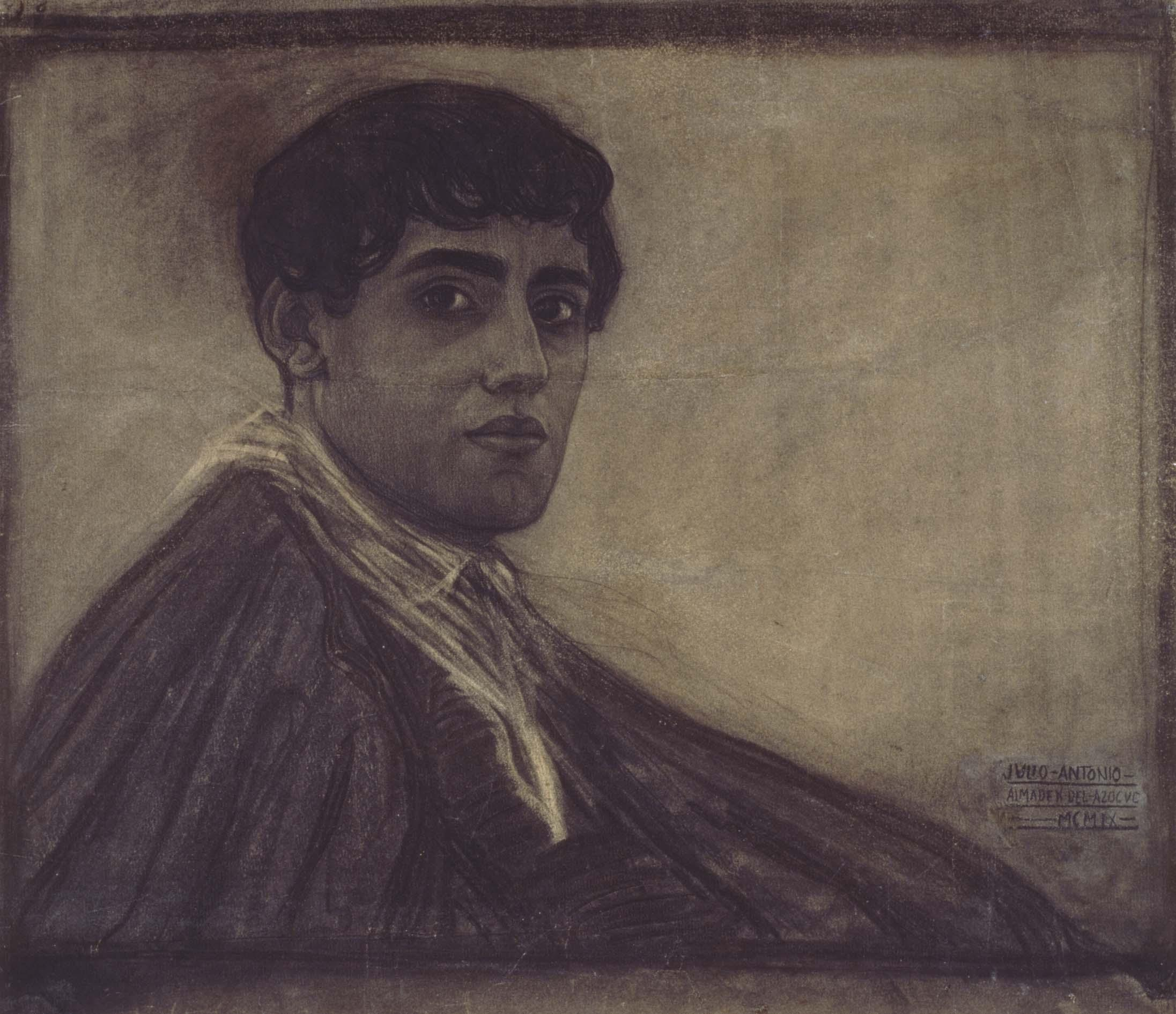
Self-portrait (1909)

Antonio Rodríguez Hernández, known as Julio Antonio (6 February 1889, Mora de Ebro – 15 February 1919, Madrid) was a Spanish sculptor.

== Biography ==
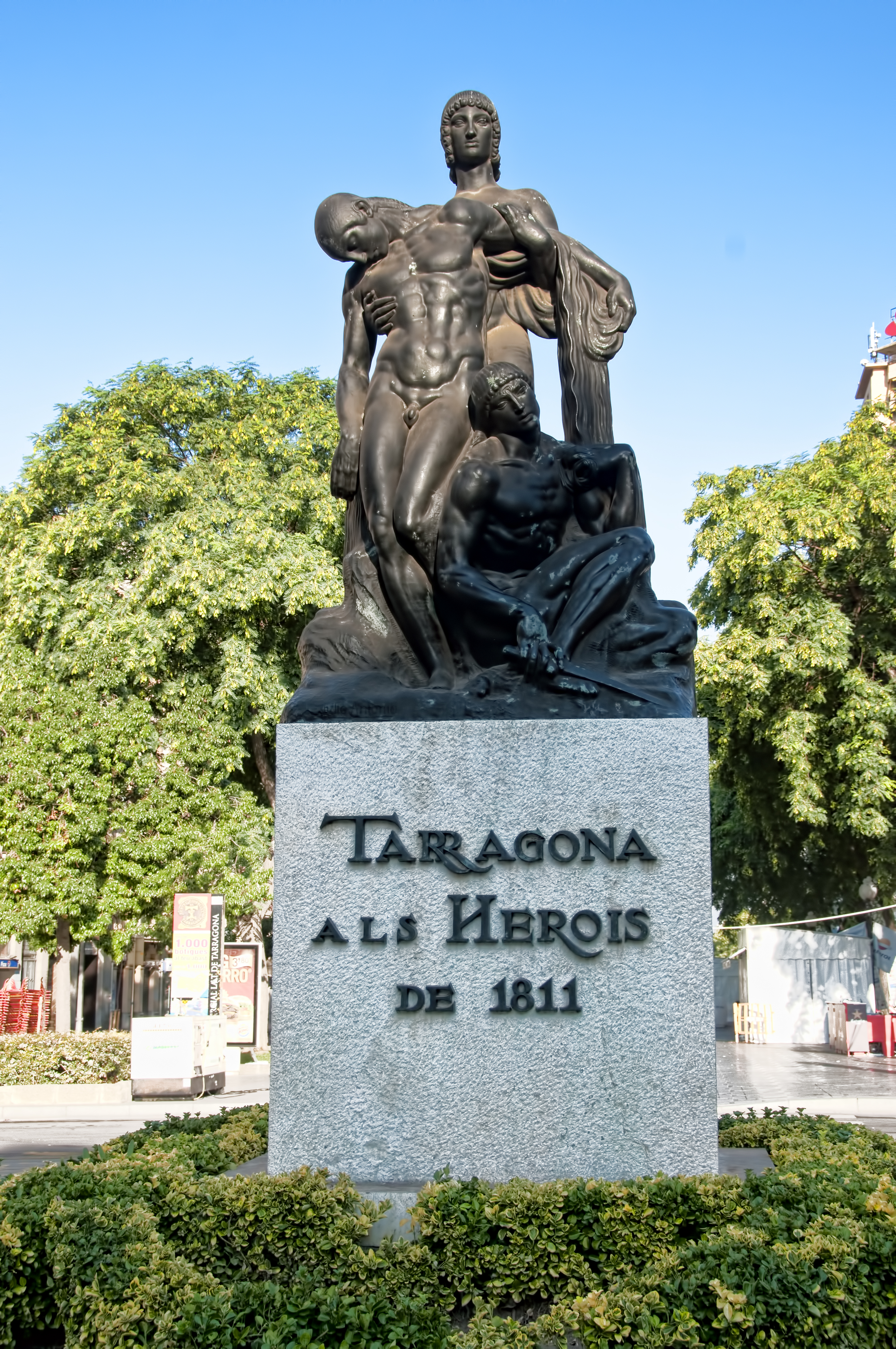
Monument to the Heroes of Tarragona (1910–1919)

He began studying sculpture at a local school in Tarragona, followed by an apprenticeship in the workshops of Fèlix Ferrer i Galceran, in Barcelona. His first fully original sculpture, "Flores malsanas" (Wilting Flowers), which he later destroyed, was created when they moved to Murcia.

Upon turning 18, he went to Madrid, with a scholarship from the Diputación de Tarragona. There, he worked in the studios of Miguel Blay, one of Spain's best known sculptors at that time. Despite his good experiences with Blay, he decided to leave and undertake a journey throughout the country with his friend, the painter Miquel Viladrich Vila. Later, they would set up their own studio together. In 1908, he created his first major work, "María, la gitana" (Maria, the Gypsy); which expressed his own personality and broke with the prevailing popular styles.

He also worked as an illustration, providing drawings for works by Antonio de Hoyos y Vinent, Eugenio Noel and Ramón Gómez de la Serna, among others.

Just as his work was beginning to receive popular acclaim, he died of tuberculosis, aged 30. His best known work is a monument for those who defended Tarragona during the Peninsular War. He worked on it from 1910 until shortly before his death. Due to financing problems and disagreements over its location, it was not dedicated until 1931. A funerary monument for the Lemonier family, to honor their eldest son, who died at the age of 11, is also among his familiar creations. It was never placed at the tomb, and is now in the Museo de Arte Moderno de Tarragona

In November 2018, in preparation for the centenary of his death, his remains and those of his mother were exhumed from the Cementerio de la Almudena in Madrid, and relocated to the cemetery in Mora de Ebro.

== Sources ==
- Carolyn P. Boyd, "Julio Antonio, the “sculptor of the race”: The making of a modernist myth", in: Historia y Política #37 pp. 395–413 ISSN 1989-063X
- María Victoria Gómez Alfeo, Fernando García Rodríguez, "Documentación y análisis de las críticas de arte sobre el escultor Julio Antonio, "el amado de la crítica"" in: Documentación de las Ciencias de la Información, Vol.27, pp. 75–96 ISSN 1988-2890
- Silvio Lago, "Artistas contemporáneos. Julio Antonio" in: La Esfera, #268, 1919 ISSN 1577-0389
- Antonio Salcedo Miliani, Julio Antonio 1889-1919 Escultor, Barcelona Àmbit Serveis Editorials, 1997 ISBN 84-89681-08-2
