= Francisco Azorín Izquierdo =

Spanish politician (1885–1975)

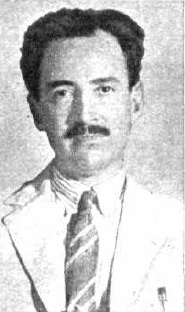
Francisco Azorín Izquierdo

Francisco Azorín Izquierdo (12 September 1885, Monforte de Moyuela – 27 December 1975; Mexico) was a Spanish politician. He was one of the key agitators of the Spanish Socialist Workers Party (PSOE) in the Córdoba province.

Azorín Izquierdo was the son of a Guardia Civil from Alicante province. He studied at the Instituto General y Técnico in Teruel. In 1902 he moved to Madrid, to study at the Escuela Superior de Arquitectura. In the same year he joined PSOE. In Madrid he befriended the socialist leader Pablo Iglesias. Eight years later he returned to Teruel, and began teaching at the Instituto General y Técnico.

Being fluent in English, French and German, Azorín Izquierdo accompanied Iglesias at various international events from 1910 and onwards.

In 1912 Azorín Izquierdo moved to Málaga, to work as an architect there for a government agency. In July 1912 he married Carmen Poch Puga. He then moved to Córdoba, where he was contracted as a government official. He became politically active in the local socialist movement, speaking at a Socialist Youth meeting in the city in 1914. He became a member of the national committee of the Socialist Youth.

Azoín Izquierdo served as the president of the Córdoba city and province party organizations during several periods, as well as heading the Citizens' Federation and the provincial agrarian labourers' union. In 1919 and 1923 he stood as candidate in the national parliamentary elections. But in these elections he faced harassment and electoral fraud and was barred from being elected. He also stood as a candidate for the city council, but his employers order him to work in Las Palmas de Gran Canaria just before the election. Azorín Izquierdo refused to go along with the deployment and remained as a candidate. He was elected and served in the council until 1922. In 1922 he failed to get re-elected.

Between 1917 and 1927 he worked as an independent architect (with a part-time job as municipal architect in Ecija). He developed an independent and eclectic style of architecture of his own, with a clear social perspective. In the beginning of the 1930s, he opened an architect agency in Madrid together with José Mauro de Murga Serret.

Between 1928 and 1931 he served as national spokesperson of PSOE. In 1931 he was again elected to the Córdoba city council, and in the same year he was elected to the Spanish parliament. He failed to get re-elected to parliament in 1933, in the midst of internal disputes within the party in Andalusia.

Azorín Izquirdo, part of the moderate wing of PSOE, came into conflict with his own provincial party organization. He was denied a ticket in the 1936 parliamentary election as a result. In 1938 he moved to France, and served as Spanish consul in Tarbes and Toulouse. In 1939 he emigrated to Veracruz, Mexico. Together with his sons, we worked on the national monument in honour of Lázaro Cárdenas (inaugurated in 1974).
