= La chiquita piconera =

1930 painting by Julio Romero de Torres

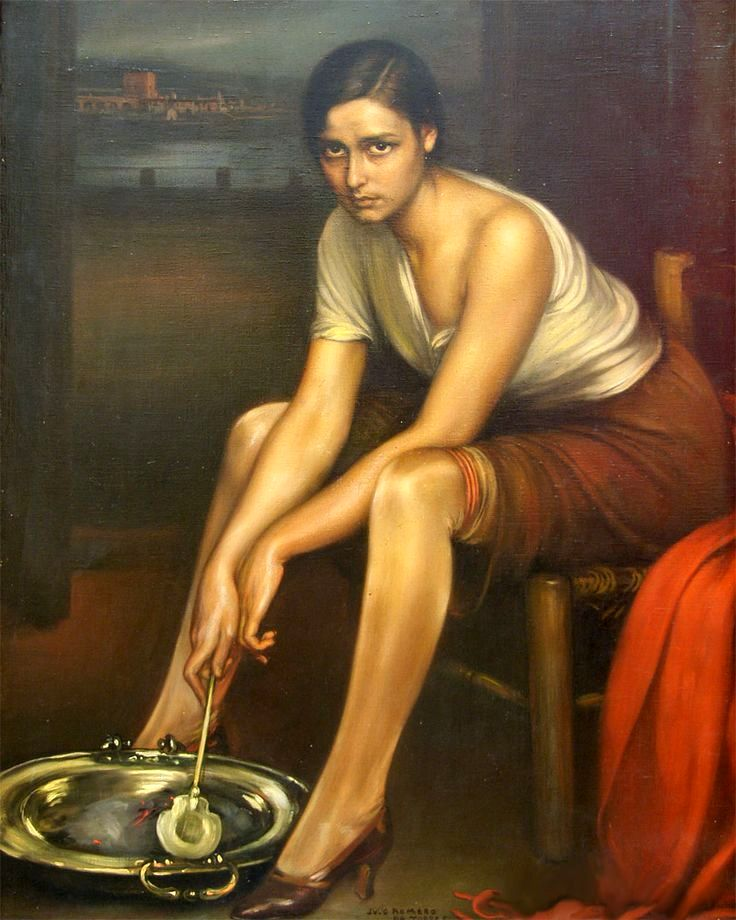
- Artist: Julio Romero de Torres
- Year: 1930
- Medium: Oil on canvas
- Dimensions: 100 cm × 80 cm (39 in × 31 in)
- Location: Julio Romero de Torres Museum; Córdoba

La chiquita piconera is an oil on canvas painting by Spanish artist Julio Romero de Torres, from 1930. It is held at the Julio Romero de Torres Museum, in Córdoba.

== History and description ==
Finished in February 1930, it is considered the last complete work by Romero de Torres before his death. The female model is believed to be María Teresa López, age 13 or 14 at the time.

In the foreground, the painting depicts a young woman seated on a wooden and rush-seated chair, stirring a charcoal brazier with a shovel. She looks directly at the viewer, with one shoulder bare, her legs covered only by stockings and high heels, creating an atmosphere considered erotic at the time and characteristic of Romero de Torres's work.

In the background, through a doorway, a landscape of Córdoba can be seen, similarly to others of his works. The Paseo de la Ribera, the Guadalquivir River, the Roman bridge, and the Calahorra Tower are all visible.

The work primarily oozes erotism, displaying a number of sexual fetishes recurring in the artist's portfolio. In the light of the common underlying theme of prostitution and the saliency of the stocking and the brazier, the work has been compared to Francisco de Goya's capricho Bien tirada está.
