= The Conversion of Saint Paul (disambiguation) =

The Conversion of Paul the Apostle is an event in the life of Paul the Apostle.

The Conversion of Saint Paul or of Saul may also refer to:

== Paintings ==
- The Conversion of Saint Paul (Parmigianino), a painting of 1527 by Parmigianino
- The Conversion of Saul (Michelangelo), a painting of 1545 by Michelangelo
- Conversion of Paul (Bruegel), a painting of 1567 by Pieter Bruegel the Elder
- The Conversion of Saint Paul (Caravaggio), a painting of 1601 by Caravaggio, now in the Odescalchi Balbi Collection, Rome
- Conversion on the Way to Damascus, a painting by Caravaggio completed later in 1601, now in the church of Santa Maria del Popolo, Rome
- The Conversion of Saint Paul (Rubens, London), a painting of c. 1610–1612 by Peter Paul Rubens
- The Conversion of Saint Paul (Maíno), a painting of 1614 by Juan Bautista Maíno
- The Conversion of Saint Paul (Rubens, Berlin), a lost painting of the 1620s by Peter Paul Rubens
- The Conversion of Saint Paul (Murillo), a painting of 1675–1680 by Bartolomé Esteban Murillo

== Other uses ==
- Conversion of St. Paul Church (Vermont), a parish in Vermont
