= Old Master =

Any skilled painter who worked in Europe before 1800

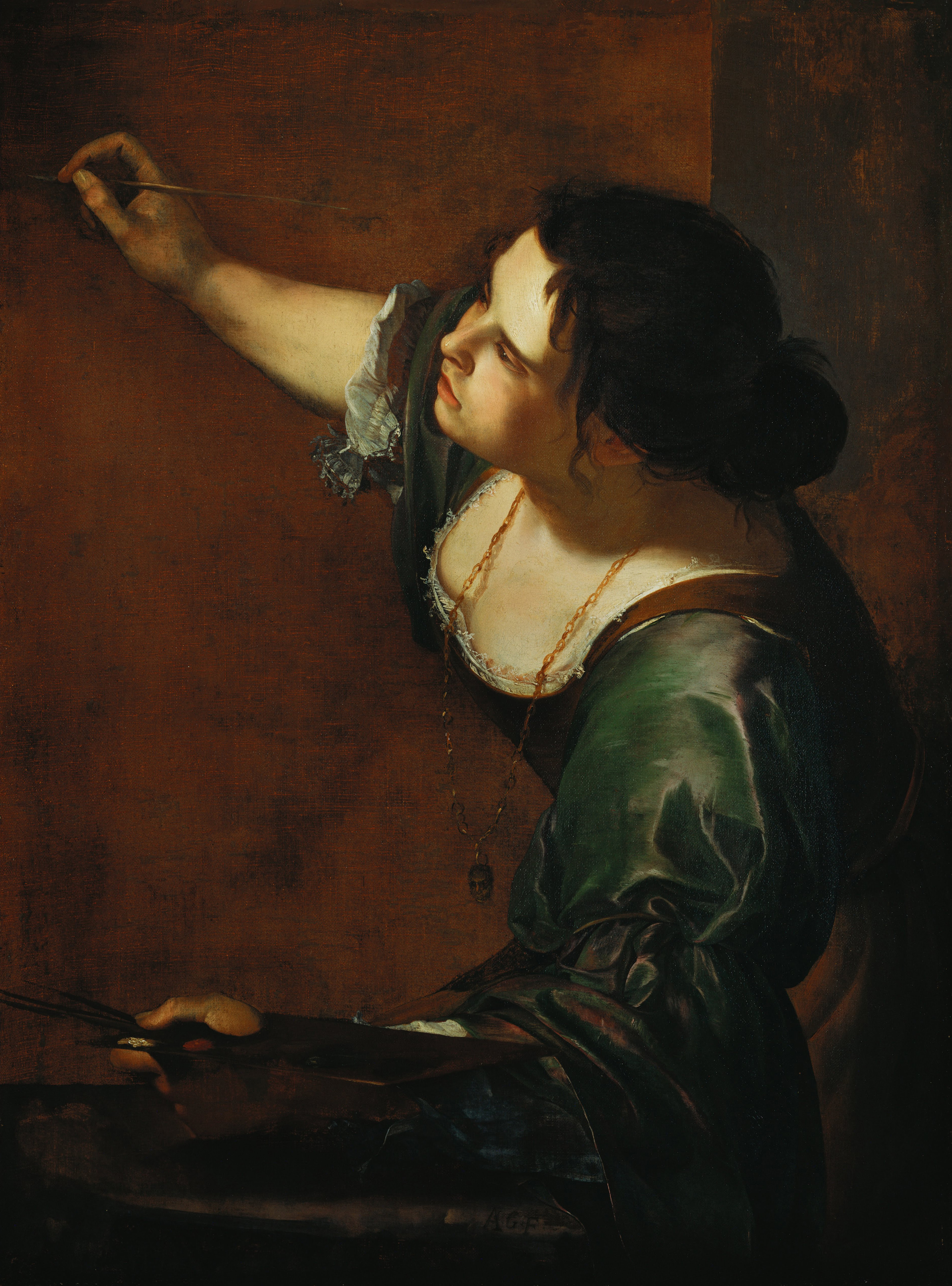
Self-Portrait as the Allegory of Painting, Artemisia Gentileschi

In art history, "Old Master" (or "old master") refers to any painter of skill who worked in Europe before about 1800, or a painting by such an artist. An "old master print" is an original print (for example an engraving, woodcut, or etching) made by an artist in the same period. The term "old master drawing" is used in the same way.

In theory, "Old Master" applies only to artists who were fully trained, were Masters of their local artists' guild, and worked independently, but in practice, paintings produced by pupils or workshops are often included in the scope of the term. Therefore, beyond a certain level of competence, date rather than quality is the criterion for using the term.

== Period covered ==
In the eighteenth and nineteenth centuries, the term was often understood as having a starting date of perhaps 1450 or 1470; paintings made before that were "primitives", but this distinction is no longer made. The Oxford English Dictionary defines the term as "A pre-eminent artist of the period before the modern; esp. a pre-eminent western European painter of the 13th to 18th centuries." The first quotation given is from 1696, in the diary of John Evelyn: "My L: Pembroke..shewed me divers rare Pictures of very many of the old & best Masters, especially that of M: Angelo..,& a large booke of the best drawings of the old Masters." The term is also used to refer to a painting or sculpture made by an Old Master, a usage datable to 1824. There are comparable terms in Dutch, French, and German; the Dutch may have been the first to make use of such a term, in the 18th century, when oude meester mostly meant painters of the Dutch Golden Age of the previous century. Les Maitres d'autrefois of 1876 by Eugene Fromentin may have helped to popularize the concept, although "vieux maitres" is also used in French. The famous collection in Dresden at the Gemäldegalerie Alte Meister is one of the few museums to include the term in its actual name, although many more use it in the title of departments or sections. The collection in the Dresden museum essentially stops at the Baroque period.

The end date is necessarily vague – for example, Goya (1746–1828) is certainly an Old Master, though he was still painting and printmaking at his death in 1828. The term might also be used for John Constable (1776–1837) or Eugène Delacroix (1798–1863), but usually is not. Edward Lucie-Smith gives an end date of 1800, noting "formerly used of paintings earlier than 1700".

The term tends to be avoided by art historians as too vague, especially when discussing paintings, although the terms "Old Master Prints" and "Old Master drawings" are still used. It remains current in the art trade. Auction houses still usually divide their sales between, for example, "Old Master Paintings", "Nineteenth-century paintings", and "Modern paintings". Christie's defined the term as ranging "from the 14th to the early 19th century".

The relevant part of the large and important collection of the Royal Museums of Fine Arts of Belgium in their main building in Brussels was renamed in recent years as the Oldmasters Museum in Dutch and English, and Musée Oldmasters in French. It was previously called the "Royal Museum of Ancient Art" in English (French: Musée royal d'Art ancien; Dutch: Koninklijk Museum voor Oude Kunst).

== Anonymous artists ==
Artists, most often from early periods, whose hand has been identified by art historians, but to whom no identity can be confidently attached, are often given names (a Notname) by art historians such as Master E.S. (from his monogram), Master of Flémalle (from a previous location of a work), Master of Mary of Burgundy (from a patron), Master of Latin 757 (from the shelf mark of a manuscript he illuminated), Master of the Embroidered Foliage (from his characteristic technique), Master of the Brunswick Diptych, or Master of Schloss Lichtenstein.

== List of the most important Old Master painters ==
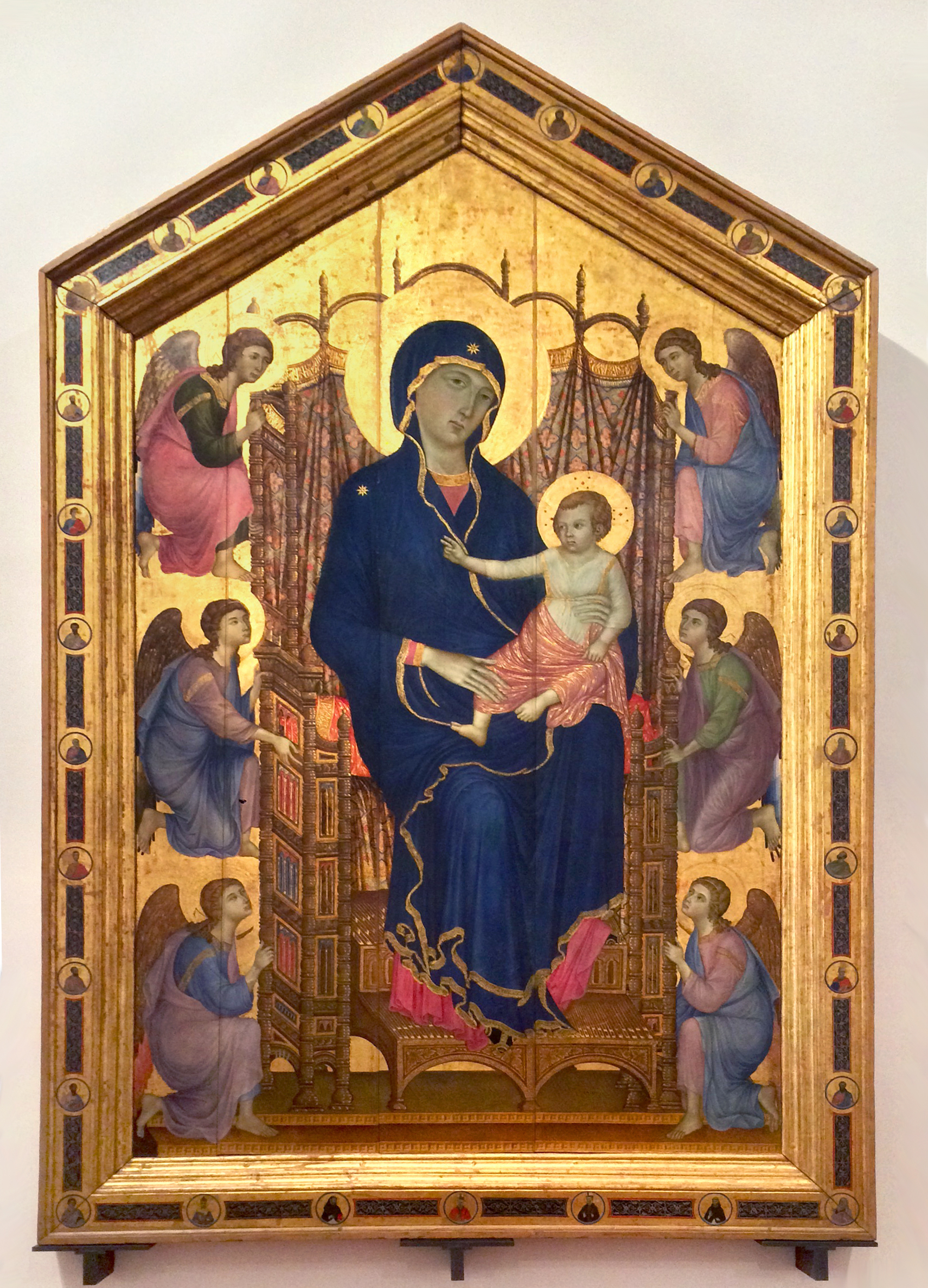
Rucellai Madonna by Duccio, c. 1285.

=== Gothic/Proto-Renaissance ===
- Cimabue (Italian, 1240–1302), frescoes in the Basilica of San Francesco d'Assisi
- Giotto di Bondone (Italian, 1267–1337), first Renaissance fresco painter
- Duccio (Italian, 1255–1318), Sienese painter
- Simone Martini (Italian, 1285–1344), Gothic painter of the Sienese School
- Ambrogio Lorenzetti (Italian, c. 1290–1348), Gothic painter
- Pietro Lorenzetti (Italian, c. 1280–1348), Sienese school
- Gentile da Fabriano (Italian, 1370–1427), International gothic painter
- Lorenzo Monaco (Italian, 1370–1425), International gothic style
- Masolino (Italian, c. 1383–c. 1447), Goldsmith trained painter
- Pisanello (Italian, c. 1395–c. 1455), International gothic painter and medallist
- Sassetta (Italian, c. 1392–1450), Sienese International Gothic painter

=== Early Renaissance ===
- Paolo Uccello (Italian, 1397–1475), schematic use of foreshortening
- Fra Angelico (Italian, 1400–1455), noted for San Marco convent frescoes
- Masaccio (Italian, 1401–1428), first to use linear perspective thereby giving sense of three-dimensionality plus developed new realism
- Fra Filippo Lippi (Italian, 1406–1469), father of Filippino
- Andrea del Castagno (Italian, 1410–1457)
- Piero della Francesca (Italian, 1415–1492), painter who pioneered linear perspective
- Benozzo Gozzoli (Italian, 1420–1497)
- Alesso Baldovinetti (Italian, 1425–1499)
- Vincenzo Foppa (Italian, 1425–1515)

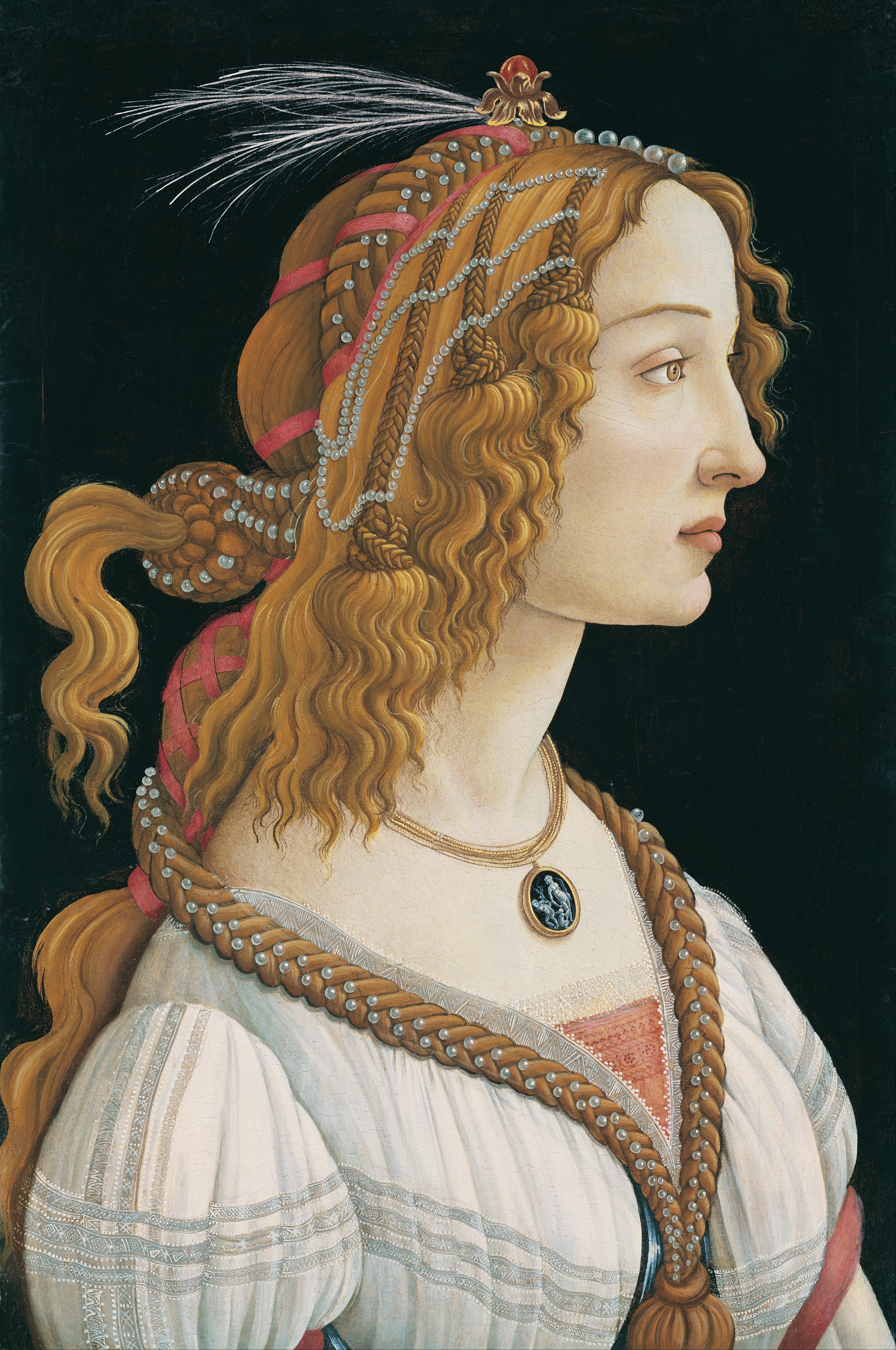
Portrait of a young woman by Sandro Botticelli, 1480

- Antonello da Messina (Italian, 1430–1479), painter who pioneered oil painting
- Cosimo Tura (Italian, 1430–1495)
- Andrea Mantegna (Italian, 1431–1506), master of perspective and detail
- Antonio del Pollaiuolo (Italian, 1431–1498)
- Francesco Cossa (Italian, 1435–1477)
- Melozzo da Forli (Italian, 1438–1494)
- Luca Signorelli (Italian, 1441–1523)
- Perugino (Italian, c. 1446–1523), Raphael was his pupil
- Verrocchio (Italian, c. 1435–1488)
- Sandro Botticelli (Italian, c. 1445–1510), great Florentine master
- Domenico Ghirlandaio (Italian, 1449–1494), prolific Florentine fresco painter
- Pinturicchio (Italian, 1454–1513)
- Filippino Lippi (Italian, 1457–1504), son of Filippo
- Cima da Conegliano (Italian, 1459–1517)
- Piero di Cosimo (Italian, 1462–1521)

=== High Renaissance ===
- Francesco Francia (Italian, 1450–1517)
- Leonardo da Vinci (Italian, 1452–1519), acclaimed oil painter and draughtsman
- Lorenzo Costa (Italian, 1460–1535)

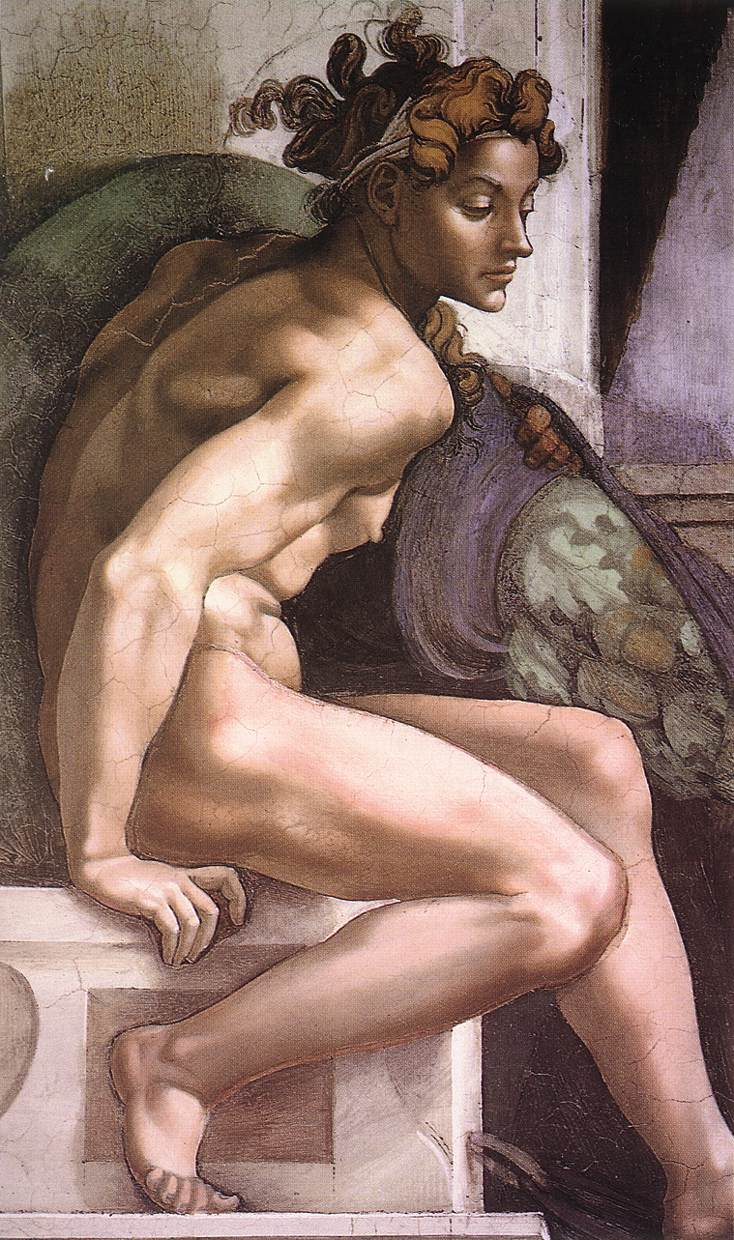
Sistine Chapel ceiling, Ignudi, Michelangelo, 1509

- Fra Bartolommeo (Italian, 1472–1517)
- Michelangelo (Italian, 1475–1564), acclaimed sculptor, painter and architect
- Bernardino Luini (Italian, c. 1480–1532)
- Raphael (Italian, 1483–1520), acclaimed painter
- Il Garofalo (Italian, 1481–1559)
- Ridolfo Ghirlandaio (Italian, 1483–1561)
- Andrea del Sarto (Italian, 1486–1530)
- Correggio (Italian, 1490–1534), painter from Parma noted for illusionistic frescoes and altarpiece oils
- Giulio Romano (Italian, c. 1499–1546)

=== Venetian School (Early Renaissance, High Renaissance and Mannerism) ===
- Domenico Veneziano (Italian, 1400–1461), Early Renaissance
- Jacopo Bellini (Italian, 1400–1470), Early Renaissance
- Gentile Bellini (Italian, 1429–1507), Early Renaissance, noted for historical scenes of Venice and portraits of its doges
- Giovanni Bellini (Italian, 1430–1516), Early and High Renaissance, pioneer of luminous oil painting
- Bartolommeo Vivarini (Italian, 1432–1499), Early Renaissance
- Carlo Crivelli (Italian, 1435–1495), Early Renaissance
- Alvise Vivarini (Italian, 1445–1503), Early Renaissance
- Vittore Carpaccio (Italian, 1455–1526), Early Renaissance
- Giorgione (Italian, 1477–1510), High Renaissance, pioneer of Venetian School of painting
- Titian (Italian, c. 1488–1576), important High Renaissance-style exponent of colour painting in oils and frescoes
- Palma Vecchio (Italian, 1480–1528), High Renaissance
- Lorenzo Lotto (Italian, 1480–1556), High Renaissance
- Sebastiano del Piombo (Italian, 1485–1547), High Renaissance
- Jacopo Bassano (Italian, 1515–1592), Mannerist painter noted for portraiture and religious genre painting
- Tintoretto (Italian, 1518–1594), major Venetian Mannerist painter of monumental religious works
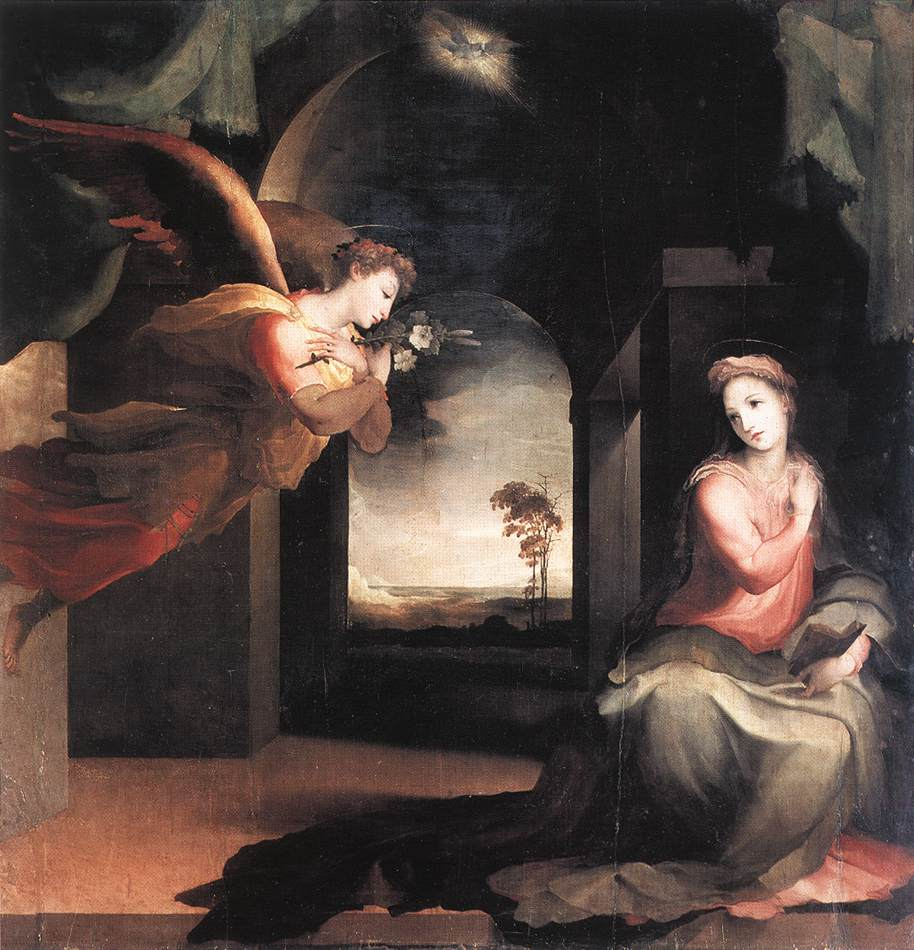
- The Annunciation by Beccafumi, 1545
  Paolo Veronese (Italian, c. 1528–1588), High Renaissance-style, one of Venice's leading colourists

=== Sienese School ===
- Giovanni di Paolo (Italian, 1403–1482), Early Renaissance
- Matteo di Giovanni (Italian, 1430–1495), Early Renaissance
- Francesco di Giorgio (Italian, 1439–1502), Early Renaissance
- Il Sodoma (Italian, 1477–1549), High Renaissance
- Beccafumi (Italian, 1486–1551), High Renaissance-Mannerist

=== Northern Renaissance ===
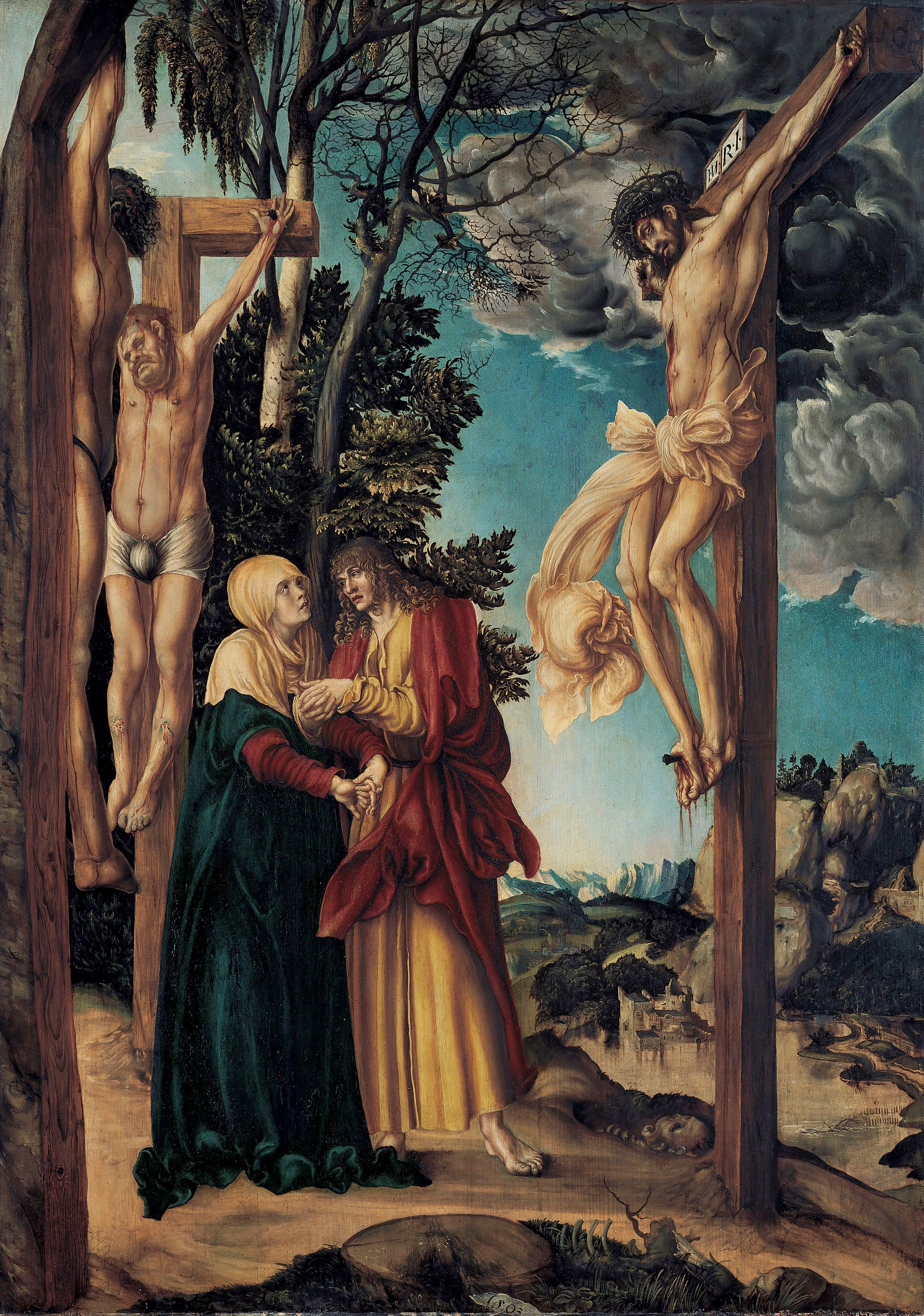
"Kreuzigung Christi" (English: "Crucifixion of Christ") by Lucas Cranach the Elder, 1503

- Robert Campin (Flemish, 1375–1444), Northern Renaissance artist who painted the "Mérode Altarpiece"
- Jan van Eyck (Flemish, c. 1390–1441), pioneer oil painter
- Konrad Witz (German, c. 1400–c. 1446)
- Rogier van der Weyden (Flemish, 1400–1464), Dutch artist and leading religious panel painter
- Stefan Lochner (German, c. 1410–1451), German painter of the Cologne School
- Petrus Christus (Flemish, c. 1410–c. 1476)
- Dirk Bouts (Flemish, 1420–1475)
- Simon Marmion (French, 1420–1489)
- Meister Francke (German, fl. 1424–1435)
- Hans Memling (German born-Flemish, 1430–1494), Flemish artist of the Bruges School
- Martin Schongauer (German, 1430–1491)
- Michael Pacher (Austrian 1435–1498)
- Hugo van der Goes (Flemish, 1440–1483), oil painter from the Netherlands
- Hieronymus Bosch (Dutch, Early Netherlandish, 1450–1516)
- Gerard David (Flemish, 1450–1523)
- Geertgen tot Sint Jans (Dutch, 1460–1490)
- Hans Holbein the Elder (German, 1460–1524)
- Quentin Matsys (Flemish, 1466–1530)
- Jan Mabuse (Flemish, 1470–1533)
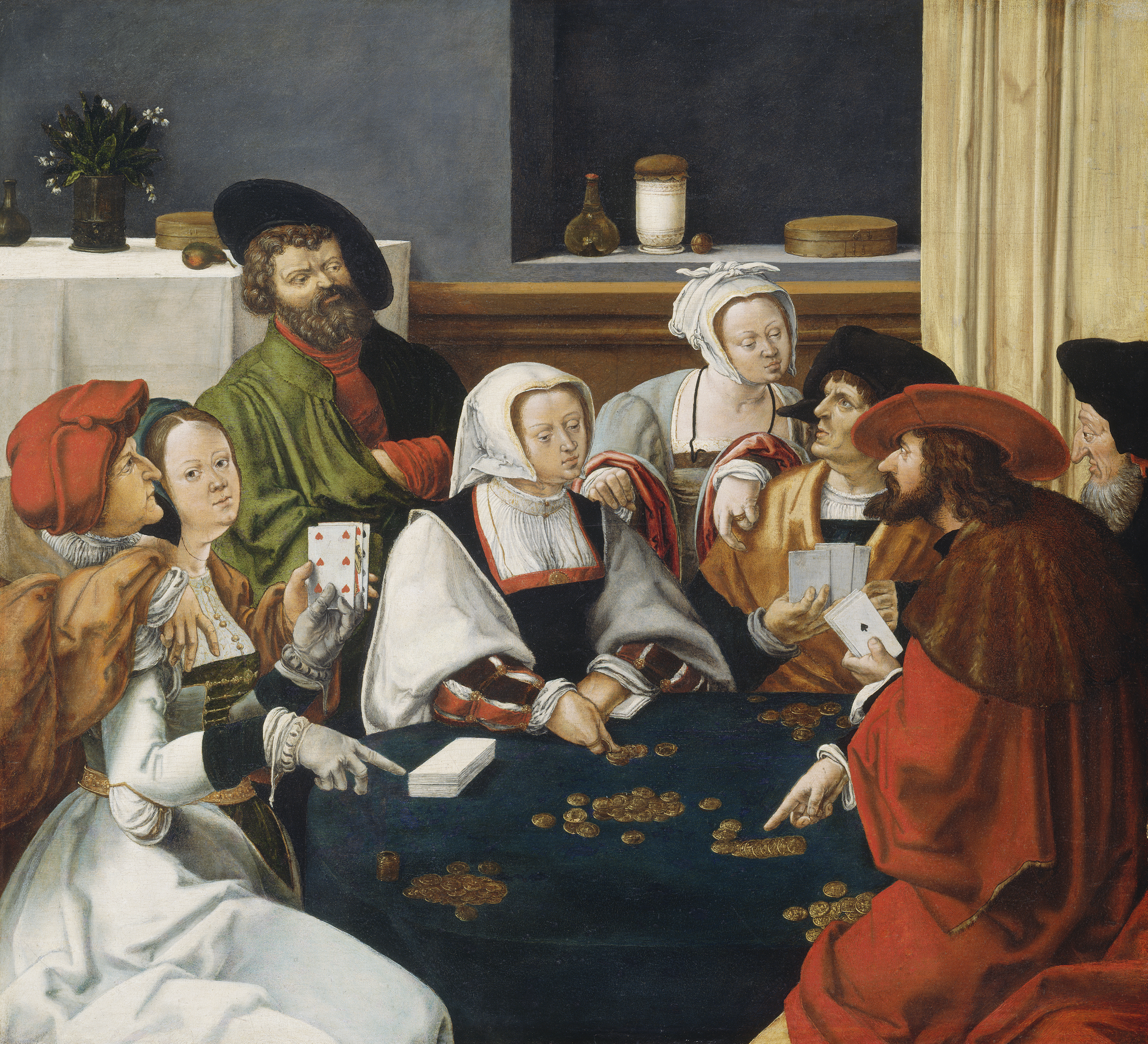
  Card Players by Lucas van Leyden, c. 1508
- Matthias Grünewald (German, 1470–1528), noted for his intense expressionist religious paintings
- Albrecht Dürer (German, 1471–1528), greatest painter and printmaker of the Northern Renaissance
- Lucas Cranach the Elder (German, 1472–1553), leading German Renaissance painter
- Hans Burgkmair (German, 1473–1531)
- Jean Clouet (French, 1475–1547)
- Albrecht Altdorfer (German, 1480–1538), Danube School of painting
- Maitre de Moulins (French, fl. 1480)
- Hans Baldung Grien (German, 1484–1545), German Renaissance artist
- Joachim Patenier (Flemish, 1485–1524), pioneer landscape painter of the Netherlandish Renaissance
- Joos van Cleve (Flemish, 1485–1540)
- Bernard van Orley (Flemish, 1488–1541)
- Hans Springinklee (German, 1490–1540)
- Wolf Huber (Austrian, 1490–1553)
- Lucas van Leyden (Dutch, 1494–1533)
- Jan van Scorel (Dutch, 1495–1562)
- Hans Holbein the Younger (German, 1497–1543), one of the greatest portrait painters
- Georg Pencz (German, 1500–1550)
- Sebald Beham (German, 1500–1550)
- Barthel Beham (German, 1502–1540)
- Lucas Cranach the Younger (German, 1515–1586)
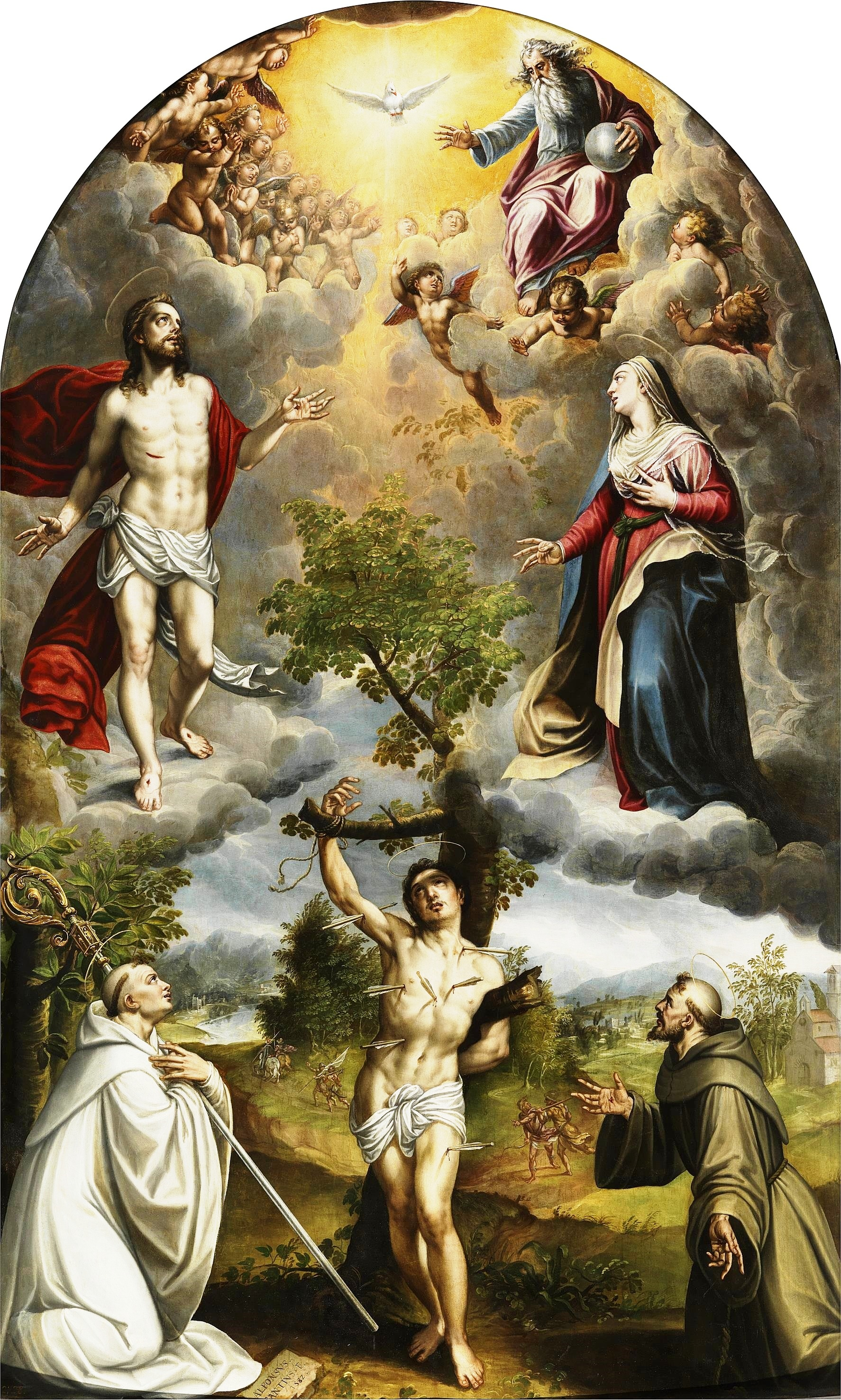
  Saint Sebastian between Saint Bernard and Saint Francis by Alonso Sánchez Coello, 1582
- Pieter Bruegel the Elder (Dutch, Flemish, c.1525–1569), leading artist of his day
- Aegidius Sadeler (Flemish, 1570–1629)

=== Spanish Renaissance ===
- Bartolomé Bermejo (Spanish, c. 1440–c. 1501)
- Alonso Berruguete (Spanish, c. 1488–1561)
- Luis de Morales (Spanish, 1512–1586)
- Alonso Sánchez Coello (Spanish-Portuguese, 1531–1588)
- El Greco (Greek-born Spanish, 1541–1614), noted for his dazzling spiritual works and portraits

=== Mannerism ===
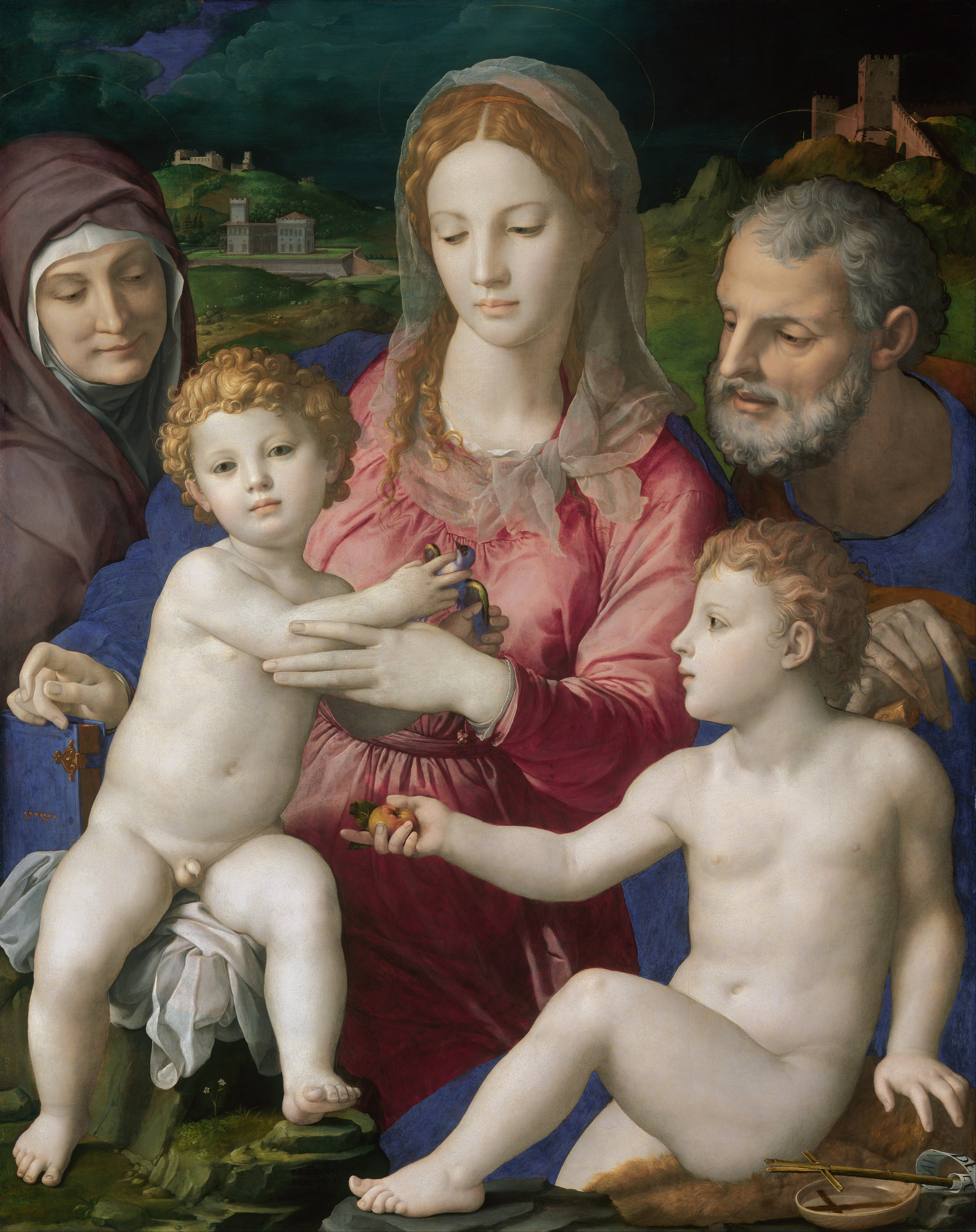
Holy Family with St. Anne and the Infant St. John by Agnolo Bronzino, c. 1545

- Dosso Dossi (Italian, 1479–1542)
- Alfonso Lombardi (Italian, 1487–1537)
- Bartolommeo Bandinelli (Italian, 1493–1560)
- Pontormo (Italian, 1494–1556), Florentine fresco/oil painter
- Rosso Fiorentino (Italian, 1494–1540)
- Maarten van Heemskerck (Dutch, 1498–1574)
- Alessandro Moretto (Italian, 1498–1555)
- Giulio Clovio (Croatian-born Italian, 1498–1578)
- Niccolo Tribolo (Italian, 1500–1550)
- Parmigianino (Italian, 1503–1540), Mannerist painter/etcher from Parma
- Bronzino (Italian, 1503–1572)
- Jacob Seisenegger (Austrian, 1505–1567)
- Pieter Aertsen (Dutch, 1508–1575)
- François Clouet (French 1510–1572)
- Giorgio Vasari (Italian, 1511–1575), known for his Lives of the Most Excellent Painters, Sculptors, and Architects
- Antonio Moro (Flemish, 1519–1576)
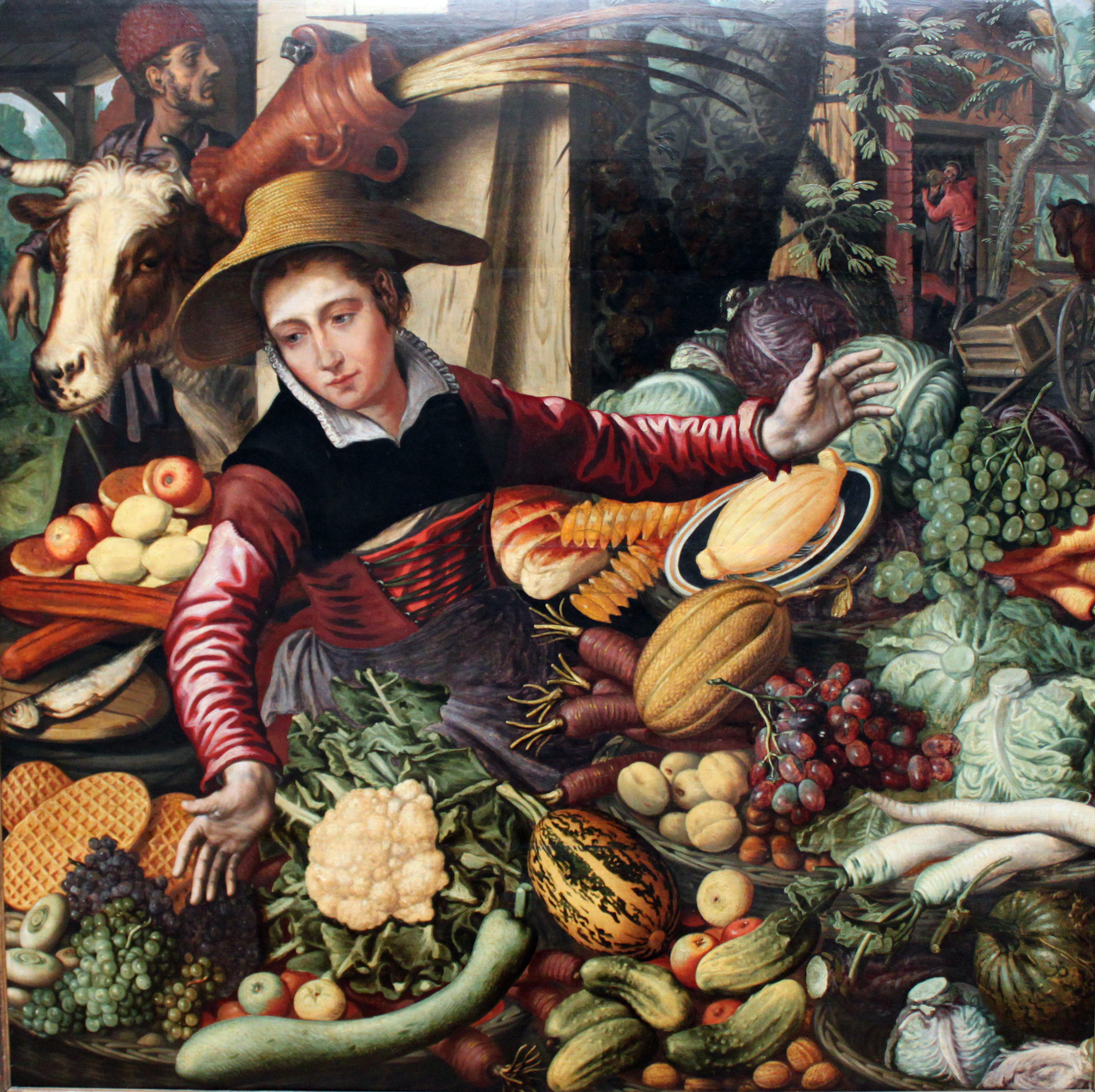
  The Vegetable Seller by Pieter Aertsen, 1567
- Giovanni Battista Moroni (Italian, 1525–1578)
- Federico Barocci (Italian, 1526–1612)
- Giuseppe Arcimboldo (Italian, 1527–1593), best known for his bizarre Mannerist fruit and vegetable portraits
- Giambologna (Italian, 1529–1608), hugely influential Mannerist sculptor
- Denis Calvaert (Flemish, 1540–1619)
- Scipione Pulzone (Italian, 1542–1598)
- Bartholomeus Spranger (Flemish, 1546–1611)
- Karel van Mander (Flemish, 1548–1606)
- Abraham Bloemaert (Dutch, 1566–1651)
- Joachim Wtewael (Dutch, 1566–1638)
- Adam Elsheimer (German, 1578–1610), influential German landscape and history painter who influenced Rubens

=== Baroque painting ===
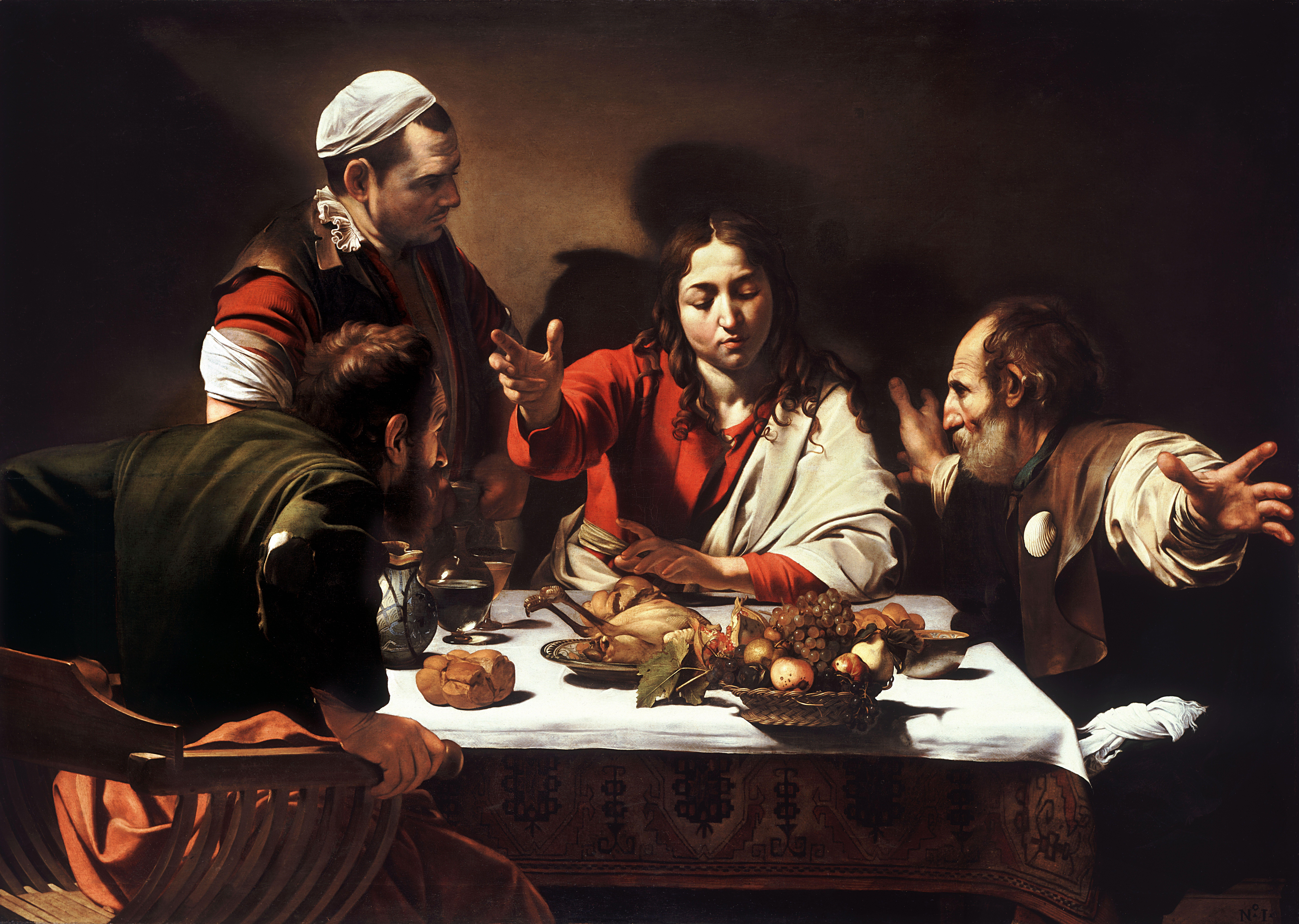
Supper at Emmaus by Caravaggio, 1601

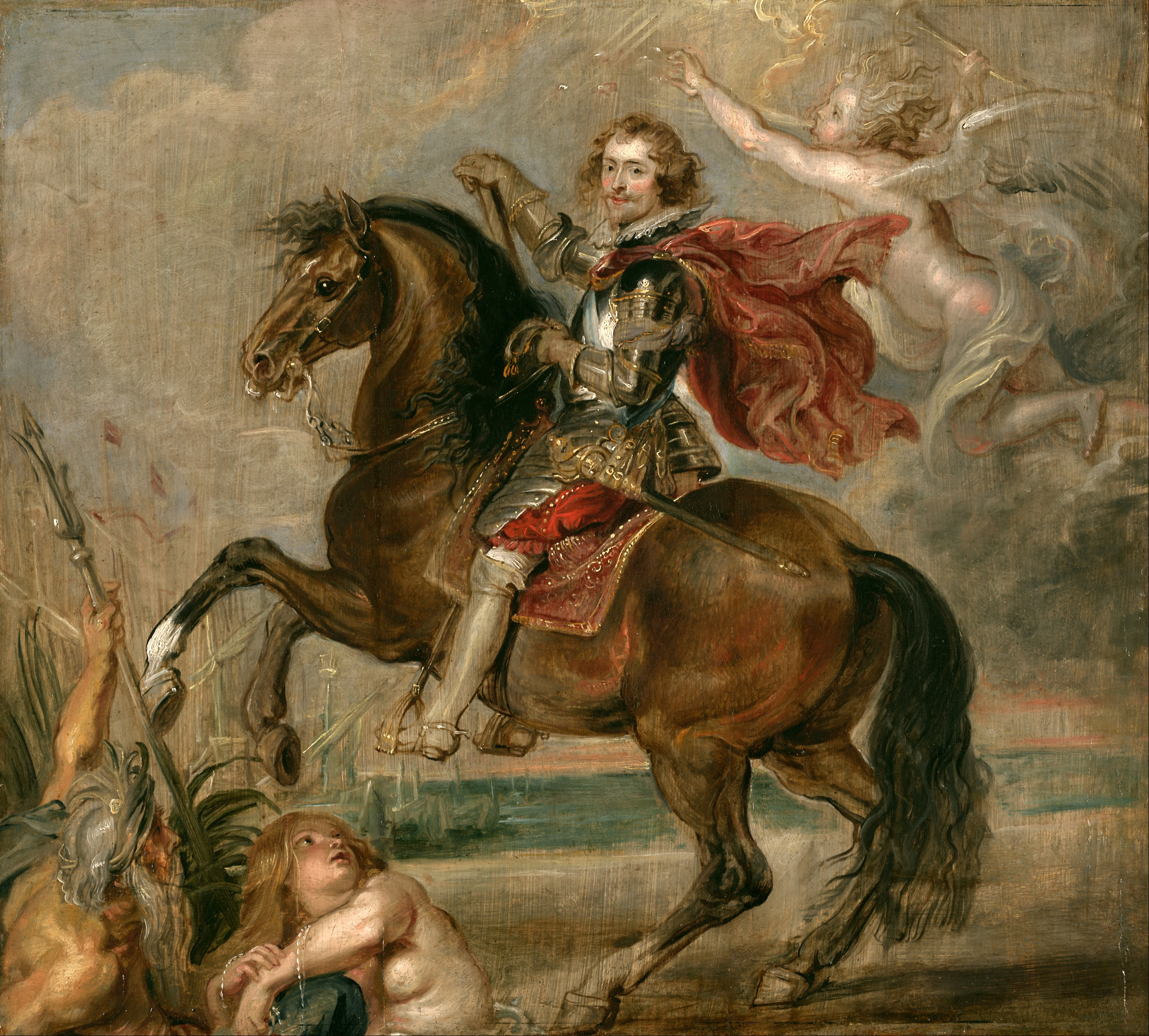
Portrait of George Villiers, 1st Duke of Buckingham by Peter Paul Rubens, c. 1625

Las Meninas by Diego Velázquez, 1656

- Antonio Tempesta (Italian, 1555–1630)
- Ludovico Carracci (Italian, 1555–1619)
- Bartolomeo Cesi (Italian, 1556–1629)
- Agostino Carracci (Italian, 1557–1602)
- Lodovico Cigoli (Italian, 1559–1613)
- Bartolomeo Carducci (Italian, 1560–1610)
- Annibale Carracci (Italian, 1560–1609), leader of the academism
- Orazio Gentileschi (Italian, 1563–1639)
- Hans Rottenhammer (German, 1564–1625)
- Pieter Brueghel the Younger (Flemish, 1564–1636)
- Francisco Pacheco (Spanish, 1564–1654)
- Francisco Ribalta (Spanish, 1565–1628)
- Jan Brueghel the Elder (Flemish, 1568–1625)
- Juan Martínez Montañés (Spanish, 1568–1649)
- Caravaggio (Italian, 1573–1610), noted for his figurative realism and Tenebrism
- Guido Reni (Italian, 1575–1642)
- Peter Paul Rubens (Flemish, 1577–1640), foremost Baroque history painter and portraitist
- Adam Elsheimer (German, 1578–1610)
- Bernardo Strozzi (Italian, 1581–1644)
- Juan Bautista Maíno (Spanish, 1581–1649)
- Johann Liss (German, 1590–1631)
- Jusepe de Ribera (Spanish, 1591–1652), Naples-based religious realist painter and printmaker
- Guercino (Italian, 1591–1666)
- Artemisia Gentileschi (Italian, 1592–1656)
- Georges de La Tour (French, 1593–1652)
- Jacob Jordaens (Flemish, 1593–1678)
- Louis Le Nain (French, 1593–1648)
- Nicolas Poussin (French, 1594–1665), main classical artist of his time
- Pietro da Cortona (Italian, 1596–1669), painter and architect
- Francisco de Zurbarán (Spanish, 1598–1664), master of chiaroscuro known for his religious paintings and still lifes
- Gian Lorenzo Bernini (Italian, 1598–1680), the dominant sculptor and architect of the era
- Antoine Le Nain (French, 1599–1648)
- Anthony van Dyck (Flemish, 1599–1641), portraitist living in London
- Diego Velázquez (Spanish, 1599–1660), regarded as the greatest artist of the Spanish Golden Age
- Claude Lorrain (French, 1600–1682), landscape artist
- Alonso Cano (Spanish, 1601–1667)
- Jan Brueghel the Younger (Flemish, 1601–1678)
- Mathieu Le Nain (French, 1607–1677)
- Giovanni Benedetto Castiglione (Italian, 1609–1664)
- Juan Bautista Martínez del Mazo (Spanish, c. 1612–1667)
- Mattia Preti (Italian, 1613–1699)
- Salvator Rosa (Italian, 1613–1673)
- Juan Carreño de Miranda (Spanish, 1614–1685)
- Carlo Dolci (Italian, 1616–1686)
- Bartolomé Esteban Murillo (Spanish, 1617–1682), one of the most influential religious painters
- Charles Le Brun (French, 1619–1690), leading painter in the court of Louis XIV
- Juan de Valdés Leal (Spanish, 1622–1690)
- Pedro de Mena (Spanish, 1628–1688)
- Luca Giordano (Italian, 1634–1705)

=== Dutch Golden Age and Flemish Baroque painting ===
The Concert by Gerard van Honthorst, 1623

- Roelant Savery (Flemish, 1576–1639)
- Frans Snyders (Flemish, 1578–1657), master of Baroque still life from the Antwerp School
- Frans Hals (Flemish-born Dutch, 1580–1666), one of the greatest post-Renaissance portraitists
- Pieter Lastman (Dutch, 1583–1633)
- Hendrick Terbrugghen (Dutch, 1588–1629), Dutch Realist genre painter and a leading member of the Utrecht Caravaggisti
- Gerrit van Honthorst (Dutch, 1590–1636)
- Dirck van Baburen (Dutch, 1595–1624)
- Matthias Stom (Dutch, 1600–1652)
- Adriaen Brouwer (Flemish, c. 1605–1638), noted for his tavern-based genre paintings
- Rembrandt van Rijn (Dutch, 1606–1669), history painting, portraits, etchings
- Jan Lievens (Dutch, 1607–1674)
- Jacob Adriaensz Backer (Dutch, 1608–1651)
- Ferdinand Bol (Dutch, 1616–1680)
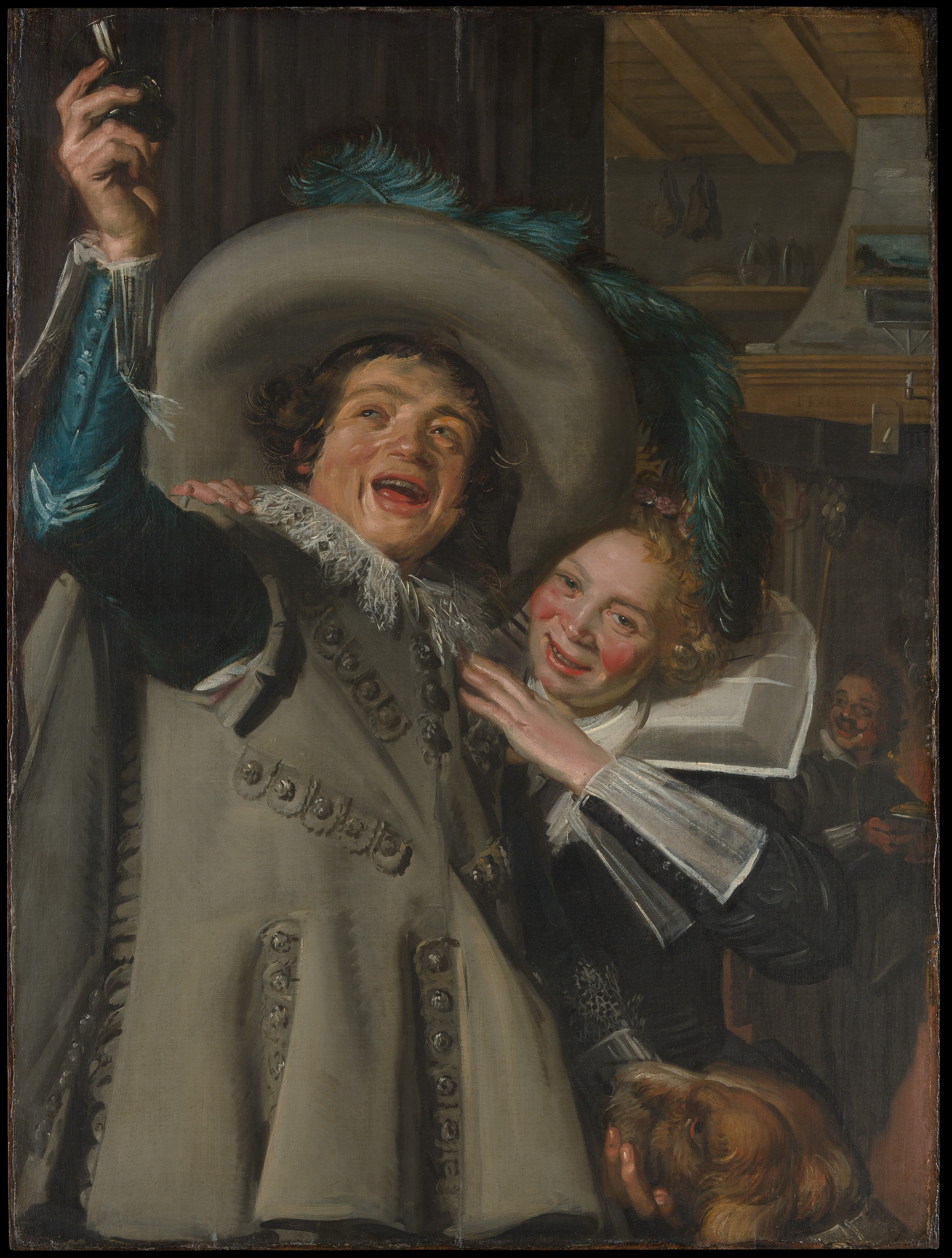
  Yonker Ramp and his sweetheart by Frans Hals, 1623
- Jan Havickszoon Steen (Dutch, 1625–1679), Leiden School, tavern genre scenes
- Jan Davidsz de Heem (Dutch, 1609–1683), still-life artist of the Utrecht/Antwerp School
- David Teniers the Younger (Flemish, 1610–1690), Dutch Realist known for his peasant/guardroom scenes
- Adriaen van Ostade (Dutch, 1610–1685), peasant scene artist of the Haarlem School
- Govert Flinck (Dutch, 1615–1660)
- Gerrit Dou (Dutch, 1613–1675)
- Frans van Mieris the Elder (Dutch, 1635–1681)
- Gerard Terborch (Dutch, 1617–1681), Haarlem School genre painter
- Willem Kalf (Dutch, 1619–1693), noted for still-life pictures
- Aelbert Cuyp (Dutch, 1620–1691), Dordrecht School landscape painter
- Samuel van Hoogstraten (Dutch, 1627–1678), genre painter
- Jan de Bray (Dutch, 1627–1697)
- Jacob van Ruisdael (Dutch, 1628–1682), Haarlem School landscape artist
- Gabriel Metsu (Dutch, 1629–1667), intimate small-scale genre scenes
- Pieter de Hooch (Dutch, 1629–1683), Delft School of Dutch genre painting
- Johannes Vermeer (Dutch, 1632–1675), Delft School Dutch genre painter, little-known in his own lifetime
- Meindert Hobbema (Dutch, 1638–1709)
- Aert de Gelder (Dutch, 1645–1727)
- Adriaen van der Werff (Dutch, 1659–1722)
- Rachel Ruysch (Dutch, 1664–1750), important female flower painter from Amsterdam
- Jan Roos (Flemish, 1591–1638), painter influencing the genoese school, known for his still life paintings of flowers and vegetables, mythological and religious scenes and portraits

=== Rococo ===
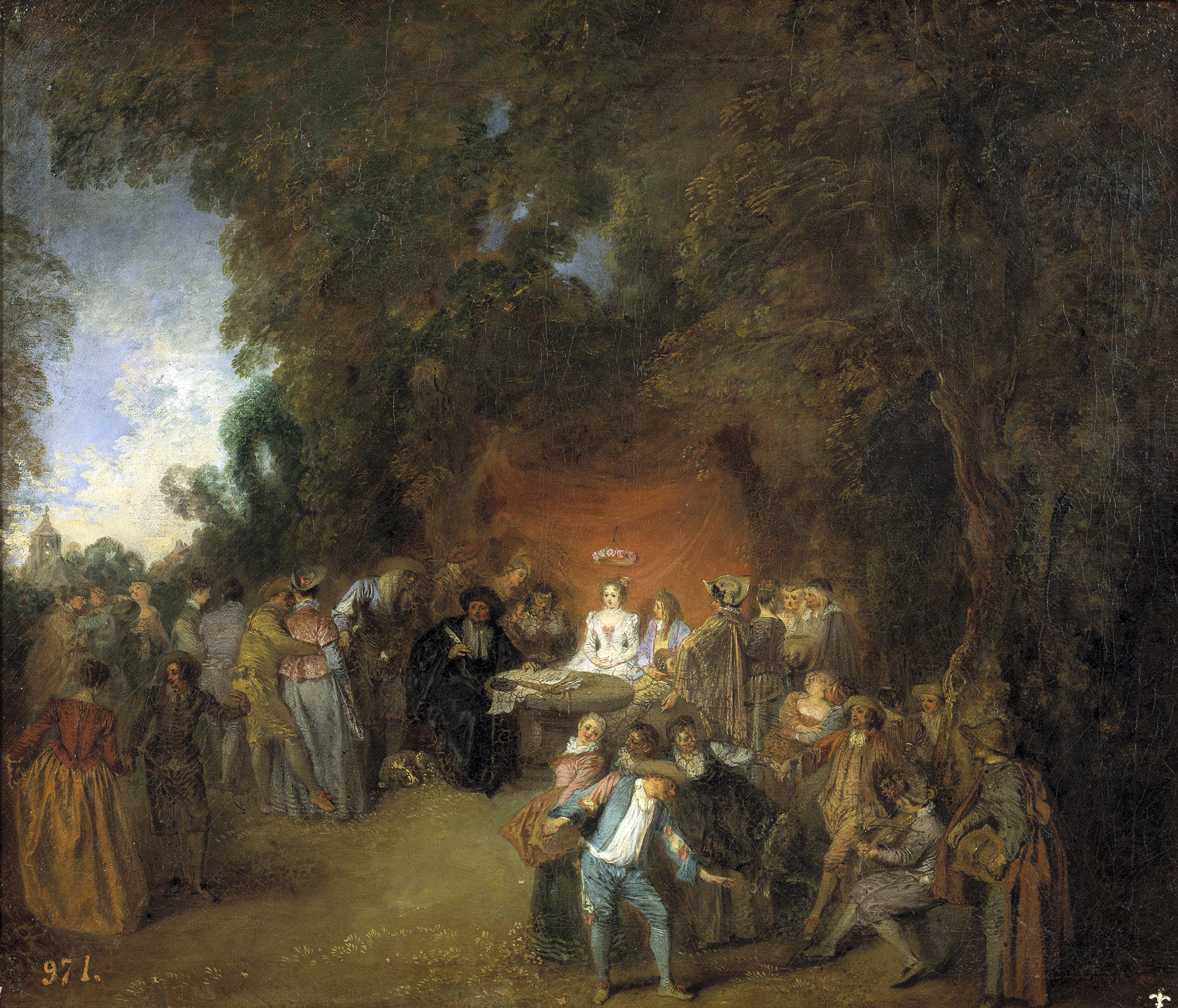
Capitulations of Wedding and Rural Dance by Antoine Watteau, 1711

- Giovanni Battista Piazzetta (Italian, 1682–1754), master of the fresco
- Jean-Antoine Watteau (French, 1684–1721), author of the first fête galante
- Giovan Battista Pittoni (Italian, 1687–1767), known for sacred families and children
- Giovanni Battista Tiepolo (Italian, 1691–1770), known for his frescoes, as in Würzburg Residence
- Jean-Baptiste-Siméon Chardin (French, 1699–1779), important 18th-century still-life artist
- François Boucher (French, 1703–1770), noted for female nudes
- Charles-André van Loo (French, 1705– 1765), painter of portraiture, religion, mythology, allegory, and genre scenes.
- Pompeo Batoni (Italian, 1708–1787)
- Martin Johann Schmidt (Austrian, 1718–1801), important 18th-century Austrian Late Baroque painter
- Jean-Baptiste Greuze (French, 1725–1805), important 18th-century painter
- François-Hubert Drouais (French, 1727– 1775), French portraitist to the royal family, King Louis XV and Queen Marie Leczinska, and members of the nobility
- Jean-Honoré Fragonard (French, 1732–1806)
- Louise Élisabeth Vigée Le Brun (French, 1755–1842), later Neoclassical

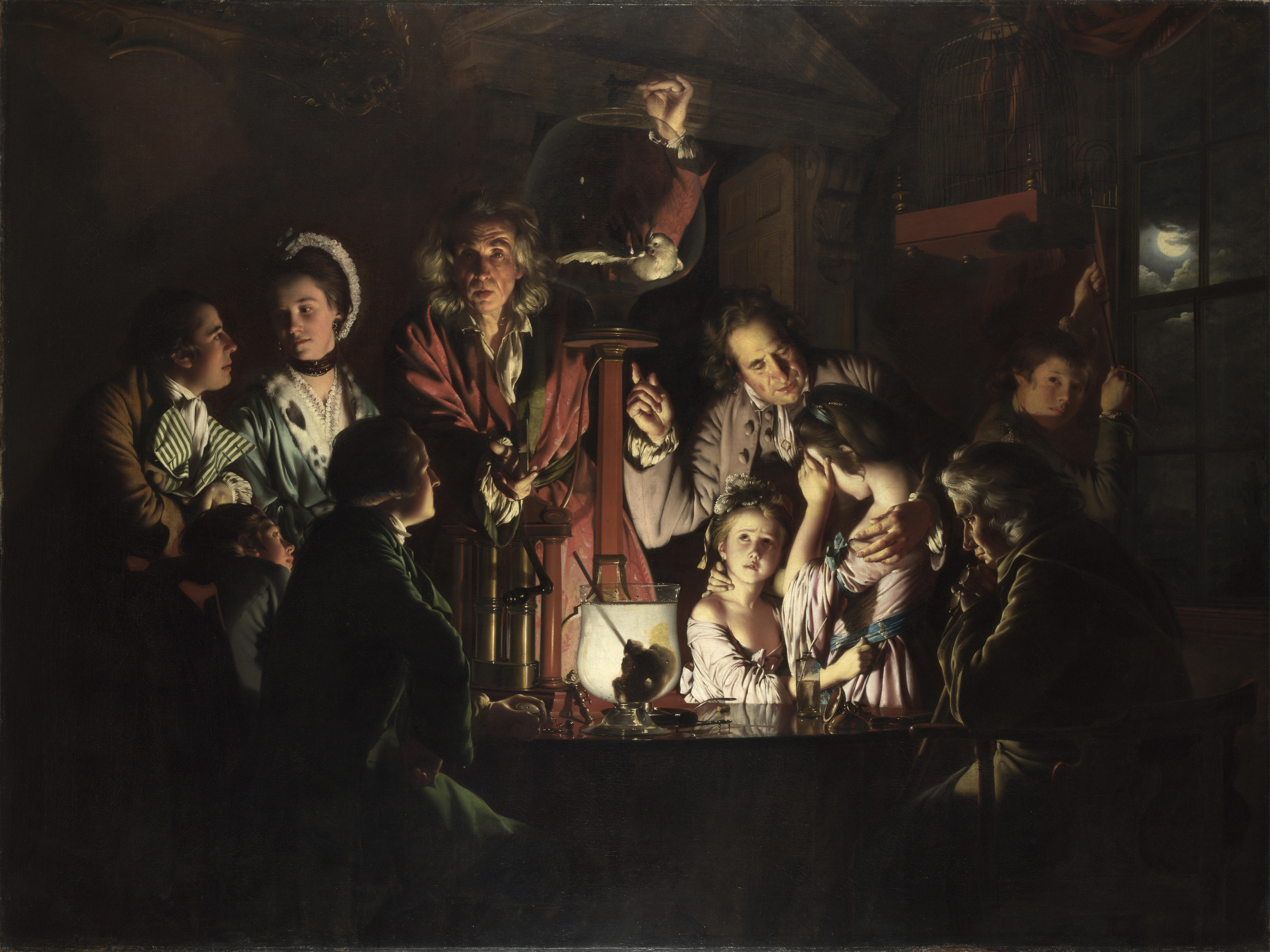
An Experiment on a Bird in an Air Pump by Joseph Wright of Derby, 1768

=== British ===
- Nicholas Hilliard (English, c. 1547–1619), goldsmith, limner, and painter best known for his portrait miniatures of Elizabethan nobility
- William Dobson (English, 1611–1646)
- John Michael Wright (English-Scottish, c. 1617–1694)
- Peter Lely (Dutch-born English, 1618–1680)
- Godfrey Kneller (English, 1646–1723)
- James Thornhill (English, c. 1675–1734)
- William Hogarth (English, 1697–1764)
- Allan Ramsay (Scottish, 1713–1784)
- Joshua Reynolds (English, 1723–1792)
- Thomas Gainsborough (English, 1727–1788)
- Joseph Wright of Derby (English, 1734–1797)
- George Romney (English, 1734–1802)
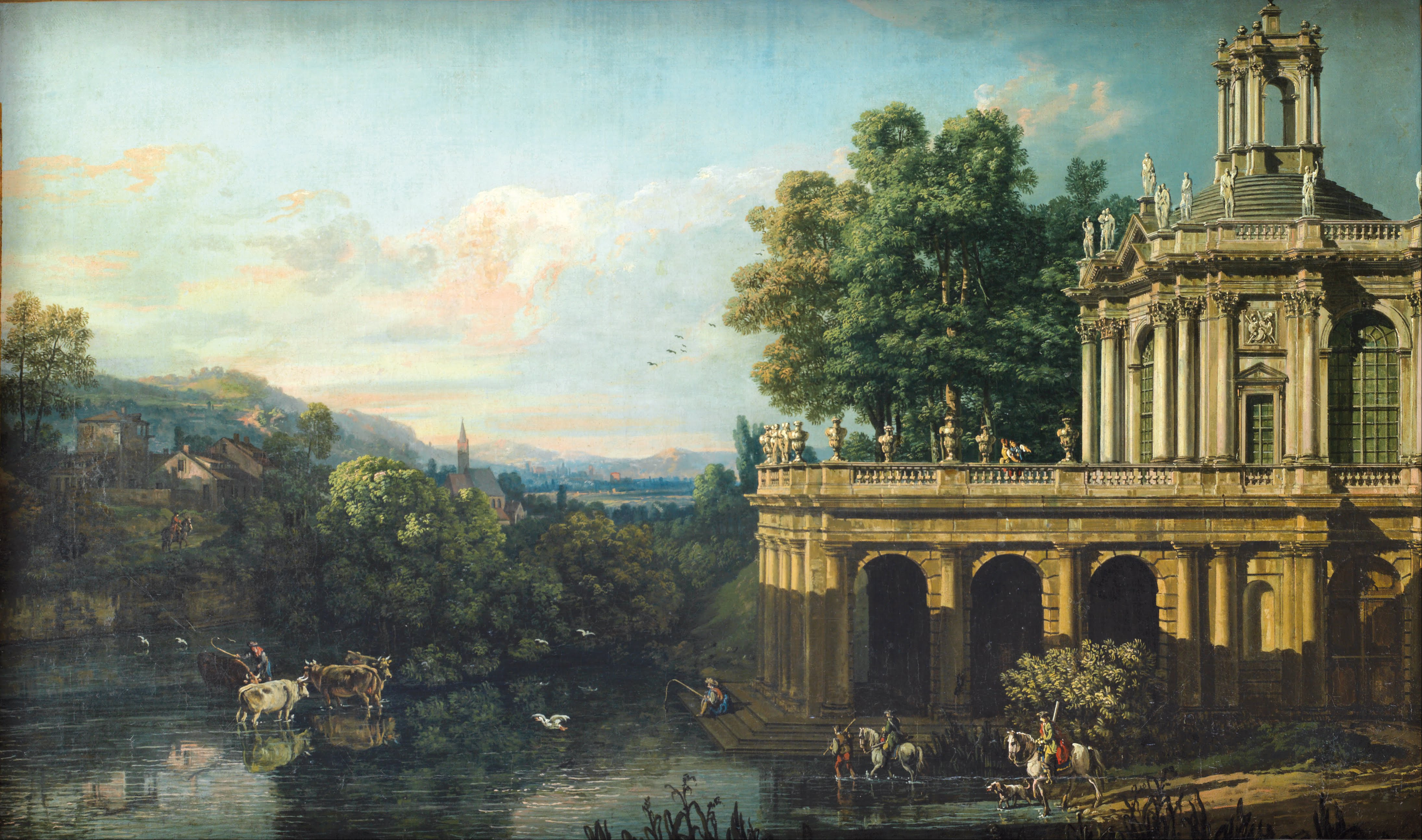
- Architectural Caprice with a Palace by Bernardo Bellotto, 1765
  The Vow of Louis XIII by Jean-Auguste-Dominique Ingres, 1824
  John Opie (English, 1761–1807)
- Thomas Lawrence (English, 1769–1830)

=== Vedutism ===
- Canaletto (Italian, 1697–1768), famous for vedutas of Venice
- Giovanni Paolo Panini (Italian, 1691–1765)
- Francesco Zuccarelli (Italian, 1702–1789), known for Arcadian landscapes
- Francesco Guardi (Italian, 1712–1793), view painter of Venice School
- Giambattista Piranesi (Italian, 1720–1778)
- Bernardo Bellotto (Italian, 1720–1780), Canaletto's nephew depicting Warsaw

=== Neoclassicism ===
- Anton Raphael Mengs (German, 1728–1779), friend of Johann Joachim Winckelmann
- Johann Zoffany (German, 1733–1810)
- Benjamin West (American-born British, 1738–1820)
- Angelica Kauffman (Swiss-born, 1741–1807)
- Jacques-Louis David (French, 1748–1825), chief artist of the French Revolution and Napoleon
- Antoine-Jean Gros (French, 1771–1835), pupil of Jacques-Louis David
- Jean Auguste Dominique Ingres (French, 1780–1867)

=== Romanticism ===
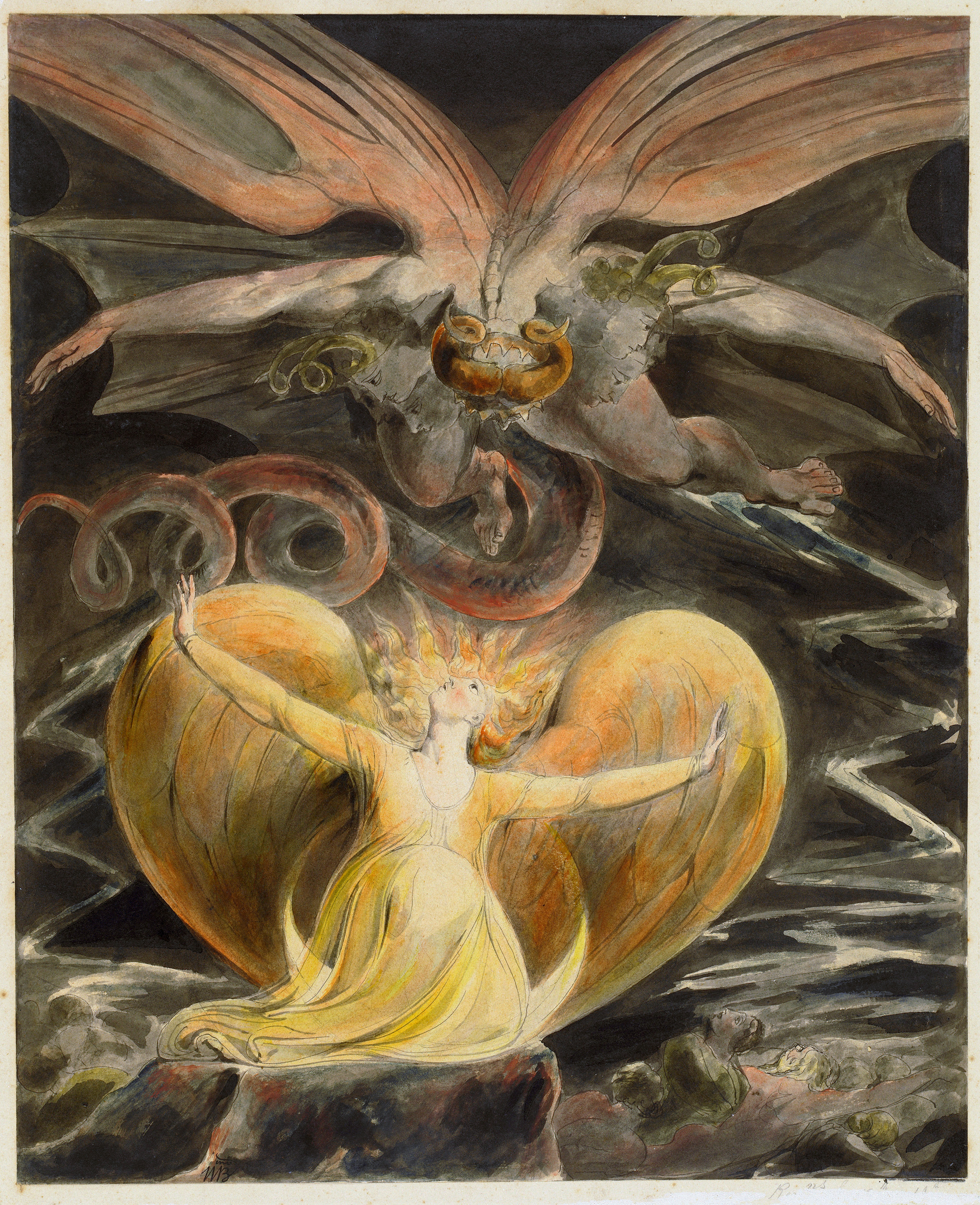
The Great Red Dragon and the Woman Clothed with the Sun by William Blake, circa 1805

- Hubert Robert (French, 1733–1808), painter noted for picturesque depictions of ruins
- Francisco de Goya (Spanish, 1746–1828)
- Henry Raeburn (Scottish, 1756–1823)
- William Blake (British, 1757–1827), symbolist religious painter, printmaker and book illustrator
- Caspar David Friedrich (German, 1774–1840)
- J. M. W. Turner (English, 1775–1851)
- John Constable (English, 1776–1837)
- Théodore Géricault (French, 1791–1824)
- Eugène Delacroix (French, 1798–1863)

== See also ==
- Master printmaker
- Old master print
