= Juan Bautista Maíno =

Spanish painter

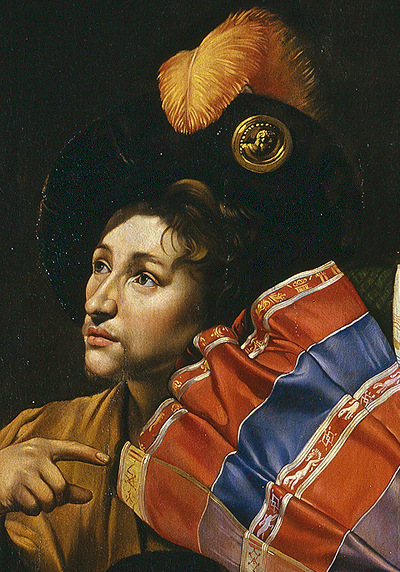
Detail from Adoration of the Magi; generally believed to be a self-portrait

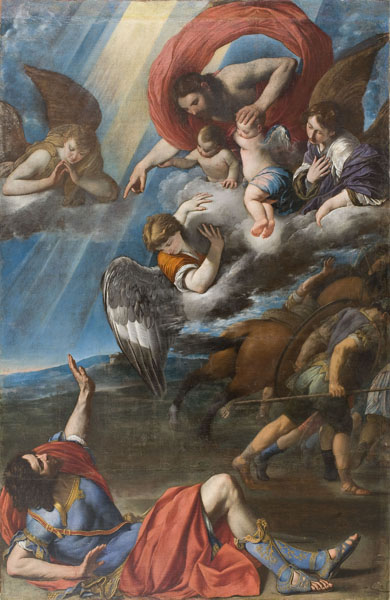
The Conversion of Saint Paul

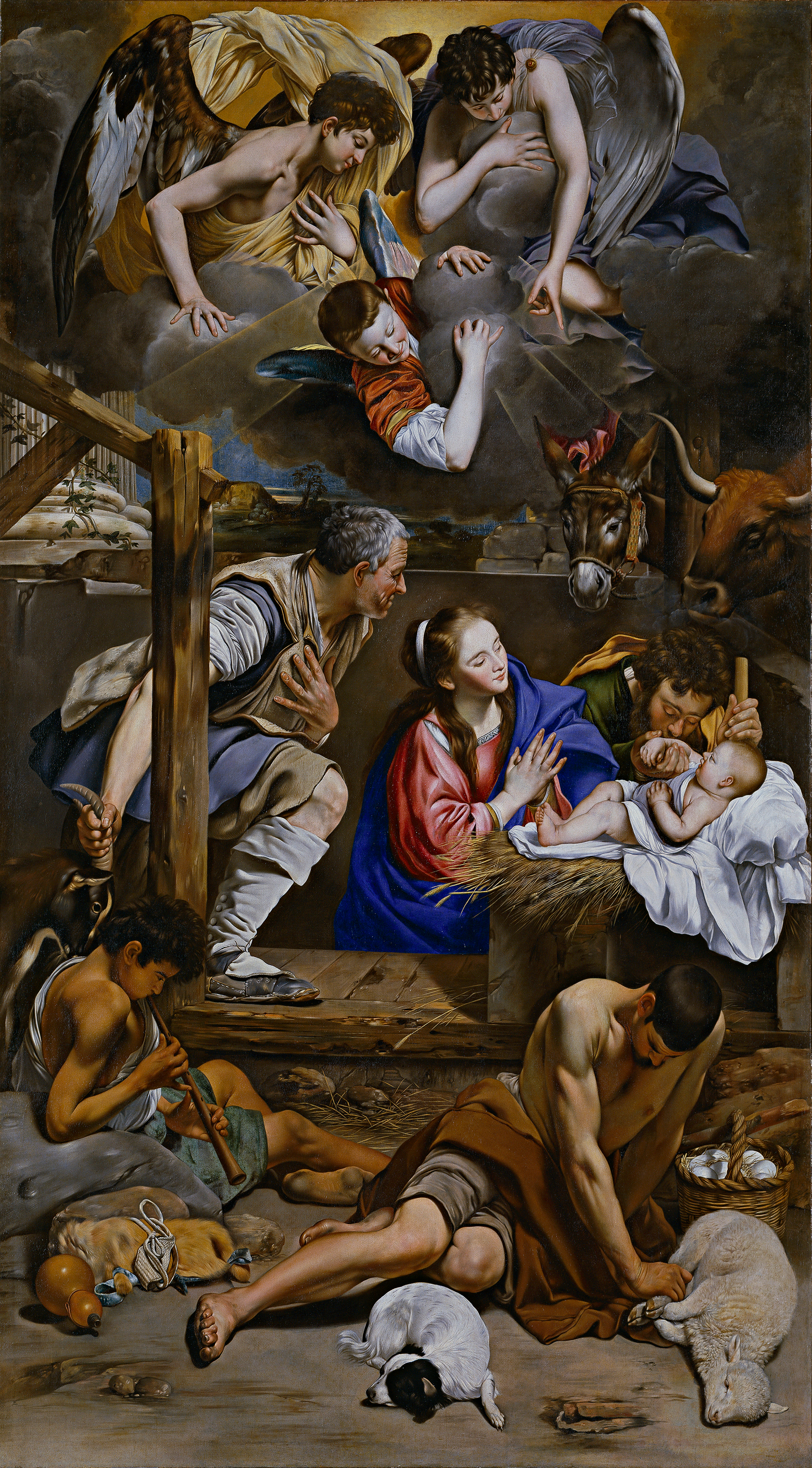
Adoration of the Shepherds

Friar Juan Bautista Maíno, or Mayno (October 1581, Pastrana – 1 April 1649, Madrid) was a Spanish Baroque painter.

== Biography ==
His father was a merchant who sold Milanese fabrics and his mother was a Portuguese noblewoman. Both were at the service of Ana de Mendoza, Princess of Eboli, who was also the Duchess of Pastrana. Some historians believe that he trained with El Greco, but no documentary evidence has been found. It is known for certain that he spent the years 1600 to 1608 in Italy, where he became familiar with, and was influenced by, the works of Caravaggio and his students Orazio Gentileschi, Guido Reni and Annibale Carracci. When he returned to Pastrana, he revealed those influences in a "Trinity", painted for the side altar at the Monasterio de Concepcionistas Franciscanas.

In March 1611, he moved to Toledo and, the following year, painted an "Altarpiece of the Four Days of Easter" for the Dominicans, which is now at the Museo del Prado. It is, perhaps, his best known work. Also notable are canvases depicting the "Adoration of the Magi" and the "Adoration of the Shepherds".

In June 1613, he entered the Dominican Order and took up residence at the Monastery of San Pedro Mártir. This reduced his artistic activity, although he created other versions of the "Adoration of the Shepherds", one of which is at the Hermitage in Saint Petersburg. Another may be seen at the Meadows Museum in Dallas.

King Philip III called him to his Court in 1620, to teach drawing to his son, the future King Philip IV. At that time, Maíno became a sponsor of the young Diego Velázquez; choosing him, in a contest, to paint an "Expulsion of the Moors", which helped establish him at court. That painting did not survive the disastrous fire at the Royal Alcázar of Madrid in 1734.

He died at the Colegio y convento de Santo Tomás in Madrid. Friar Juan Rizi may have been one of his students there.

== Selected works ==
- Conversión de San Pablo (Conversion of Saint Paul) (c. 1614, MNAC, Barcelona)
- Retablo de San Pedro Mártir de Toledo (1612–14, Museo del Prado)
- Retablo de la Anunciación (Museo del Prado)
- Resurrección de Cristo (Gemäldegalerie Alte Meister, Dresden)
- Pentecostés (Pentecost) (1615–20, Museo del Prado)
- Retrato de caballero (Portrait of a Knight) (1618–23, Museo del Prado)
- San Jacinto (Saint Hyacinth) (1620–24, San Pedro Mártir, Toledo)
- Retrato de Felipe IV (Portrait of Philip IV) (1623–25, Bayerisches Nationalmuseum, Munich), miniature.
- Retrato de caballero (Portrait of a Knight) (1625, Bayerisches Nationalmuseum, Munich), miniature.
- San Agabo (The Bowes Museum, County Durham)
- Adoración de los pastores (Adoration of the Shepherds) (Hermitage Museum, Saint Petersburg)
- Adoración de los pastores (Adoration of the Shepherds) (Meadows Museum, Dallas)
- Retrato del arzobispo José de Melo (Portrait of Archbishop José de Melo) (Cabildo Catedralicio, Evora Cathedral)
- Santo Domingo en Soriano (Saint Dominic in Soriano) (1629, Museo del Prado)
- Santo Domingo en Soriano (Saint Dominic in Soriano) (1629, Hermitage Museum, Saint Petersburg)
- Retablo de los Miranda (c. 1629, Colegiata, Pastrana)
- Recuperación de Bahía de Todos los Santos en Brasil (Recapture of Bahía (de Todos os Santos) in Brazil) (1634–35, Museo del Prado)
- Retrato de un monje dominico (Portrait of a Dominican Monk) (1635–40, Ashmolean Museum, Oxford)
- Fray Alonso de Santo Tomás (1648–49, Museo Nacional d'Art de Catalunya, Barcelona)
- The Penitent Magdalene (1611 - 1614, The Spanish Gallery,Bishop Auckland, County Durham)
- Saint Antony of Padua with the Christ Child (1608, The Spanish Gallery, Bishop Auckland, County Durham)
