= Adoration of the Magi (Maino) =

Painting by Fray Juan Bautista Maíno

The Adoration of the Magi
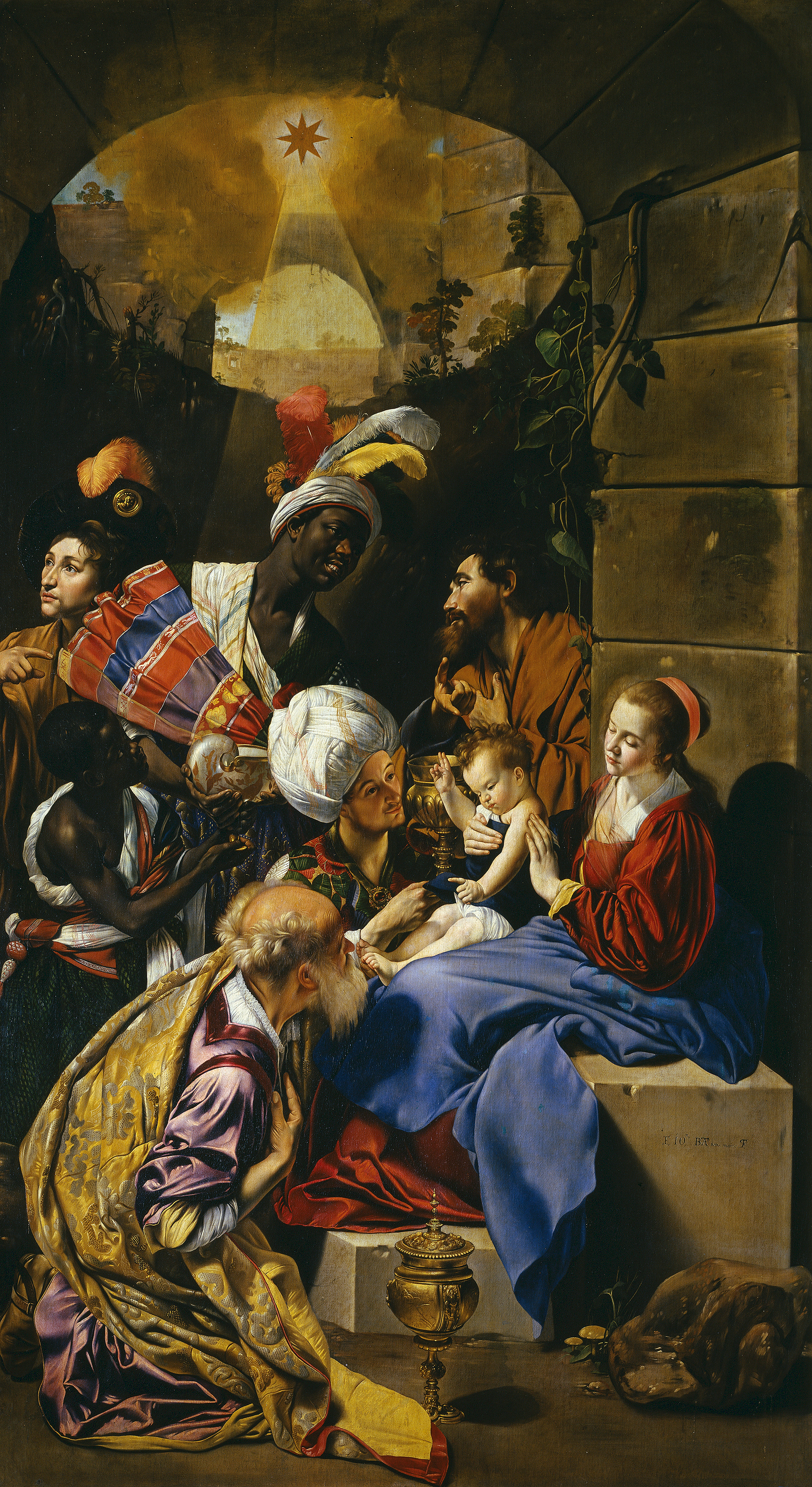
- Year: 1612
- Medium: oil paint, canvas
- Dimensions: 315 cm (124 in) × 174.5 cm (68.7 in)
- Location: Museo del Prado
- Accession: P000886

The Adoration of the Magi or La Adoracion de los Reyes Magos (circa 1612) is a painting by Juan Bautista Maíno in the Museo del Prado, in Madrid.

On 14 February 1612 Fray Juan Bautista Maíno signed the contract to make two pendant paintings of the nativity for the monastery church of San Pedro Mártir in Toledo, Spain. The next year in June, he entered the Dominican Order and took up residence at the Monastery of San Pedro Mártir. The man on the left in a pilgrim's hat pointing at the infant Jesus is said to be a self-portrait.

== Provenance ==
Together with its pendant, this painting presumably remained in its position on the right of a sculpted centerpiece of the holy virgin in the high altar (retablo) for centuries, until it was removed to Madrid, Spain as part of the sweeping confiscation of church property in Spain named Mendizábal confiscations. This series of art nationalizations of so-called "Carlist religious art" were named after the prime minister under Queen Isabella II of Spain. The pendant paintings were part of the inventory of what became known locally in Madrid as Museo de la Trinidad in 1837. From there the pair of paintings eventually joined the Prado in 1872.

== Modern reconstruction of original installation ==
Both paintings were on loan to the National Gallery, London from September 2016 until January 2017 where they formed a Toledo complement to the "Beyond Caravaggio" exhibition. After that exhibition, the University of Castilla–La Mancha published a reconstruction of the original high altar in 2017 that has since been reconstructed in situ in the surviving Toledo retablo, thanks to modern reproductions made from high-resolution Prado images.

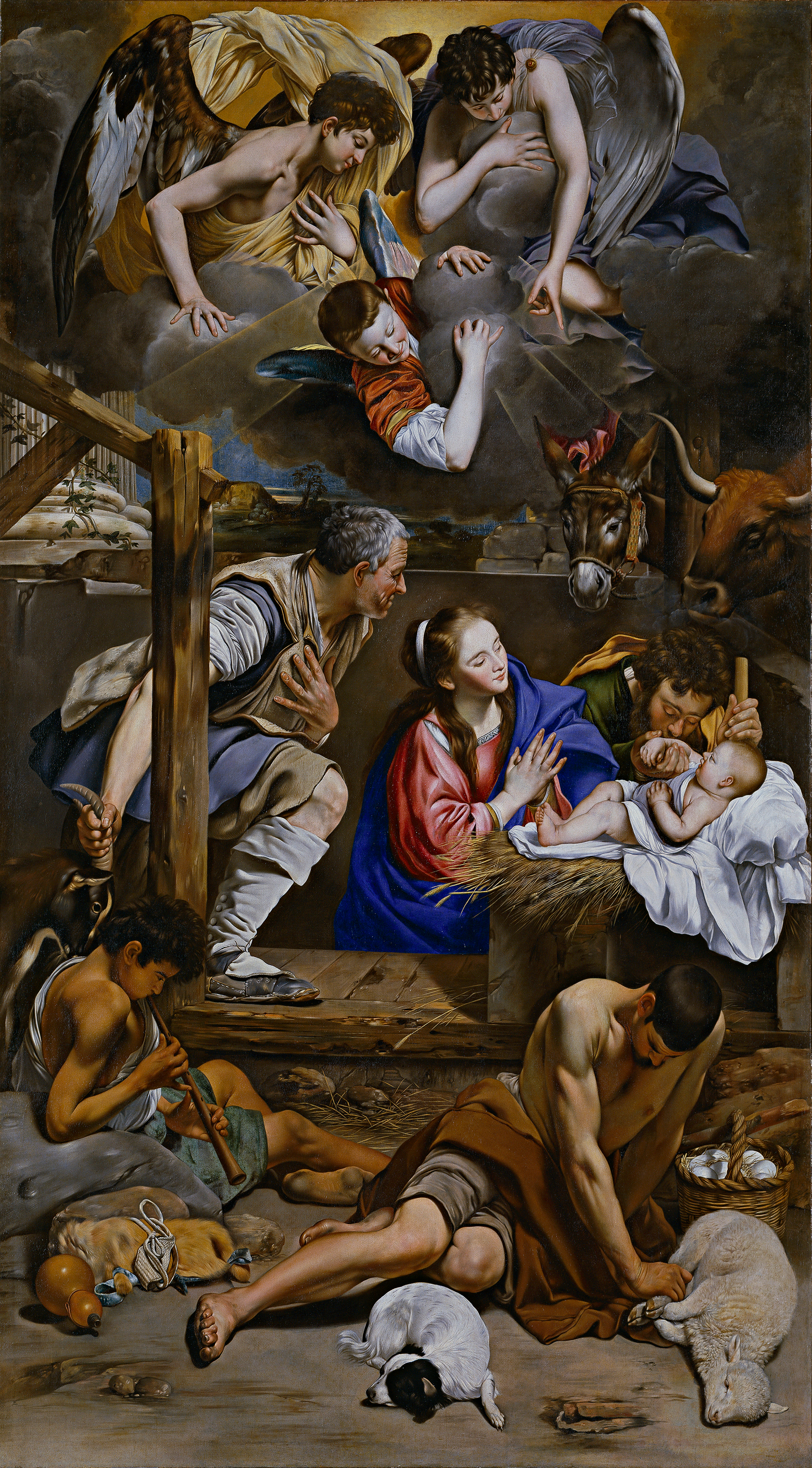
Adoration of the Shepherds (pendant)
