= The Conversion of Saint Paul (Rubens, London) =

Painting by Peter Paul Rubens

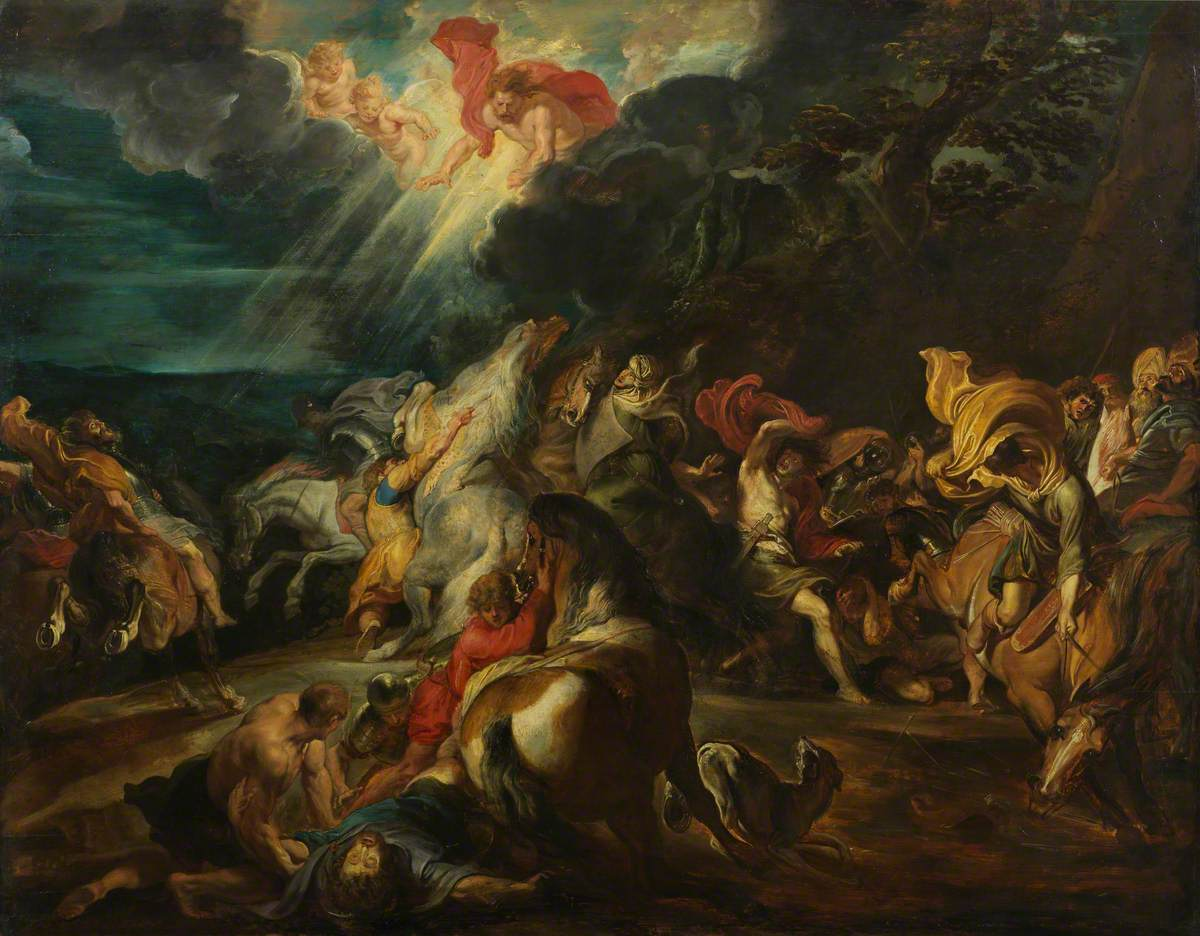
- Artist: Peter Paul Rubens
- Year: 1610-1612
- Medium: Oil on panel
- Dimensions: 92.2 cm × 120.7 cm (36.3 in × 47.5 in)
- Location: Courtauld Gallery, London
- Accession: P.1978.PG.357

The Conversion of Saint Paul is a painting by Peter Paul Rubens, now in the Courtauld Gallery in London. It shows the conversion of Saint Paul and was produced between 1610 and 1612. Between around 1612 and 1614, The Defeat of Sennacherib was produced by the artist as a pendant to it.

== Other versions ==
Rubens produced works on the subject on at least two other occasions - once alone in the 1620s (now lost) and once with his studio at an unknown date (now in the Rubenshuis in Antwerp).
