= The Defeat of Sennacherib =

Painting by Peter Paul Rubens

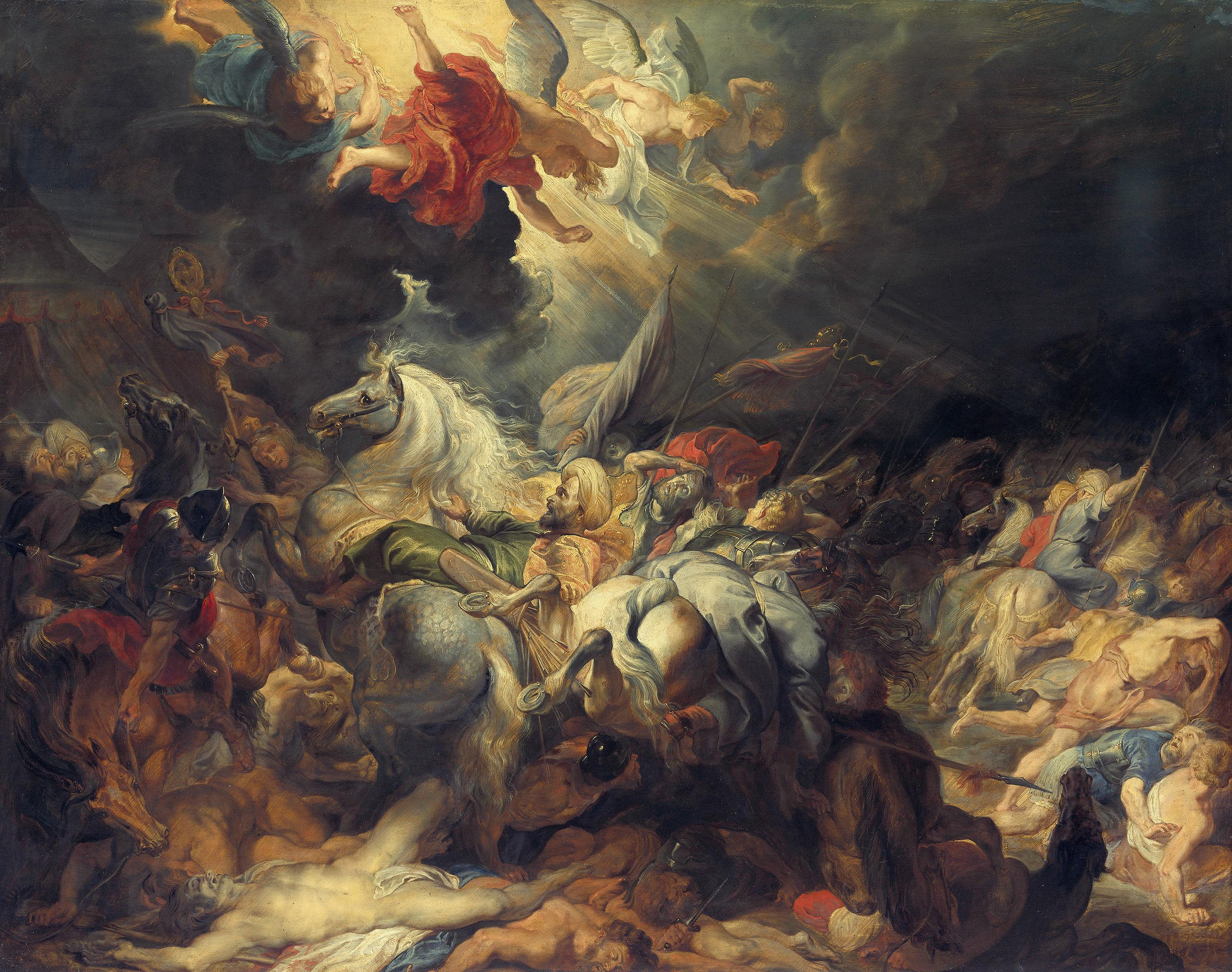
The Defeat of Sennacherib (ca. 1612–1614) by Rubens

The Defeat of Sennacherib is an oil-on-panel painting by Peter Paul Rubens, now in the Alte Pinakothek in Munich, produced ca.1612–1614. It shows the defeat of the army of Sennacherib by an angel, as described in 2 Kings:19. It is a pendant to The Conversion of Saint Paul, now in the Courtauld Gallery in London.
