= Master of Latin 757 =

Italian illuminator of manuscripts

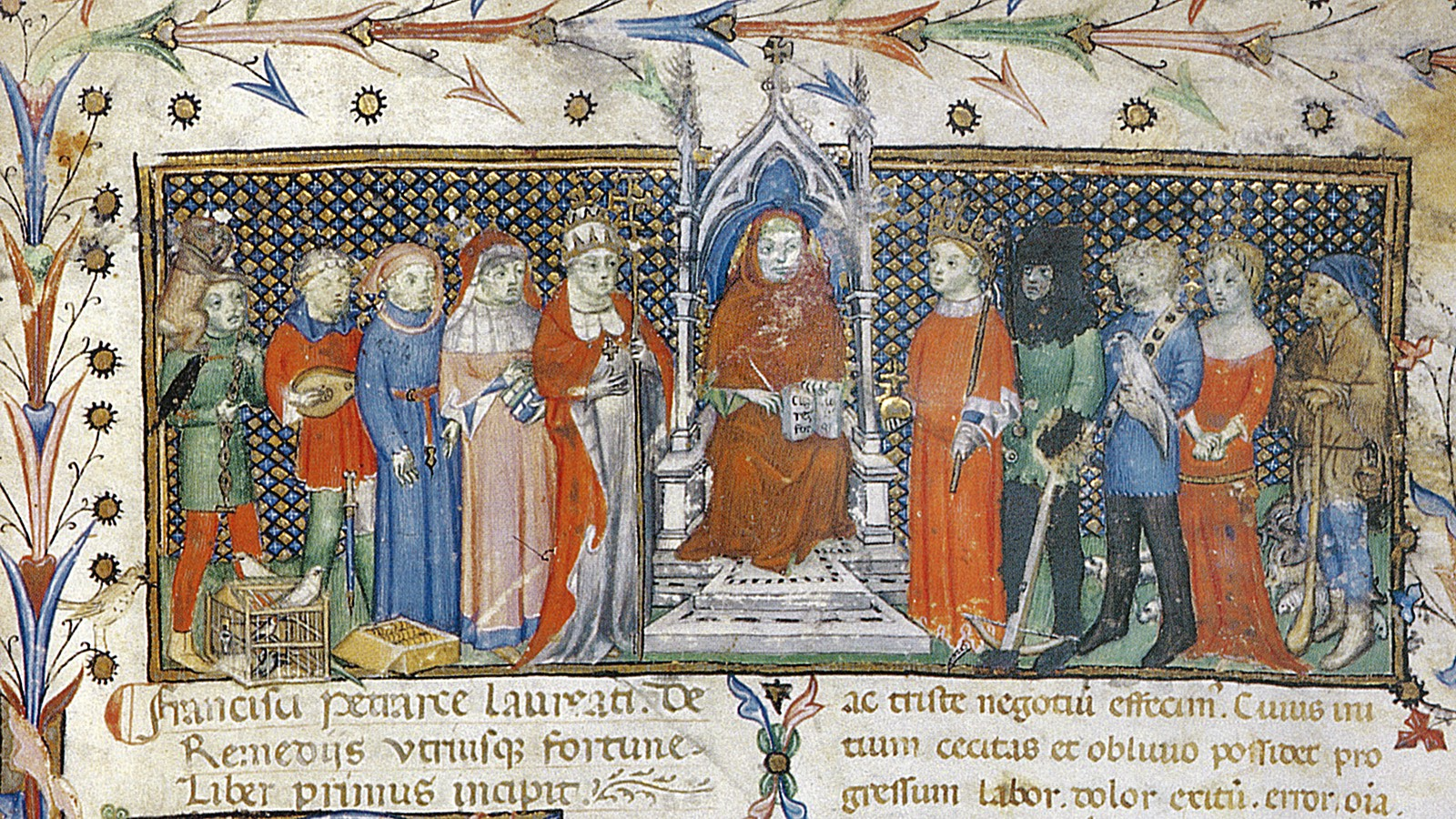
The Estates of Man, Milanese manuscript of Francesco Petrarch's De Remediis Utriusque Fortunae, attributed to the master.

The Master of Latin 757 (fl c. 1380–1395), or the "Lancelot Master", is the name given to a Lombard painter of illuminated manuscripts whose work is very poorly known. He was the leading illuminator for the Visconti court in Milan. Three manuscripts, all in the Bibliothèque nationale de France in Paris, were first ascribed to him by Pietro Toesca; these include a combined Book of Hours and Missal, one called Lancelot du lac, and several folios of a handbook on health, the Tacuinum sanitatis. A number of other works have since been grouped with these; only the Book of Hours/Missal, however, appears to have been completed in a single, homogeneous style.
