= The Conversion of Saint Paul (Maíno) =

1614 painting by Juan Bautista Maíno

- La conversión de san Pablo (Spanish)
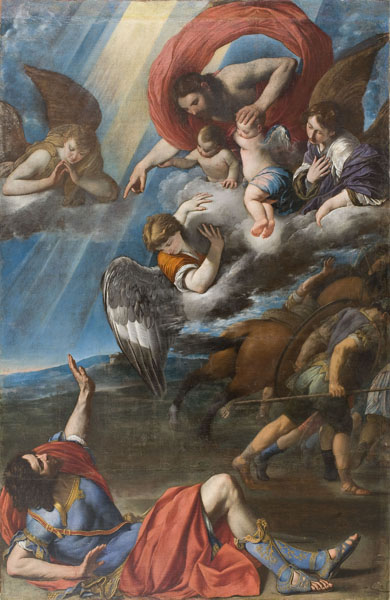
- Artist: Juan Bautista Maíno
- Year: 1614
- Type: Oil on canvas
- Dimensions: 244.5 cm × 157 cm (96.3 in × 62 in)
- Location: National Museum of Art of Catalonia

The Conversion of St. Paul (Spanish: La conversión de san Pablo) is a 1614 painting by Juan Bautista Maíno, located in the collection of the National Museum of Art of Catalonia (MNAC).

The work was attributed to the painter in 2011 and was restored in 2012 with the help of the international bank BNP Paribas. According to the museum's experts, The Conversion of Saint Paul is one of the few remaining works painted by Maino, who is credited with introducing the figurative painting-style of Caravaggio and other early seventeenth-century Roman painters to Spain. The MNAC also has the portrait of Fray Alonso de Santo Tomás (1648–1649), which is one of Maíno's last works.

== History ==
The Conversion of St. Paul presents a quality of Juan Bautista Maíno's works which is characteristic of his years of residence in Rome. When he returned, Maíno did not only make a mimetic transposition of figurative models that he'd seen but was able to reinterpret these sources with a refreshing impetus. This phenomenon of importing the new via traveling artistic style is what differentiates his works from those of his contemporaries.

The painting The Conversion of Saint Paul was acquired by the former Museum of Art of Catalonia in 1952. It immediately sparked the interest of John Ainaud Lasarte (1919–1995), at that time the director of General Art Museums in Barcelona. Ainaud initially considered the possibility that the creator of the work was Italian, possibly Orazio Gentileschi, but ultimately the painting was attributed to the Valencian painter José Vergara. However, subsequent research and the creation of a detailed profile of the artist has attributed it to Maíno. This new attribution is an important contribution to the catalog of the artist and key to understanding Spanish painting of the seventeenth century.

An accidental fire in 1985 severely damaged the painting.

== Style ==
In this work, the artist's skills are demonstrated through the vigorous drawing and meticulous strokes on the edges as well as the sculptural depiction of the figures which is established by using light, contrasting and intense color. The Conversion of Saint Paul shows the debt owed by Maíno towards Italian painting and the artistic stimulation he found in Rome, where he lived between 1605 and 1610.

The painting also suggests the influence of Caravaggio, especially visible in the modeling of hair, the appearance of the angels, and the stern face of Jesus. The latter shows great stylistic similarities with the principal figure on the canvas of the Trinity (1612–1620), part of the altarpiece Maíno created for the convent of Our Lady of the Conception in his hometown of Pastrana.

== Restoration ==
In addition to being altered and repainted, The Conversion of Saint Paul was in a serious state of degradation due to a fire that occurred on 1 April 1985 in the municipal offices of Barcelona where it was exhibited. During the incident, the work was subjected to high temperatures which caused bubbles to form, resulting in significant losses. The painting was also covered by a dark layer, which complicated its recovery. Analytical techniques were used to understand the composition, drawing, and color, and to make a thorough diagnosis of its condition.

Radiographic examination was used to establish the appearance of the painting before intervention. It showed a vigorous drawing with marked contrasts of light and shadow, allowing an appreciation of the artist and his work. It also identified areas of polychrome wear.

The painting had undergone a significant change of format, being cut vertically on the right side, with the addition of a painted canvas strip of 7.5 centimetres (3 in). This piece originally belonged to the top of the canvas, which had also been previously cut. This alteration would have been carried out before the painting's admission to the museum in 1952, as it appears in old photographs of the museum. This operation was dated by a section of newspaper that appeared when the painting was unframed; this fragment contained no name or publication date, but after investigation was identified as a page of the newspaper La Prensa from 15 May 1945.

Given the fragility of the canvas, it was decided to change the frame to a size consistent with the original artwork, with the aim of preserving unharmed what remained of the already considerably mutilated painting.

The restoration process also gave the opportunity to analyze the materials and to characterize the techniques used by the painter. The colors of the paint and how it was applied to achieve the shades and light effects, as well as the chemical composition of the earth-based pigments were studied. These were determined to match those of other works by Maíno analyzed in the laboratory of the Museo del Prado for the exhibition dedicated to Maíno in 2009–2010.

== Sources ==
- Quilez, Francesc i Mestre, Mireia La conversió de sant Pau. Atribució i restauració. La recuperació d’una pintura per al MNAC MNAC, July 2012. ISBN 978-84-8043-254-2
- Leticia Ruiz Gómez (ed.), Juan Bautista Maíno, Museo Nacional del Prado/Ediciones El Viso (2009), ISBN 978-84-8480-190-0
