= Convento de Santo Tomás (Madrid) =

Set of buildings in Madrid, Spain

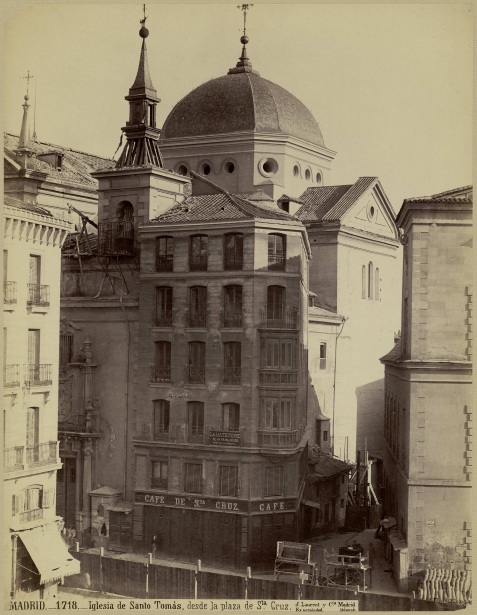
View from Plaza de Santa Cruz, by J. Laurent (c. 1870.); Biblioteca Nacional de España. Also shows the Café de Santa Cruz, a café established on the ground floor of the convent.

The defunct Convento de Santo Tomás (also called Colegio de Atocha) was a set of buildings belonging to the Dominicans, under the patronage of St. Thomas Aquinas, in Madrid.

It was located in the former Arrabal de Santa Cruz, showing its main facade to the Calle de Atocha. Its exact location is close to the current Plaza de Santa Cruz, occupying part of the site of the current Church of la Santa Cruz.

It was erected in the mid-17th century, being a good example of Spanish Baroque architecture. The convent had annex a cabinet for the teaching of theology, philosophy and rhetoric (College of Santo Tomás), initially dependent of the Dominicans of Basílica de Nuestra Señora de Atocha. The set consisted of a monastery that served as school functions, a courtyard and a large church.

In 1836 during the Spanish confiscation church and convent were secularized and confiscated, going to have many uses, from administrative center to Milicia Nacional headquarters. Three years after suffering a strong fire the complex entirely disappeared, which occurred in 1872. The early iglesia de la Santa Cruz, built in 16th century (1583), attached to the Convento de Santo Tomas, also was affected by the fire.

== History ==
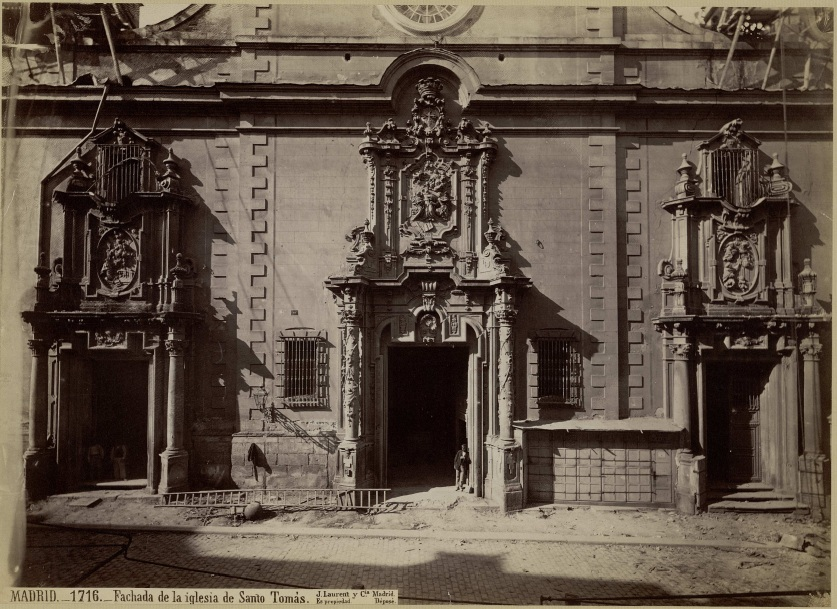
Photograph of the facade of the church, J. Laurent (c. 1870.); National Library of Spain.

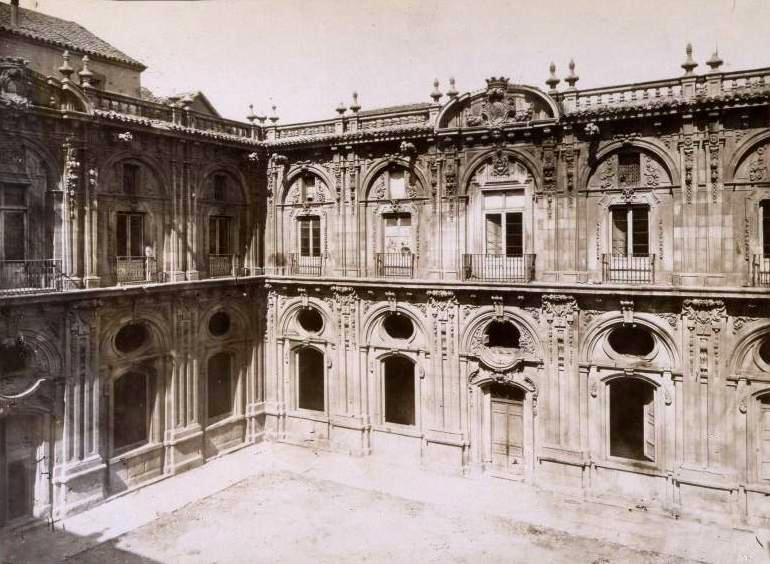
Cloister of the Convento de Santo Tomás (c. 1875).

The Dominican friars from the convento de Nuestra Señora de Atocha founded in 1563 a school of theology with money obtained from the sale of a house that had been donated to them, both far from the urban core of the time. In 1583, at request of Friar Diego de Chaves (Philip II's confessor), it is excised as independent priory. The Count-Duke of Olivares took the new monastery under his protection. In 1635 begins to build the building in Arrabal de Santa Cruz and the works lasted until 1656.

The church's facade and dome, both among the most outstanding works of Spanish courtly Baroque, were made by the José de Churriguera's sons: Jerónimo and Nicolás. The church's facade was monumental, distributed the access to the temple in three portals, features of the ornate style of the Churriguera family. The cour d'honneur, two-story, made by José Jiménez Donoso, was considered one of the best architectural works of the 17th century in Madrid. The church was heavily used by many Madrilenian co-fraternities. The Chapel of Santo Domingo in Soriano was well known, owned by Fernando de Fonseca Ruiz de Contreras, Marquis of la Lapilla. In the year 1726 the dome collapsed, killing about 80 people.

Several Dominicans died during the anticlerical riots of 1834. The convent building had several uses: it was meeting place for the Landaburian Society; was conditioned to be one of the first headquarters of the Ateneo, prison and barracks for the Milicia Nacional with modifications made by architect Juan Pedro Ayegui. At beginning of 19th century, was settled in the corner of the buildings set the Café de Santa Cruz. On April 13, 1872 a fire severely damaged its structures. Four years later, the building collapsed, and as result, was completely demolished.

From what was once a Madrilenian religious and cultural institution only remaining a few works of its movable heritage: the excellent painting Santo Domingo en Soriano work by Antonio de Pereda which adorned the Chapel of the Marquis of la Lapilla, preserved in Museo Cerralbo, the Assumption of the Virgin, altar large painting painted by Francisco Ignacio Ruiz de la Iglesia for the Chapel of Nuestra Señora de las Nieves along with the Coronation of the Virgin now are in the Parish church del Corpus Christi in Seville and the sculpture of Our Lady of the Rosary flagship work of Luis Salvador Carmona, venerated in the Oratorio del Olivar.
