= The Conversion of Saint Paul (Murillo) =

Painting by Bartolomé Esteban Murillo

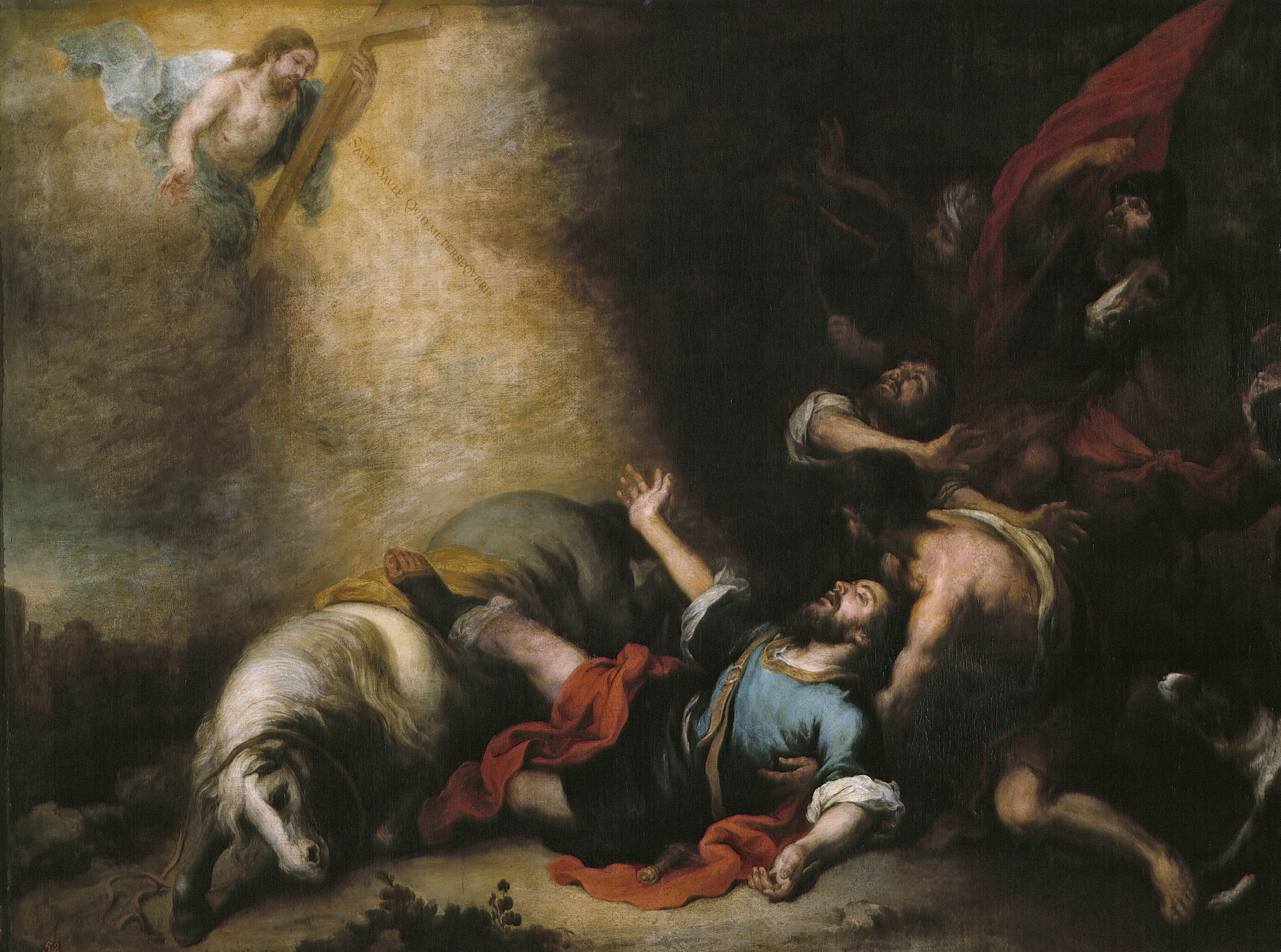

The Conversion of Saint Paul is a c.1675-1680 oil on canvas painting by Bartolomé Esteban Murillo, acquired by Charles IV of Spain and now in the Prado Museum in Madrid.

== Description ==
The meaning of the painting was influenced by a truly baroque play of light and shadow. Half of the picture is the vision Saul of Tarsus got. The Risen One with a cross was shown in bright colors, asking the fallen one: Saul, Saul, why are you persecuting me? (the artist wrote these words from the Acts of the Apostles on a canvas in Latin - Saule, Saule, quid me persequeris). The second half of the work is dark. What we manage to see we see thanks to the light emanating from the Appearance. The future Apostle lies on the ground, supported by one of the companions of the wicked journey. One leg was pinned down by an overturned horse, he was unable to pull his foot out of the stirrup, so sudden was what he is still experiencing. The traveling companions are also terrified; according to the biblical description, they only hear the voice but see nothing. Only animals seem to recognize the Creator: Saul's horse as if bowing before Christ. In the lower right corner, the artist placed a faintly visible dog. In the distance you can see the outline of the city to which the newcomers were heading. Damascus will receive Saul changed.
