= The Conversion of Saint Paul (Rubens, Berlin) =

Painting by Peter Paul Rubens

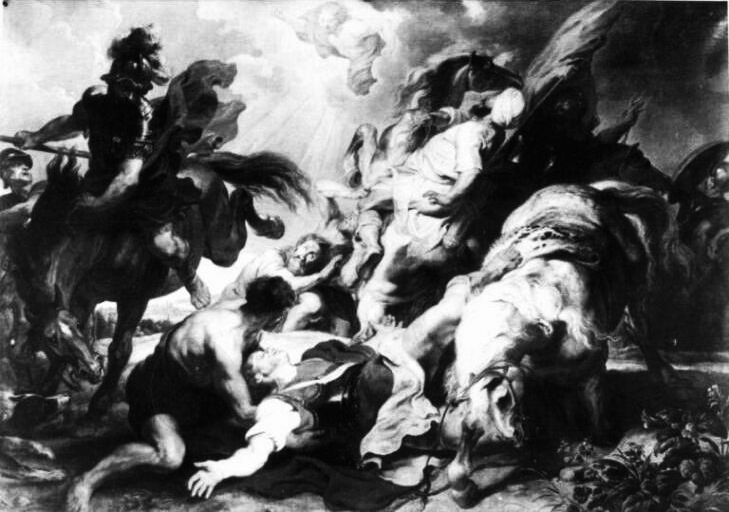
The Conversion of Saint Paul by Rubens

The Conversion of Saint Paul is a 1620s painting by Peter Paul Rubens, now missing or lost. It showed the conversion of Paul the Apostle.

== History ==
It was produced for Władysław Vasa of Poland. The Flemish engraver Gerard Edelinck (1640–1707), who lived in Paris, records that he was assured in Antwerp that "The Lion Hunt, for example, and the Fall of St Paul were made for the King of Poland It was transferred to John II Casimir in Paris in 1669, before being bought by the Montesquieu family in 1673. It remained in France for over a century (being acquired by Nicolas de Lamoignon in 1724), until it was bought by G Harris in 1819. It was bought from him in 1903 by the Gemäldegalerie, Berlin.

The painting was moved to the Flakturm Friedrichshain (an anti-aircraft tower) in Berlin for safety with the rest of the museum's collection around 1942 and was lost or destroyed some time between March and May 1945. Between 11 March and 2 May 1945 all but 434 paintings were evacuated from the tower to former salt mines in Thuringia. The tower was surrendered to the Red Army on 2 May and its museum guards sent home. They returned on 4 and 5 May, finding one of the floors broken. On 6 May another floor burned out, with heat and smoke preventing entry, and between 14 and 18 May 1945 the whole tower was destroyed by fire.
