= Convento de San Pedro Mártir =

Convent in Toledo, Spain

Coordinates: 39.8581°N 4.0275°W

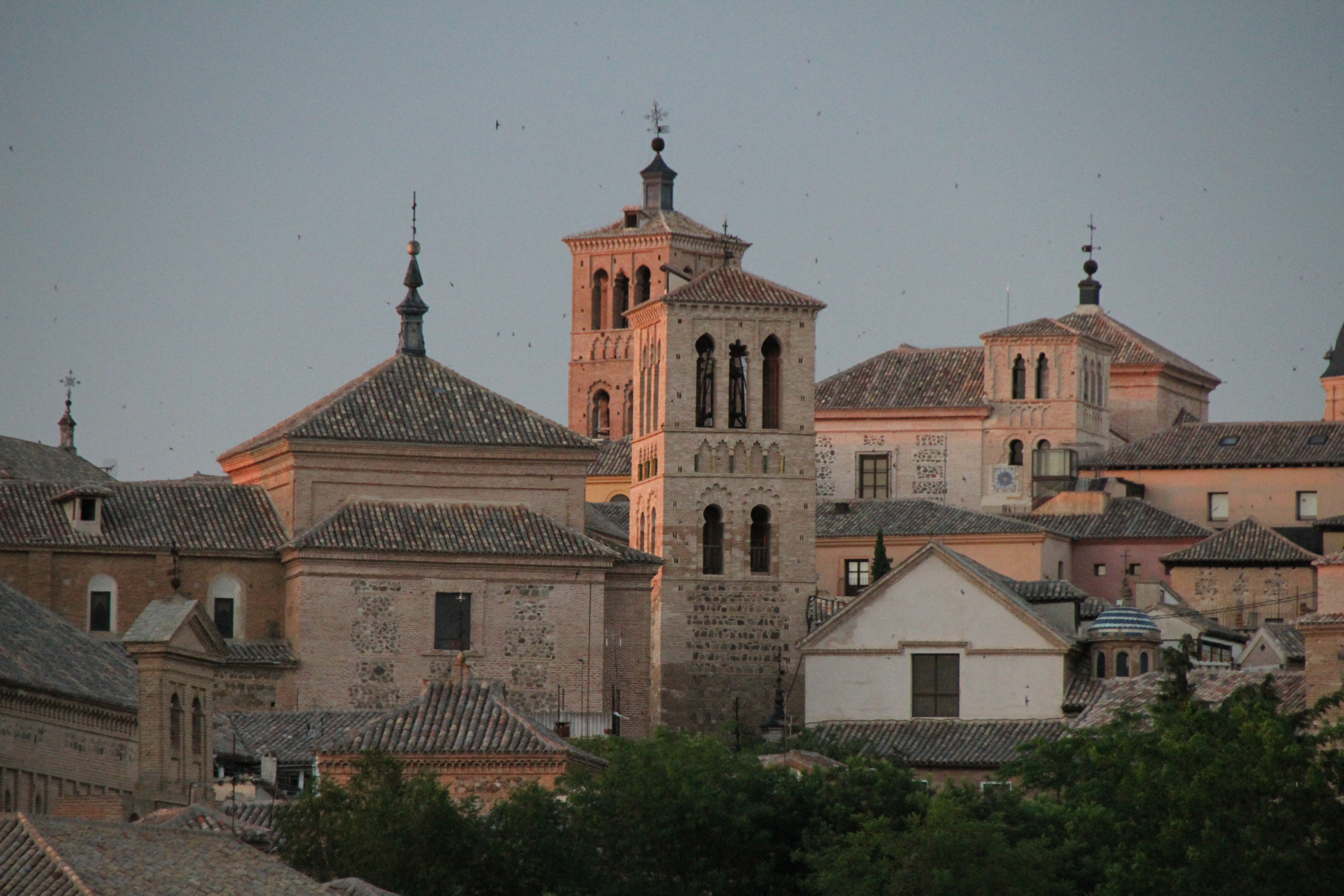
Convento de San Pedro Mártir

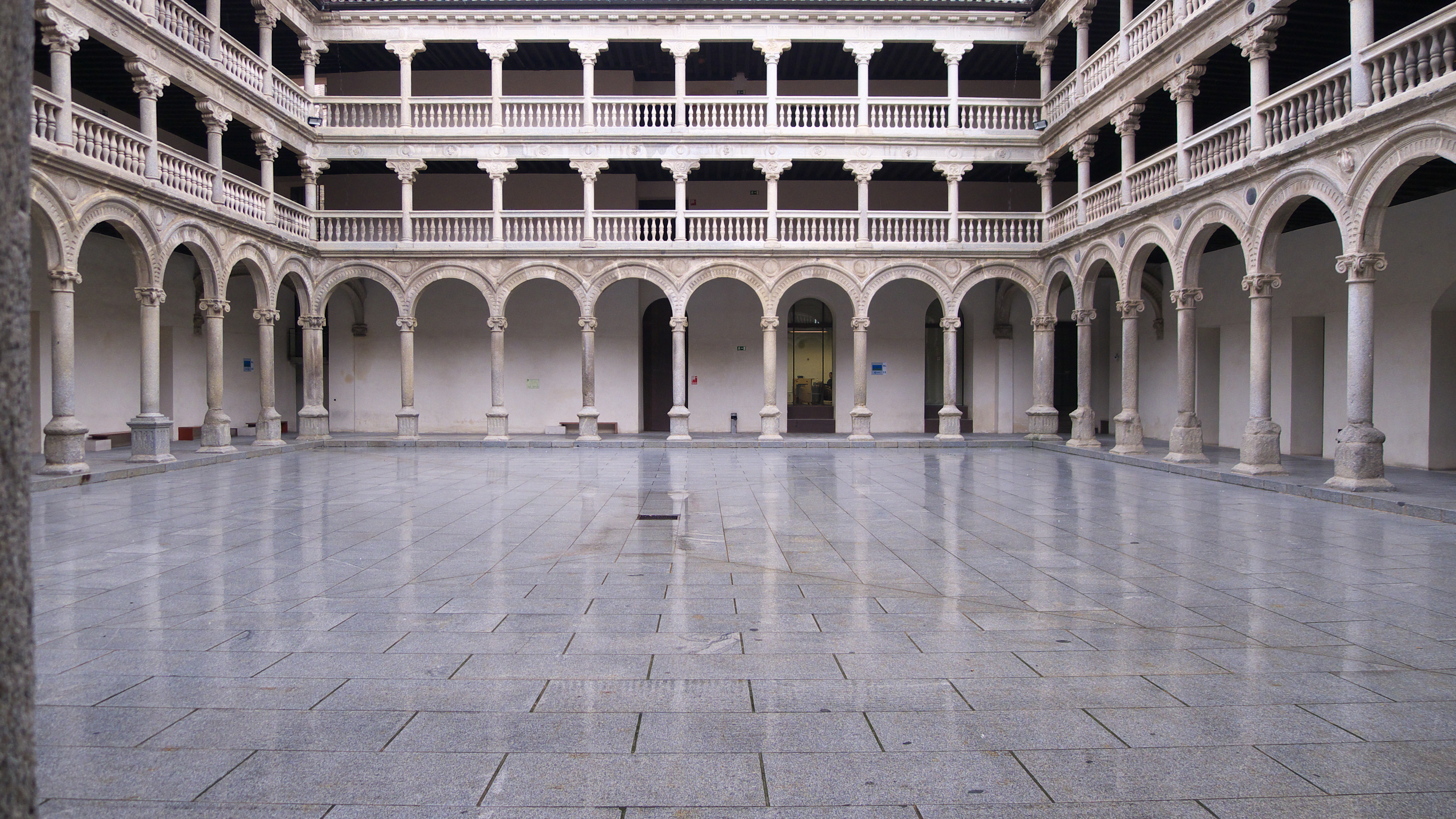
Cloister of the old convent.

The Convento de San Pedro Mártir (English: Convent of Saint Peter Martyr) is a convent located in Toledo, Spain. The Dominican convent was moved in 1407 from its location outside the walls to the houses donated by Doña Guiomar de Meneses. Through its successive extensions and modifications, it became one of the richest and most important convents in the city.

The convent, of enormous dimensions, is organized around three courtyards: the one closest to the entrance is called Real; the smallest is called the Silencio, and the one called Naranjos or the Procesiones is located on the side of the epistle of the church.

== History and description ==
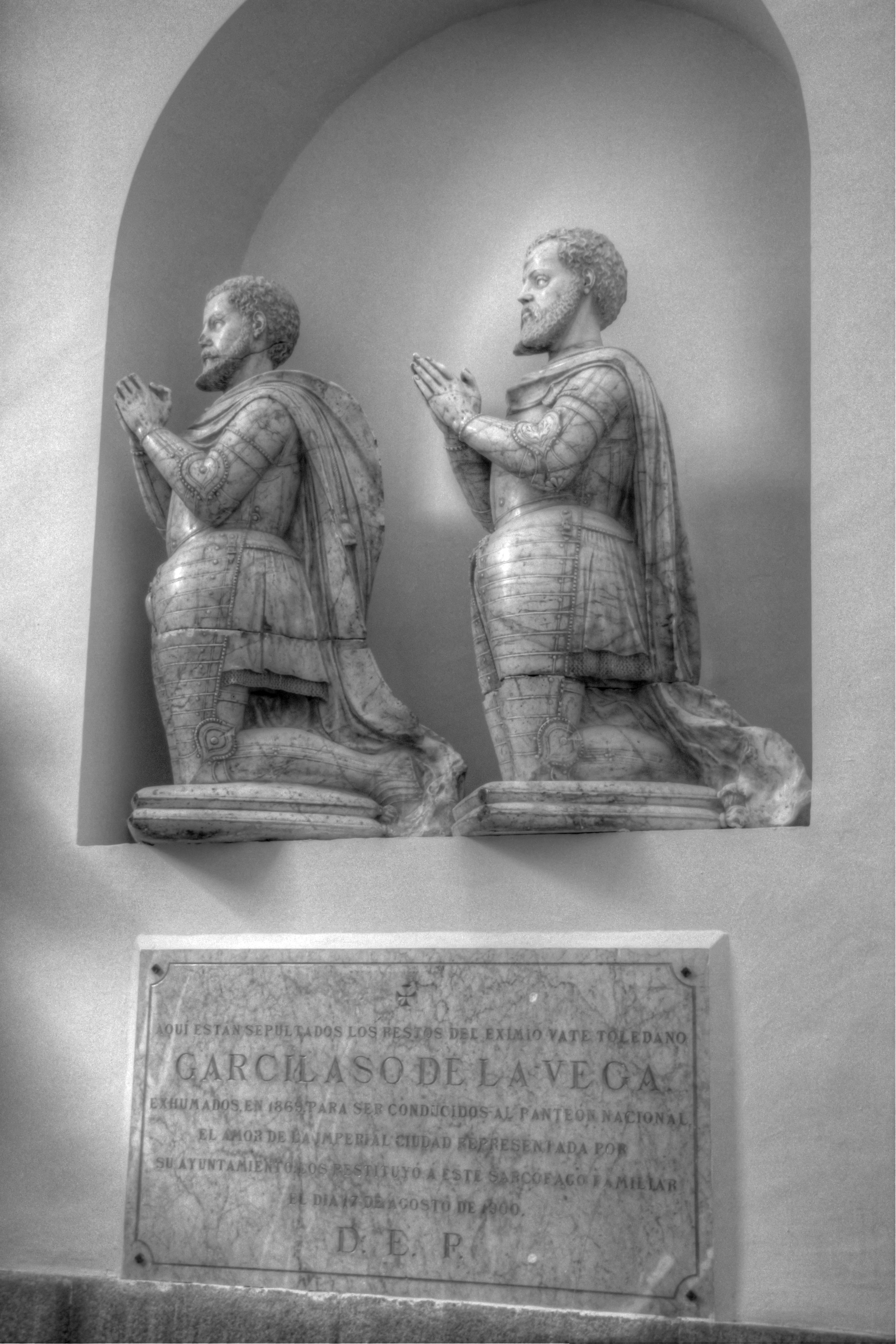
Tomb of Garcilaso de la Vega

The cloister called Silencio is the oldest of all and possibly corresponds to a civil construction that was later encompassed in the convent. It has three floors. The low has semicircular arches that rest on columns. Pointed arches appear in the north stretch. Columns and capitals of marble, of great bill, point to an Italian origin. The second floor is formed by recessed arches that lean on columns very similar to the lower ones.

The cloister of the Silencio contrasts with the Real, of much greater size, that began to build with traces of Covarrubias, in 1541, by his disciple Hernán González de Lara. It consists of three floors entirely built of stone. The low floor is composed of semicircular arches that rest on columns. The architectural elements used-slate mirrors in the wainscots, balusters, etc., are the usual in Covarrubias in other works of the moment.

Of these same dates is the door that gives access to the convent from the street of San Pedro Mártir, that formerly was the main entrance.

The cloister of the Naranjos, also called the Procesiones, underwent a complete transformation in the middle of the 18th century and has reached us with a first floor of arches recessed on columns.

Nicolás de Vergara el Mozo was in charge of carrying out the works of the new church and the sacristy. This one began to be constructed in 1587 and it is composed of two spaces: the greater, rectangular, especially serves as sacristy, and another, square, houses a small chapel. The walls of the two spaces are formed by arches with niches, which achieves a greater unity between both. Among the arches are erected Doric pilasters with their corresponding entablature running, which also serves as an element of union between the two spaces.

The larger space is covered with a flat, fluted, vaulted ceiling with lunettes.

The most direct access from the church to the sacristy is through a door located at one end of the major side. There is the chapel of Santa Inés, whose Gothic architecture, with vaulted edges, contains several interesting sepulchers (or tombs).

The works of the present church began in 1605 with traces and conditions of Nicolás de Vergara el Mozo. Two years later, Vergara died, and Juan Bautista Monegro took over the work.

Its plant is of three naves, with choir in high and flat presbytery, with two side chapels. The naves are separated by three arches with Doric pilasters that support the entablature, on top of which a barrel vault rises. A beautiful fence of beginnings of the 17th century separates the presbytery from the transept.

The exterior door of the church, Monegro's work, highlights the magnificent Mudéjar tower of the neighboring church of San Román.

Treated in stone, it contrasts not only with the tower but also with the masonry wall of the church proper. The design of the cover reveals the activity of Monegro as a tableau maker and his relations with Herrerian architecture. The main theme is the triumphal arch that develops in his lower body. The upper one is formed by a small temple, with the sculpture of the titular saint on a basement running. On top of this, two pyramids are also raised with a ball. In the upper part of the facade there are two windows of very simple trace that serve to illuminate the entrance hall.

== Headquarters ==
In the years 1992-1993 important works of remodeling and integration of the convent were realized within the new structures of the University of Castilla-La Mancha, exposing parts of the subsoil of the primitive constructions. it has been operating as the university headquarters of the Faculty of Juridical and Social Sciences of Toledo.
