= José Antolínez =

Spanish painter

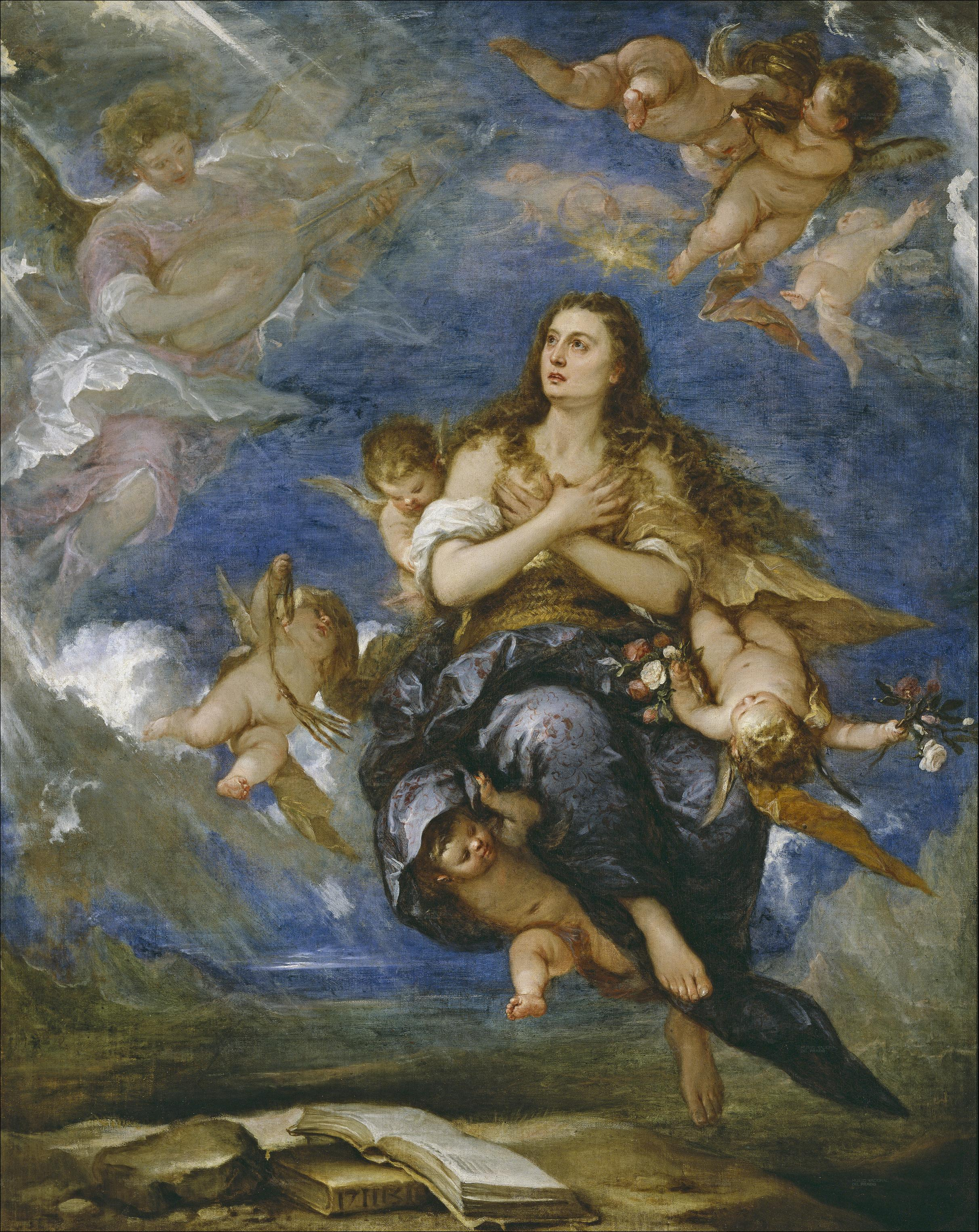
Tránsito de la Magdalena (c. 1672)

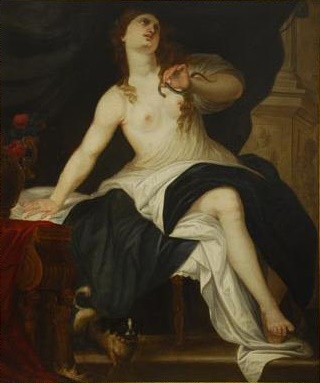
Suicide of Cleopatra, oil on canvas, 137.5 cm x 115.5 cm, private collection.

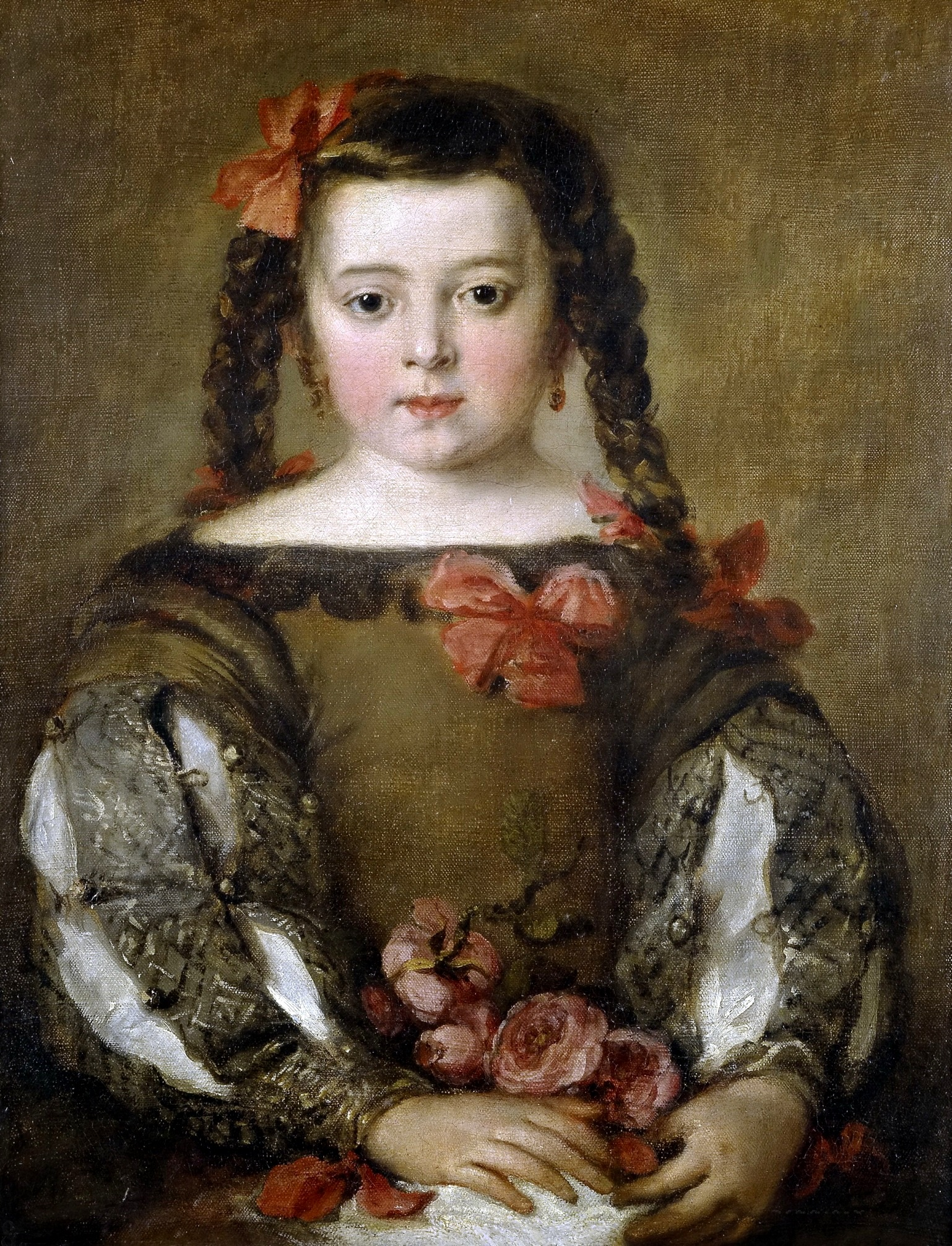
Portrait of a Child, oil on canvas (58 x 46 cm), Museo del Prado, Madrid

José Claudio Antolinez (1635 – 30 May 1675) was a Spanish painter of the Baroque period.

== Career and personality ==
Antolinez was born and died in Madrid. He received his early training at the studio of Francisco Rizi.

His "haughty character and sarcastic personality gained him many enemies among his contemporaries". Some note he played maddening jokes on his colleagues Claudio Coello and Cabezalero as well as Francisco Rizi, whom he called painter of wall ornaments, in allusion to the latter's decoration of the hall of comedies in the Palace of Buen Retiro; but also impelled likely by his jealousy at lacking the same skill. Antolinez also painted religious paintings.

== Works ==
=== Paintings ===
- Saint Sebastian
- Pintor Pobre
- A Child (Una niña), oil on panel (58 x 46 cm), Museo del Prado, Madrid
- Huertos Olivos
- Adoration of the Magi (around the 1660s)
- Death of Lucretia (Muerte de Lucrecia) (1663), Alcalá Subastas, now belongs to the Comyn collection in Barcelona since May 2007
- Immaculate (around 1665), Museo de Bellas Artes de Bilbao.
- Annunciation (between 1665 and 1675)
- Immaculate Conception (La Inmaculada Concepción) (1666), oil on panel 207 x 167 cm, Museo Lázaro Galdiano, Madrid
- Bacanal con niños (around 1670), oil on panel, 90 x 136 cm, Museo de Bellas Artes de Córdoba
- Éxtasis de la Magdalena (around 1670), National Art Museum of Romania, Bucharest
- Inmaculada (around 1670), oil on panel, 213 x 70 cm, Ashmolean Museum, University of Oxford.
- Saint Rose of Lima (around 1670), oil on panel, 306 x 150 8, Museum of Fine Arts, Budapest
- Suicide of Cleopatra, oil on panel, 137.5 x 115.5 cm, now at the Comyn collection in Barcelona since May 2007
- Assumption of Saint Mary
- Holy Family
- Portrait of a Man
- The Liberation of St. Peter, oil on canvas, currently in the National Gallery of Ireland, Dublin.

=== Other ===
- San Jerónimo Chapel, Jaén Cathedral
