= The Communion of Saint Teresa =

1670 painting by Juan Martín Cabezalero

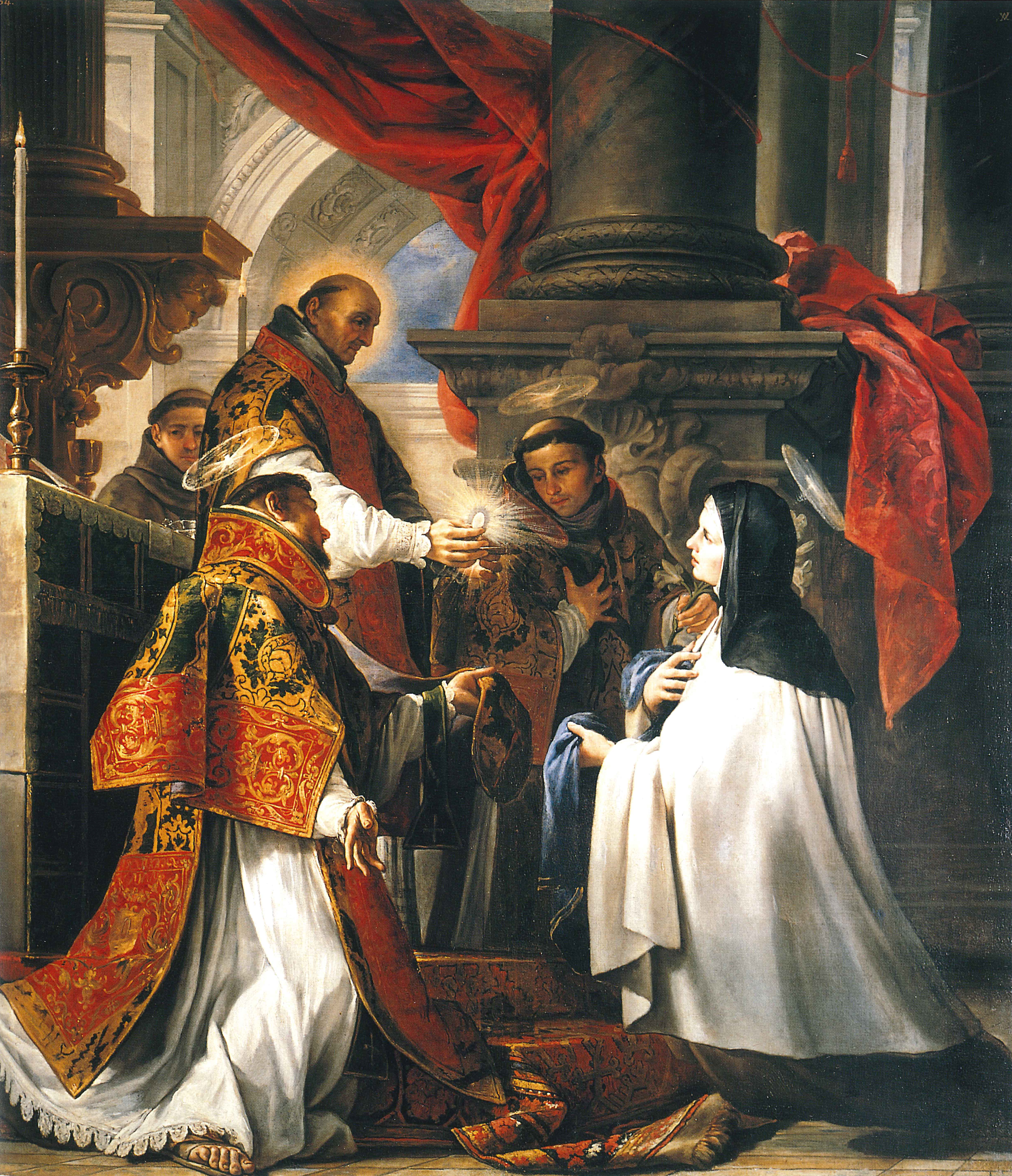

The Communion of Saint Teresa is a 1670 oil on canvas painting by Juan Martín Cabezalero, now in the Museo Lázaro Galdiano in Madrid.

== History ==
Produced three years before the artist's death, the painting shows a story from Friar Antonio de la Huerta's Historia y admirable vida del glorioso Padre San Pedro de Alcántara (1669) telling of Teresa of Avila attending a mass officiated by Peter of Alcántara, during which she had a vision of saints Francis of Assisi and Anthony of Padua assisting as deacon and subdeacon respectively. Who commissioned it is unknown, but the subject suggests it may have been a Carmelite or Franciscan monastery.

The first document to record it is an inventory of the belongings of doña Ana María de Sora, a wife of a major official in Philip V's court who died in Madrid in 1743. That document refers to it as being in a "smooth gilded frame" and measuring "three varas high by more than varas wide" (matching the present work) and calls it "an original by Cabezalero, a painting of Saint Peter of Alcántara giving communion to Saint Teresa, with Saint Francis and Saint Anthony serving as deacon and subdeacon".

Over time it passed through the collections of the marquis of San Nicolás, the marquis of la Ensenada and Infante Luis. It later belonged to the marquis of Salamanca who sold it in 1875. By then it had been misattributed to Claudio Coello, an attribution which held until very recently. José Lázaro Galdiano bought it at an unknown date and left it to the Spanish state on his death in 1947 with the rest of his major collection.

== Analysis ==
Juan Antonio Gaya Nuño has called the work "one of the most emotive paintings of the Baroque, considerably more than the much-celebrated Communion of Saint Jerome by Domenichino». Enrique Lafuente Ferrari called it an "impressive painting evoking the memory of Zurbarán by its severe religiosity and of Cano by its serene and harmonious beauty". Alfonso E. Pérez Sánchez, former director del Museo del Prado, called it a "singular masterpiece" and "one of the most spectacular compositions of the Madrid Baroque". Sánchez also argued that - since the earliest biographers of Coello did not mention it - it could not be his work, stating that "the beauty of its colours has always been emphasised, with intense and very well coordinated reds and blues and brilliant touches of gold and silver that give the composition a feeling of opulence but still maintains a serene, devout restraint".

An X-ray of the work prior to a restoration project shows the changes Cabezalero made during the painting process, all aimed at making the composition more solemn and monumental. He removed a number of cherubs at the top and modified Teresa's position, Saint Peter's head and the position of Saint Francis's hands. The work evokes Peter Paul Rubens and the Venetian school, especially Paolo Veronese. The corbel over the altar, the column in the background and the red curtain tucked behind it create a rich Baroque 'stage-set', emphasised by the figures' gestures, solemnity and almost sculptural monumentality and the luxurious dalmatic worn by St. Francis. In Sánchez's opinion, the construction of the characters, "resolved in large planes with very pronounced profiles, making use of the contrasts of dark against light and light on dark, and the peculiar range of colours, which emphasizes the effects of white and blue" all argue for the work being by Cabezalero.

The artist chooses the precise moment Teresa receives communion to make the work not only a depiction of a vision but also an exaltation of the eucharist. She is also shown levitating, a fact which had been barely noticeable before the restoration.

== Preparatory drawing ==
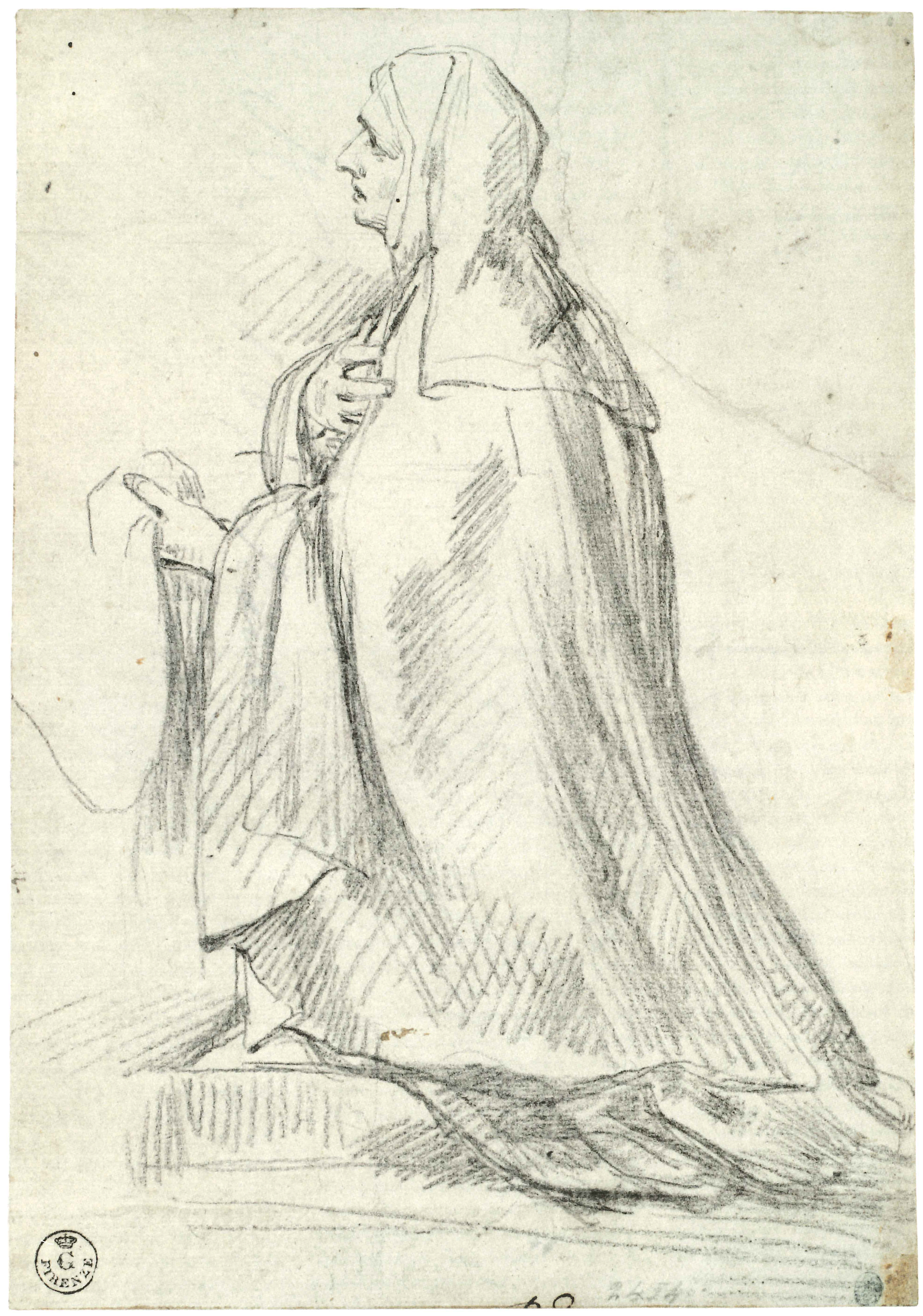
Preparatory Study for 'The Communion of Saint Teresa' , c. 1670, black pencil on laid paper, 254 x 179 mm, Prints and Drawings Cabinet (donated by Emilio Santarelli), Uffizi, Florence (catalogue number 2454 S)

A preparatory drawing of Saint Teresa for the work survives at the Uffizi in Florence, practically identical to the saint in the finished work, with the only differences being the cloth she carries in her left hand and the position of her head, which in the painting is turned slightly to look at the Host. Comparing the painting, the X-ray of it and the drawing shows the artist's changes and hesitations before reaching the finished version.

The drawing also shows Cabezalero following the Madrid tradition of drawing in black pencil, which had become highly developed since the time of Vicente Carducho (c. 1576-1638). The figure's intense profile and the shading based on parallel and crossed strokes Cabezalero continuing the practice of Francisco Rizi or of Carreño - he was a pupil of the latter, joining his workshop and living in his house until at least 1666. The drawing clearly reveals the artist's sources and how he developed them, thus acting as more evidence for his painting the work.

== Bibliography (in Spanish) ==
- (in Spanish) Navarrete Prieto, Benito; Alonso Moral, Roberto (2016). I segni nel tempo : dibujos españoles de los Uffizi. Madrid: Fundación Mapfre. OCLC 953016891.
- (in Spanish) Pérez Sánchez, Alfonso E.; Museo Lázaro Galdiano (2005). Pintura española de los siglos XVII y XVIII en la Fundación Lázaro Galdiano. Catálogos de la Fundación Lázaro Galdiano, 9. Madrid: Fundación Lázaro Galdiano. OCLC 1063423687.
