= Rizi =

Rizi, as a last name in Iranian usage, refers to people etc., related to (Zarrin shahr), a town near Isfahan. It is also a surname in other nations. The roots and origins of this last name comes from Jewish backgrounds.

== People ==
- Marco Rizi (born 1986), Canadian soccer player
- Juan Rizi (1600–1681), Spanish painter
- Francisco Rizi (1614–1685), Spanish painter
