= Mateo Cerezo =

Spanish artist (1637–1666)

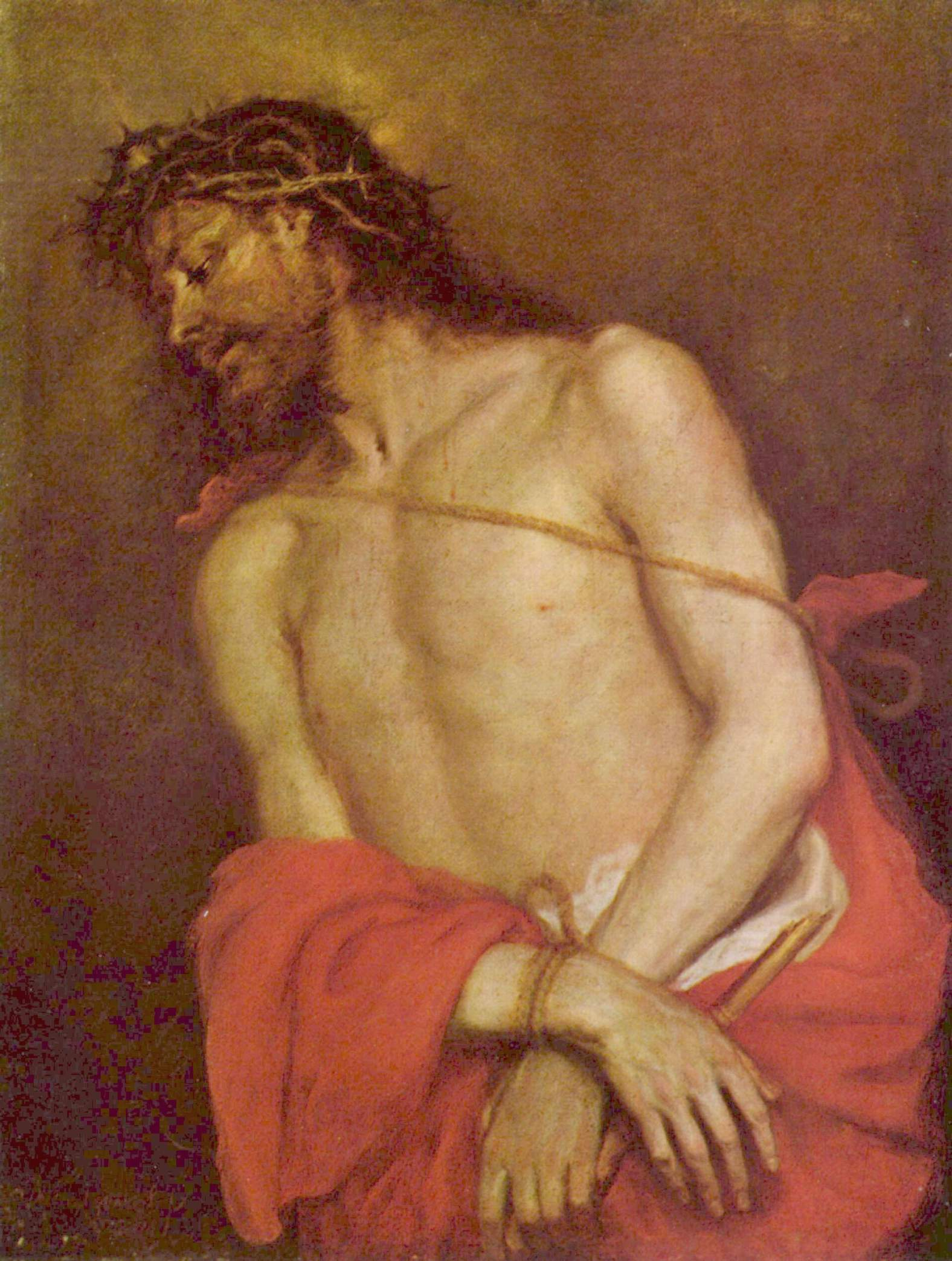
Ecce Homo, 1650

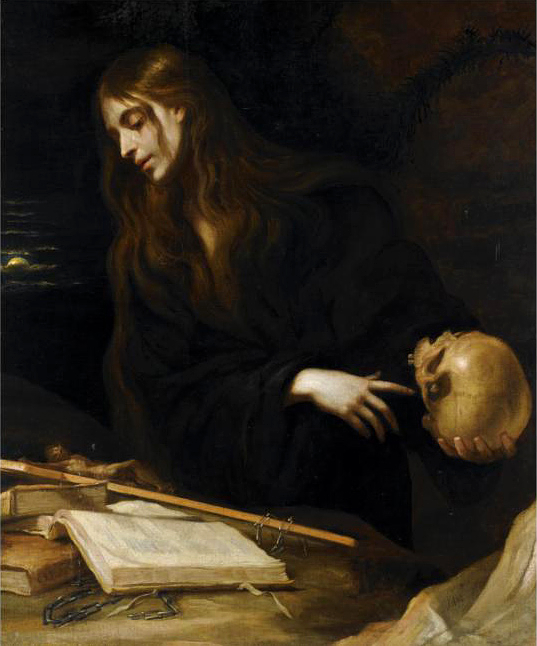
Mary Magdalene

Mateo Cerezo, sometimes referred to as Mateo Cerezo the younger, (19 April 1637, Burgos – 29 June 1666, Madrid) was a Spanish Baroque painter, known primarily for religious works and still-lifes.

== Life and works ==
His father was the painter Mateo Cerezo Muñoz (c. 1610–1670), sometimes referred to as "Mateo Cerezo the elder"), and Isabel Delgado, the daughter of a well-known goldsmith.

After receiving his initial training from his father, Cerezo went to Madrid where he studied with Juan Carreño de Miranda, becoming one his most promising students. He was also employed in Carreño's workshops.

His style was influenced by Antonio de Pereda, Carreño and Bartolomé Esteban Murillo. He also appears to have been familiar with Titian, Veronese and Correggio, whose works he could have seen in the Royal collections. He was active in Burgos, Valladolid and Valencia, as well as Madrid. His works ranged from altarpieces to small devotional paintings.

His final work was a "Last Supper" for the refectory of the Order of Augustinian Recollects, which is known only from a print by José del Castillo, made in 1778. It was looted during the Peninsular War, and passed through several hands before disappearing during the Spanish Civil War.

He was married in 1664; he died two years later as the result of an unspecified serious illness. Despite his early death, he left a relatively large body of works, many of which may be seen at the Museo del Prado.

== Selected works ==
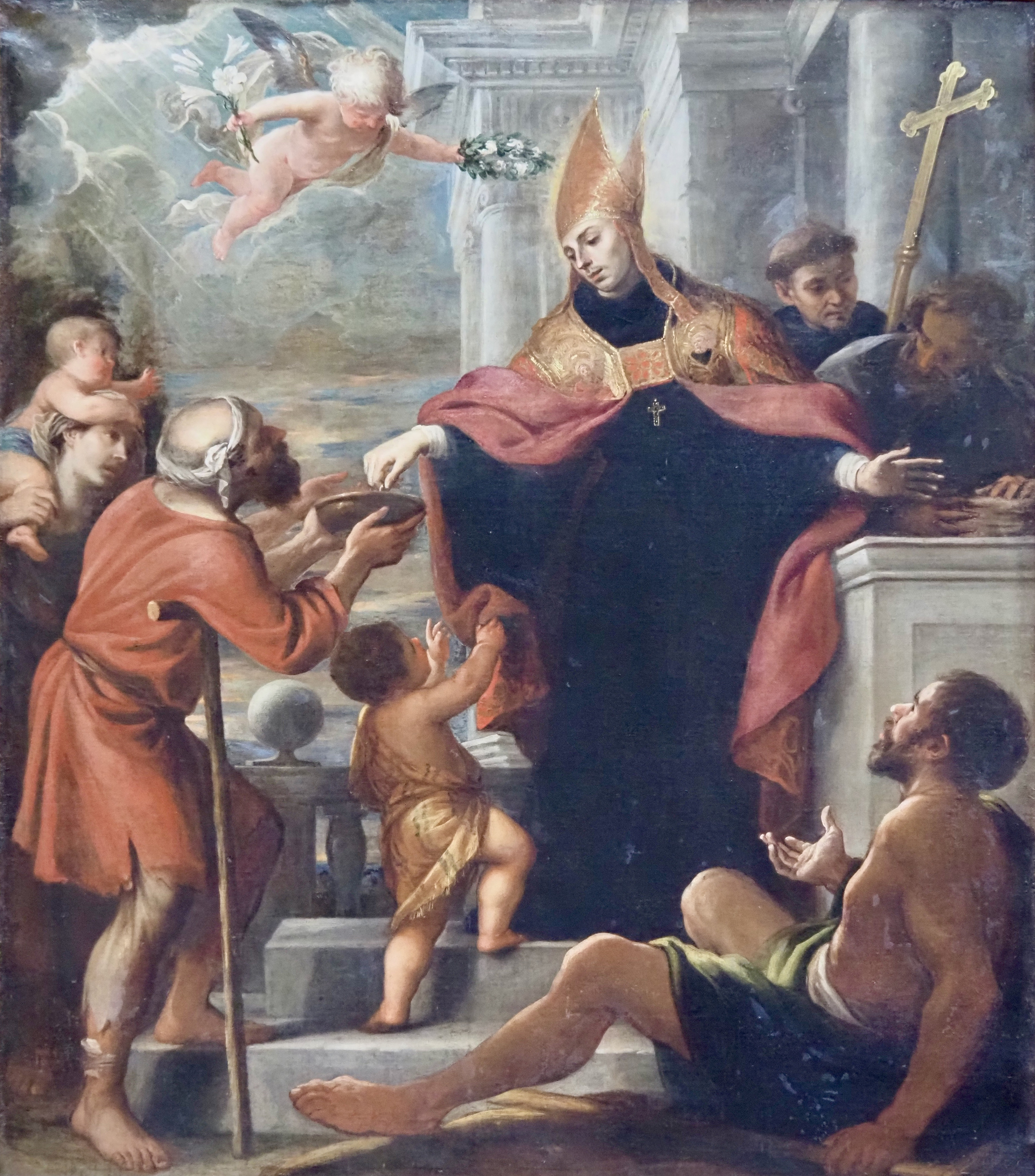
Saint Thomas of Villanova Giving Alms

- Ecce Homo, 1650, Museum of Fine Arts, Budapest.
- Assumption of Mary (Asunción de María), c. 1650, Museo del Prado, Madrid.
- Desposorios místicos de Santa Catalina, Palencia Cathedral.
- The Assumption of Our Lady (La Asunción de Nuestra Señora), San Telmo Museoa, San Sebastián
- Magdalena penitente, c.1661, Rijksmuseum, Ámsterdam.
- Saint Francis Receiving the Stigmata, 1663, Chazen Museum of Art, Madison, WI
- Boda mística de Santa Catalina. Museo del Prado, Madrid.
- Bodegón de cocina. Museo del Prado, Madrid
- Una pobre alma ante el tribunal, Museo del Prado, Madrid.

== Gallery ==
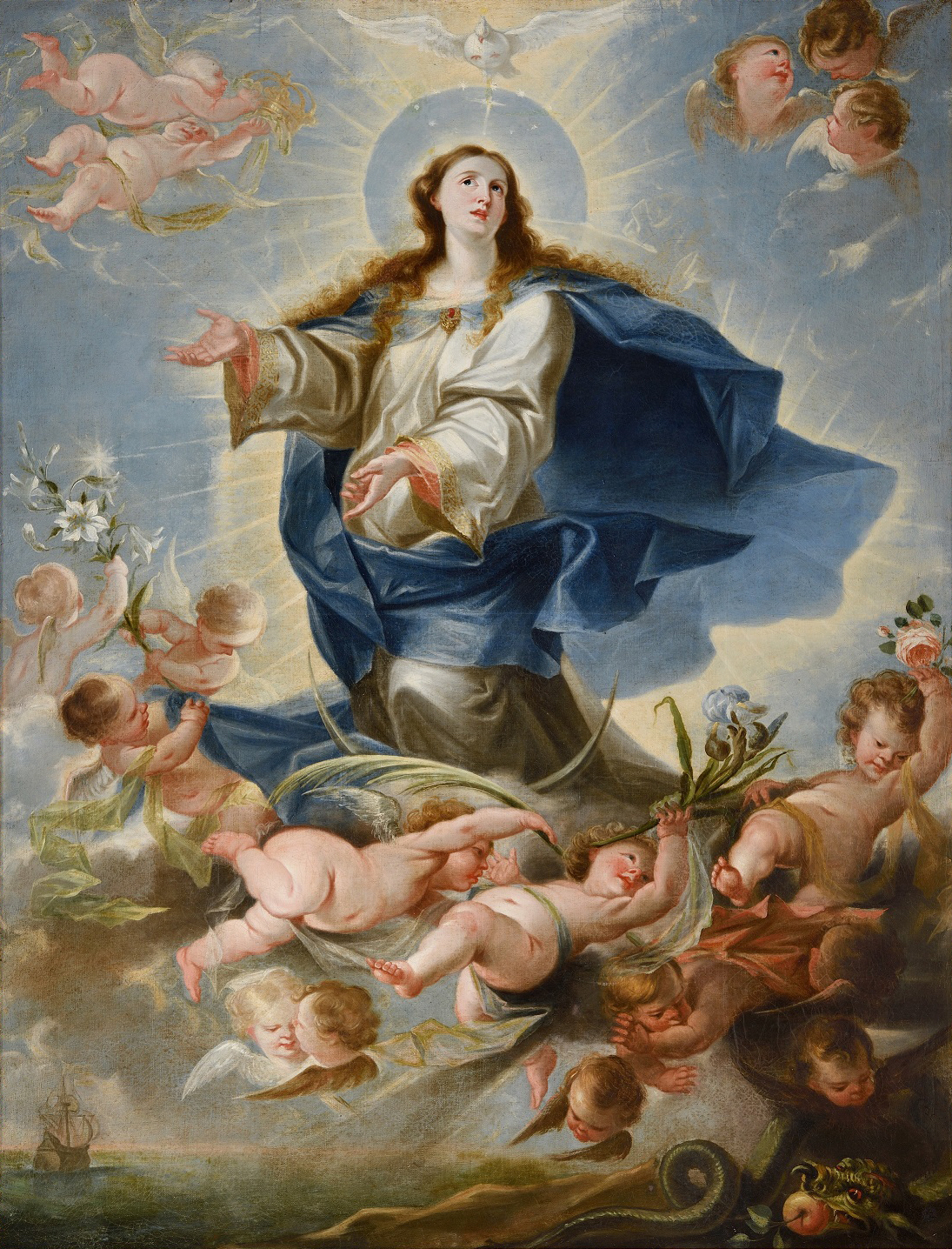
The Assumption of the Virgin

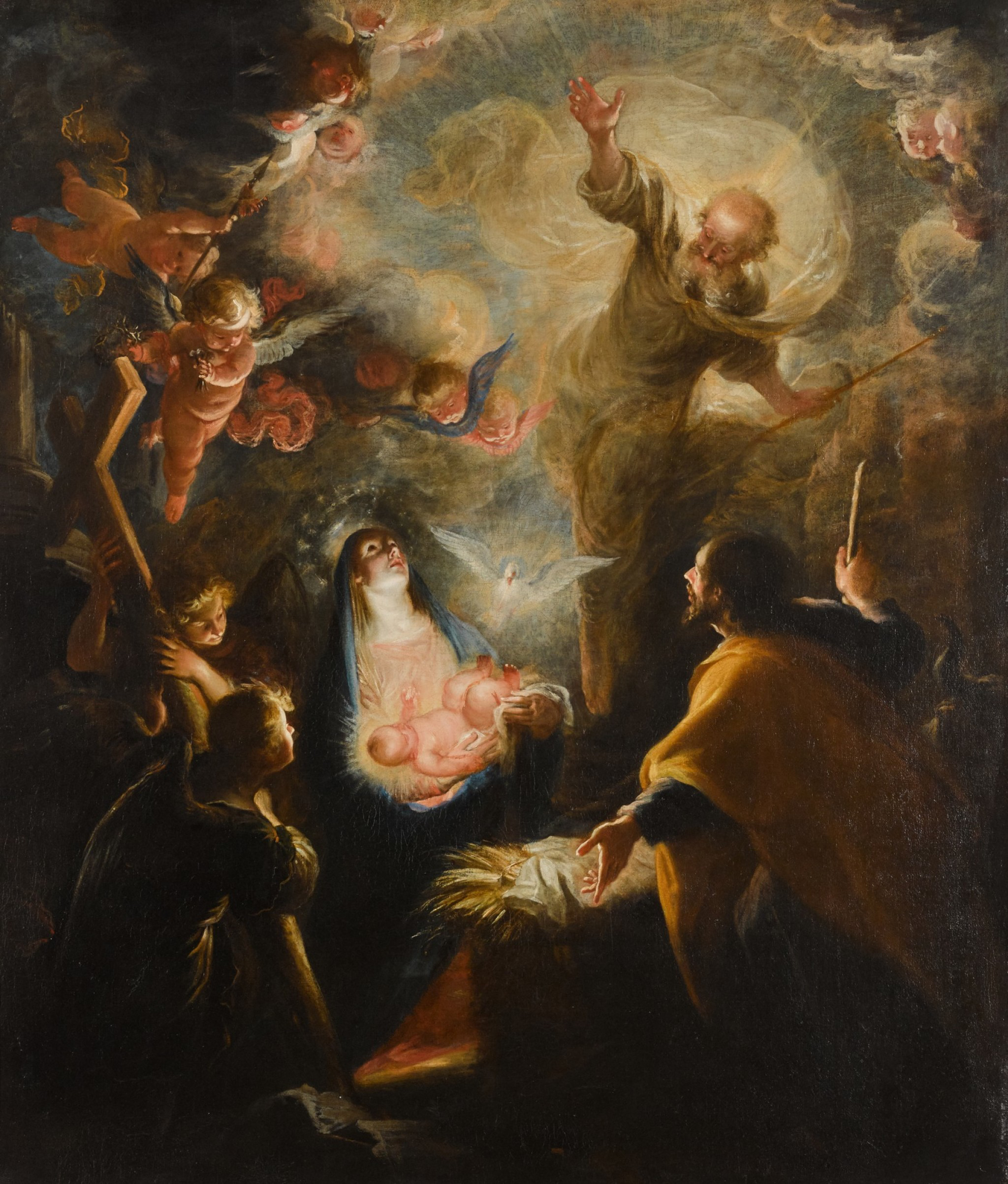
The Nativity

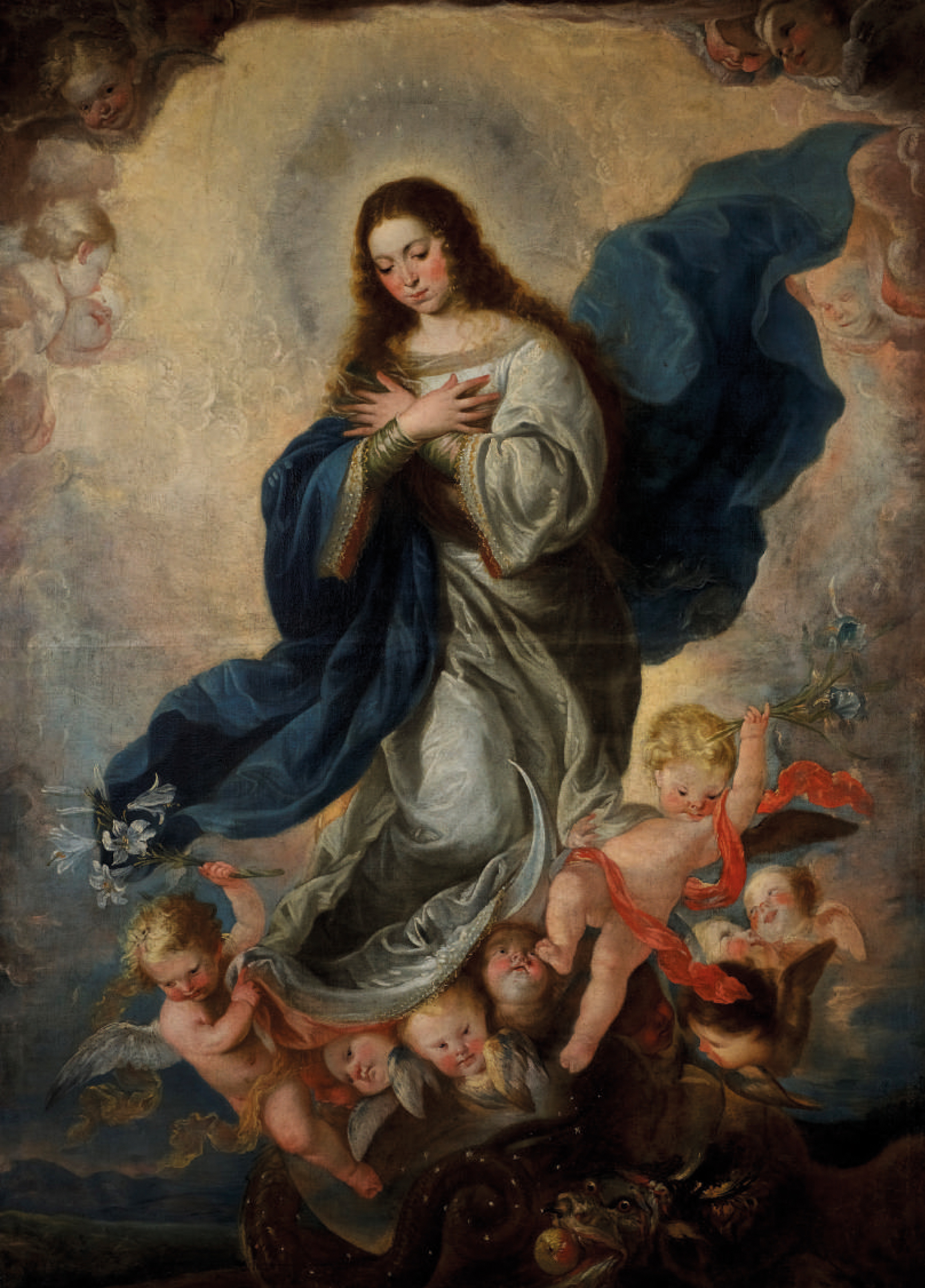
Immaculate Conception
