= Sebastián Muñoz (painter) =

Spanish Baroque painter

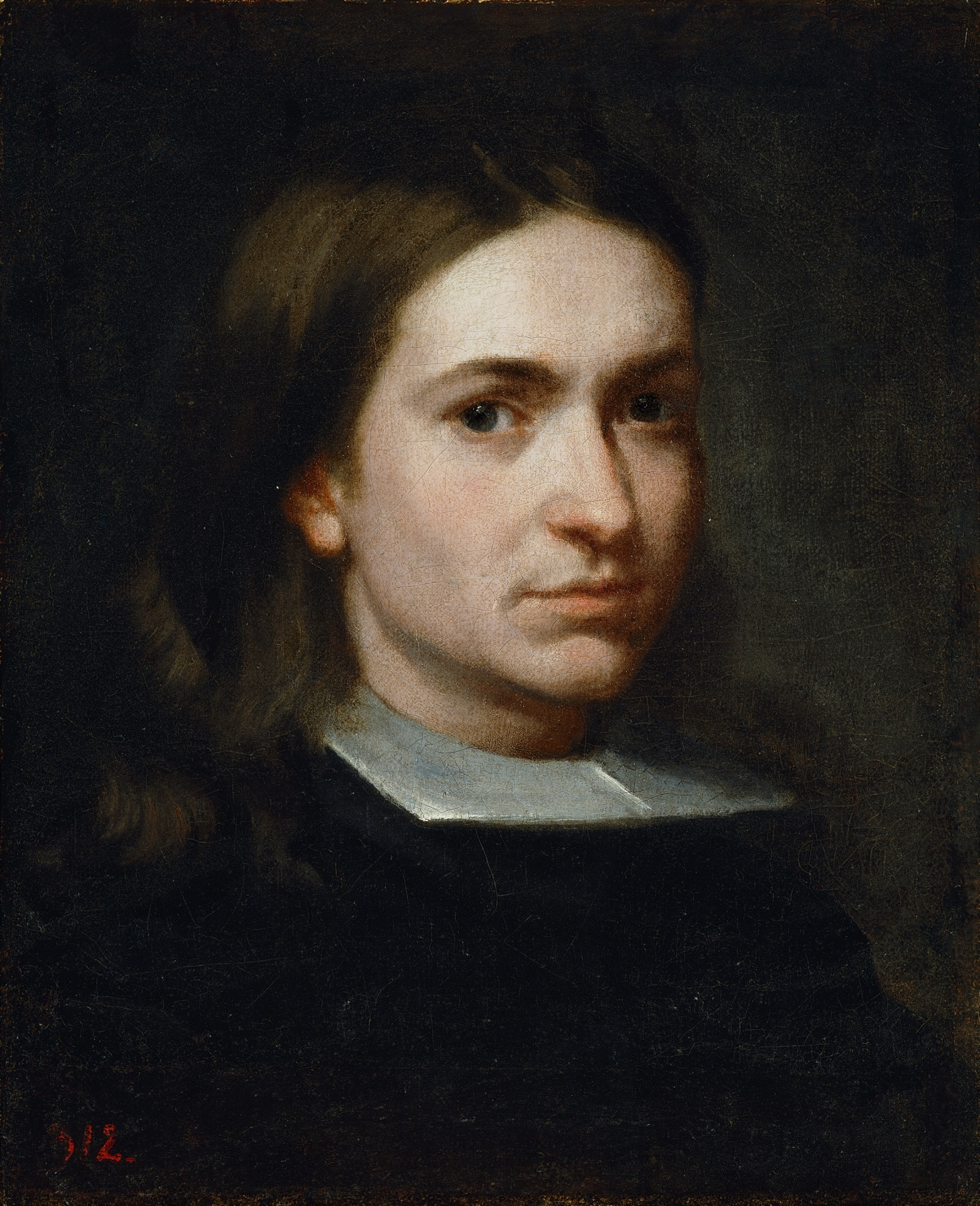
Self-portrait (date unknown)

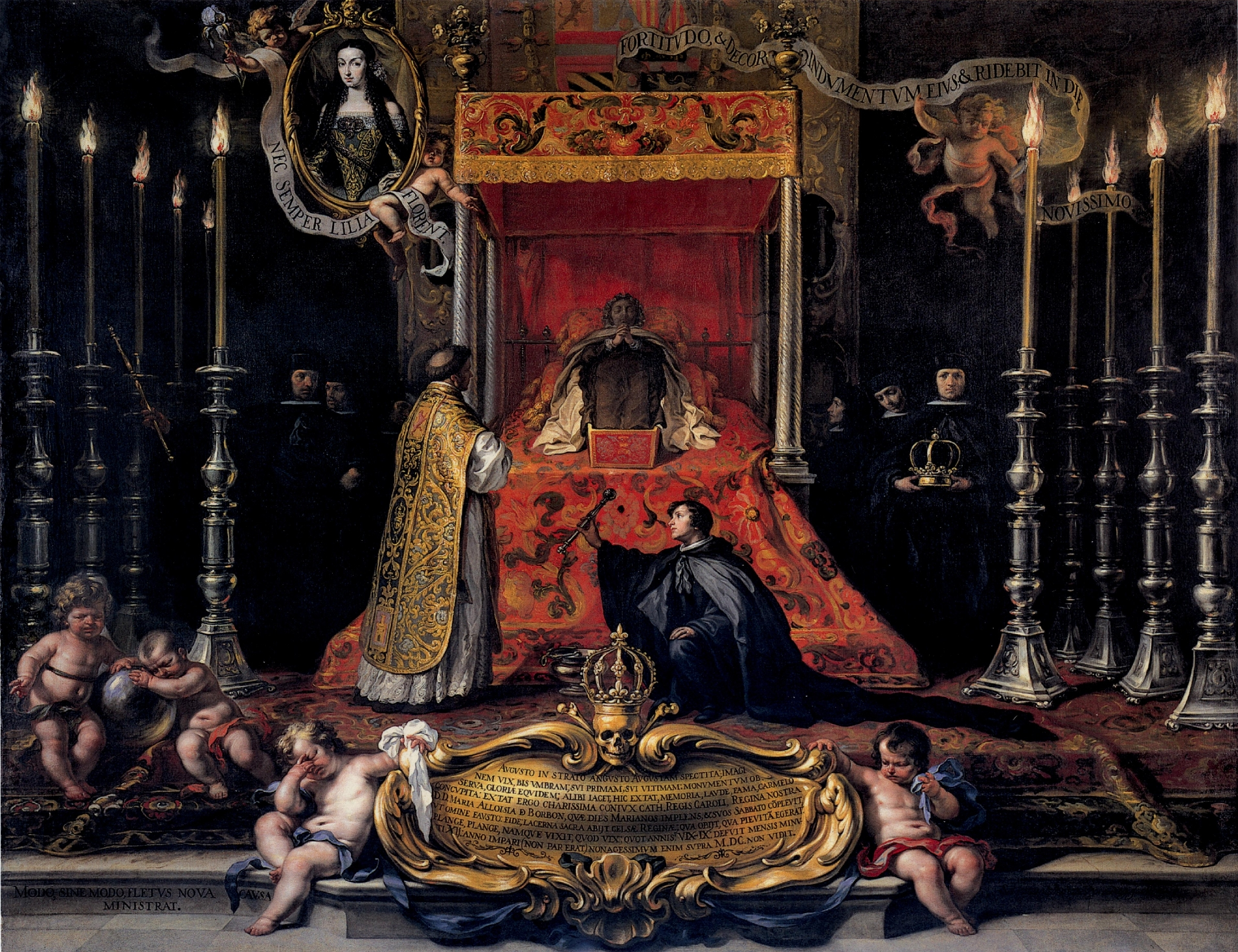
Queen Marie Louise, Lying in State

Sebastián Muñoz (c.1654, Casarrubios del Monte - 20 March 1690, Madrid) was a Spanish Baroque painter.

== Life and work ==
In 1670, he became an apprentice in the workshop of Hipólito de Torres. By January 1680, he had come to Madrid, assisting Claudio Coello with decorations to celebrate the arrival of Marie Louise d'Orléans, the new wife of King Charles II. He used the money that he earned from his work with Coello to go to Italy. Later that year, he joined expatriate Spanish painters in petitioning the King to establish a Spanish painting academy in Rome. While there, he apparently studied with Carlo Maratta. On his return to Spain, he stopped in Zaragoza, where he once again served as an assistant to Coello, painting frescoes in the Iglesia de la Mantería.

Once back in Madrid, in 1686, he worked at the Royal Alcázar, where he painted the ceiling of the Queen's room with a scene from Orlando Furioso. Only a preparatory sketch of his work has survived today. Elsewhere in the palace, he created a scene from the mythological story of Psyche and Cupid, which earned him an appointment as court painter. It has since been lost. In 1689, he painted the Queen's funeral for the Convento del Carmen Calzado. It is said that the monks didn't recognize the Queen portrayed by him, so Muñoz had to place her portrait in a medallion, supported by angels.

At the Buen Retiro Palace, he worked on decorations for the private rooms of the new Queen, Maria Anna of Neuburg. At the same time, he began restoring the frescoes in the cupola at the Basilica of Nuestra Señora de Atocha. While occupied with the latter project, he slipped and fell to his death from the scaffolding. A monumental canvas depicting the "Martyrdom of Saint Andrew" was left unfinished at the parish church in his hometown. It was later completed by Francisco Ignacio Ruiz de la Iglesia, who made an effort to preserve Muñoz' style throughout.
