= Bartolomé Román =

Spanish painter

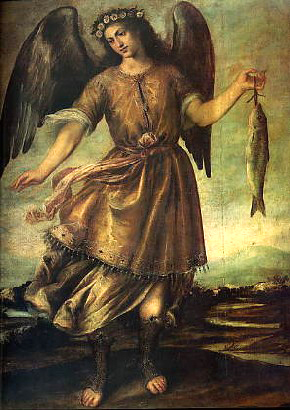
San Rafael Arcangel by Bartolomé Román, St. Peter's Church, Lima, before 1647, perhaps c. 1628)

Bartolomé Román (c. 1587 – 1647) was a Spanish Baroque painter known for his series of archangels.

== Early life and career ==
Born in Montoro, he was a disciple of Vincenzo Carducci, according to information provided by the art historian Antonio Palomino. The first canvas hand signed by Román, currently at the Museo del Prado, dated 1616. Three years later is a document that promised to produce a copy of a picture that he gave at the time of signature, which reveals both Román and Carducci securing the principals and, in the case of Román and other minor painters, recorded dependence of others, as seen also in some of his most famous works.

In 1628 he signed the large canvas of the Parable of the Wedding for the sacristy of the Royal Convent of La Encarnación in Madrid, which Palomino notes the influence of Diego Velázquez, established in Madrid shortly before. In the same monastery Madrid remains a painting of El Salvador, in the past attributed to Carducci, very close to another stored in the Bowes Museum in Barnard Castle, in which Christ appears in a blue tunic dress.

From 1629 there is abundant documentary evidence relating to the painter and the paintings signed by him. A year later Román worked for the Archdiocese of Toledo, in 1634 intervened with other painters in the complex litigation that painters from Madrid faced questions regarding the dignity of the office, and in 1639 was reviewed by the Cortes Generales. In 1644 he signed the Martyrdom of St. Bartholomew in the Carmelite convent of Calahorra (now lost).

In May 1647 he made his will, which shows that the painter had lived in a struggling economic situation, he noted his wife, Mary of Thebes, but did not provide the wedding day. According to Palomino, Román was later the teacher of Juan Carreño de Miranda.
