= Antonio Ricci (painter) =

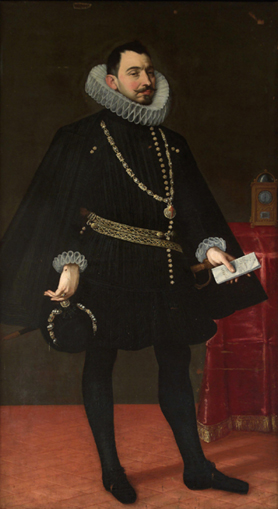
Juan de Ciriza, Marques de Montejaso

Antonio Ricci (c.1565 in Ancona – c.1635 in Madrid) was a Spanish Baroque painter of Italian origin.

== Biography ==
He came to Spain in 1583, along with several other painters accompanying Federico Zuccaro, to perform decorative work at El Escorial. After six months, they were all dismissed, but he decided to remain there. In 1588, he married Gabriela de Chaves de Guevara and established himself in Madrid, where he occasionally appears in the municipal records. The poet, Alonso de Castillo Solórzano, in his Donaires del Parnaso, dedicated some verses to an "Antonio Riche", which was likely him.

He and Gabriela had eleven children, including Juan (1600) and Francisco (1614), who both became painters. Little of his work has been preserved, although he is known to have presided over a busy workshop, where one of his clients was the Patriarch, Juan de Ribera. Among his few identified works are portraits of the Dukes of Ciriza and Sister Margarita de la Cruz, the daughter of Emperor Maximilian II, which is in the Convent of Las Descalzas Reales. A signed "Penitent Magdalene" has also been preserved. Despite this, he was not above doing minor works, such as 72 "slabs" with angels for a reliquary.

In Madrid, he maintained contact with the intellectual circles at court and participated in efforts to establish an Academy of San Lucas in Madrid, modeled after the Academy in Rome. In 1616, he was appointed as Madrid's official "Inspector of Cleaning and Paving" and, in 1631, wrote a letter to a Don Alonso de Villegas, detailing his experiments in alchemy. Two years later, he went bankrupt. In 1635, his wife died in jail, as a debtor. She was not described as a widow, so it may be assumed he was still alive at that time, but nothing further is known.
