= José de Ledesma =

Spanish painter

José de Ledesma (1630–1670) was a Spanish painter of the Baroque period.

Ledesma, born in Burgos painted large devotional canvases. After initial training in his native city, he moved to Madrid and entered the school of Juan Carreño de Miranda.
