= Claudio Coello =

Spanish painter

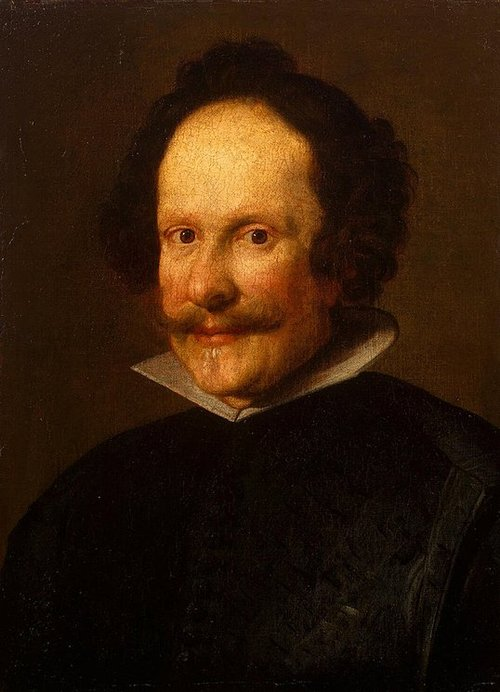
Self portrait

Claudio Coello (2 March 1642 – 20 April 1693) was a Spanish-Portuguese Baroque painter. Coello is considered the last great Spanish painter of the 17th century.

The son of Faustino Coello, a famous Portuguese sculptor, he was a court painter for Charles II. He worked on many churches and public buildings in Madrid, with his most famous work being in the sacristy of El Escorial, which is filled with portraits of priests and courtiers.

== Life and work ==
Claudio Coello was of Portuguese parents (his surname comes from a Portuguese word, "coelho", meaning rabbit), but was born in Madrid in 1642. There, he was instructed in art by Francisco Rizi, and while still in that school, made an altarpiece for San Plácido at Madrid. His acquaintance with the court painter, Juan Carreño de Miranda, allowed him the permission to visit the royal collection, where he made his greatest advance by studying the works of Titian, Rubens, and van Dyck. His friendship with José Jiménez Donoso, under whom he studied in Rome, was not less advantageous for him. In conjunction with Jiménez Donoso, he painted frescoes in Madrid and Toledo and painted the Triumphal Arch for the entrance of the queen, Maria Louisa of Orleans. He became well-known from these paintings and was employed by the Archbishop of Saragossa in 1683. He was made painter to Charles II, by whom he was employed in the Escorial.

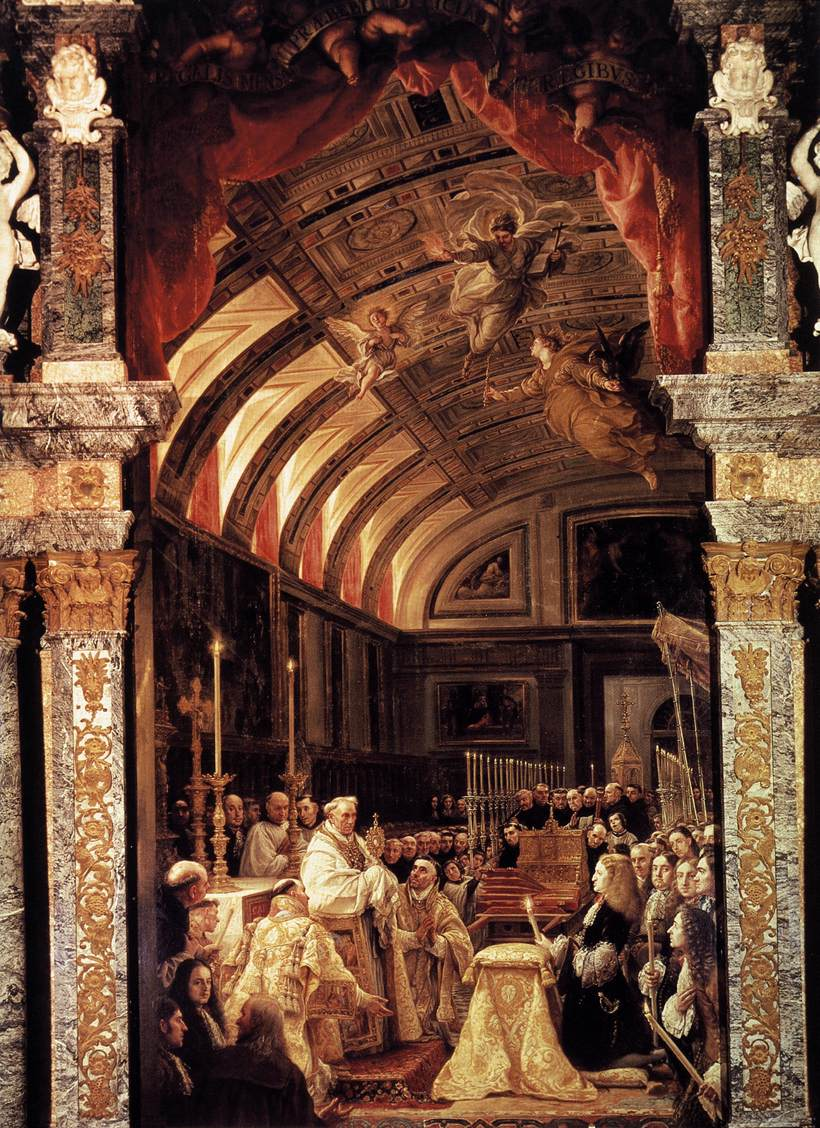
La Sagrada Forma, by Claudio Coello, El Escorial

Coello was the last Spanish painter of eminence for some years, as from the time that Luca Giordano was summoned to Spain, art fell gradually into decay. Many examples of his work can be seen in churches and convents in Madrid, Saragossa, and Salamanca.

His principal work is the altarpiece in the sacristy of San Lorenzo in the Escorial, representing the Adoration of the Miraculous Host. Coello worked on it for seven years. In the crowd of personages that form the procession, there are more than fifty portraits, including those of the king and the principal figures of the court.

Coello etched three plates, viz. : — 'Christ on the Cross, with the Virgin, St. Augustine, and St. Monica,' and the portraits of Charles II and his mother. He was the instructor of Sebastián Muñoz and Teodoro Ardmans.

== Selected works ==
- Budapest Gallery. St. Joseph with the Virgin and Child.
- Madrid. S. Placido. An altar-piece.
- Madrid, Palace. Cartoons, representing the Fable of Cupid and Psyche, painted by Ant. Palomino.
- Madrid, Museum. Assumption of the Virgin (Two), Portrait of Charles II. of Spain, St. Rosa of Lima, and The Apotheosis of St. Augustin.
- Munich. Gallery. St. Peter of Alcantara.
- Petersburg. Hermitage. His own Portrait and The Magdalen.
- Saragossa. Augustinian Church. The frescoes in the cupola.
- Madrid (province). El Escorial. The Adoration of the Host. (His chef-d'oeuvre.)
- Saint Catherine of Alexandria Dominating the Emperor Maxentius

== Gallery ==
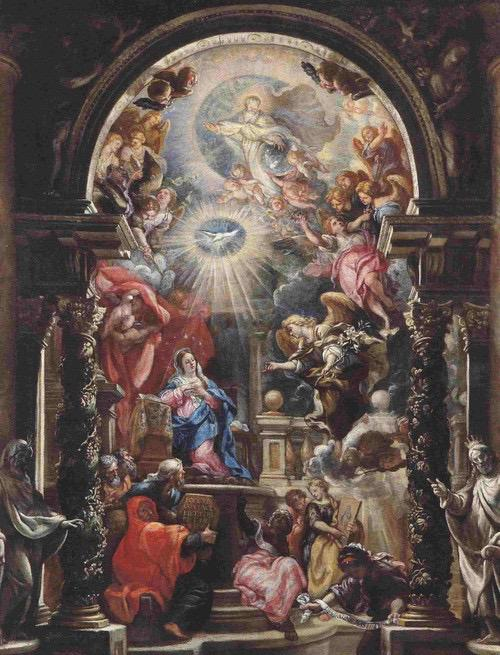
The Annunciation (1668)

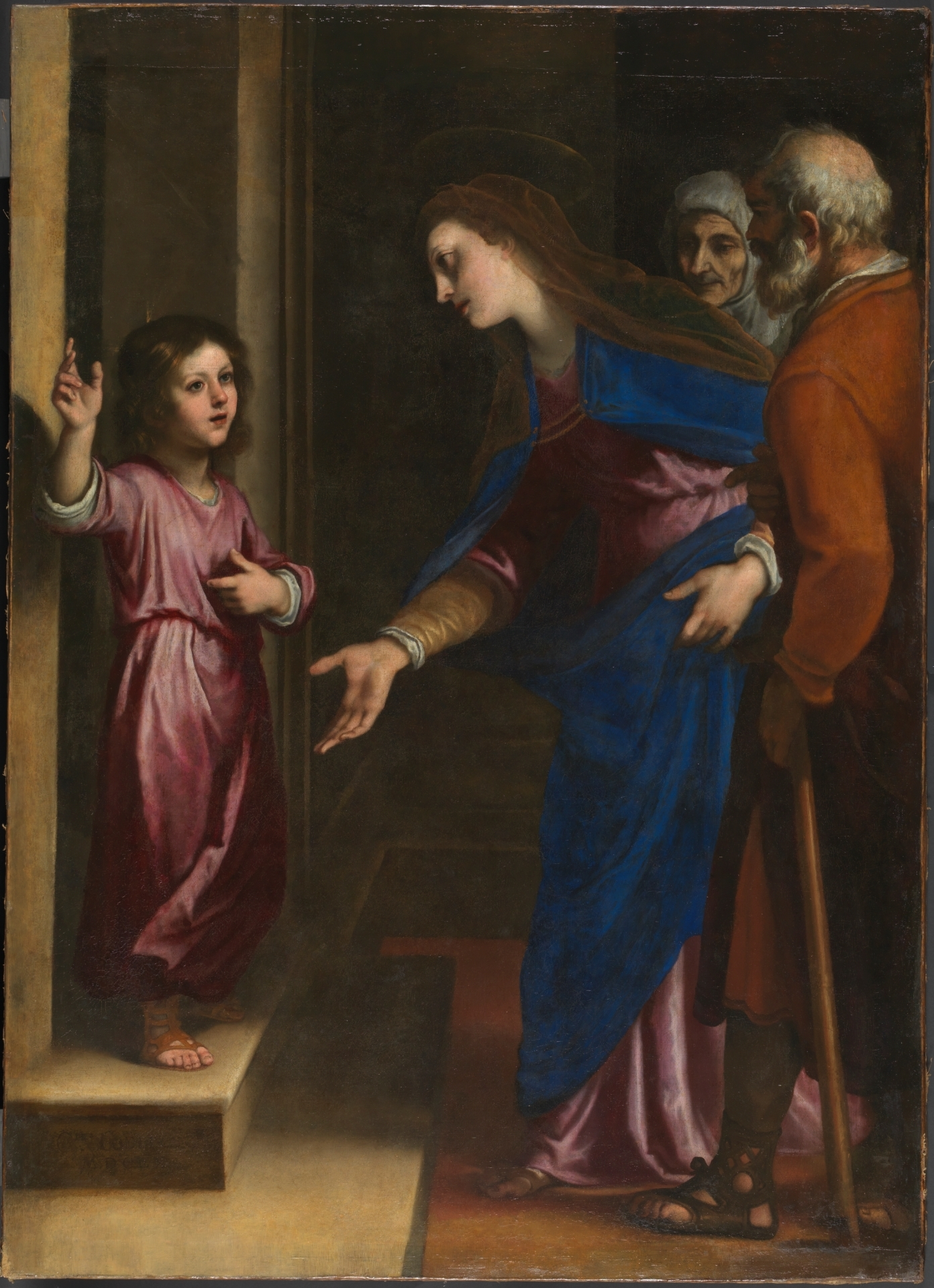
Boy Jesus at the Door of the Temple (1660)

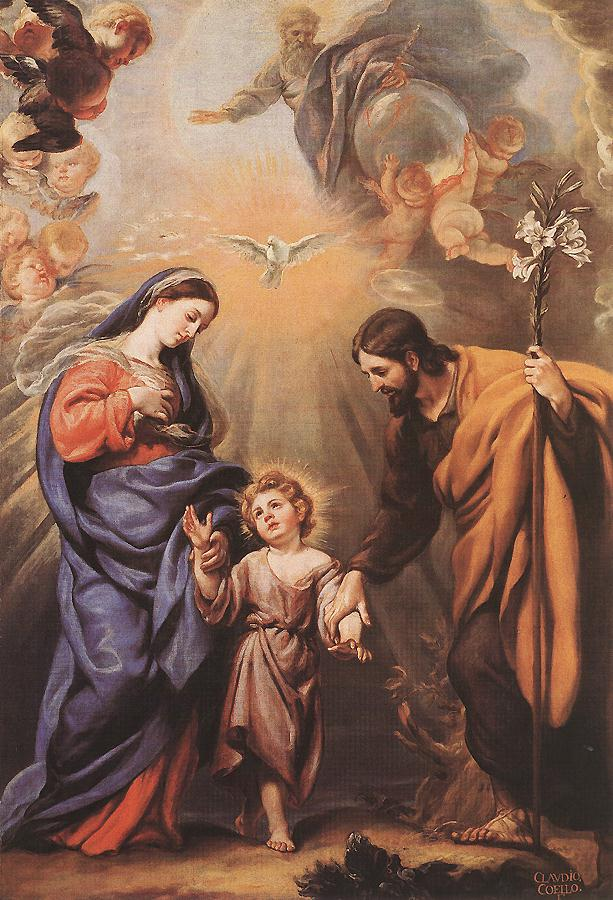
Holy Family

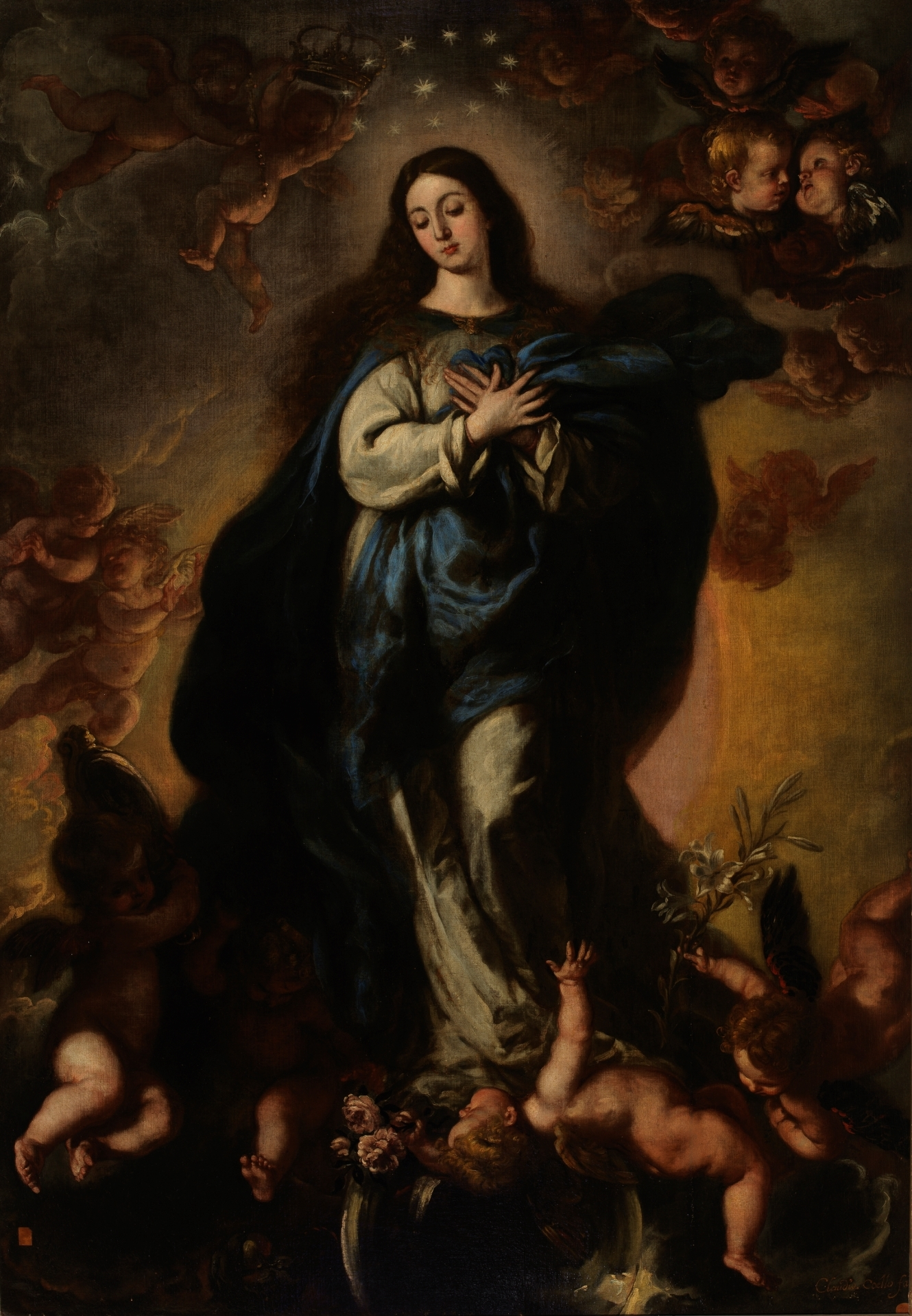
The Immaculate Conception

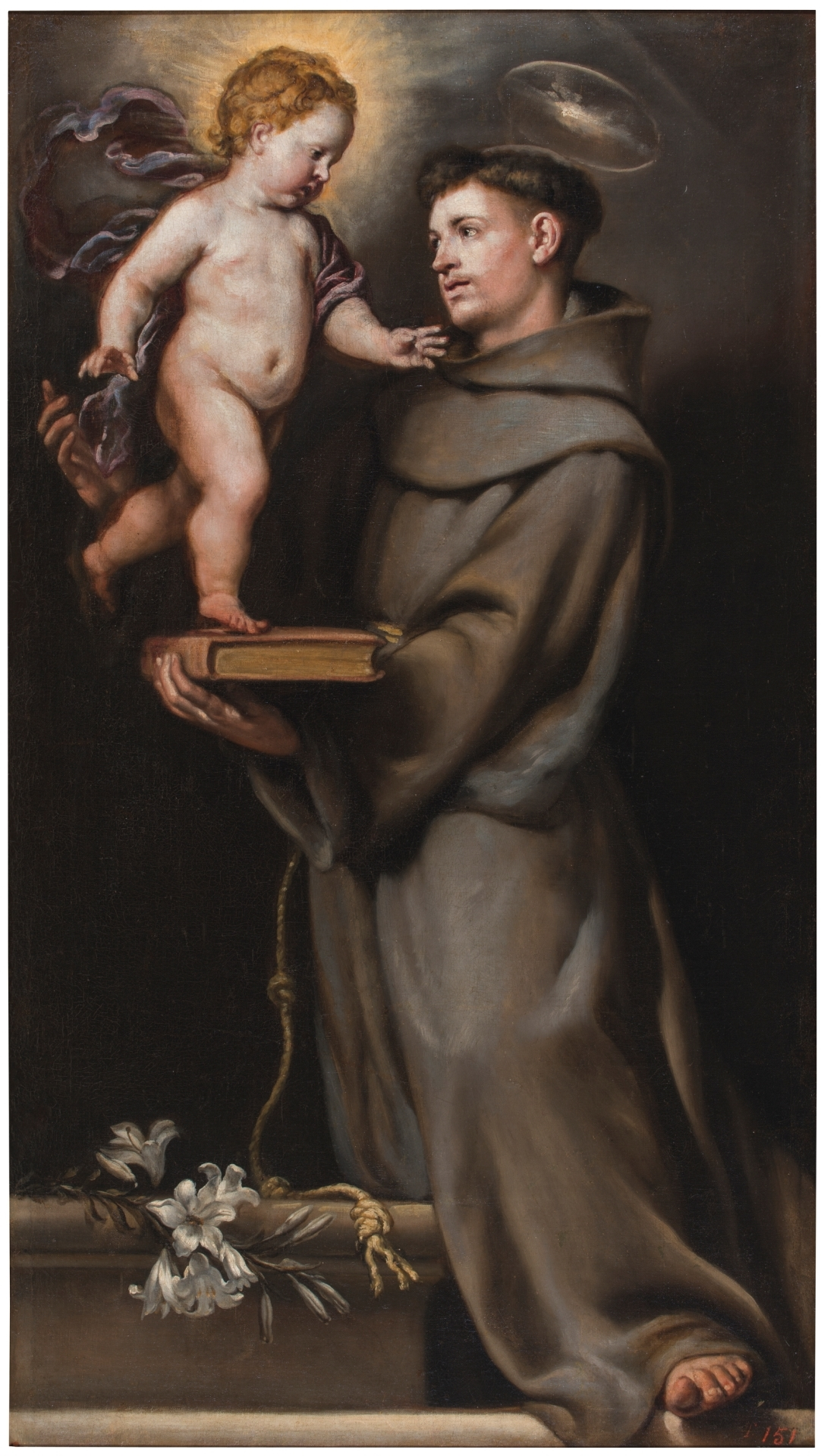
Saint Anthony of Padua

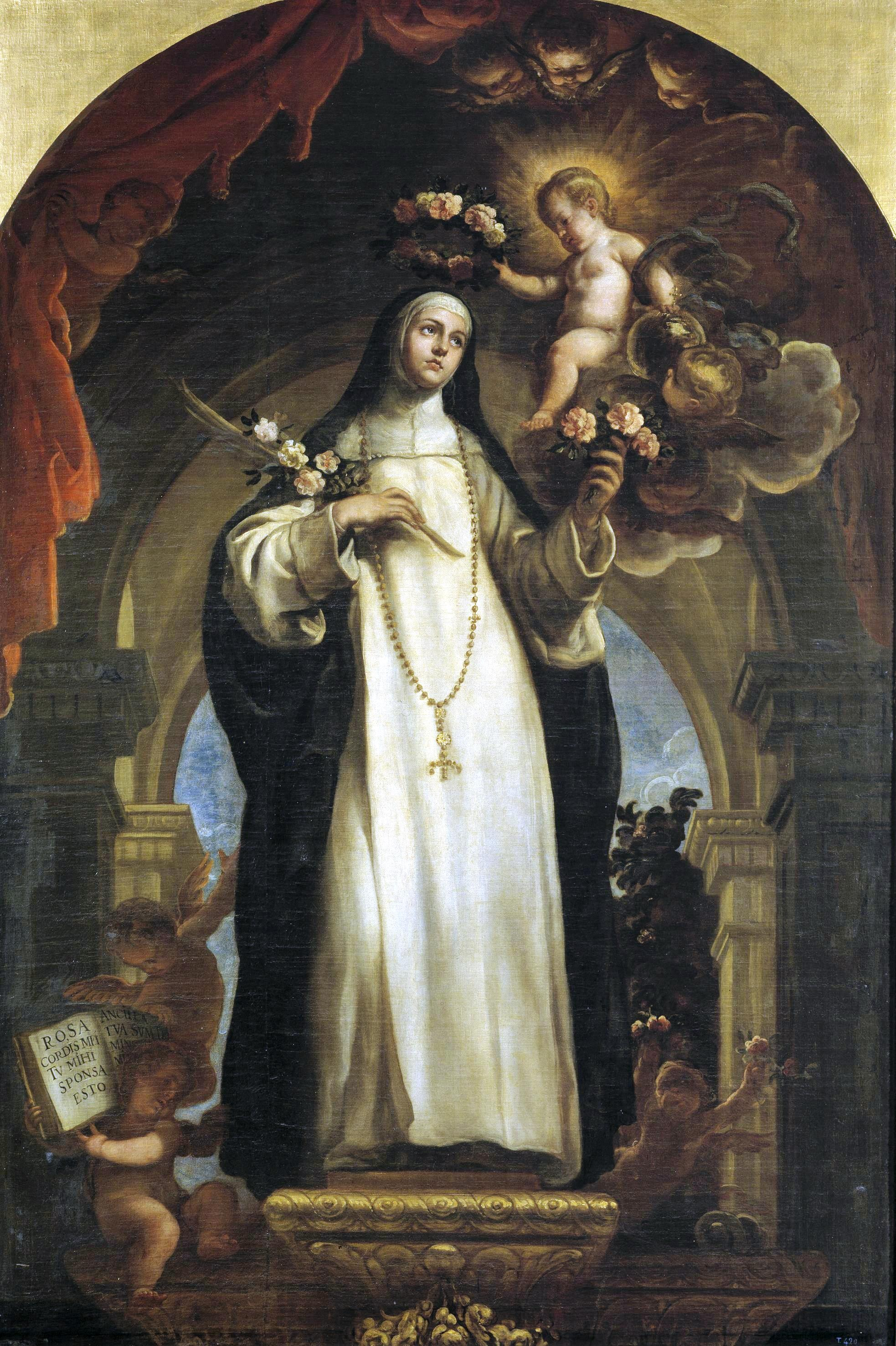
Saint Rose of Lima

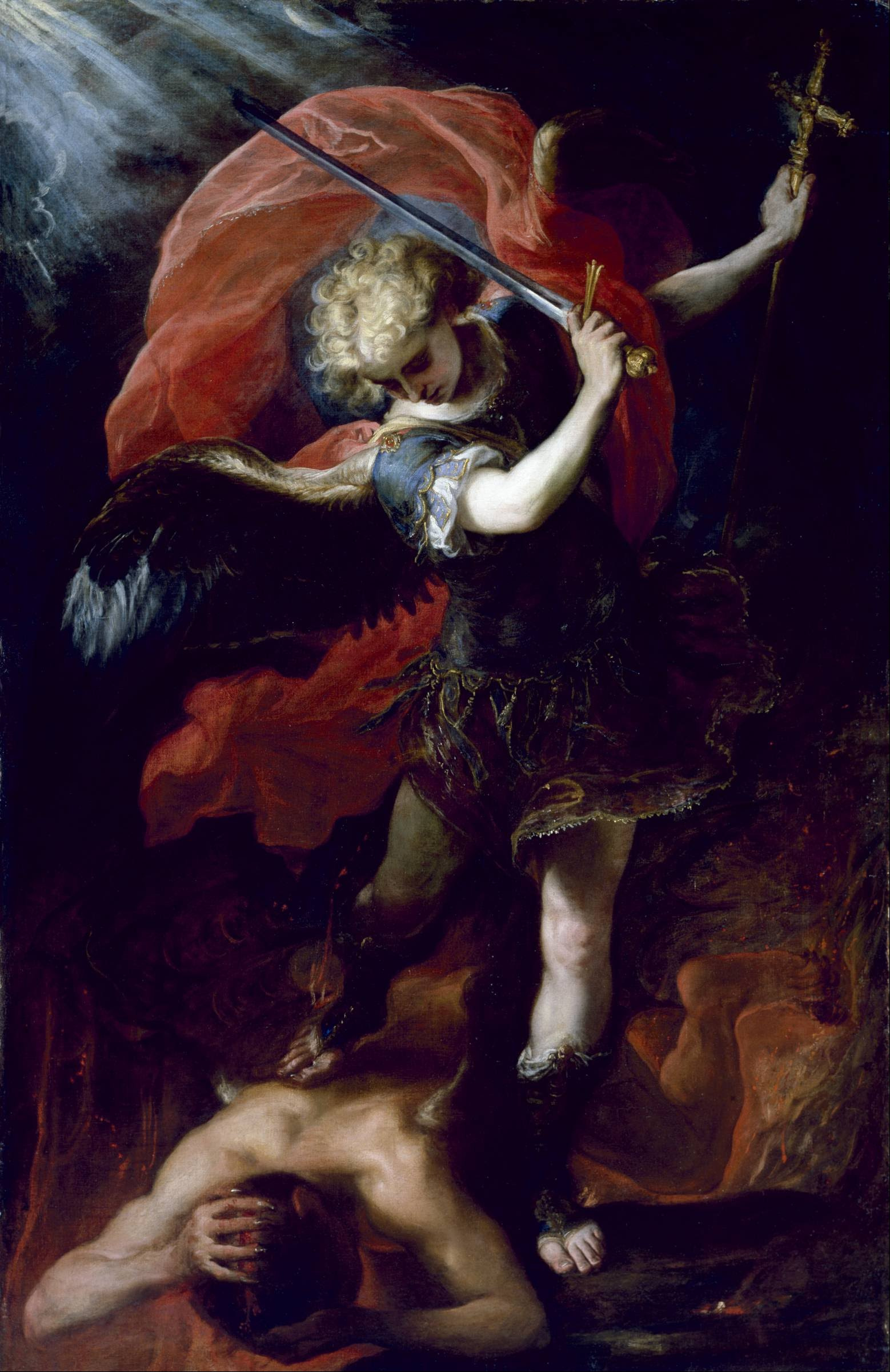
Saint Michael the Archangel

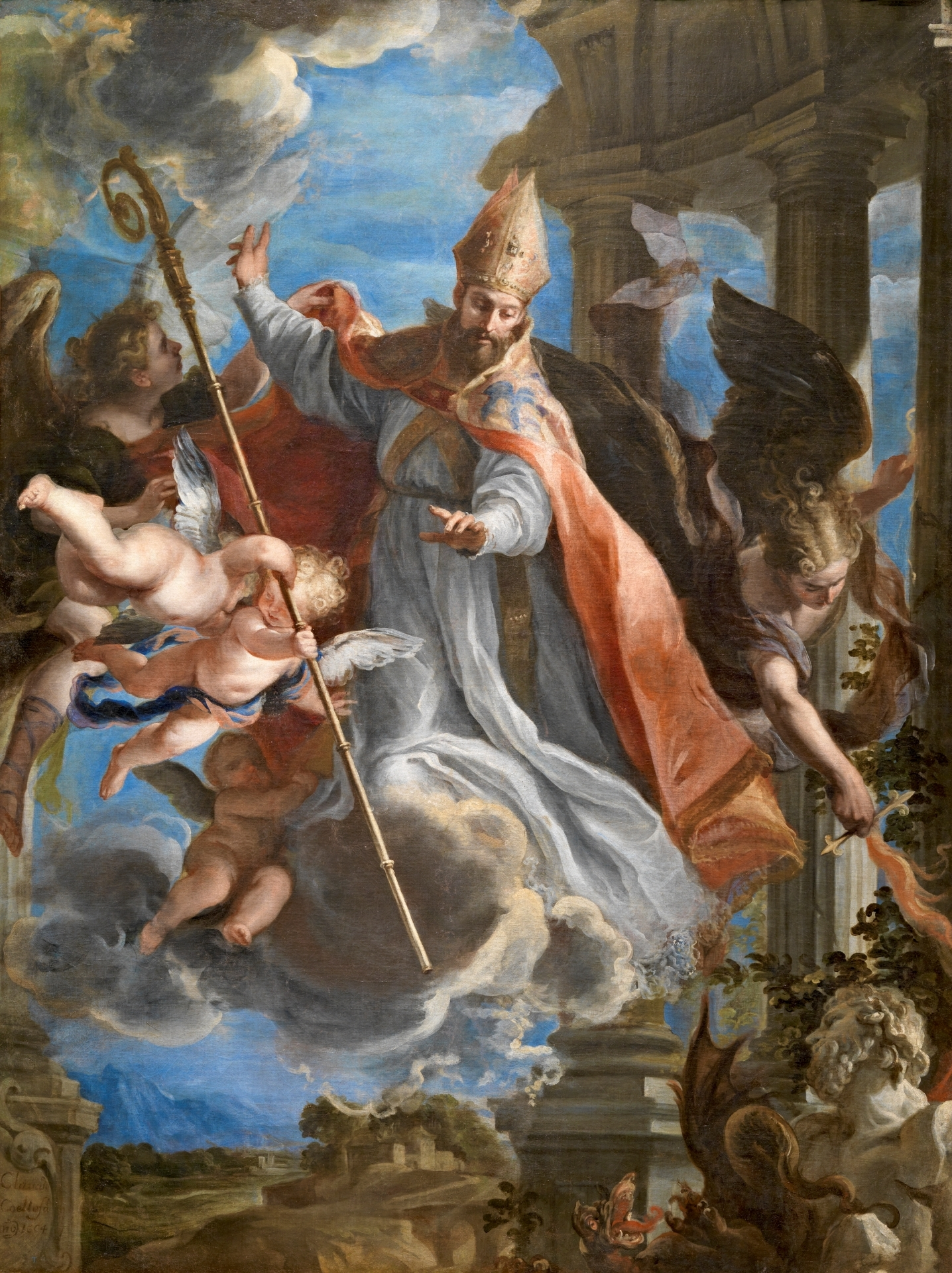
The Triumph of Saint Augustine

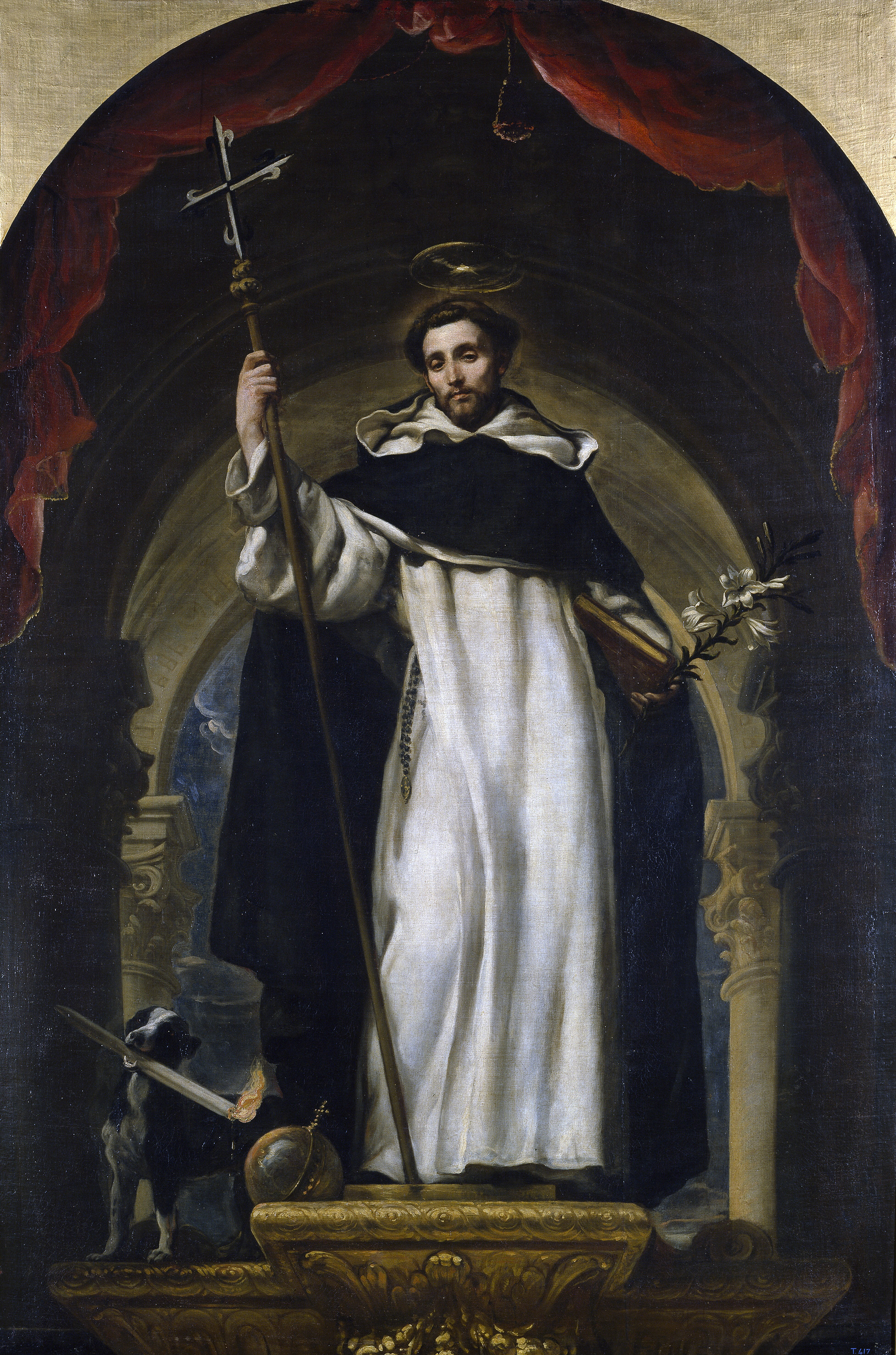
Saint Dominic de Guzmán (1685)

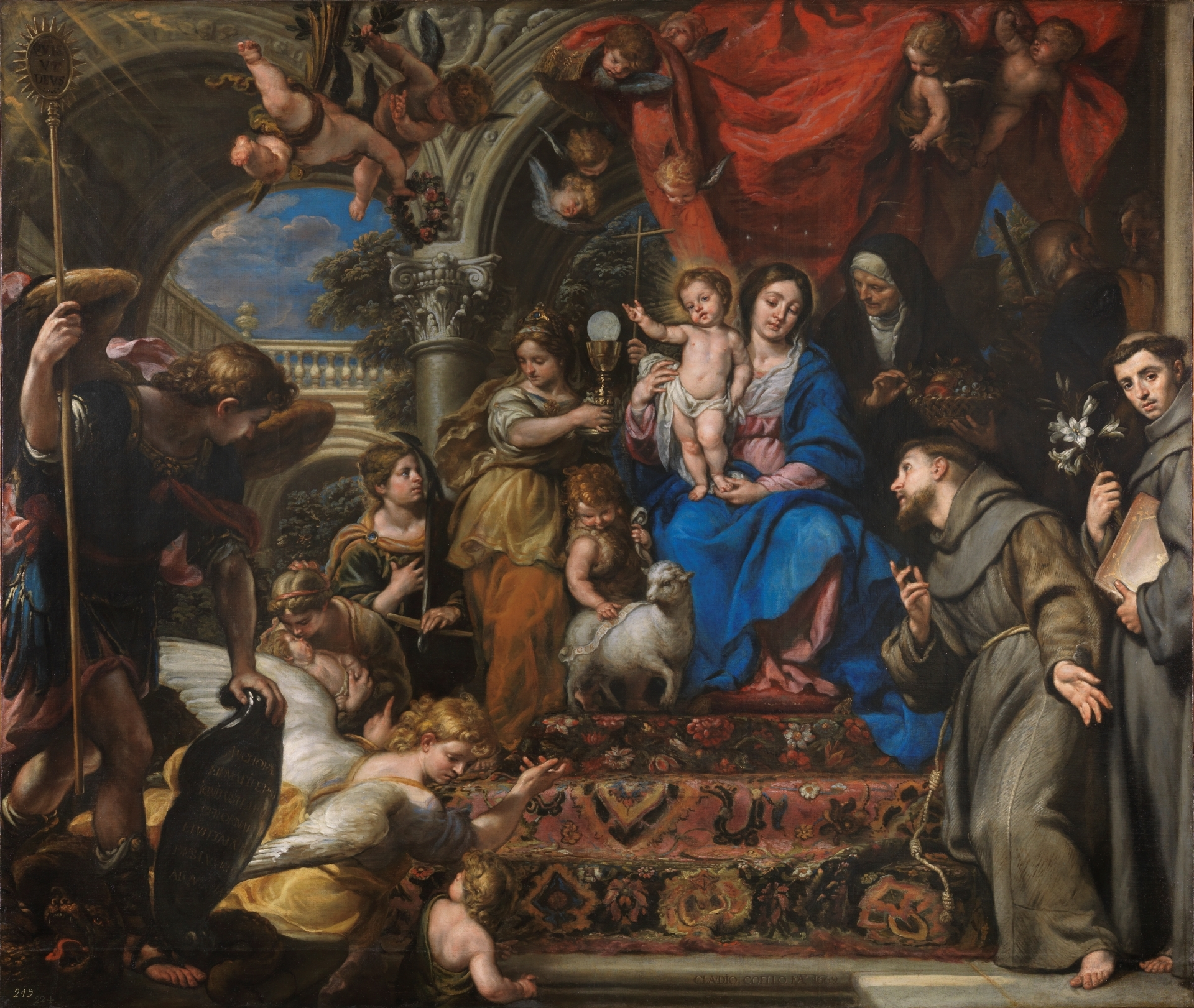
The Virgin with the Child between the Theological Virtues and Saints (1669)
