= Juan Martín Cabezalero =

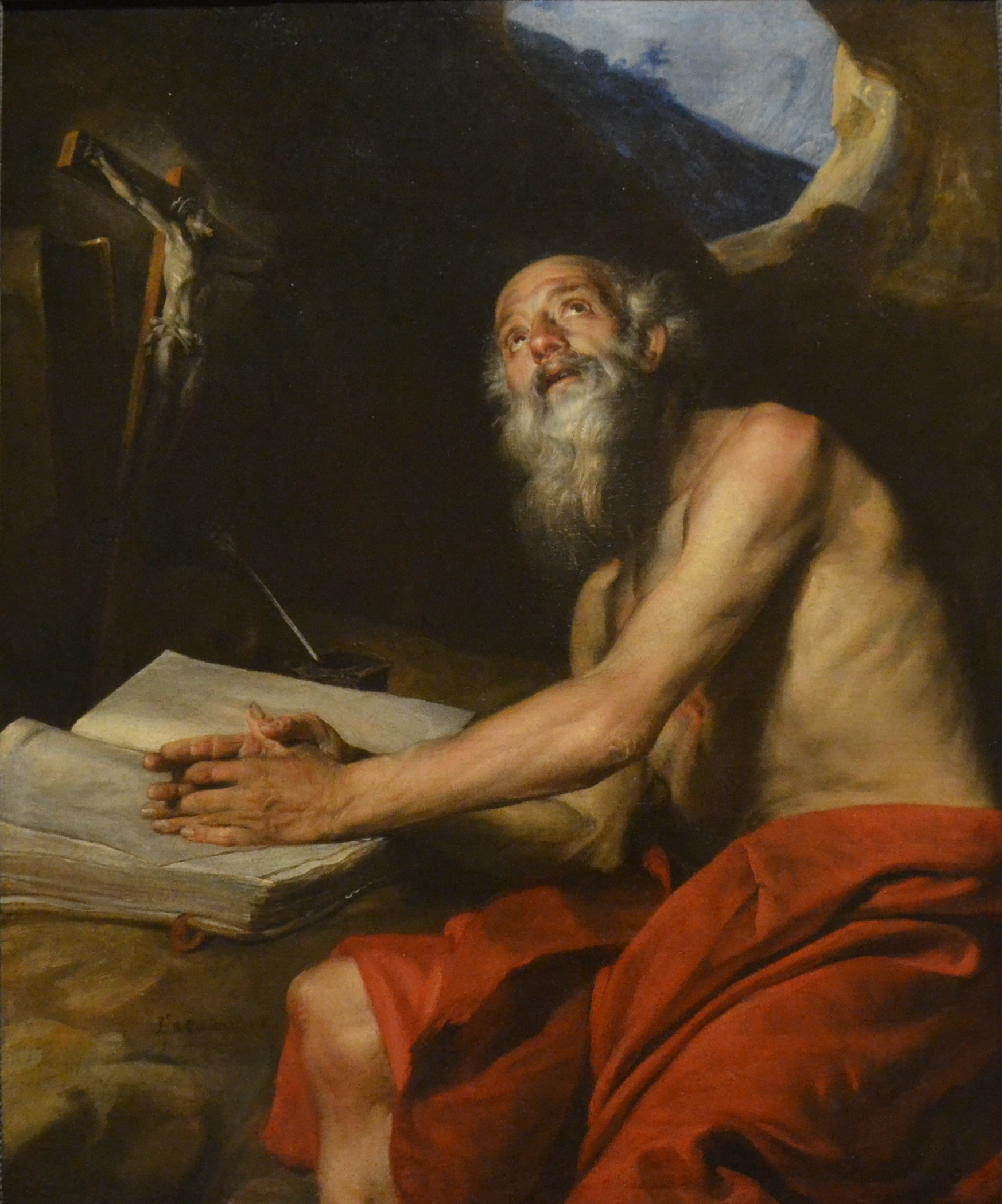
Saint Jerome

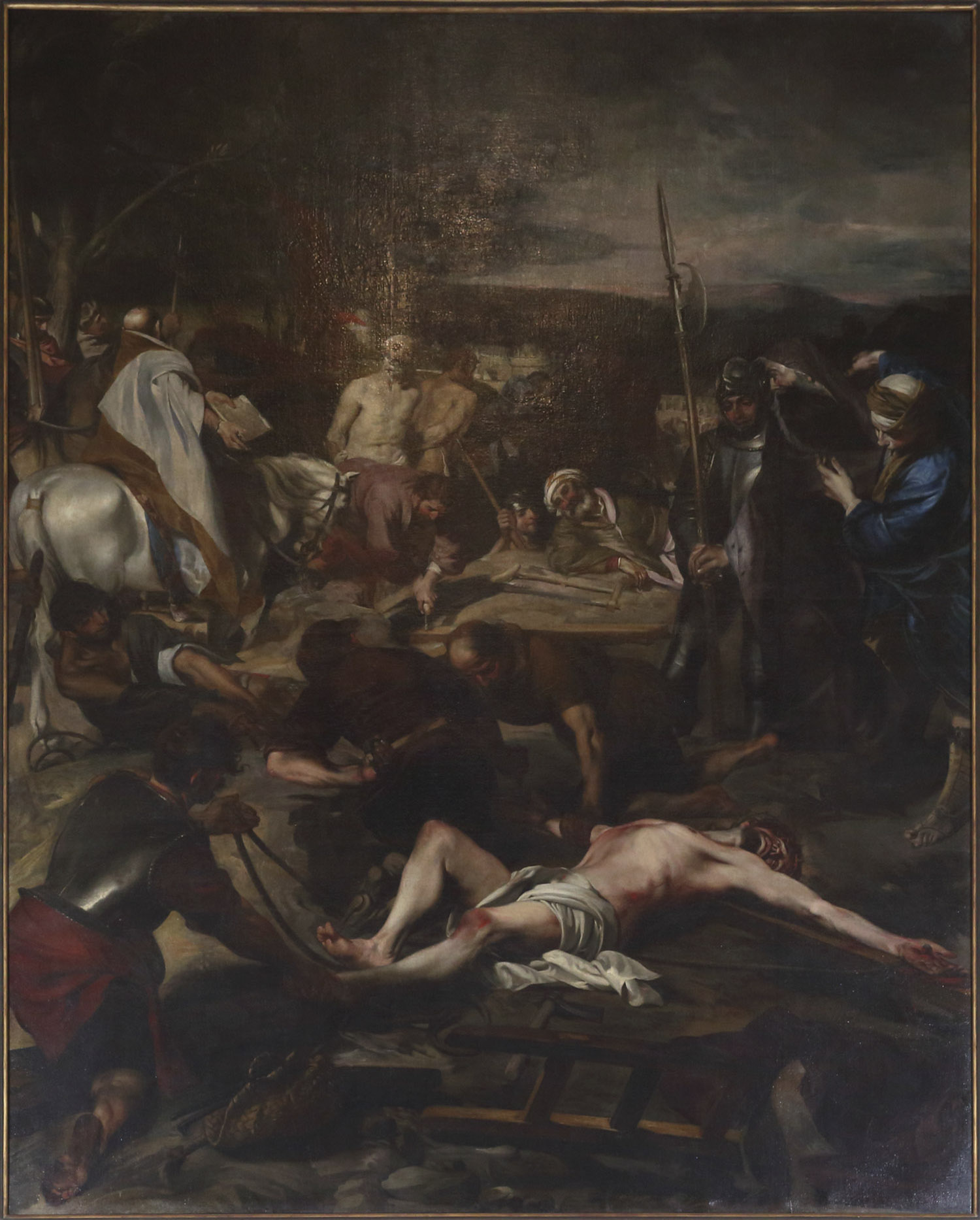
The Crucifixion

Juan Martín Cabezalero (August 1645, in Almadén – 24 June 1673, in Madrid) was a Spanish Baroque painter.

== Life and works ==
Earlier accounts place his birth in 1633, but baptismal documents indicate that it was 1645. At some point, his family moved to Madrid, where he trained with Juan Carreño de Miranda. His first signed work dates from 1666; a depiction of Saint Jerome, now at the Meadows Museum in Dallas, which shows the influence of Anthony van Dyck.

In 1667, he received a commission to create four large canvases on the Passion of Christ for the chapel of the Christ of Sorrows of the Third Order of Saint Francis, for which he would be paid 1,550 reales each. They were completed the following year and constitute the only full set of works he is known to have produced. They show the influence of Flemish art. Six smaller works in the sacristy were attributed to him by the art historian, Antonio Palomino, but this has been questioned. He also executed three canvases in collaboration with José Jiménez Donoso. It is likely that he also painted some frescoes, although none have survived. An oil painting of the Pentecost is preserved at the Abbey of Santo Domingo de Silos, along with The Communion of Saint Teresa.

The last documents relating to his life are an appraisal of his art collection and a will, which he was unable to sign himself. His estate passed to his mother, Isabel, who survived him by ten years and, per his wishes, he was interred at St Sebastian's Church, Madrid. The cause of death is unknown.
