= Juan Rizi =

Spanish painter

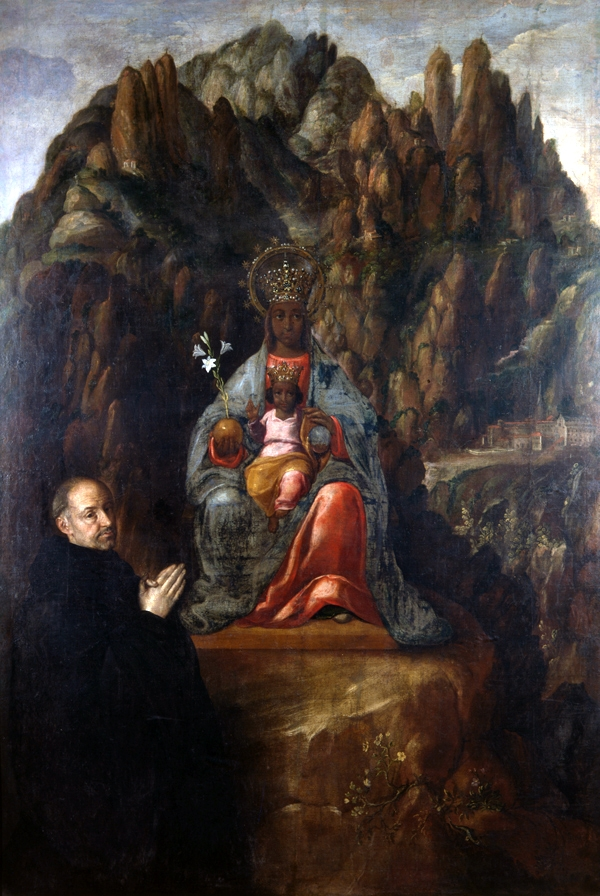
The Virgin of Montserrat with a Monk

Friar Juan Andrés Ricci de Guevara, known as Friar Juan Rizi (1600, Madrid - 29 November 1681, Monte Cassino) was a Spanish Benedictine monk, painter, and architect, in the Baroque style. He also wrote works on theology and geometry and may have been nominated to become a bishop.

== Life and works ==
He was the son of the Italian painter, Antonio Ricci, who had come to Spain to work on decorations for El Escorial. His brother, Francisco Rizi, was also a painter. He appears to have begun his apprenticeship with his father, but he is known to have attended the workshops of Juan Bautista Maíno as well.

In 1627, he joined the Benedictine Order and took up residence at Santa Maria de Montserrat Abbey and apparently studied law at the University of Salamanca. He was expelled from the Abbey in 1640, due to his strong advocacy of Castilian nationalism during the Reapers' War. Later, he was removed from the court of Prince Balthasar Charles, where he was employed as a drawing teacher, for opposing the appointment of a new Abbott made by King Philip IV.

After leaving the court, most of his work was done for the various monasteries where he lived: Irache, Santo Domingo de Silos, and San Millán de la Cogolla, among others. Most of those he painted at Montserrat were lost in a fire during the Peninsular War. In 1662, he moved to Rome and, in 1670, became a resident of Monte Cassino, where he died.

== Sources ==
- Biography in the Enciclopedia online @ the Museo del Prado
- Biography @ L'Enciclopèdia.cat. Barcelona: Grup Enciclopèdia Catalana
- Bryan, Michael (1889). Walter Armstrong; Robert Edmund Graves (eds.). Dictionary of Painters and Engravers, Biographical and Critical. Vol. II L-Z. London: George Bell and Sons. p. 388.
