= Francisco Rizi =

Spanish painter

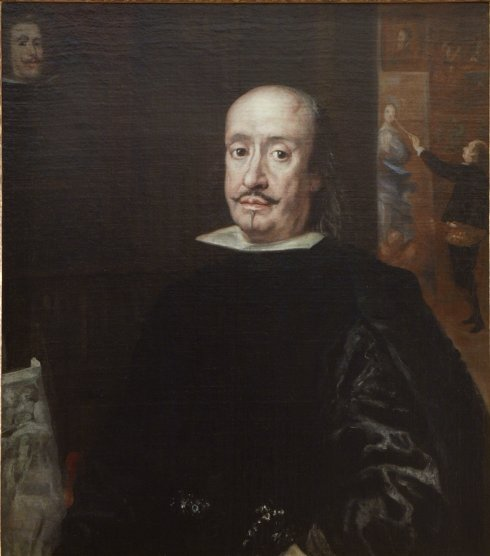
Francisco Rizi; portrait by Isidoro Arredondo (formerly considered a self-portrait of Juan Carreño de Miranda)

Francisco Rizi's Virgin and Child with Sts Philip and Francis, Oil on canvas, 1650, Public collection

Francisco Rizi, or Francisco Ricci de Guevara (9 April 1614 – 2 August 1685) was a Spanish painter of Italian ancestry.

== Biography ==
He was born in Madrid. His father, Antonio Ricci, was an Italian painter, originally from Ancona, who had come to Spain in 1583 to do decorative work at El Escorial. His brother, Juan, also became a painter. After beginning his apprenticeship in his father's workshop, he studied with Vicente Carducho, who was also of Italian origin.

Thanks to Carducho's influence, he was able to make contacts at the Royal Court in 1634. After Carducho's death in 1638, he joined with several other painters to create decorations for the Golden Salon at the Royal Alcázar of Madrid. These were destroyed in the Great Fire of 1734.

Between 1640 and 1649, he became one of the earliest painters in Spain to adopt the Baroque style. A notable example is the large altarpiece made for the Capuchins, in a style reminiscent of Pieter Paul Rubens or Anthony van Dyck. In 1649, he provided decorations to celebrate the arrival of Mariana of Austria, to become Queen, which brought him to the attention of the Court. He also maintained close ties to Toledo Cathedral, creating numerous canvases and frescoes; notably for the famous "Chapel of the Eighths" (the Ochavo). In 1653, he was named the official "Painter of the Cathedral", and would retain that position until his death.

In 1656, he was officially named a "Painter to the King". This began a large series of commissions from religious institutions that would keep him occupied throughout the 60s. He also opened a workshop where artists such as Claudio Coello received their first training. For many of these years, and into the 70s, he was the Director of stage decorations at the theater in Buen Retiro Palace. In 1661, he was granted permission to live in the Royal Alcázar.

In 1671, he was passed over for an appointment as Chamber Painter to Queen Mariana. The post went to Juan Carreño de Miranda and, two years later, he filed a formal grievance, citing his seniority. In 1675, the Queen granted him a small pension, but his standing at court never fully recovered. He continued in good standing with religious authorities, however.

In 1685, he received a major commission for a monumental canvas at El Escorial, depicting the "Holy Form". He died suddenly while working on it there. It was finished by his student, Coello.

== Selected works ==
- Decoration (together with Pedro Nuñez) at the theatre in the Real Alcázar of Madrid (1648).
- Scenery for the theatre of the Parque del Buen Retiro.
- Sketch for the altarpiece of the Host of Gorkum (the paintings for which were later completed by Claudio Coello) in the Sacristy of El Escorial.
- "Auto de Fé en la plaza Mayor de Madrid".

== Bibliography ==
- Antonio Palomino, An account of the lives and works of the most eminent Spanish painters, sculptors and architects, 1724, first English translation, 1739, p. 112
- Bryan, Michael (1889). Walter Armstrong; Robert Edmund Graves (eds.). Dictionary of Painters and Engravers, Biographical and Critical. Vol. II L-Z. London: George Bell and Sons. p. 388.
