= Juan Carreño de Miranda =

Spanish painter (1614–1685)

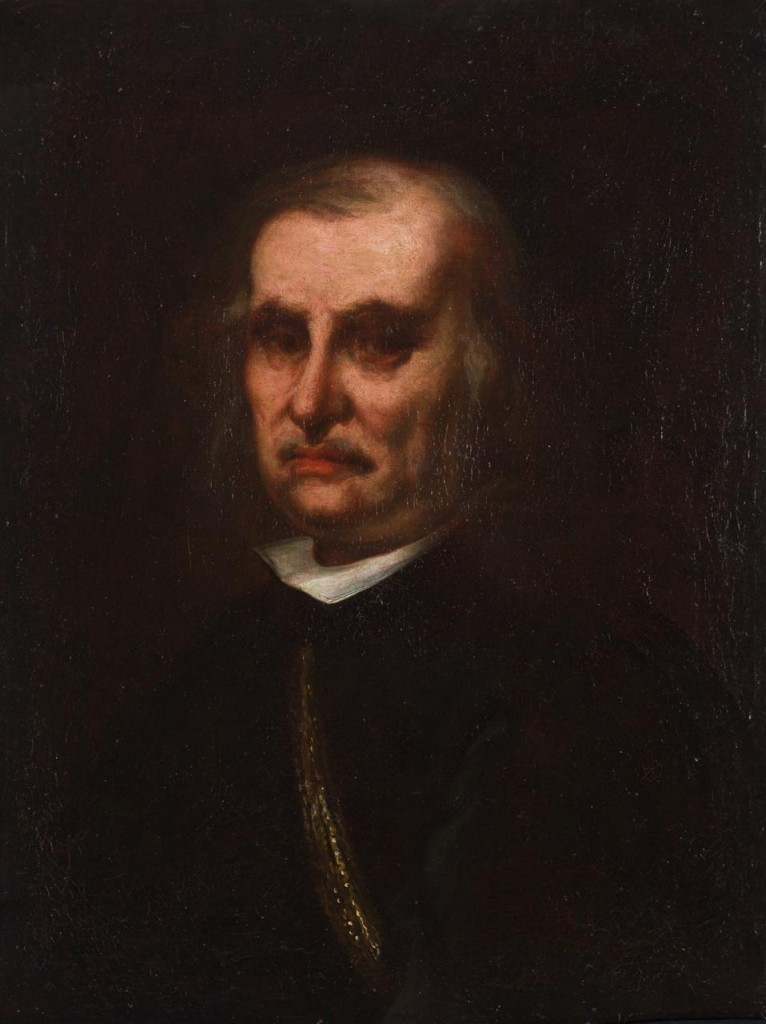
- Self-portrait, c. 1680
- Born: Juan Carreño de Miranda; 25 March 1614; Avilés, Spain
- Died: 3 October 1685 (aged 71); Madrid, Spain
- Known for: Painting

Juan Carreño de Miranda (25 March 1614 — 3 October 1685) was a Spanish painter of the Baroque period.

== Biography ==
Born in Avilés in Asturias, his father was a painter with the same name, Juan Carreño de Miranda. His family moved to Madrid in 1623, and he trained in Madrid during the late 1620s as an apprentice to Pedro de las Cuevas and Bartolomé Román. He came to the notice of Velázquez for his work in the cloister of Doña María de Aragón and in the Church of Our Lady of the Rosary (Iglesia de la Virgen del Rosario), Marlofa, La Joyosa.

In 1658, Carreño was hired as an assistant on a royal commission to paint frescoes in the Alcázar of Madrid; later destroyed in the fire of 1734. In 1671, upon the death of Sebastián de Herrera, he was appointed court painter to the queen (pintor de cámara) and began to paint primarily portraits. He refused to be knighted in the Order of Santiago, saying "Painting needs no honors, it can give them to the whole world". He is mainly recalled as a painter of portraits. His main pupils were Mateo Cerezo, Juan Martín Cabezalero, José Jiménez Donoso, and José de Ledesma. He died in Madrid.

Noble by descent, he had an understanding of the workings and psychology of the royal court as no painter before him, making his portraits of the Spanish royal family in an unprecedented documentary fashion. Most of his work are portraits of the royal family and court, though there are some altarpieces, early works commissioned mainly by the church.

== Selected works ==
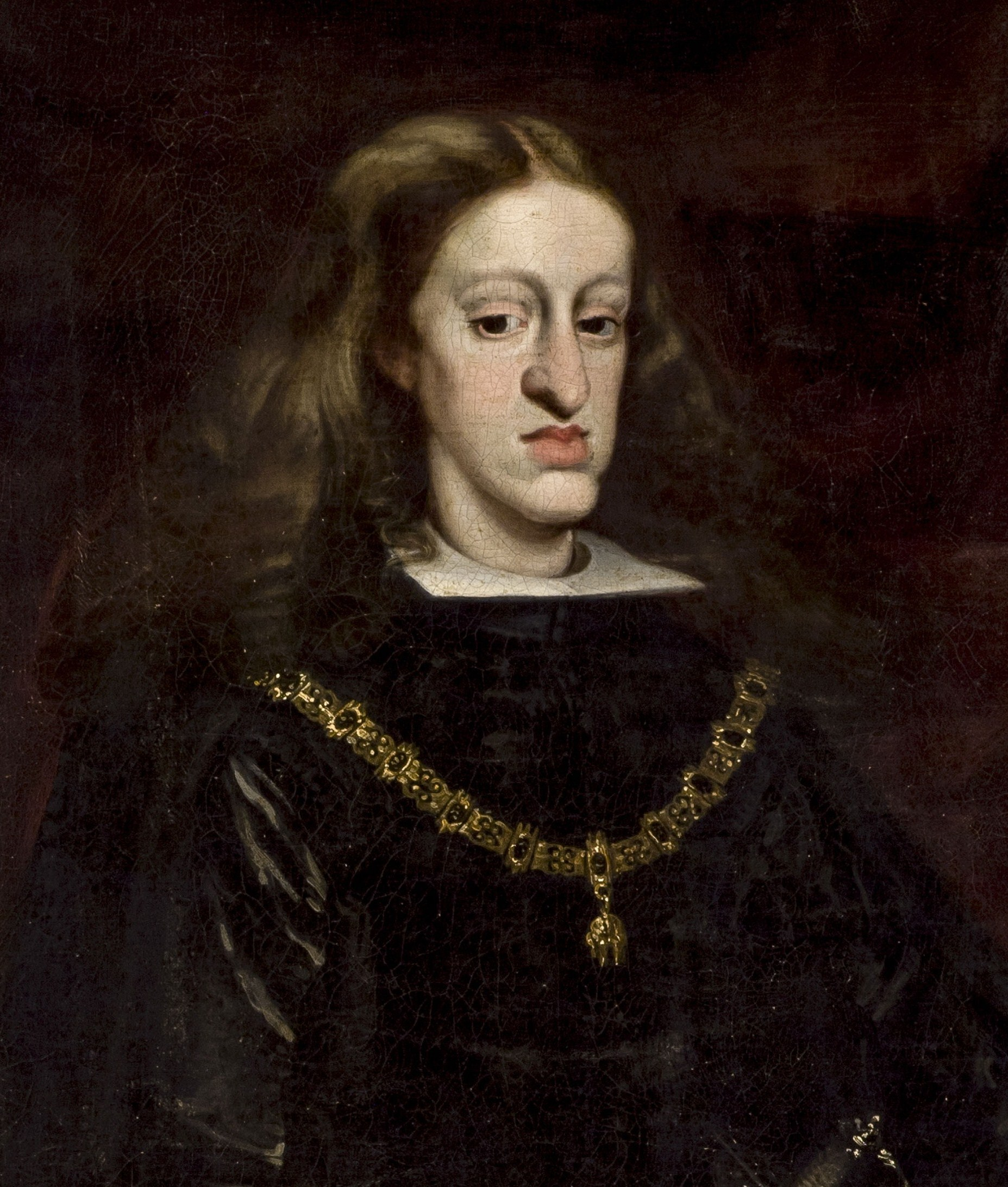
Charles II of Spain c. 1685

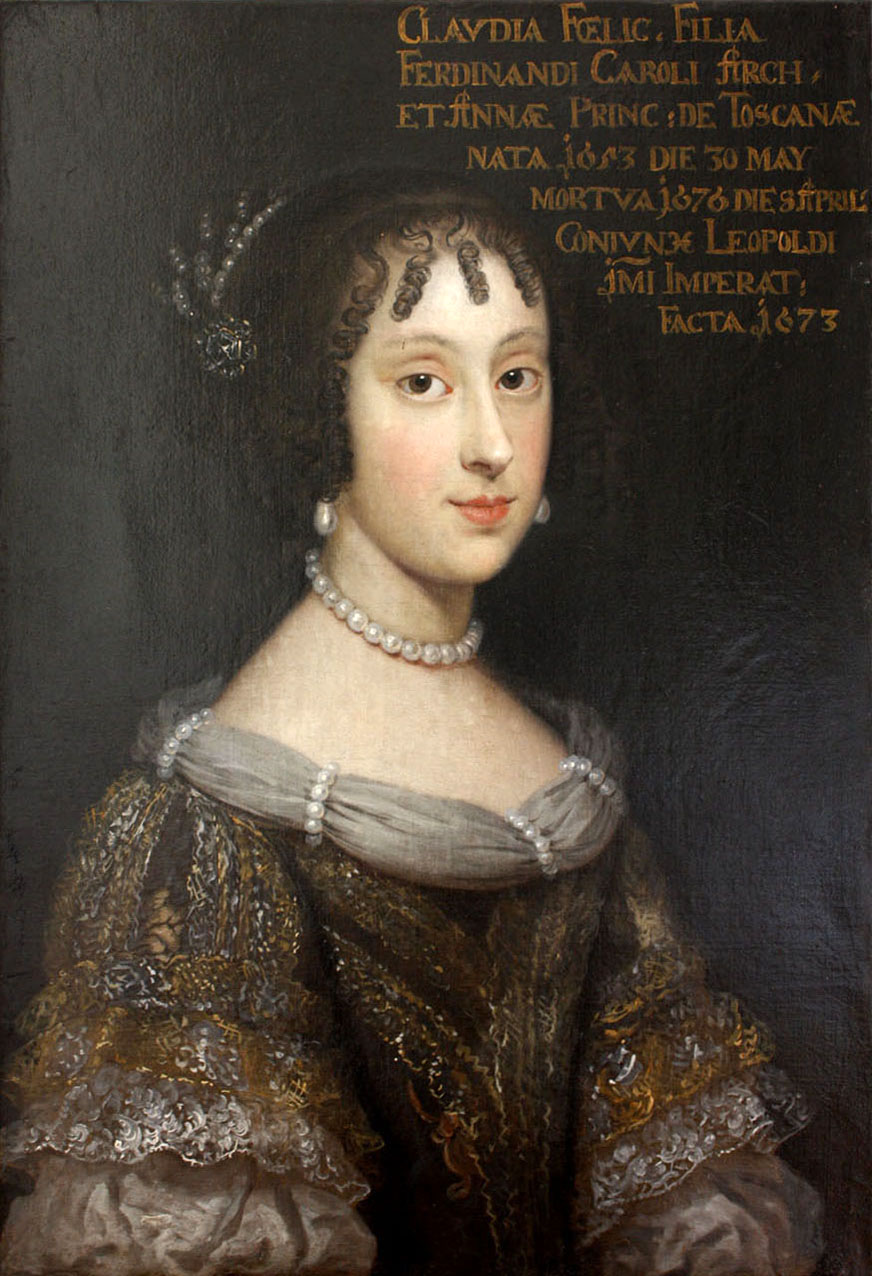
Claudia Felicitas of Austria

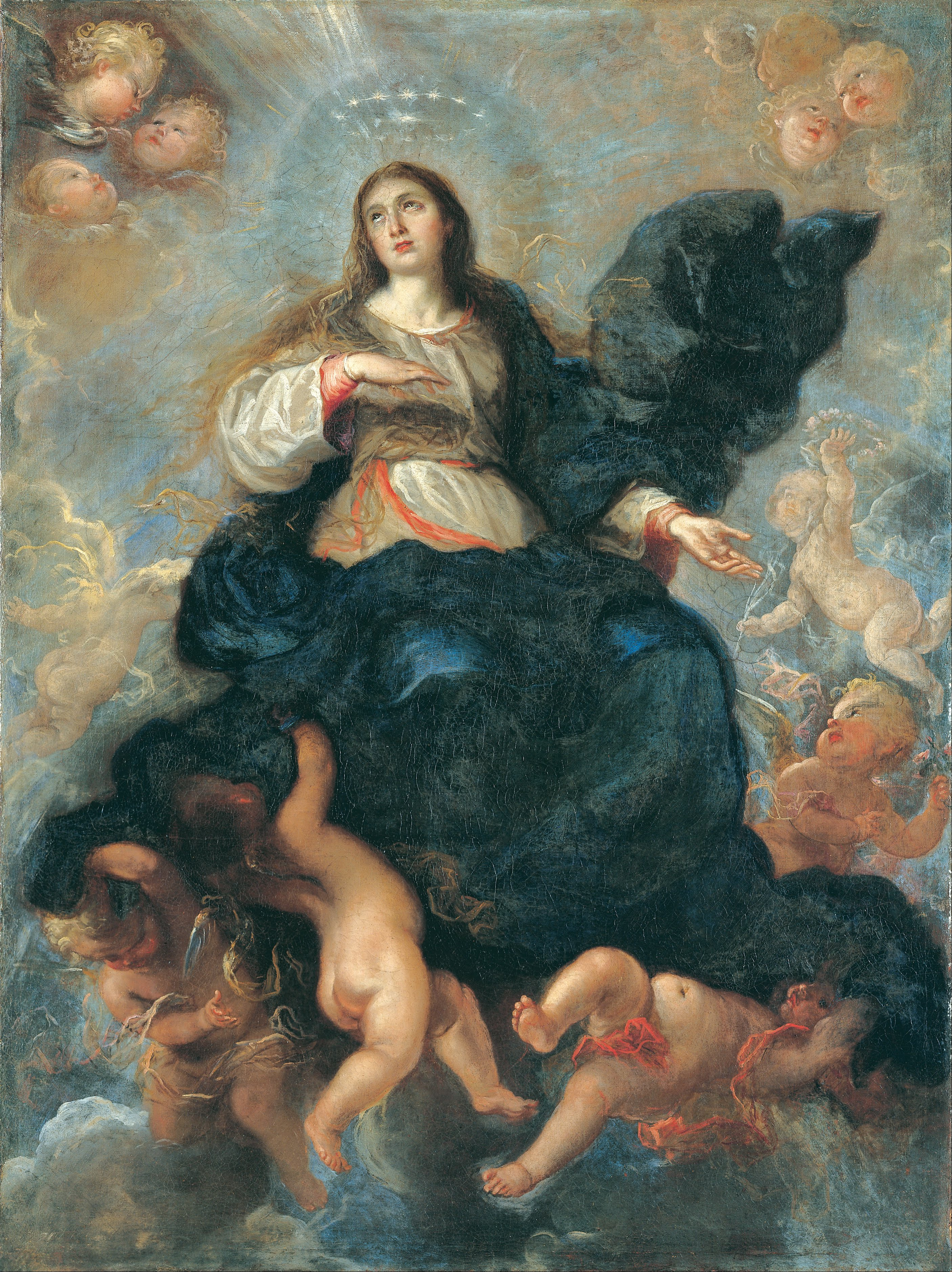
The Assumption of the Virgin

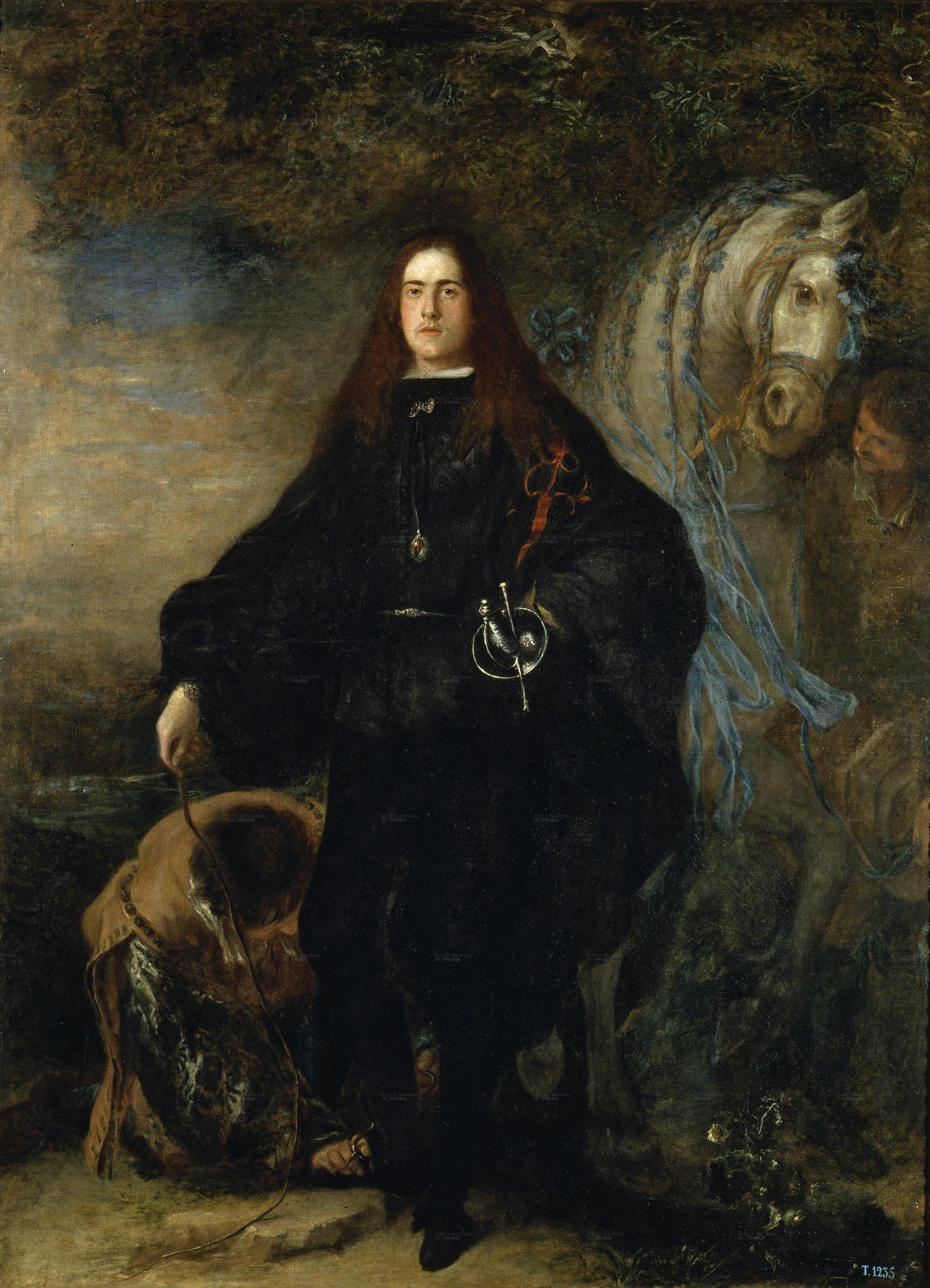
Portrait of the Duke of Pastrana (1649–1693)

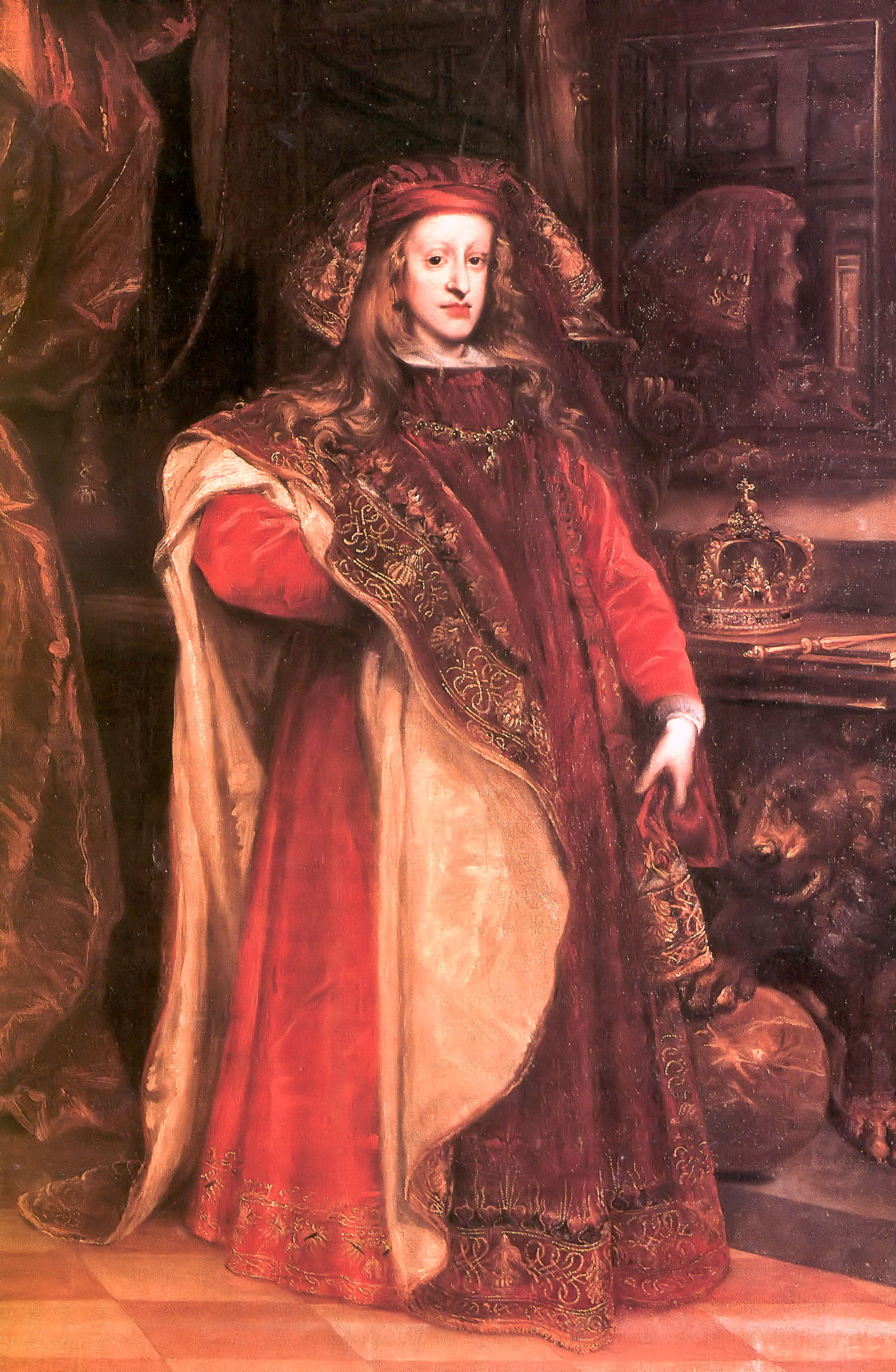
Charles II of Spain c. 1676

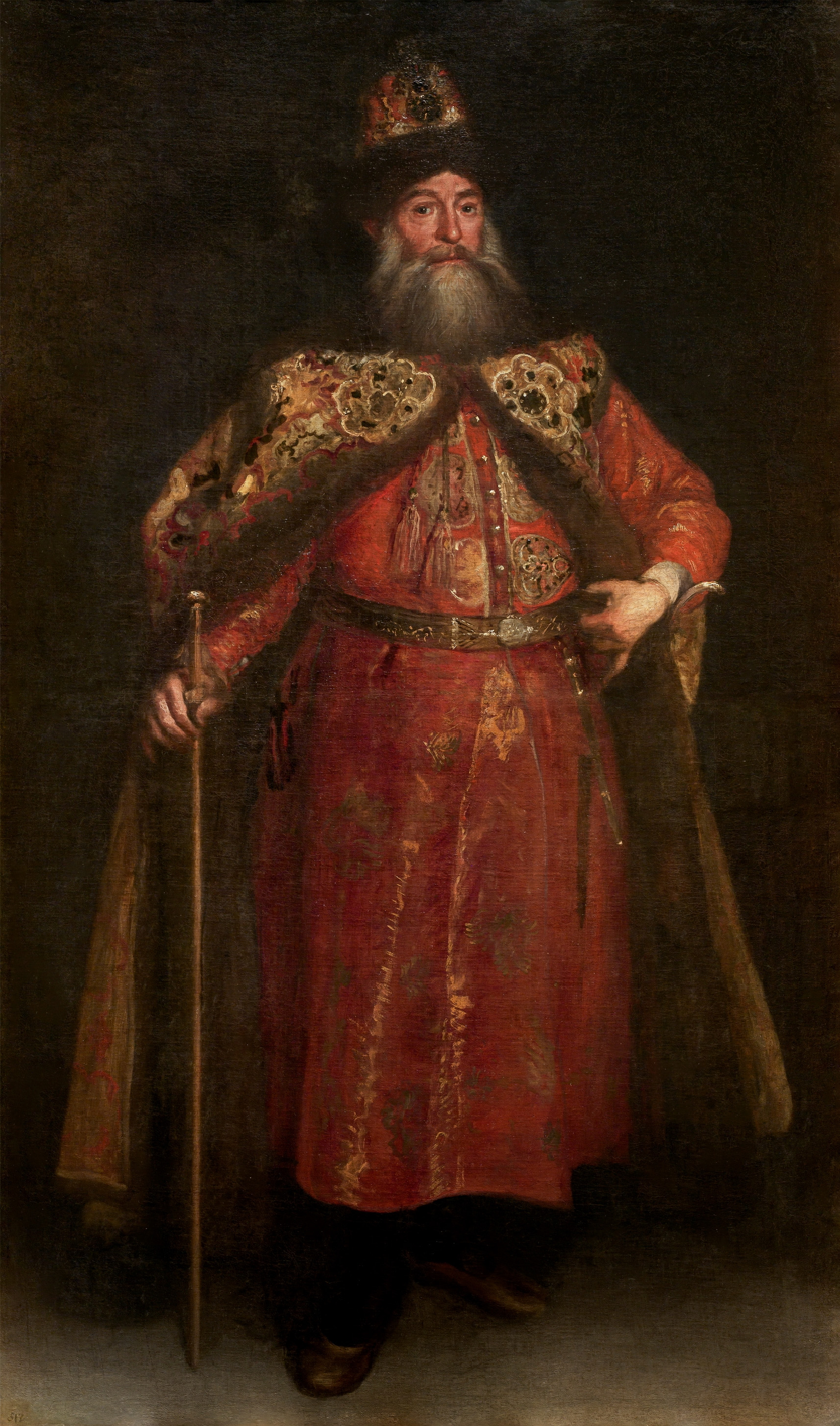
Portrait of Russian ambassador Pyotr Potemkin,
1681–1682

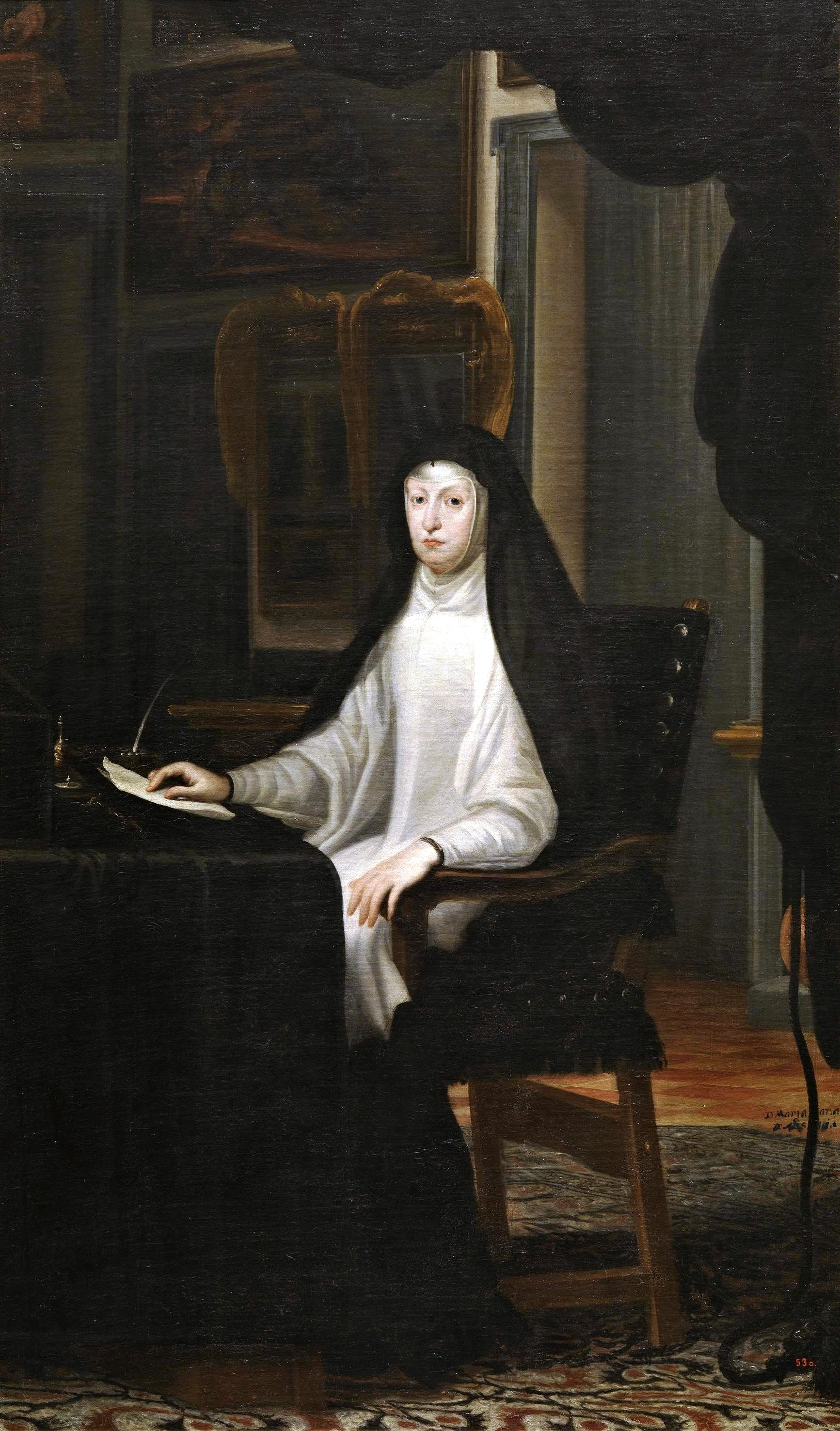
Queen Mariana of Austria

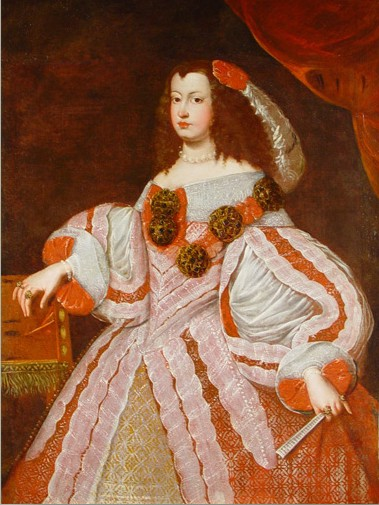
Maria Theresa of Spain

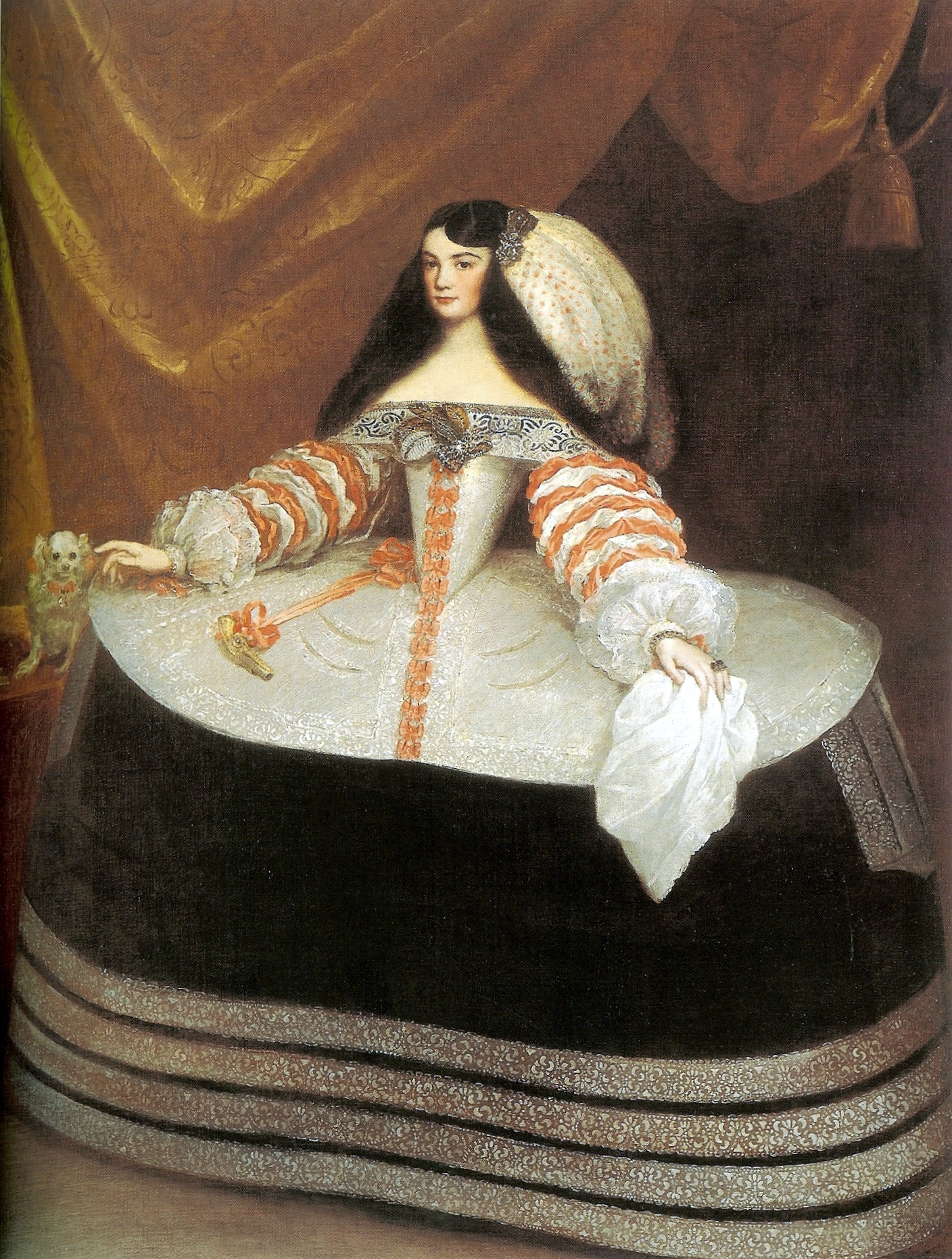
Inés de Zúñiga, Countess of Monterrey

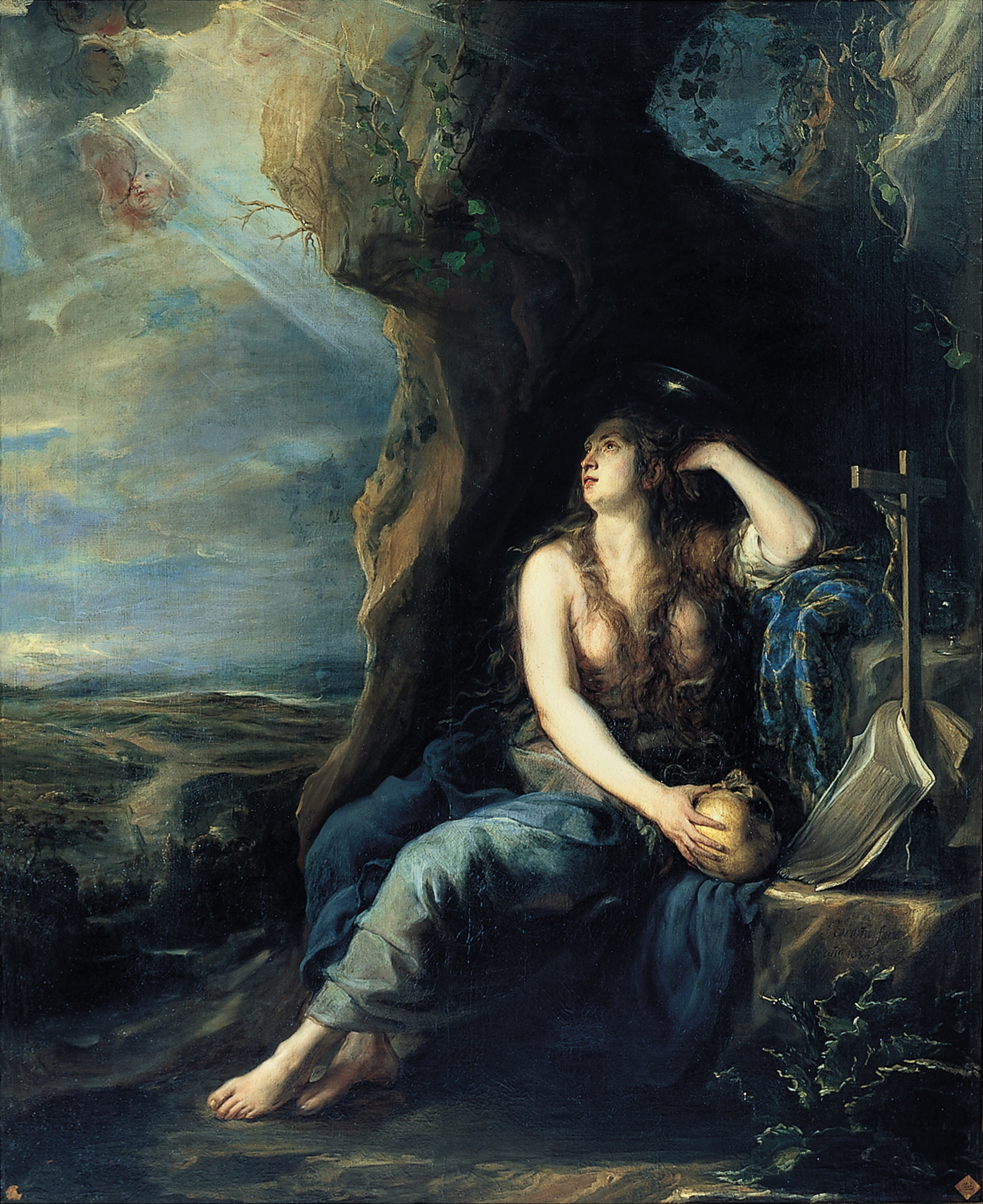
Penitent Mary Magdalene. Real Academia de Bellas Artes de San Fernando. Madrid. Spain.
