= Isaac and Jacob =

Painting by Jusepe de Ribera

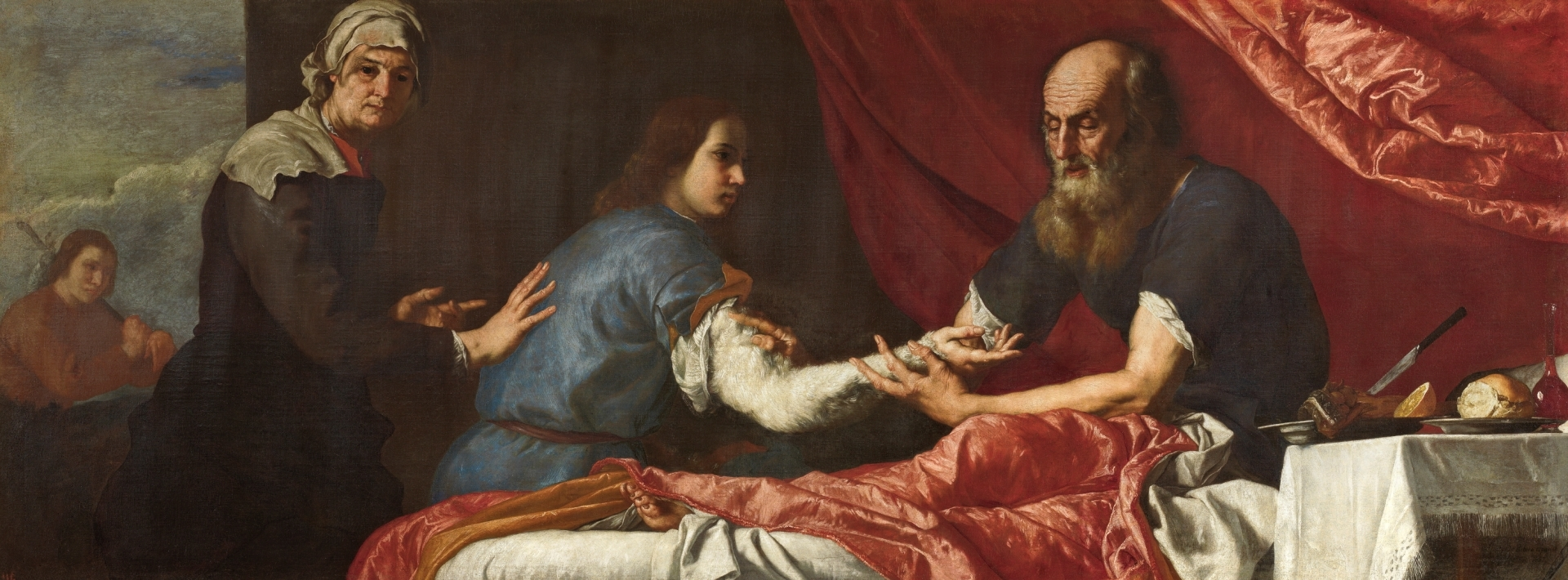
Isaac and Jacob (1637) by Jusepe de Ribera

Isaac and Jacob is an oil on canvas painting by Jusepe de Ribera, executed in 1637, which since 1918 has been in the Prado Museum in Madrid.

== History ==
Nothing is known about who commissioned the painting for the Royal Collections, but in 1734 the work was in the Royal Alcázar of Madrid, possibly in the Hall of Mirrors, from which it had to be moved due to a fire that occurred in that year. It then went to the Royal Palace where it remained until after the War of Independence, when it was taken to the San Fernando Academy to finally move to the Prado Museum in 1854.

== Description and style ==
The painting represents what is described in Genesis (27, 1-29), when Jacob, helped by his mother Rebekah, deceives his blind father Isaac to receive the blessing meant for his older brother, Esau. To carry out the deception, Jacob covers one arm with a sheepskin, imitating the hairy arms of his brother.

In the work, which all critics consider one of Ribera's most mature, we see the half-length characters, with Isaac lying on the bed feeling his arm, Jacob sitting on the bed and the mother, with a Vélazquez inspired look, encouraging her child to cheat. On the left we also see Esau returning from hunting.

Ribera creates an almost theatrical scene where with his chromatic skill and the marvelous use of a vibrant light he manages to make us feel the environment, almost touch the objects and transmit the touch of the fabrics, of the sheepskin and give the faces of the characters an amazing naturalism. Remarkable is the still life to the right of the canvas which, although it was a genre that Ribera hardly practiced, was a sure point of reference for the work on this subject by later painters.

The point of view of the work, whose focal point is considerably low, and the elongated format of the painting, suggests that it was painted to be viewed from below, perhaps positioned as an over-door or over-window.
