= Royal Monastery of La Encarnación =

Royal Monastery of la Encarnación
- Real Monasterio de la Encarnación (Spanish)
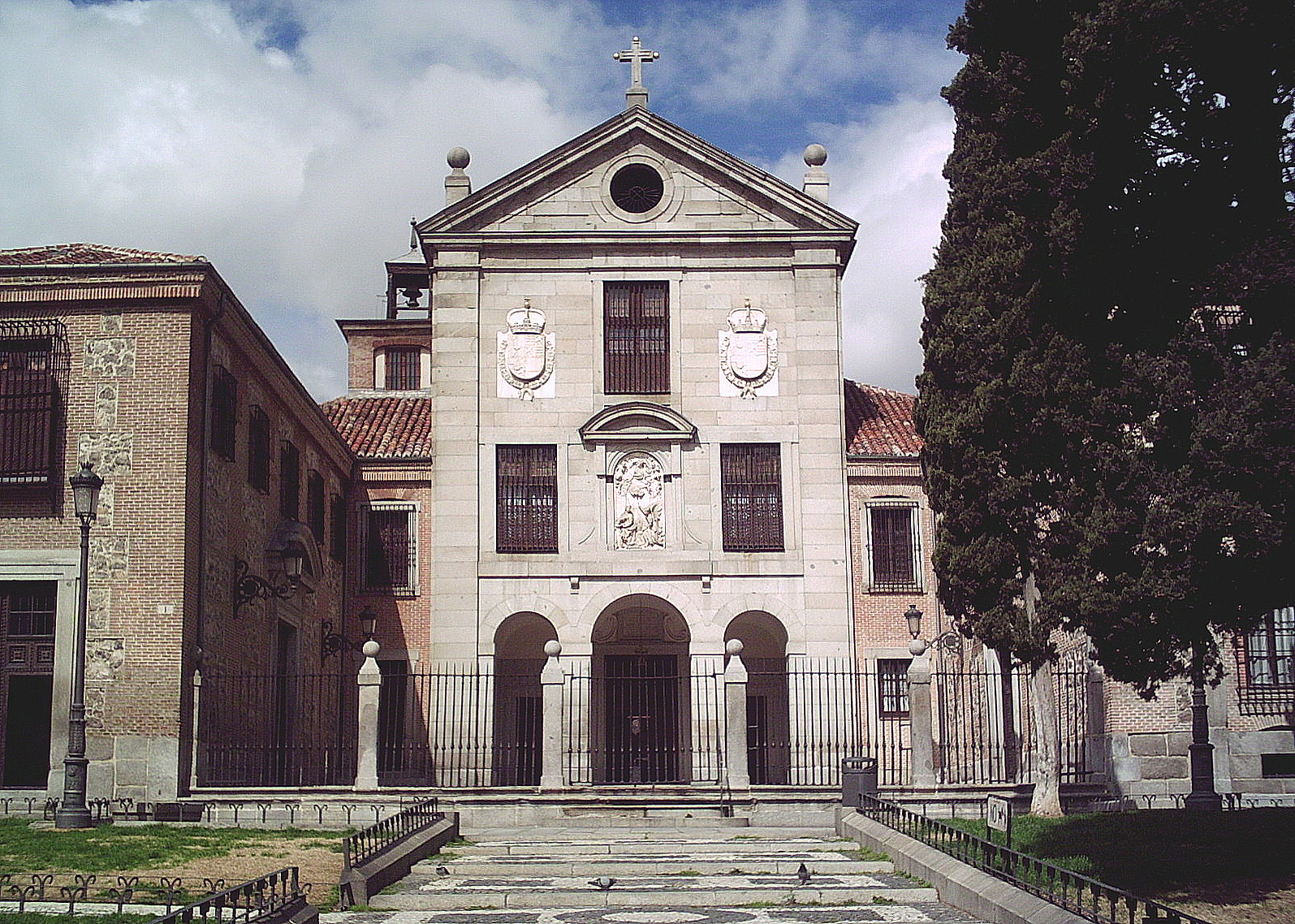

- Location within Spain
- 40.419807°N 3.711438°W
- Location: Madrid, Spain

Spanish Cultural Heritage
- Official name: Real Monasterio de la Encarnación
- Type: Non-movable
- Criteria: Monument
- Designated: 1994
- Reference no.: RI-51-0008767

The Real Monasterio de la Encarnación (Royal Monastery of the Incarnation) is a convent of the order of Recollet Augustines located in Madrid, Spain. The institution mainly interned women from noble families, and was founded by the Queen Margaret of Austria, wife of Philip III, (Note: Esses (1992) states that this convent was founded by Philip III.) and thus was well endowed with wealth. Although it belongs to an enclosed religious order, the building is open to the public under the administration of the Patrimonio Nacional.

== History ==
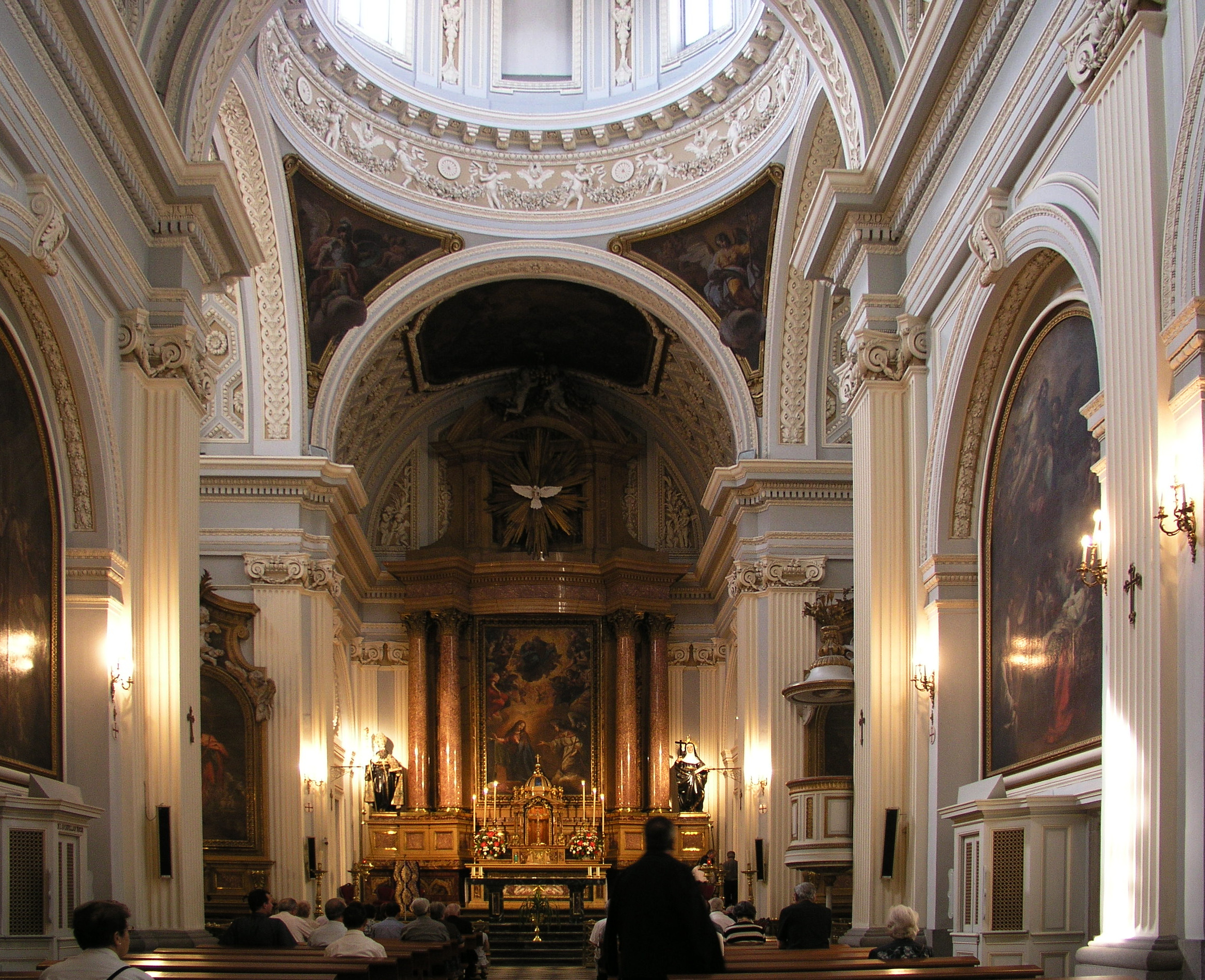
The church

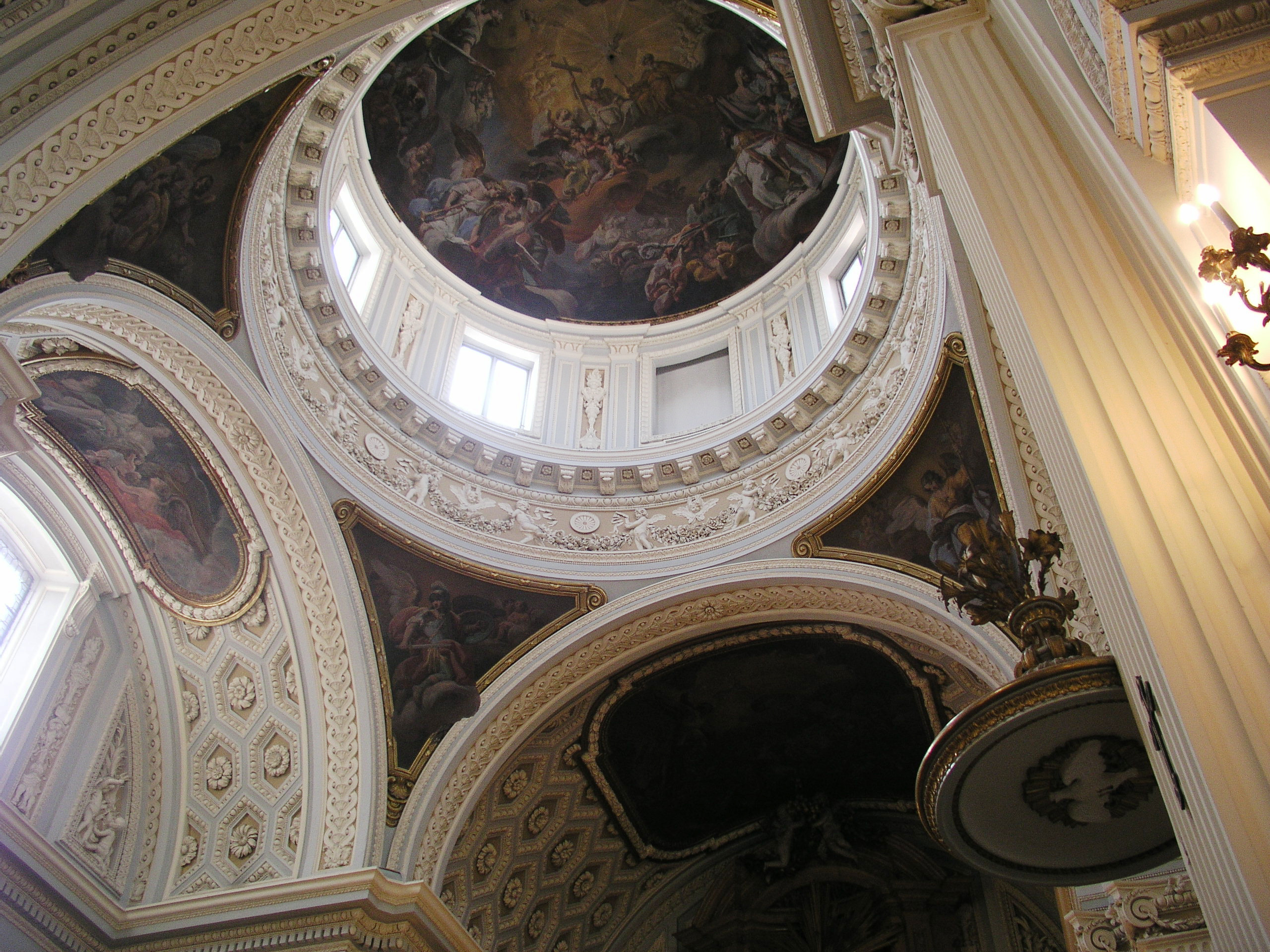
Dome

The impulse for the founding of the monastery by Queen Margaret, and sometimes the nuns are called las Margaritas, was to celebrate her husband's expulsion of the Moriscos, resident Moors. The queen had the prioress of the monastery of discalced nuns of San Agustín in Valladolid, Mother Mariana de San José, accompanied by Francisca de San Ambrosio (sister of the marquesa de Pozas), Catalina de la Encarnación, and Isabel de la Cruz. First lodged in the Convent of Santa Isabel while they awaited the completion, they received donations from the king and queen, including jewels, to finance the monastery. The monastery was built adjacent to the then extant Real Alcázar, and had a passageway to allow the royals direct access. The monastery was inaugurated on 2 July 1616, a few years after the queen had died.

The architect and friar Alberto de la Madre de Dios designed and built the monastery between 1611 and 1616. The facade has a sobriety recalling the style of Juan de Herrera. The monastery, now partly a museum, has a wealth of works of art and relics including tubes with the blood of St. Januarius and of St. Pantaleon.

During the reign of Charles IV of Spain, his prime minister, Manuel Godoy, would attend daily mass here, walking from his nearby Palace of Marqués de Grimaldi. When Joseph Bonaparte entered Madrid as king, a hanged cat was found on the monastery gate with the writing: Si no lías pronto el hato,/ te verás como este gato. ("If you don't leave this town soon/ you'll end up like this cat"). In the 19th century, the composer Lorenzo Román Nielfa was professor of music here. The monastery was open to the public in 1965.

The interior of the church was redecorated in the 18th century, including frescoes in the ceiling of the main chapel by Francisco Bayeu. In the center of the retable of the main altar is an Annunciation by Vincenzo Carducci. On the sides of the altar are the sculptures of Augustine of Hippo and his mother Saint Monica by Gregorio Fernández. The tabernacle was completed by Ventura Rodríguez. The small statues of the Doctors of the Church and the bas-relief of the Savior are by Isidro Carnicero.

The monastery features paintings and sculptures by Luca Giordano, Juan van der Hamen, Pedro de Mena, José de Mora (Mater Dolorosa), and Gregorio Fernández (Dead Christ and Christ at the column).
