= José Jiménez Donoso =

Spanish painter

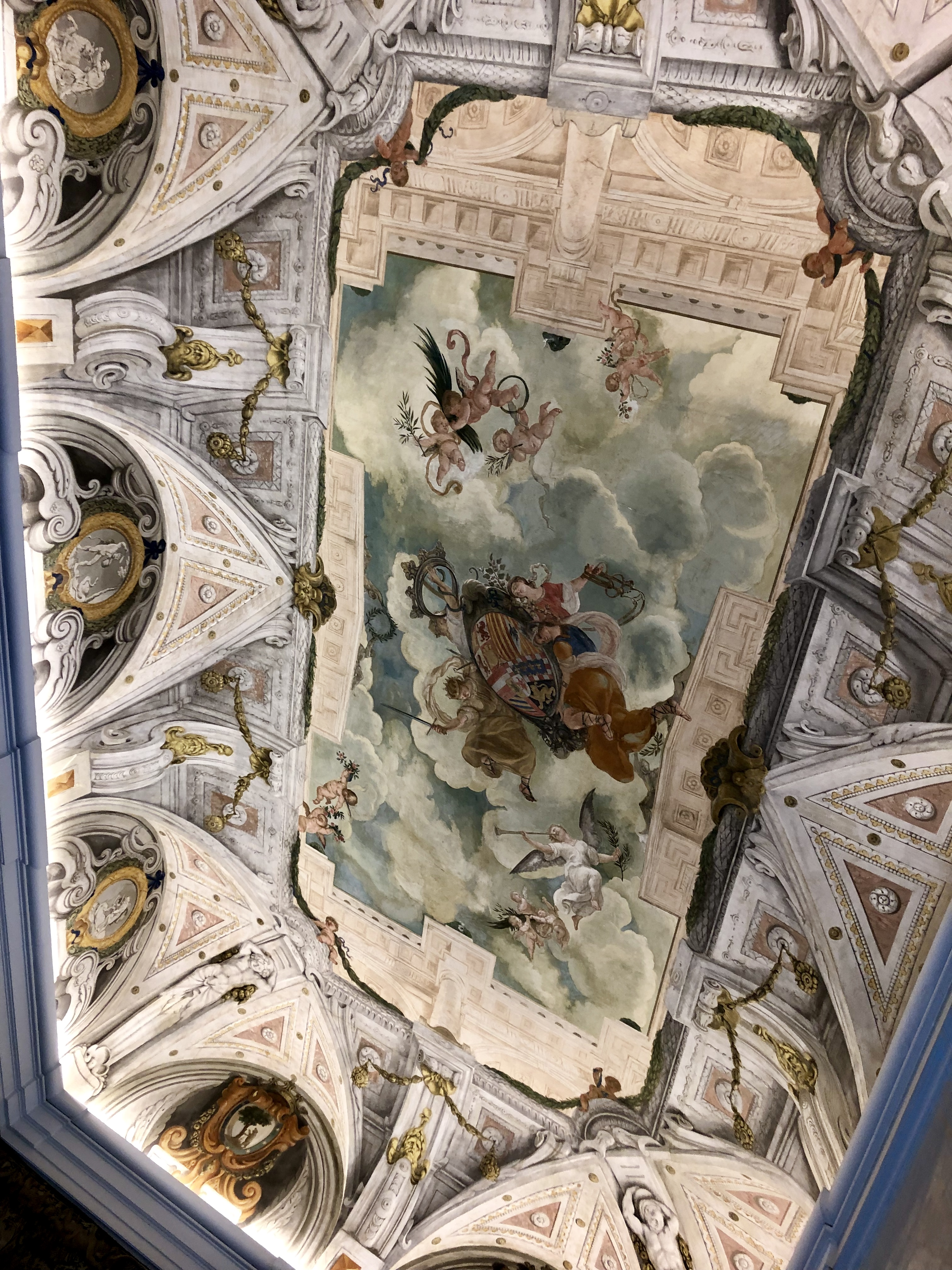
Ceiling in the Royal Salon at the Casa de la Panadería

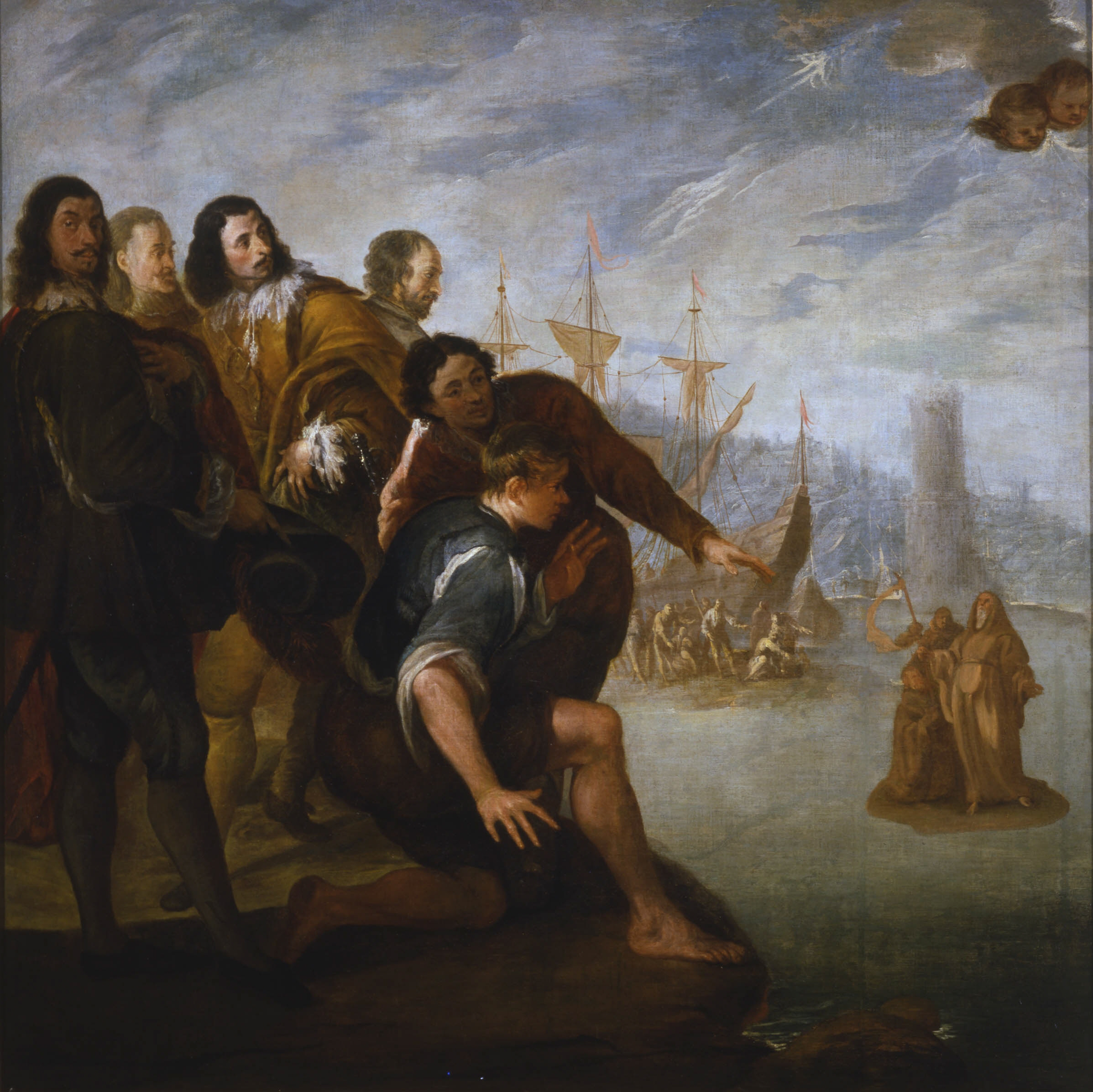
Saint Francis of Paola crossing the Strait of Messina on his cloak

José Jiménez Donoso (c.1632, Consuegra – 14 September 1690, Madrid) was a Spanish Baroque architect and painter. He decorated many of his own buildings, using the Italian technique of quadratura.

== Life and work ==
He learned the rudiments of art from his father, the painter Antonio Jiménez Donoso, and continued his studies in Madrid with Francisco Fernández, who was a follower of Vicente Carducho. Around 1649, he moved to Rome, where he remained for seven years, learning how to paint frescoes. He also studied architecture, apparently coming under the influence of Francesco Borromini.

When he returned to Madrid, he completed his studies at the school operated by Juan Carreño de Miranda. After that, he attempted to obtain a position as court painter to King Charles II, but was unsuccessful. He remained bitter over this failure, although he later became an official painter at Toledo Cathedral. His mastery of Italian techniques also served to provide him with numerous commissions.

He was interred in the Iglesia de San Luis, which he had designed.

Most of his architectural work has, however, disappeared. Some have been preserved in photographs and drawings, such as portions of Convento de Santo Tomás and the Iglesia de San Luis obispo, which was destroyed during the Spanish Civil War. The Casa de la Panadería, which he helped decorate after a fire in 1672, is still standing, despite another fire in 1790.

His paintings are mostly frescoes in the Italian style. Prior to his time, most churches were largely painted white, with some geometric designs, Islamic style. He and Claudio Coello were among the first group to do Biblical scenes in the chapels and vaults. Again, much of this was destroyed during the Civil War. Also lost are works done for the private chamber of Queen Marie Louise d’Orléans at the Royal Alcázar. He was one of the artists who participated in decorating the Miracle Chapel at the Convent of Las Descalzas Reales, but it is difficult to pinpoint his contributions to the project. Several altarpieces have survived, as well as three oil paintings, depicting scenes from the life of Saint Francis of Paola. His only known portrait is of Juan José de Austria, now at the Biblioteca Museu Víctor Balaguer.

== Sources ==
- A. Rodríguez and G. de Ceballos: Biography from the Gran Enciclopedia Rialp
- Antonio Palomino, El Parnaso español, Madrid 1724
- George Kubler, Arquitectura de los siglos XVII y XVIII, Editorial Plus-Ultra, 1957
- Fernando Chueca Goitía, Madrid y los sitios reales, Editorial Seix Barral, 1958
- Alfonso E. Pérez-Sánchez, Pintura barroca en España 1600-1750, Ediciones Cátedra, 1992 ISBN 84-376-0994-1
