= Plaza Mayor, Madrid =

Square in Madrid, Spain

Plaza Mayor of Madrid
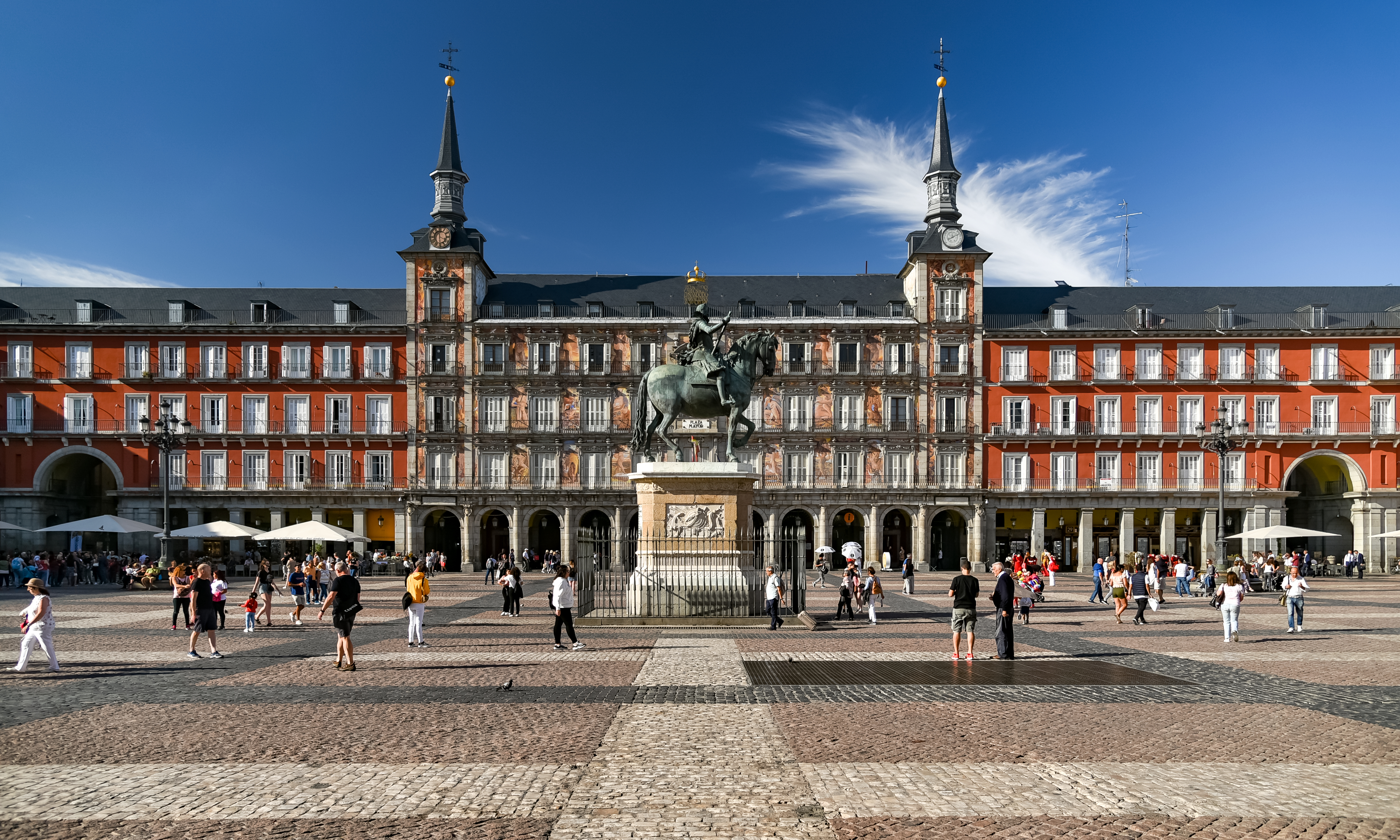
- Plaza Mayor with the Casa de la Panadería behind the central statue of Philip III

- Location within Madrid
- 40.415364°N 3.707391°W
- Location: Madrid, Spain

Spanish Cultural Heritage
- Official name: Plaza Mayor de Madrid
- Type: Non-movable
- Criteria: Monument
- Designated: 1985
- Reference no.: RI-51-0005006

The Plaza Mayor (English: Main Square) is the principal public square in the heart of Madrid, the capital of Spain. It was once the centre of Old Madrid. It was first built (1580–1619) during the reign of Philip III. Only a few blocks away is another famous plaza, the Puerta del Sol.

The Plaza Mayor is rectangular in shape and is noted for the uniformity of its surrounding architecture. The square measures 129 metres (423 ft) by 94 metres (308 ft). A total of 237 balconies overlook the square from the residential buildings that enclose it. Access is provided by ten entrances and nine gates, each named according to their historical or geographical significance. The entrances are: 7 de Julio, Arco de Triunfo, and Felipe III to the north; Sal, Zaragoza, and Gerona to the east; Botoneras, Toledo, and Cuchilleros to the south; and Ciudad Rodrigo to the west.

== Name ==
The name of the plaza has changed over time. It has been known as Plaza del Arrabal, Plaza de la Constitución, Plaza Real, Plaza de la República and now Plaza Mayor. These changes of name reflect events in Spanish history.

Plaza del Arrabal was the original name of the square. The Plaza del Arrabal was once the site of the most popular marketplace until the end of the 15th century. Following the Constitution of 1812, all major plazas in Spain were renamed Plaza de la Constitución. It also held this name from 1820 to 1823, from 1833 to 1835, from 1840 to 1843, and from 1876 to 1922. When the Borbón king was restored in 1814, it became known as the Plaza Real. In 1873, the name changed to Plaza de la República. At the end of the Spanish Civil War the plaza received its present name of Plaza Mayor.

== History ==
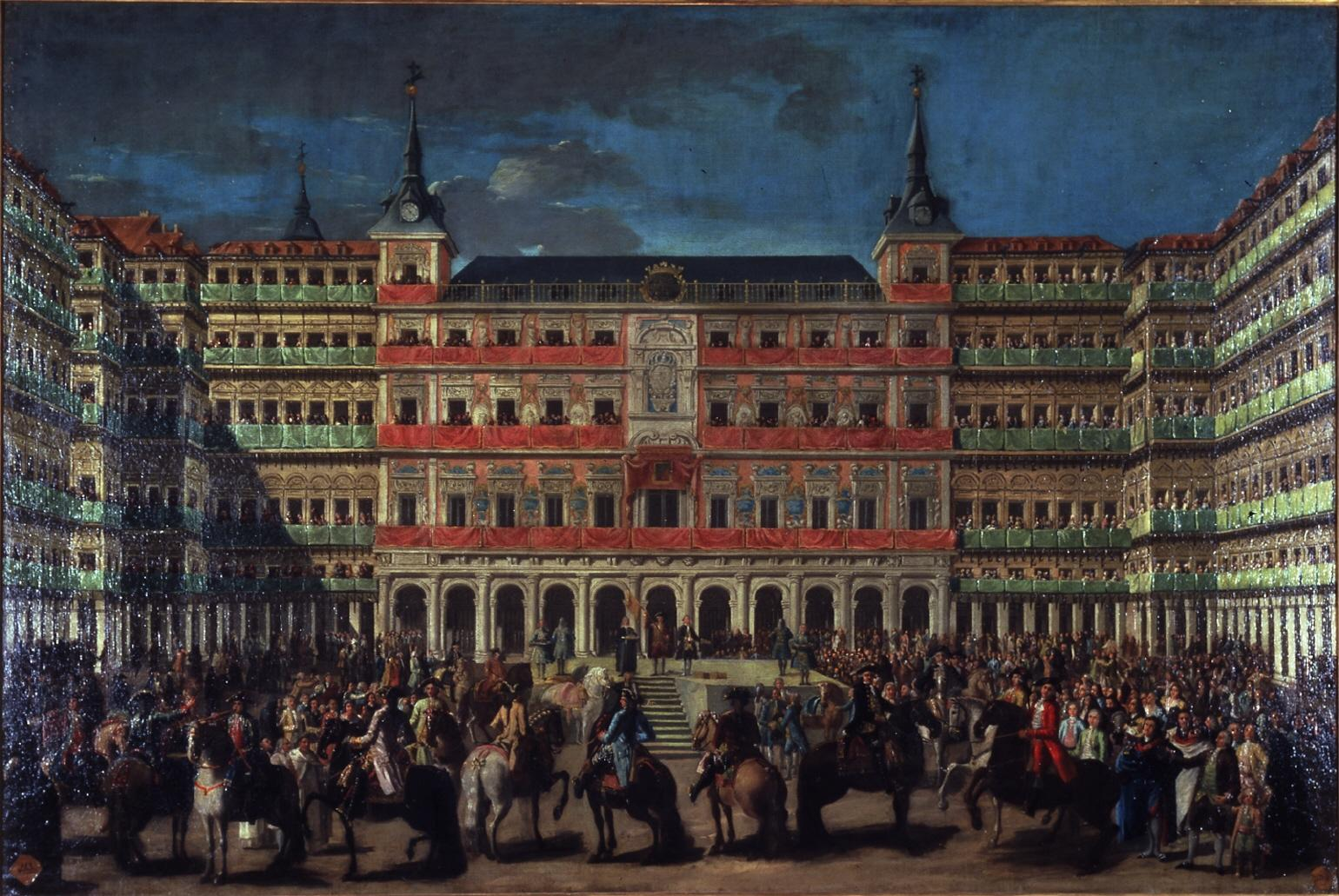
Decoration of the Plaza Mayor on the occasion of the entry of Charles III into Madrid. Oil painting of Lorenzo Quirós (1760). Royal Academy of Fine Arts of San Fernando.

The Plaza Mayor of Madrid traces its origins to the 15th century, when it was known as the Plaza del Arrabal and served as the town’s main marketplace. In 1561, the site came under the jurisdiction of the city of Madrid. During the reign of Philip II, the architect Juan de Herrera was commissioned to redesign the area in the Classical style. However, construction did not begin until 1617, under Philip III, when Juan Gómez de Mora undertook the project. The Plaza was completed in 1619.

Throughout its history, the Plaza Mayor has experienced three major fires. The first occurred in 1631, after which Gómez de Mora led the reconstruction. A second fire took place in 1670, with Tomás Román overseeing the restoration. On June 30, 1680, Plaza Mayor was the site of a major auto-da-fé, during which 117 people were sentenced by the Spanish Inquisition before a large public audience. Twenty-one were condemned to death by burning. Over half of the accused, including most of those executed, were conversos—Christians of Jewish descent—charged with "Judaizing."

The square's third, and most devastating fire occurred in 1790, destroying nearly a third of the square. The subsequent reconstruction was directed by Juan de Villanueva, whose design largely defines the Plaza’s present appearance. Villanueva reduced the height of the surrounding buildings from five to three stories enclosed the corners, and added large entrance archways. After his death, the work was completed by Antonio López Aguado and Custodio Moreno in 1854.

In 1880, the Casa de la Panadería was restored by Joaquín María de la Vega. The Casa de la Panadería is the piece of the façade framed by two towers. It has been used for many different purposes in history. Its name originates from its original use of the main city bakery.

In 1921 the farmhouse was reformed, and then again in 1935 by Fernando García de Mercadal. In 1960s, the plaza was closed to road traffic and underground parking was added below the plaza. The last of the changes to the Plaza Mayor, made in 1992, consisted of mural decoration, the work of Carlos Franco, of the Casa de la Panadería, which represents mythological figures such as the goddess Cibeles.

== Statue ==
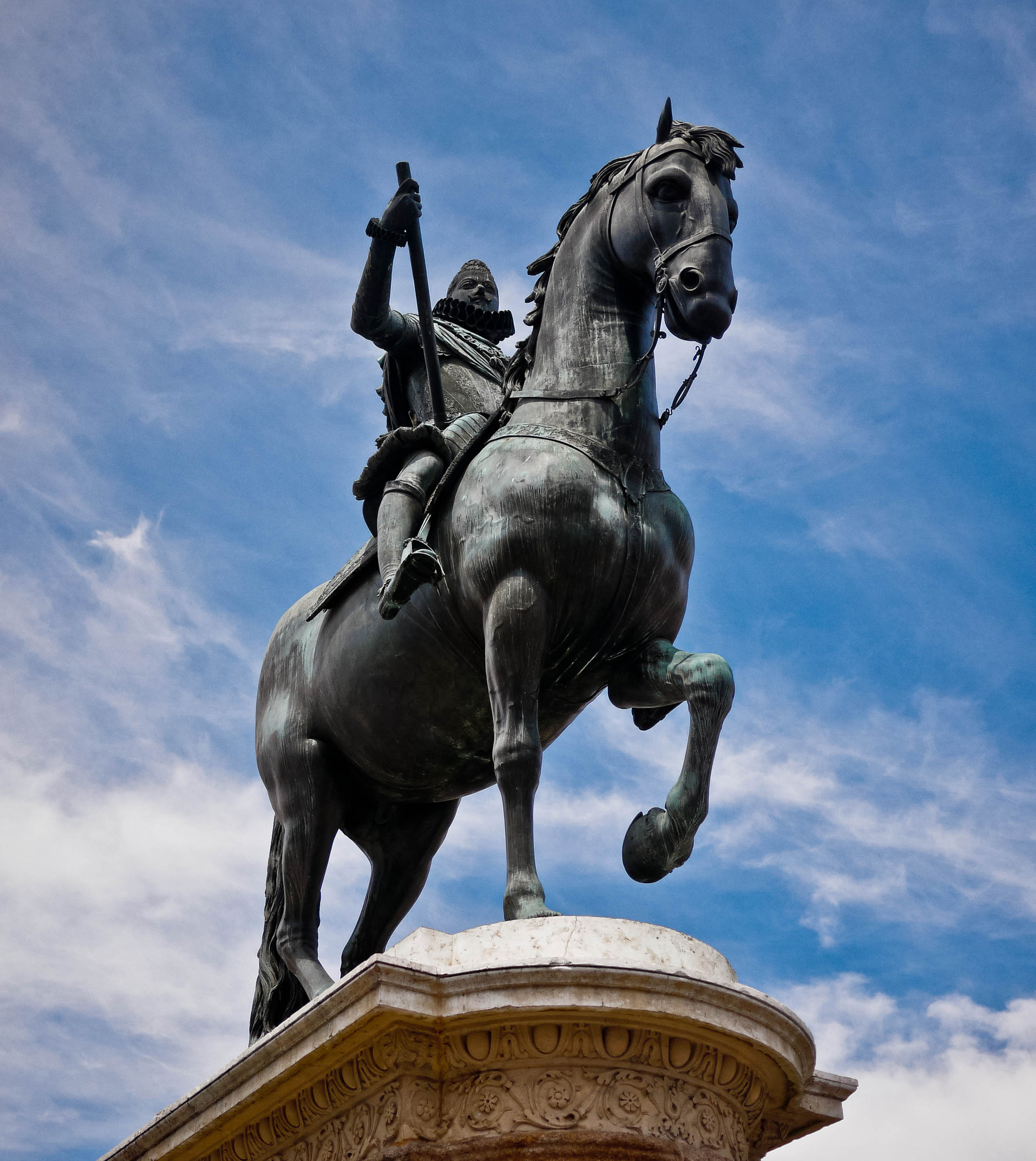
Statue of Phillip III from 1616

There is a bronze equestrian statue of King Philip III at the center of the square, created in 1616 by Giambologna and Pietro Tacca, who were in the employ of the Medici family of Florence. The statue was a gift from Cosimo II de' Medici, who was Grand Duke of Tuscany, and was originally displayed in the Casa de Campo. It was moved to become the centre piece of the Plaza Mayor in 1848, at the instruction of Queen Isabel II.

During the early years of the Franco regime, and like many statues with royal connections, the statue of Phillip III was pulled from its stone pedestal and damaged. It was repaired and restored to its position in the 1950s.

== Usage ==
Today, the Plaza Mayor is a major tourist spot, but is also celebrated by the citizens of Madrid and has become a piece of Spanish culture. Next to the Plaza Mayor at Arco de Cuchilleros Street is Sobrino de Botín, the oldest restaurant in the world.

Throughout its history, the Plaza Mayor has served as the site of numerous public events, including markets, bullfights, soccer games, and public executions. In the present day, it hosts the annual Christmas market, as well as a stamp and coin collectors’ market held on Sundays and public holidays in the morning.

== Gallery ==
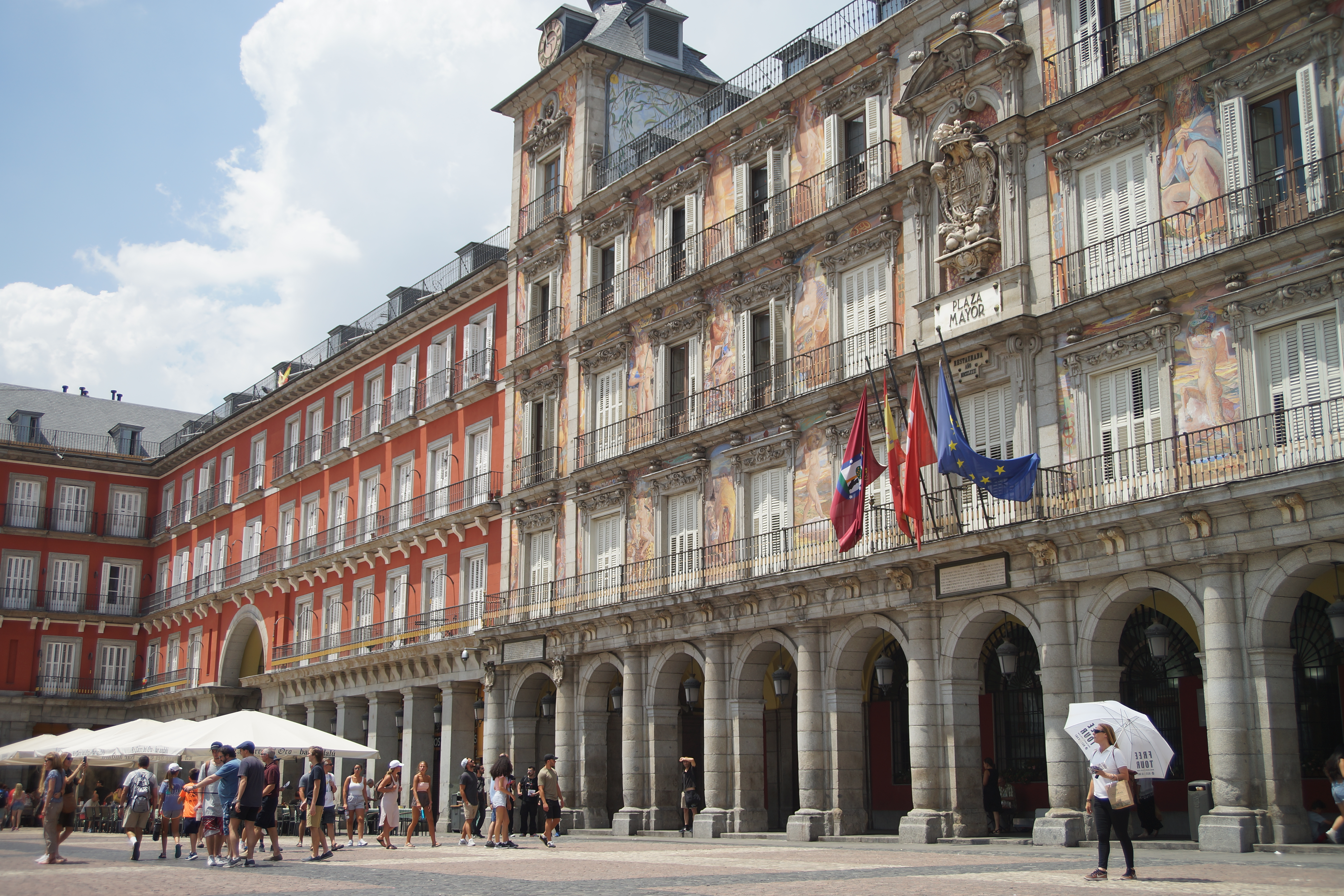
Plaza Mayor with the Casa de la Panadería to the right

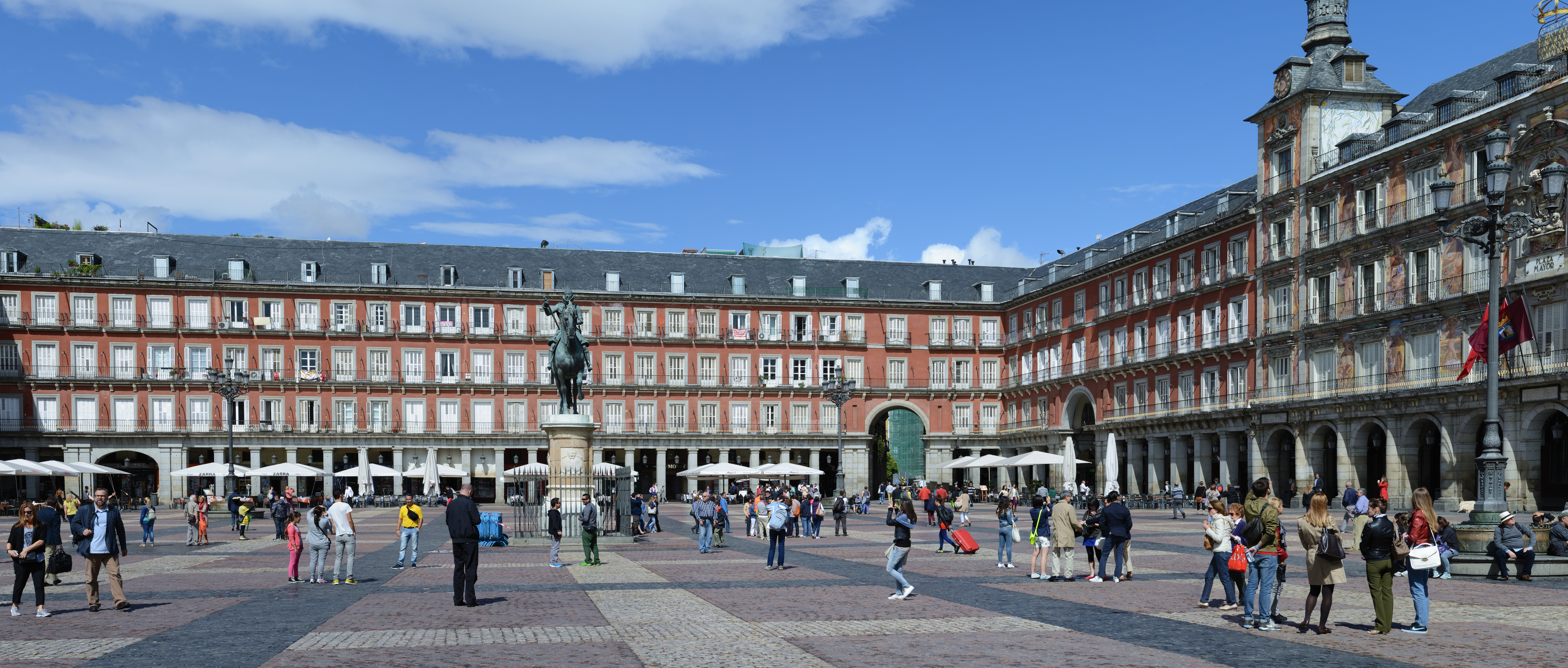
Madrid, Plaza Mayor

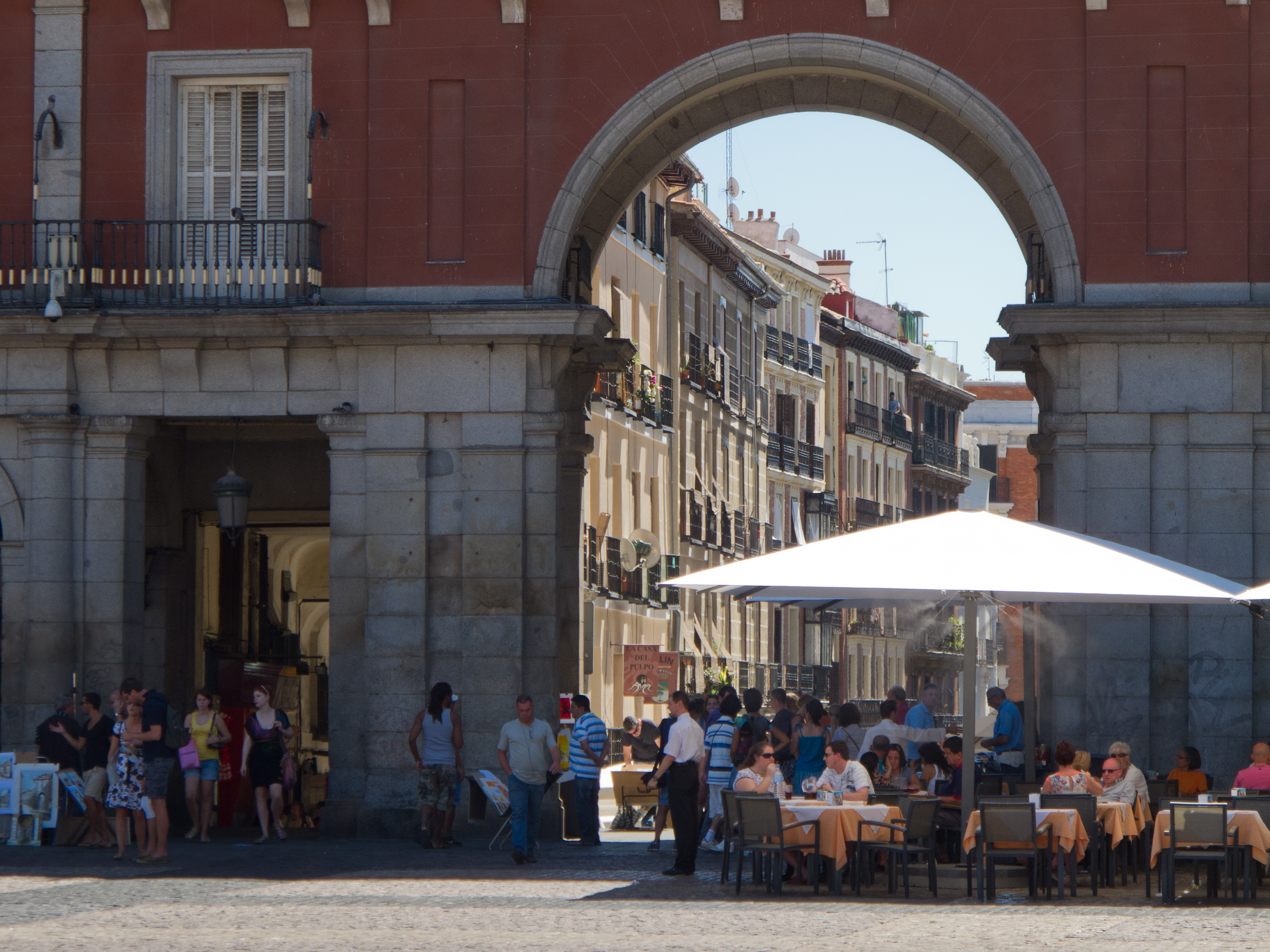
Plaza Mayor de Madrid toward Toledo street

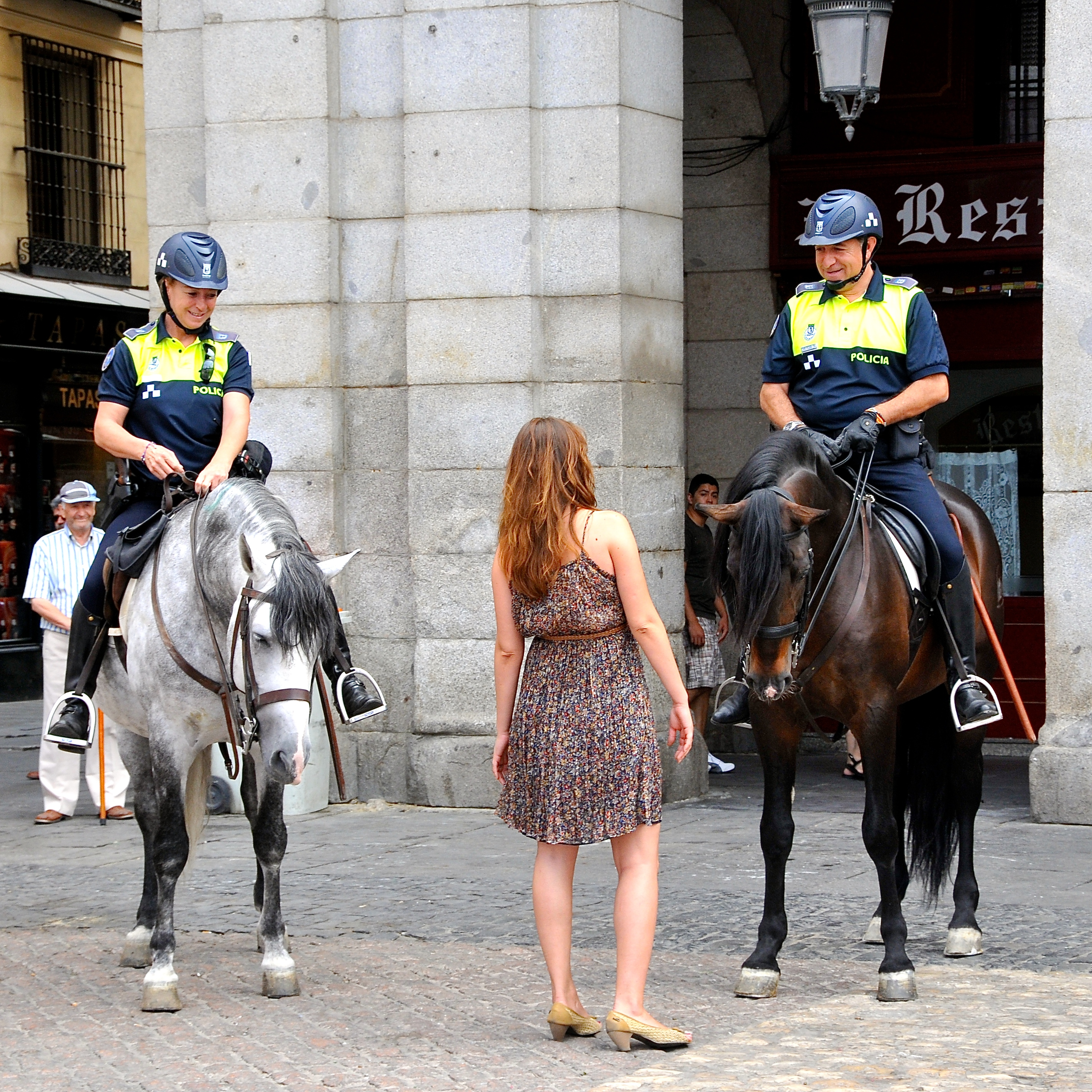
Police horses at the square

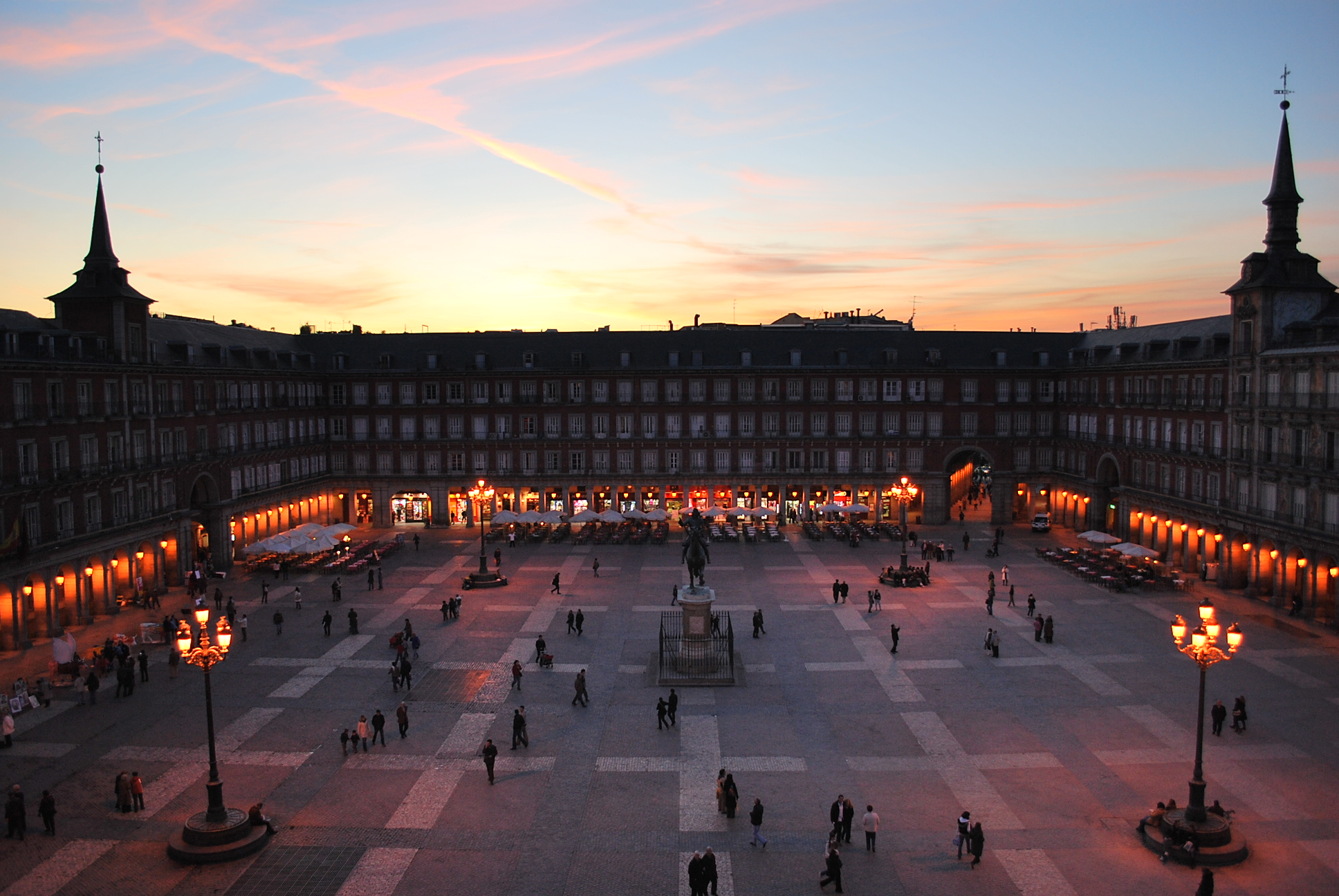
Sunrise at February 2008

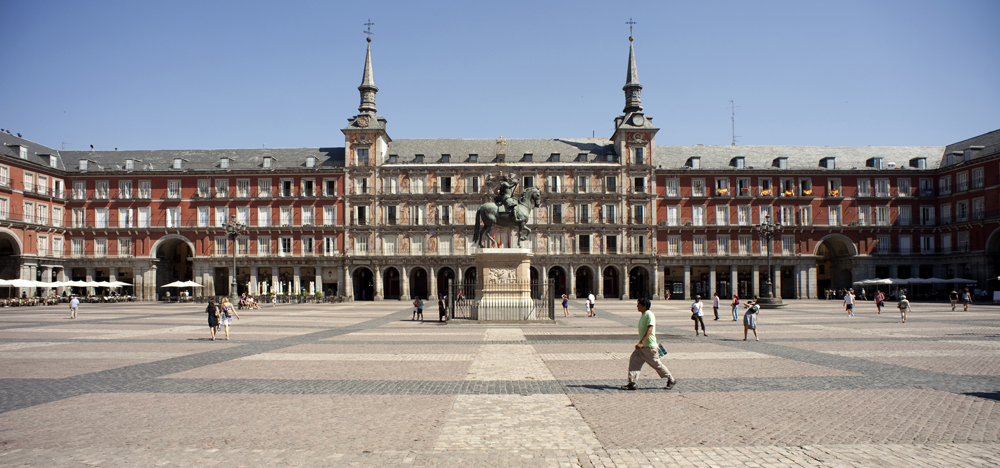
Madrid, Plaza Mayor

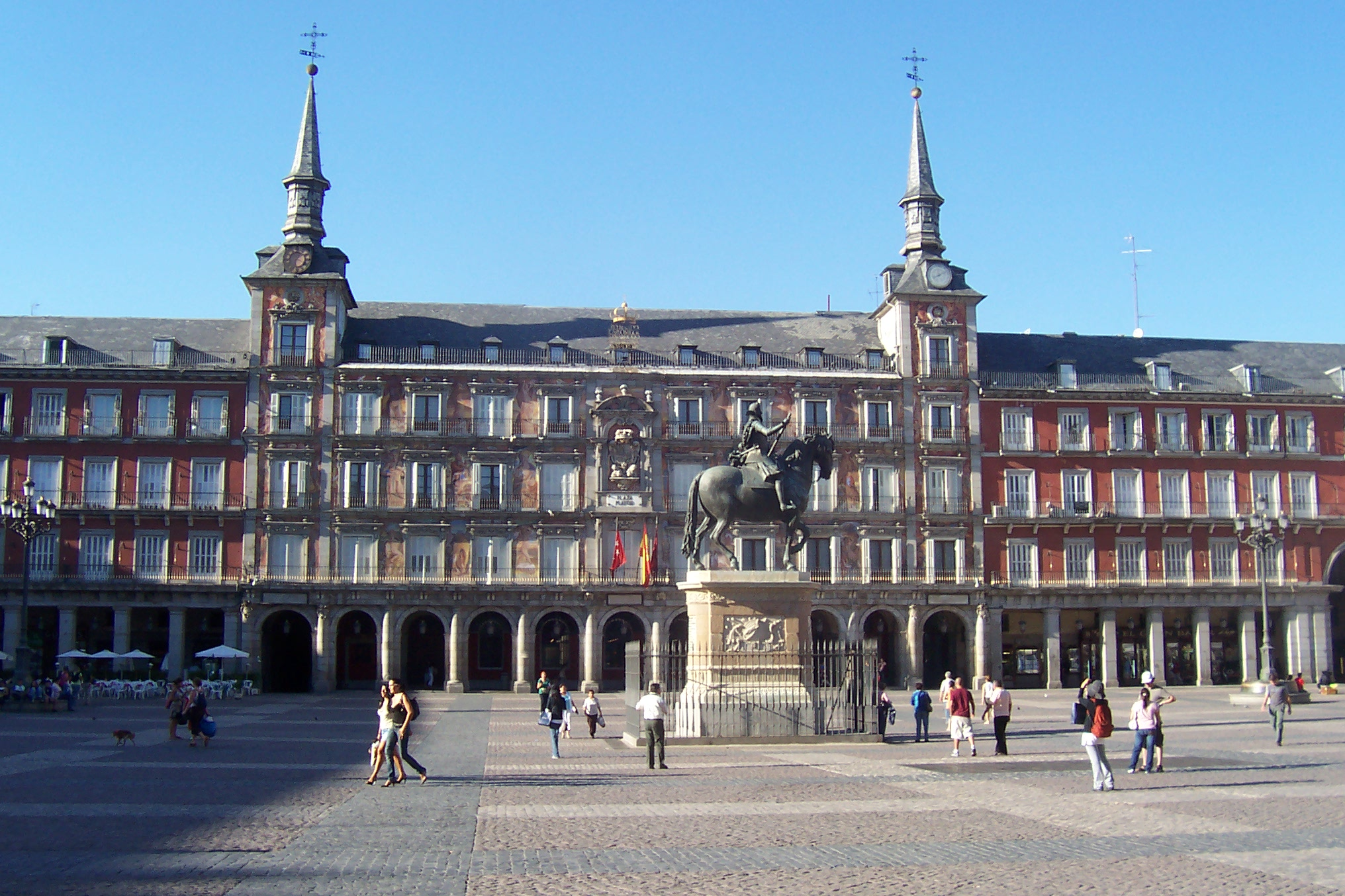
Madrid, Plaza Mayor

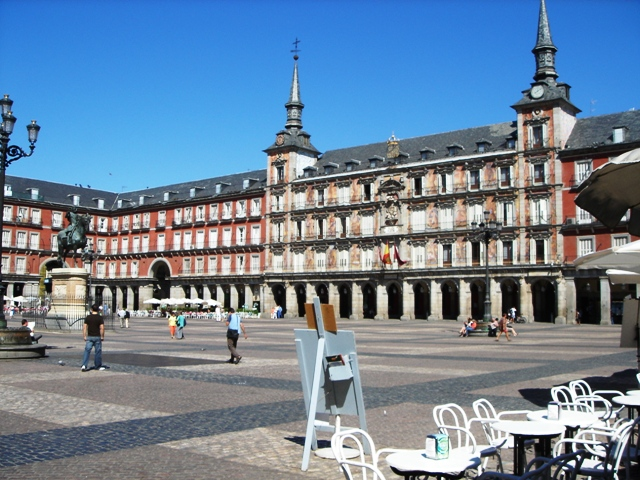
Madrid, Plaza Mayor

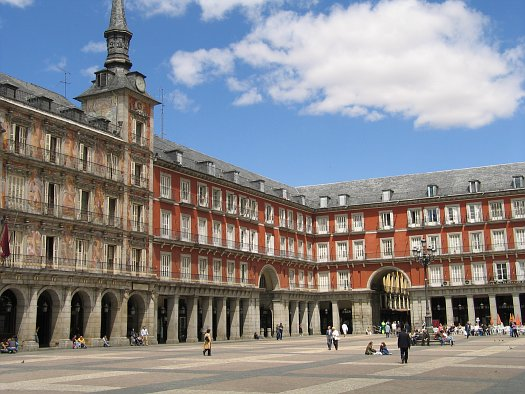
Plaza Mayor with the Casa de la Panadería to the left

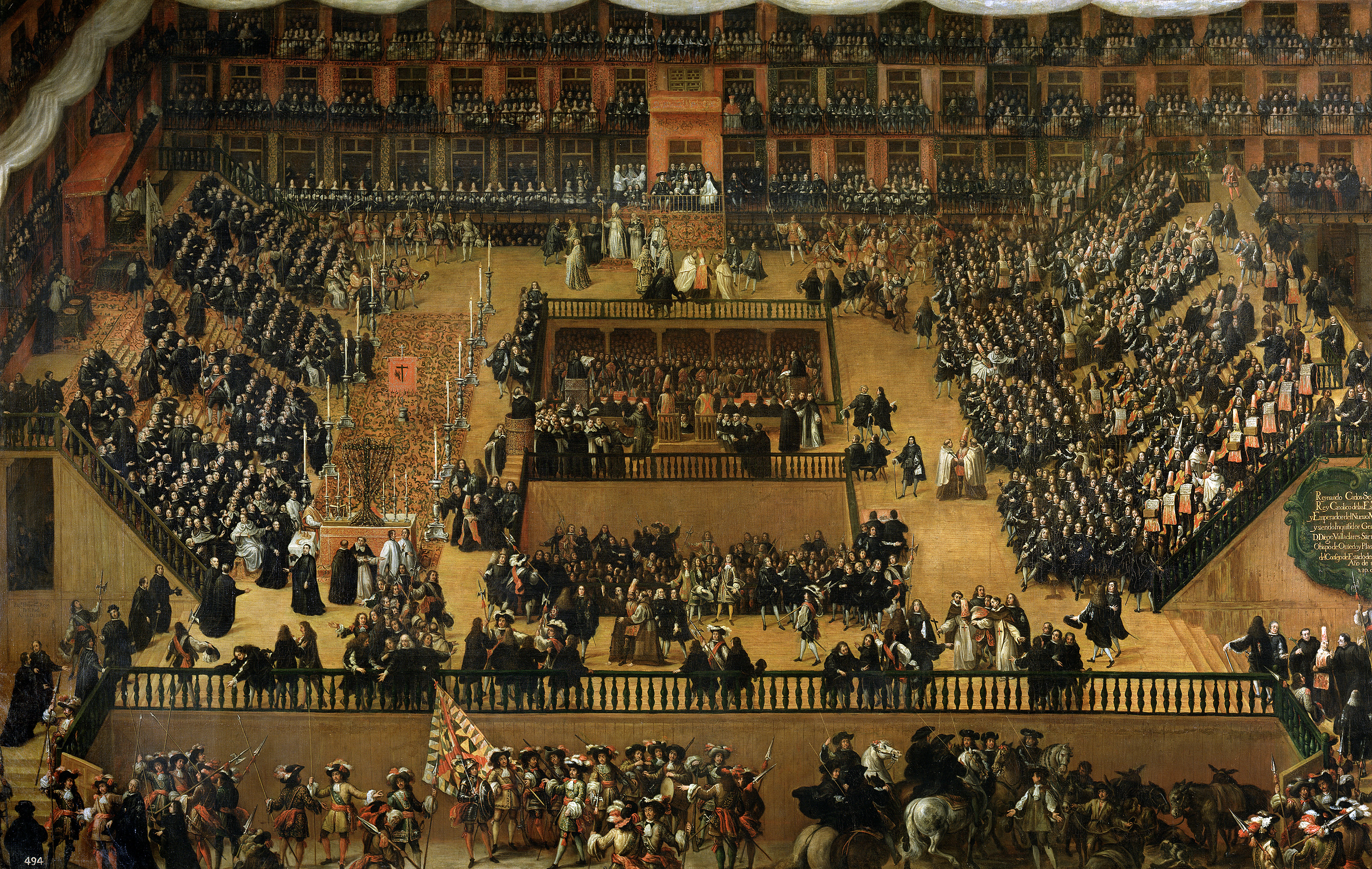
Auto-de-fé in the Plaza Mayor of Madrid, 1683 oil on canvas by Francisco Rizi (Museo del Prado)
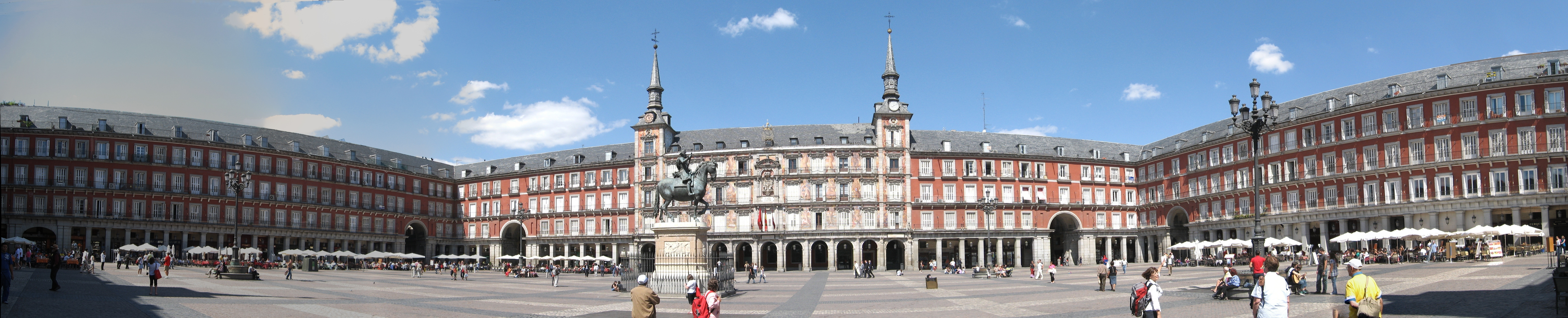
Three sides of the Plaza Mayor

== See also ==
- Game of Cañas
