= Casa de la Panadería =

Building in Madrid, Spain

Coordinates: 40.4158°N 3.7074°W

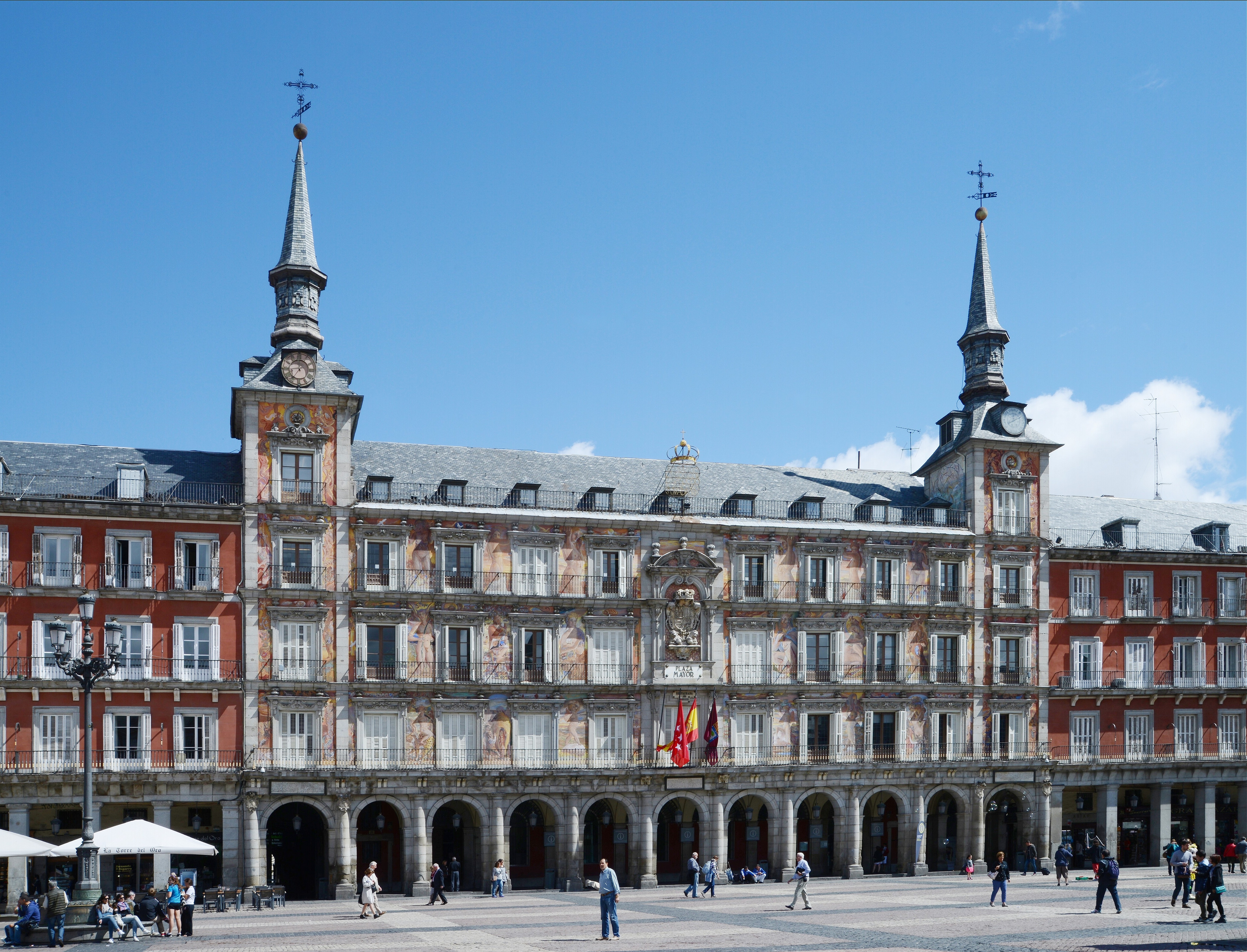
Façade of the Casa de la Panadería

The Casa de la Panadería is a municipal and cultural building on the north side of the Plaza Mayor in Madrid. It is four stories high, the ground floor comprising porticos and the top floor in the form of an attic, with its sides crowned by angular towers.

== History ==
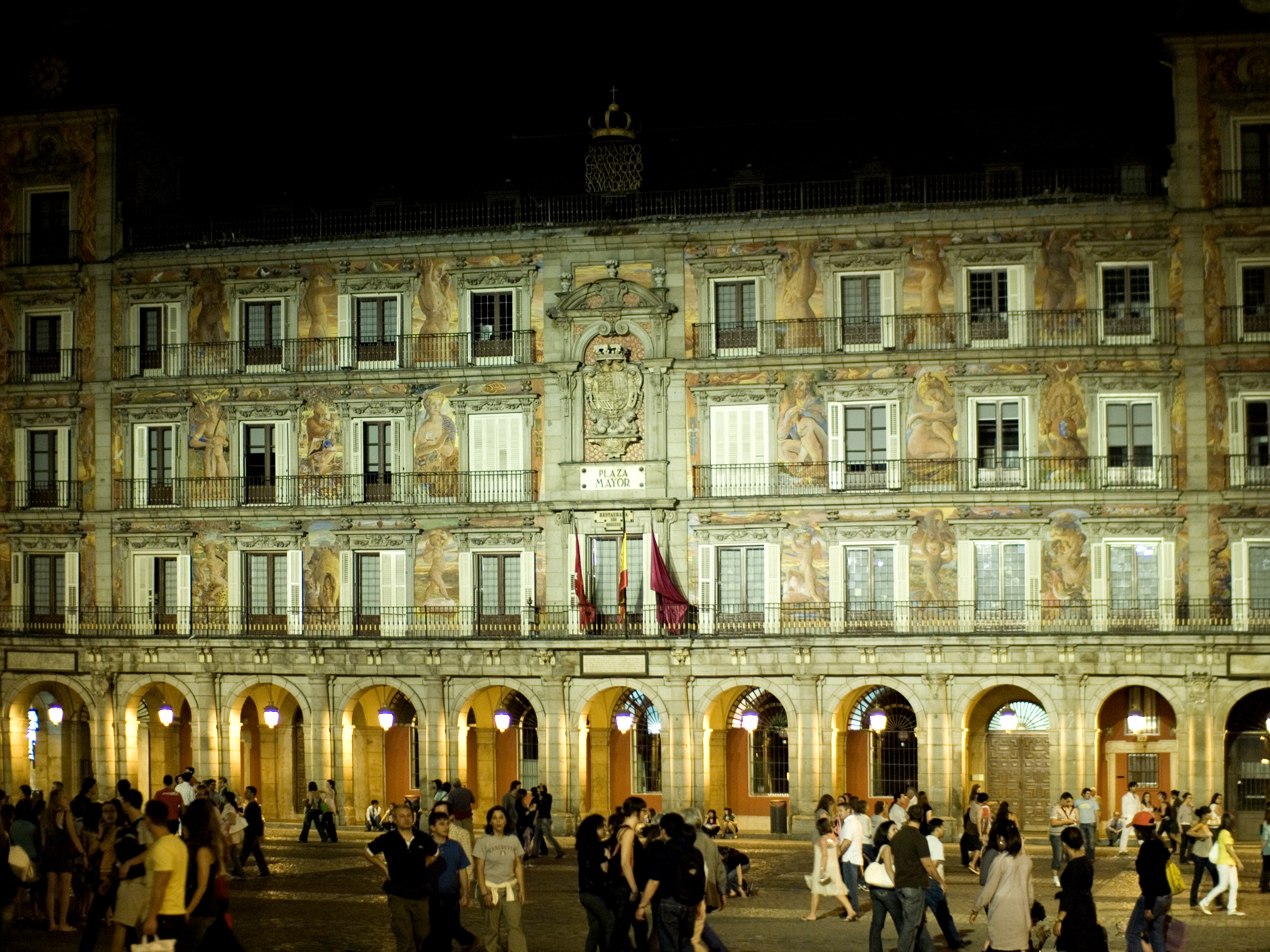
Frescoes in the facade

The Casa de la Panadería (Bakery House) was erected during the construction of the Plaza Mayor. Juan Gómez de Mora was in charge of its construction, which was completed in 1619. In August 1672 the building was completely destroyed following a fire in the plaza, the second one to happen in the square. The building was rebuilt in seventeen months by Tomás Román, who commissioned painters Claudio Coello and José Jiménez Donoso to decorate the interior and the frescoes on the facade. After the third burning of the plaza in 1790, the surviving Casa de la Panadería served as a reference for Juan de Villanueva's reconstruction of the rest of the plaza.

La Casa de la Panadería has suffered several remodelings since then, most notably that carried out by Joaquín María de la Vega in 1880.

In 1988, the Madrid City Council convened a public contest to undertake the decorating of the facade, due to the severe deterioration of the paintings done by painter and ceramicist Enrique Guijo in 1914. The artists Guillermo Pérez Villalta, Sigfrido Martín Begué, and Carlos Franco were invited to participate in the contest. Carlos Franco won with a design based on mythological figures such as Cybele, Proserpine, Bacchus, and Cupid, as well as others invented by the artist, interwoven into the history of Madrid and the Plaza Mayor. The work to paint Carlos Franco's frescoes was carried out in 1992.

== Uses ==
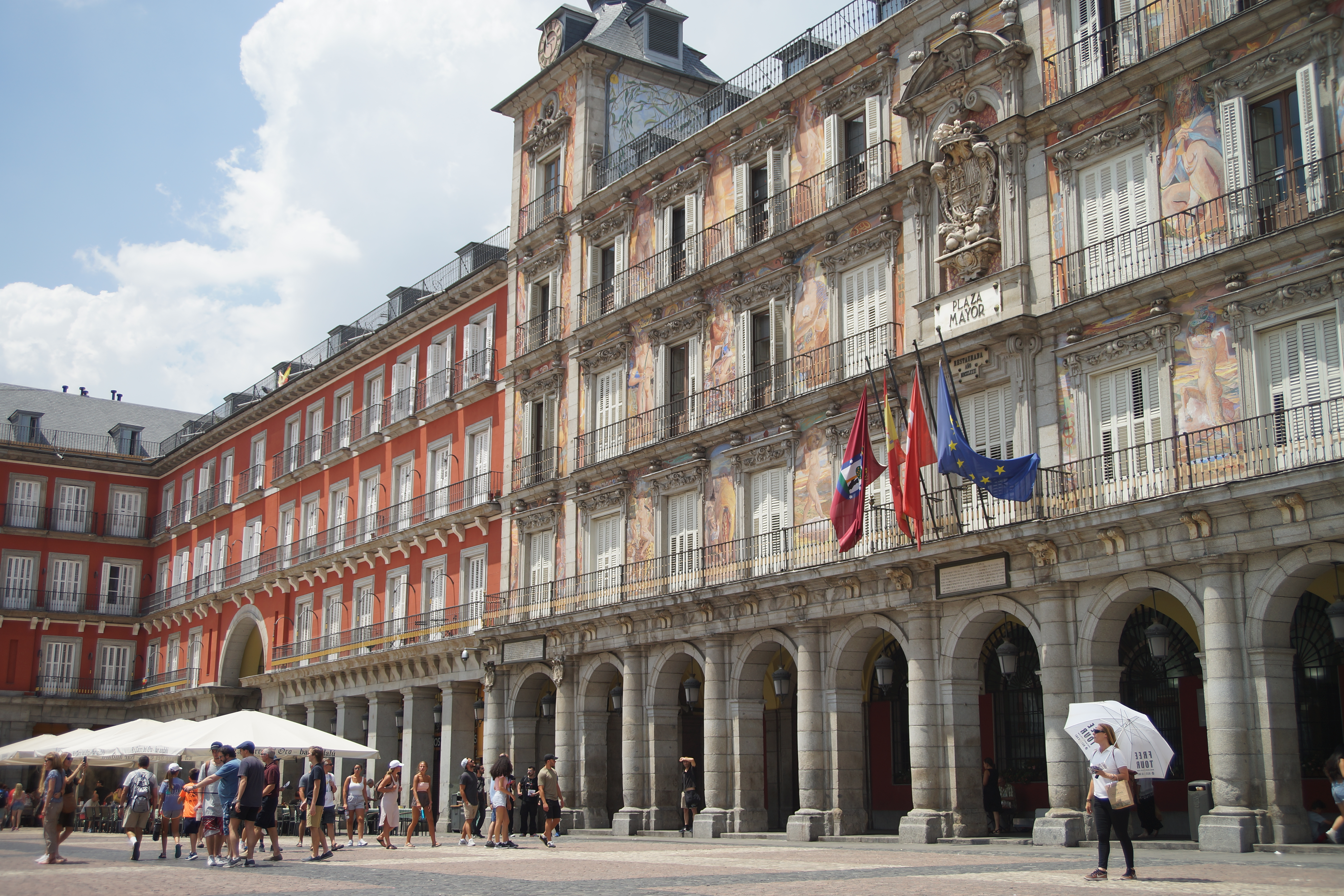
Interior of the Plaza Mayor in Madrid, showing gate sign and frescos

In the beginning, its lower levels housed the main bakery of the town. From 1732 on, it served as offices for the Peso Real and the Fiel Contraste. Between 1745 and 1774, the Real Academia de Bellas Artes de San Fernando (Royal Academy of Fine Arts of San Fernando) kept its headquarters there, as did the Real Academia de la Historia (Royal Academy of History) from 1774 to 1871. At the end of the 19th century, the Madrid City Council took charge of La Casa de la Panadería, converting it into the second Casa Consistorial de la Villa. Later on, it became the headquarters of the Municipal Library and Municipal Archives. Still later, it housed various municipal offices as well as institutions like the Centro Cultural Mesonero Romanos. Today its premises are occupied by the Madrid Tourist Board and the ground floor houses the Madrid Tourism Center. The space is often used to host exhibitions.

== Characteristics ==
=== Commemorative plaques ===
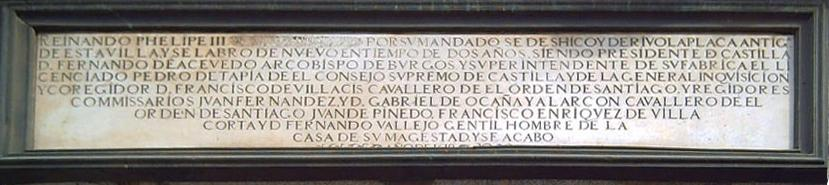

Reinando Felipe II y por su mandado se deshizo y derribó la plaza antigua de esta villa y se labró de nuevo en tiempo de dos años, siendo Presidente de Castilla Don Fernando de Acebedo Arzobispo de Burgos y superintendente de Castilla el licenciado Pedro de Tapia del Supremo Consejo de Castilla y de la general Inquisición y Corregidor Don Francisco de Villacís caballero de la Orden de Santiago y Regidores Comisarios Juan Fernández y Don Gabriel de Ocaña de Alarcón caballero de la Orden de Santiago, Juan de Piñedo, Francisco Enríquez de Villacorta y Don Fernando Vallejo Gentil Hombre de la casa de Su Majestad u se acabó en el año 1619.

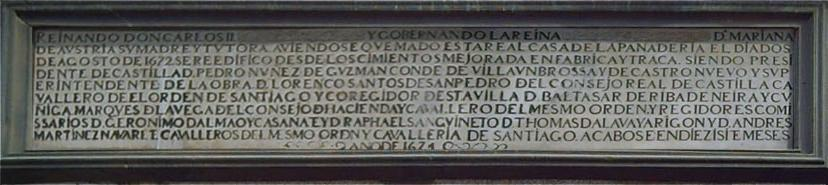

Reinando Don Carlos II y gobernando la Reina Doña Mariana de Austria su madre y tutora, habiéndose quemado esta Real Casa de la Panadería el día dos de agosto de 1672, se reedificó desde los cimientos mejorada en fábrica y traza siendo Presidente de Castilla Pedro Nuñez de Guzmán Conde de Villaumbrosa y Castronuevo y superintendente de la obra Don Lorenzo Santos de San Pedro del Consejo Real de Castilla, caballero de la Orden de Santiago, y Corregidor de esta villa Don Baltasar de Rivadeneira y Cuñiga Marques de la Vega del Consejo de hacienda y caballero de la misma orden y Regidores Comisarios Don Gerónimo Dalmao y Casanaey y Rafael San Guineto Don Tomás de Álava y Arigón y Don Andrés Martínez Navarite caballeros del mismo Orden y Caballería de Santiago. Acabose en diecisiete meses. Año de 1674.

=== Spanish coat of arms ===
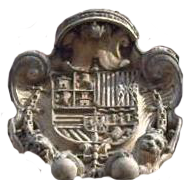
Coat of arms of the Spain of Charles II (the last Habsburg) on the façade of the Casa de la Panadería.

Found at the top center of La Casa de la Panadería are the royal Spanish arms from the reign of Carlos II. Note that the arms of Portugal are missing, as Portugal had recently regained its independence from Spanish rule.

This shield is composed of the arms of Castile and León in the first quarter, the arms of Aragón and Sicily in the second, the arms of Austria and Burgundy modern in the third, and the arms of Burgundy ancient and Brabant in the fourth. The arms of Flanders and Tyrol are found in the lower escutcheon on the nombril point, and the symbol for Granada in the center of the shield. The arms of Portugal would have been situated in an escutcheon on the honor point, between those of Castile and León and those of Aragón.

== See also ==
- Plaza Mayor, Madrid
