= Juan Gómez de Mora =

Spanish architect

Juan Gómez de Mora (1586–1648) was a Spanish architect, active in the 17th century. He was a main figure of Spanish early-Baroque architecture in the city of Madrid. Spanish art historian Virginia Tovar Martín has published scholarly works on Gómez de Mora.

== Life ==
Gómez de Mora was born and died in Madrid. His father, also Juan Gómez, was a Spanish Renaissance court painter to Philip II of Spain and was brother-in-law of the architect Francisco de Mora. Upon the death of his father in 1597, his uncle Francisco took charge of his education and training. Gómez de Mora would later oversee the construction of a number of buildings designed by his uncle.

After the death of his uncle in 1610, and at the age of 24, he was appointed master builder of the Alcazar of Madrid, as well as architect of Philip III. Among his most outstanding works are the Plaza Mayor, which he built in a rectangular and arcaded shape, the Madrid Court Jail and the Casa de la Villa, one of the headquarters of the Madrid City Hall.

He also made the main altarpiece of the basilica of the monastery of Guadalupe in Cáceres. In Salamanca he built La Clerecía for the Jesuit Order. In Zamora he is the author of the Hospital de la Encarnación, the current headquarters of the Provincial Council.

== Works ==
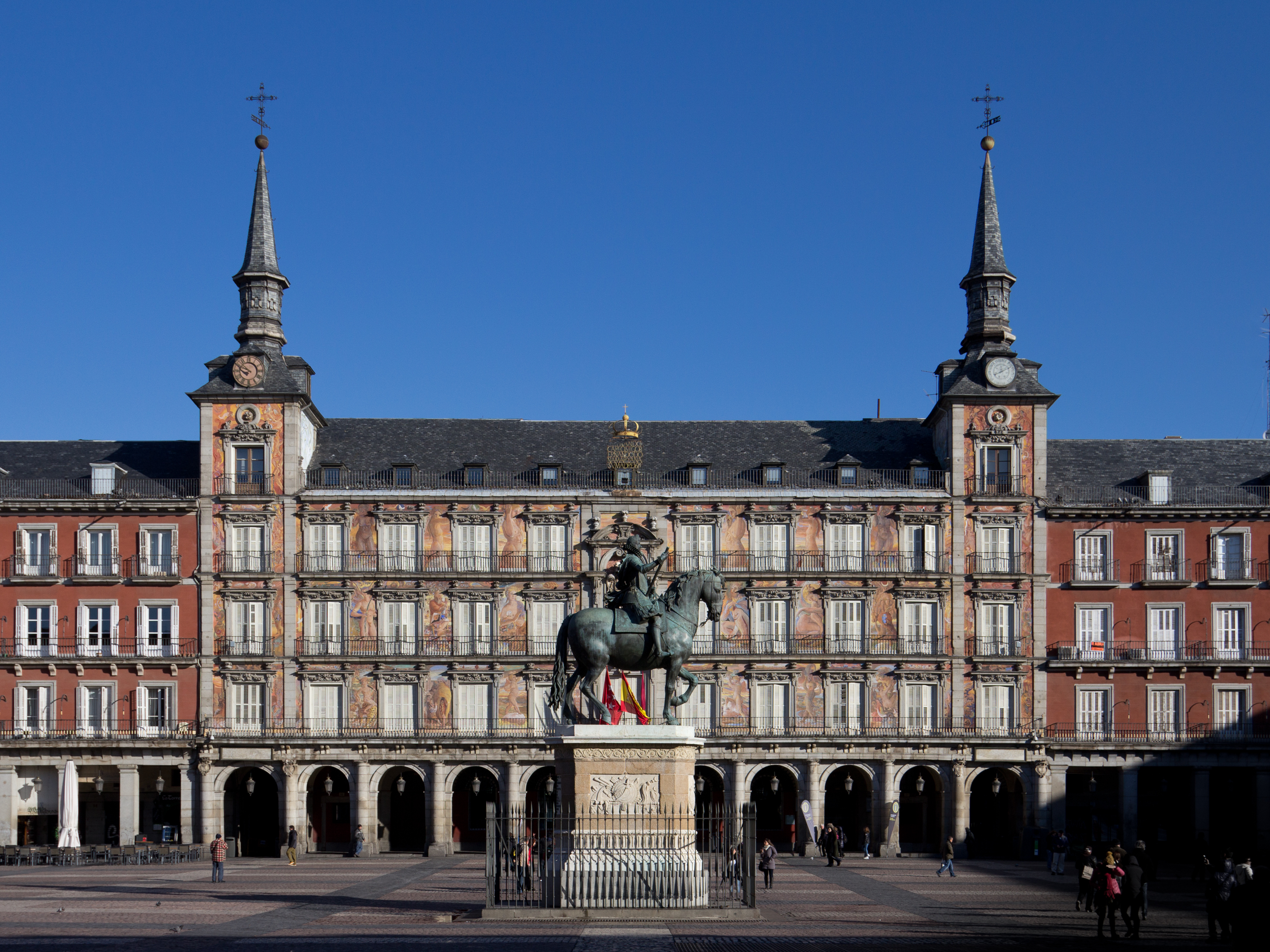
View of the Casa de la Panadería in the Plaza Mayor de Madrid.

=== In Madrid ===
- Convent of San Gil (from 1613)
- Plaza Mayor and its surroundings, originally the houses of the Cava de San Miguel (1617–1619), and Casa de la Panadería (1617–1619).
- Project "Near Felipe IV"
- City Council building until 1644
- Mayors Hall and Court House
- Jail Project, later became the Palacio de Santa Cruz and is currently the Foreign Ministry.
- Augustinian Monastery of Santa Isabel, in collaboration with Jerome Lazarus Goiti ( 1639 - 1648 ).
- Our Lady of Loreto, in collaboration with Jerome Lazarus Goiti ( 1641 - 1648 ).
- Toledo Bridge project
- Choir Reform Monastery of Barefoot Royals
- Reform of the English College, on the site now occupied by the Church of St. Ignatius of Loyola
- Palace of the Councils

=== Works in Getafe ===
- Cathedral of the Madeleine in Getafe

=== Works in Alcala de Henares ===
- Patio de Santo Tomas de Villanueva
- Monasterio de San Bernardo (The Bernardas)
