= Game of Cañas =

Equestrian game practiced in Spain

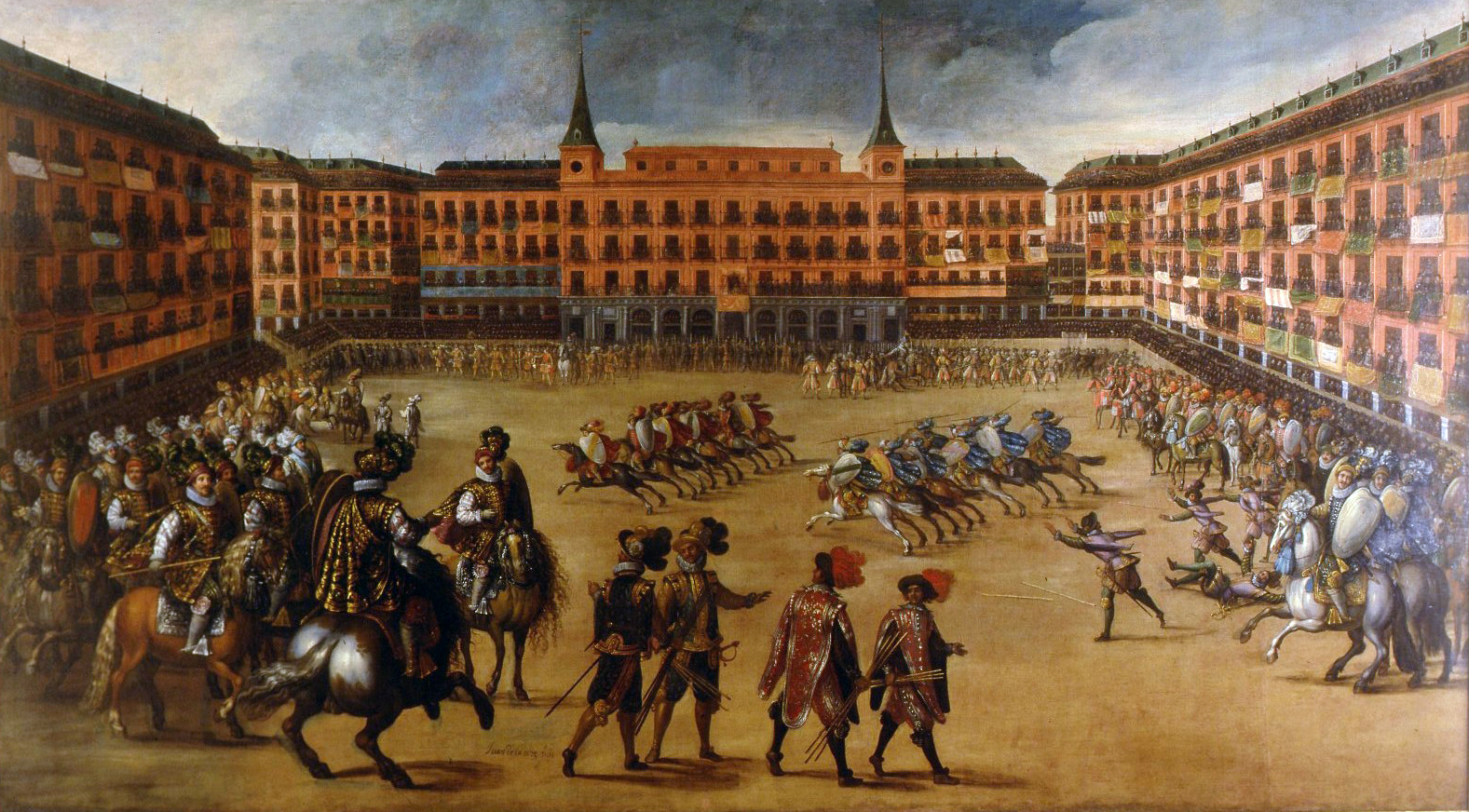
Juego de cañas celebrated in the 16th century in the Plaza Mayor, Madrid.

The Game of Cañas (Spanish: Juego de Cañas) was a renowned game in Spain from the 16th to the 18th century, held in many of its main squares. The origins of the practice of running cañas, as it was commonly called, date back to the ancient Romans and was introduced to Spain by the Muslims. In the Americas, it was introduced by the Spanish.

The spirit of the game revolved around simulating a military or combat action. It consisted of rows of men mounted on horseback (usually nobles) throwing reeds at each other like lances or darts and stopping them with shields. Combat charges were performed, with participants escaping in circles or semicircles in groups of rows.

== See also ==
- Reed Plant
- Medieval tournament
