= Convent of Santa Isabel =

Monastery in Madrid, Spain

The Convent of Santa Isabel is a royal monastery in central Madrid, Spain. Belonging to the Augustine order of nuns founded by the wife of Philip III of Spain, Margaret of Austria, it is located near the Atocha Train Station. A school for girls there had been founded by Philip II. It was designed in the 17th century by Juan Gómez de Mora.

Since April 1995 it has been a "bien de interés cultural" monument under the administration of the Patrimonio Nacional.
