= Ephemeral architecture =

Architecture of temporary buildings

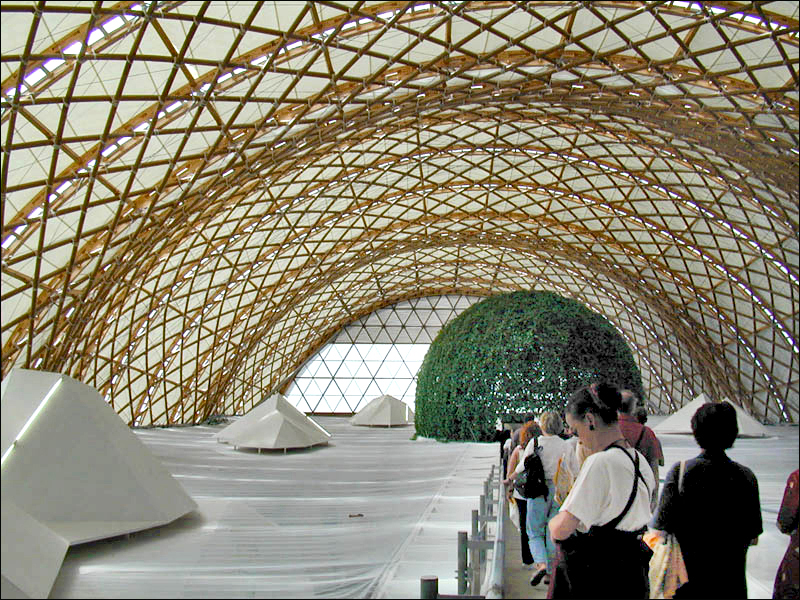
Japan Pavilion at the Expo 2000 in Hanover, designed by Shigeru Ban, one of the architects of the Pompidou Center

Ephemeral architecture is the art or technique of designing and building structures that are transient, that last only a short time. Ephemeral art has been a constant in the history of architecture, although a distinction must be made between constructions conceived for temporary use and those that, despite being built with durability in mind, have a brief expiration due to various factors, especially the poor quality of the materials (wood, adobe, plaster, cardboard, textiles), in cultures that have not sufficiently developed solid construction systems.

Ephemeral architecture was usually used for celebrations and festivals of all kinds, as scenography or theatrical scenery for a specific event, which was dismantled after the event. It has existed since ancient art—it is at the origin of forms such as the triumphal arch, whose ephemeral model was fixed in permanent constructions during the Roman Empire—and it was very common in European courts during the Renaissance and especially in the Baroque.

Despite its temporary character, ephemeral architecture can reflect the techniques available and the ideas of celebration in the period during which it stood. Currently, this architecture is seen in experimental installations, often to channel ideas about public space, social participation, and between city and nature.

== Classification ==
In the social context there are various ways of including ephemeral architecture: for specific events (traditional ephemeral architecture), as a way of life (nomadic architecture), as a requirement of a society that reveres change (obsolescent architecture), and as a necessity (emergency architecture).

=== Traditional ephemeral architecture ===
The architecture that is ephemeral because of its "eventuality".

==== Ancient period ====
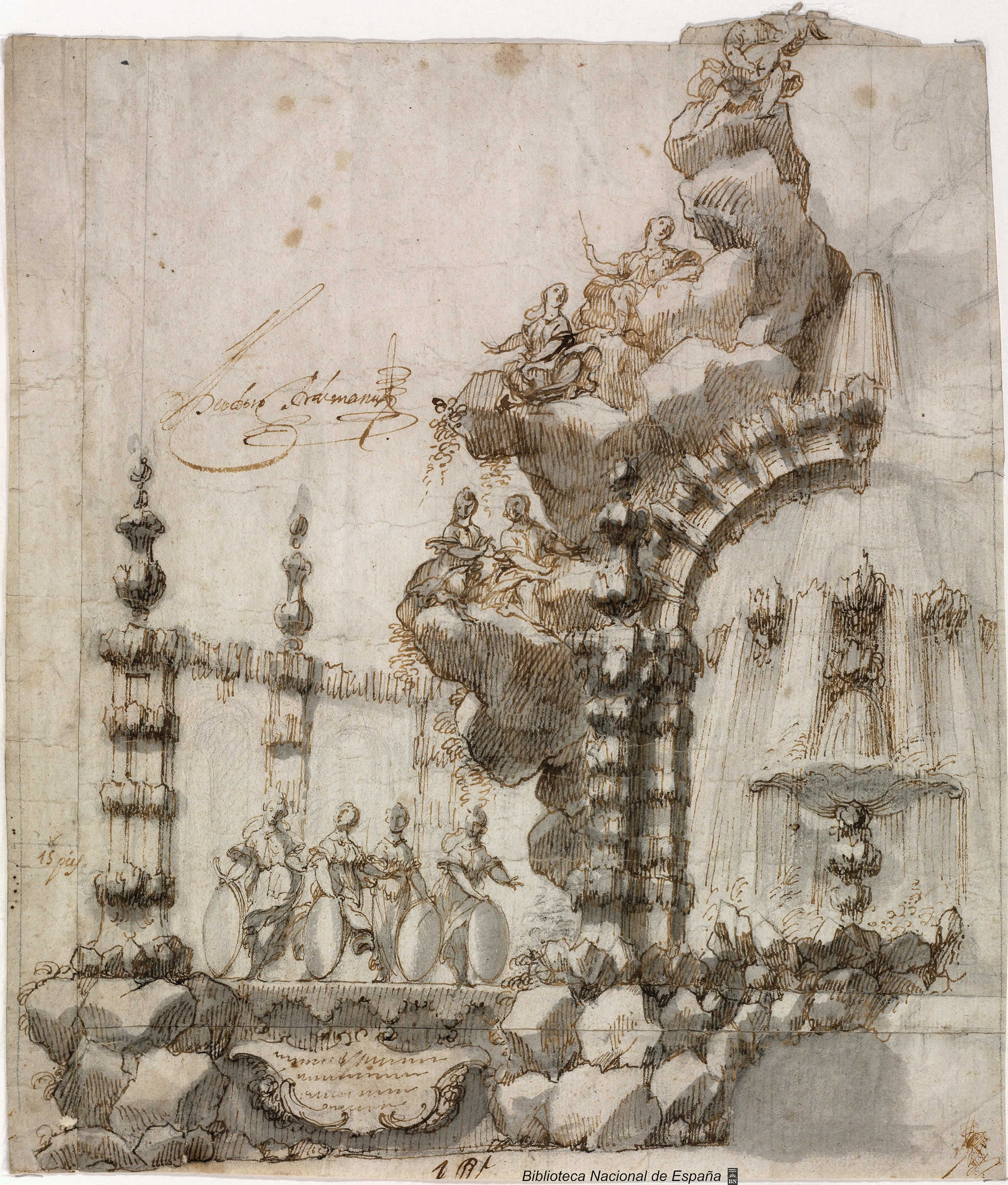
Ephemeral architecture project for the entry of Felipe V in Madrid (February 18, 1701), by Teodoro Ardemans.

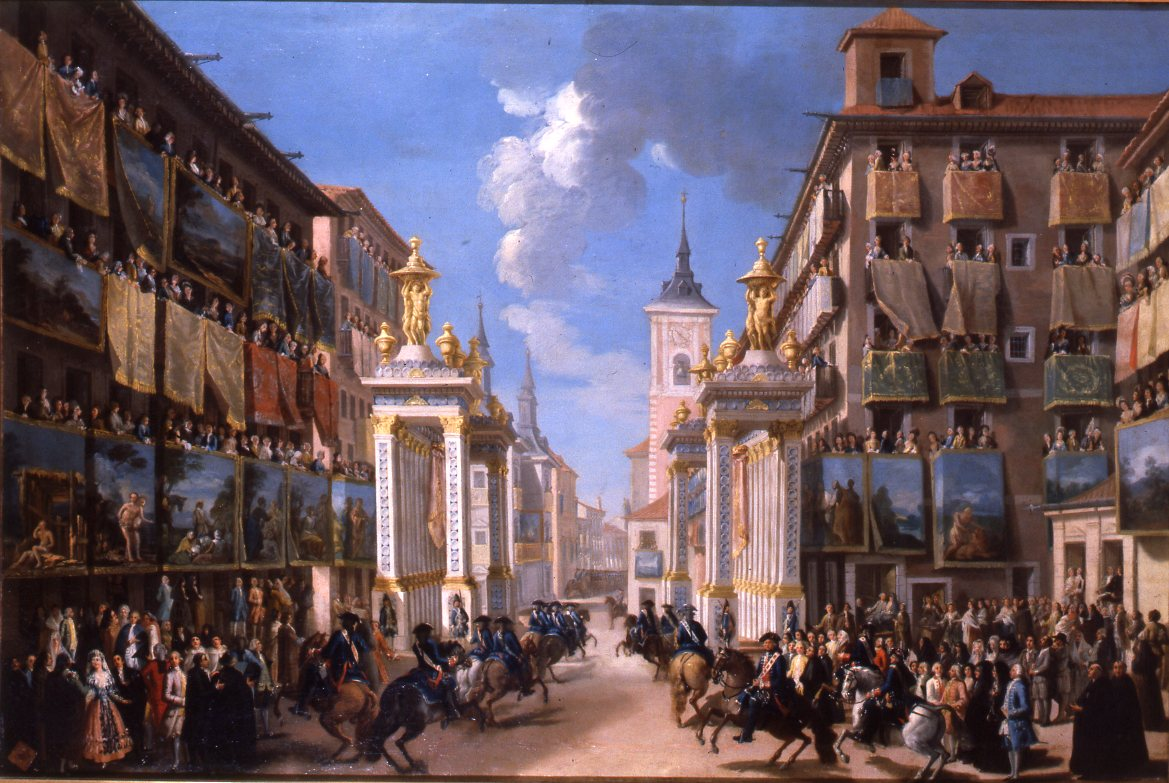
Embellishment of the Platerias Street on the occasion of the entry of Charles III in Madrid, by Lorenzo Quirós, 1760.

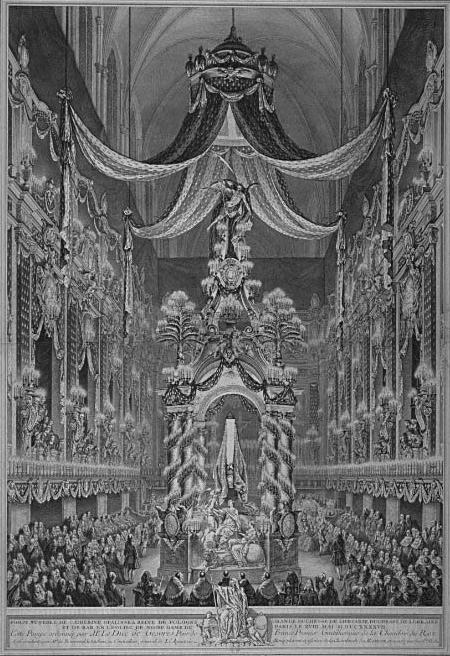
Funerary ceremony in honor of Catherine Opalińska, mother-in-law of Louis XV, held in 1747 at the Cathedral of Notre Dame in Paris.

There are few documents of constructions designed with an ephemeral duration, on the contrary, both Egyptian architecture and Greek and Roman stand out for their monumentality and the long-lasting eagerness of their constructions, especially the religious ones. The ephemeral constructions were especially used for public ceremonies and celebrations of military victories, or for festivities related to kings and emperors. Thus, there is a valuable testimony of a pavilion erected by Ptolemy II of Egypt to celebrate a banquet, reported by Athenaeus:

Four of the columns were shaped like palm trees, while those in the center resembled thyrsus. Outside the columns, on three sides, there was a portico with a peristyle and vaulted ceiling, where the retinue of guests could be placed. Inside, the pavilion was surrounded with purple curtains, except for the spaces between the columns, adorned with skins of extraordinary variety and beauty.

— Deipnosophistae, V, 196 y ss.

==== Early modern period, Renaissance and Baroque ====
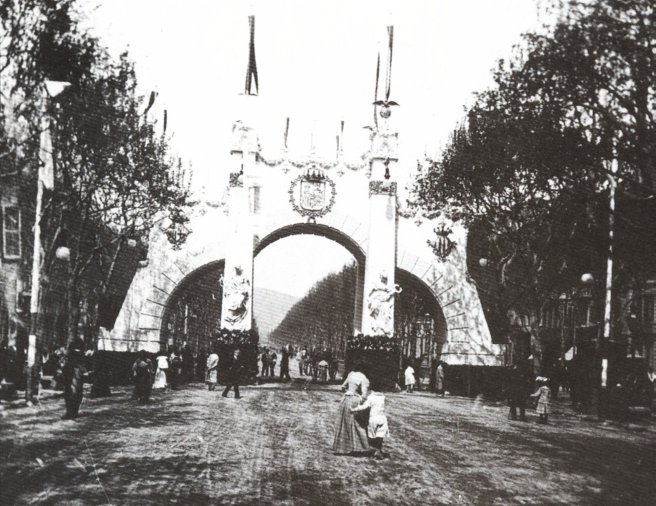
Triumphal Arch in honor of Alfonso XIII, on the occasion of the king's visit to Barcelona, on 6 April 1904, by Enric Sagnier i Villavecchia.

The splendor of ephemeral architecture was produced in the Early Modern Period, in the Renaissance and—especially— the Baroque, eras of consolidation of the absolute monarchy, when European monarchs sought to elevate their figure above that of their subjects, resorting to all kinds of propagandistic and exalting acts of their power, in political and religious ceremonies or celebrations of a playful nature, which showed the magnificence of their government. One of the most frequent resources were the thriumphal arches, erected for any act such as military celebrations, royal weddings or visits of the monarch to various cities. There are several testimonies in this regard, such as the triumphal arch at the Porte Saint-Denis for the entrance of Enrique II in Paris in 1549, the arch at the Pont Nôtre-Dame for the entrance of Charles IX in Paris in 1571, the triumphal arch of Maximilian I designed by Dürer in 1513, the triumphal arch for the entrance of Charles V in Bruges in 1515, the arch for the entrance of Prince Philip (future Philip II of Spain) in Ghent in 1549, etc.

During the Baroque, the ornate character of the art of this time reflected life's transience—related to the memento mori, the fleeting nature of wealth in light of death, in parallel to the pictorial genre of the vanitas. This sentiment led to a vitalist appreciation of the fleetingness of the instant, to enjoy the moments of relaxation that life offers, or the celebrations and solemn acts. Thus, births, weddings, deaths, religious ceremonies, royal coronations and other recreational or ceremonial events were marked with the pomp of a scenography character, combining architecture and decoration to create grand spectacles, where the illusory element, the attenuation of the border between reality and fantasy took on special relevance.

Baroque art sought the creation of an alternative reality through fiction and illusion, resorting to foreshortening and illusionist perspective, a tendency that had its maximum expression in festivities, the playful celebration, where buildings such as churches or palaces, or a neighborhood or an entire city, became theaters of life, in scenarios where reality and illusion were mixed, where the senses were subverted to deception and artifice. The Counter-Reformationist Church played a special role, seeking to show its superiority over the Protestant Churches with pomp and pageantry, through events such as solemn mass, canonizations, jubilees, processions or papal investitures. But just as lavish were the celebrations of the monarchy and the aristocracy, with events such as coronations, royal weddings and births, funerals, ambassador visits, any event that allowed the monarch to display his power to the admiration of the people. Baroque festivities involved a conjugation of all the arts, from architecture and the plastic arts to poetry, music, dance, theater, pyrotechnics, floral arrangements, water games, etc. Architects such as Bernini or Pietro da Cortona, or Alonso Cano and Sebastián Herrera Barnuevo in Spain, contributed their talent to such events, designing structures, choreographys, lighting and other elements, which often served them as a testing ground for future more serious endeavors. The baldachin for the canonization of Saint Elizabeth of Portugal thus served Bernini for his future design of St. Peter's Baldachin in St. Peter's Basilica, and Carlo Rainaldi's quarantore (sacred theater of the Jesuits) was a model of the church of Santa Maria in Campitelli.

==== Contemporary period ====
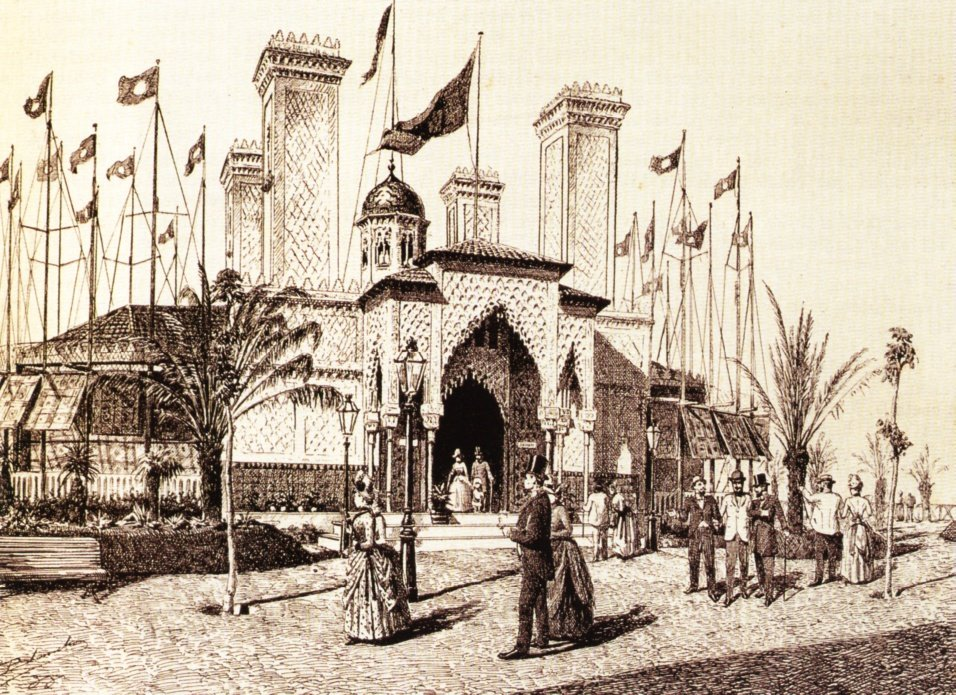
Pavilion of the Compañía Transatlántica, designed by Antoni Gaudí for the Barcelona Universal Exposition (1888).

In the Contemporary Period the phenomenon of the universal exhibitions— trade fairs held in cities all over the world to showcase scientific, technological and cultural advances to the population, and which became true mass spectacles and great advertising showcases for companies or countries that promoted their products—is worth mentioning. These exhibitions were held in enclosures where each country or company built a pavilion to promote itself, which were buildings or structures conceived in an ephemeral way to last only as long as the exhibition lasted. However, many of these constructions were preserved due to their success or the originality of their design, becoming a testing ground and promotion of the work of many architects. These exhibitions saw the first experiments with new typologies and materials characteristic of contemporary architecture, such as construction with concrete, iron and glass, or the important development of interior design, especially fostered by modernism. The first universal exhibition took place in London in 1851, being famous for the Crystal Palace designed by Joseph Paxton, a large glass palace with iron structure, which despite being preserved was destroyed by fire in 1937. From then until now there have been numerous exhibitions, many of which have revealed great architectural achievements, such as the Exposition Universelle of 1889, when the Eiffel Tower was built. The Barcelona International Exposition, which produced the German Pavilion by Ludwig Mies van der Rohe; The Brussels World's Fair, which produced the Atomium, by André Waterkeyn; the Seattle World's Fair, famous for the Space Needle; the International and Universal Exposition, with the US Pavilion in the form of a geodesic dome, by Buckminster Fuller; that of Sevilla '92, which bequeathed a theme park (Isla Mágica) and several office and technological development buildings (Cartuja 93); or that of Lisbon 1998, which legacy was the Oceanarium.

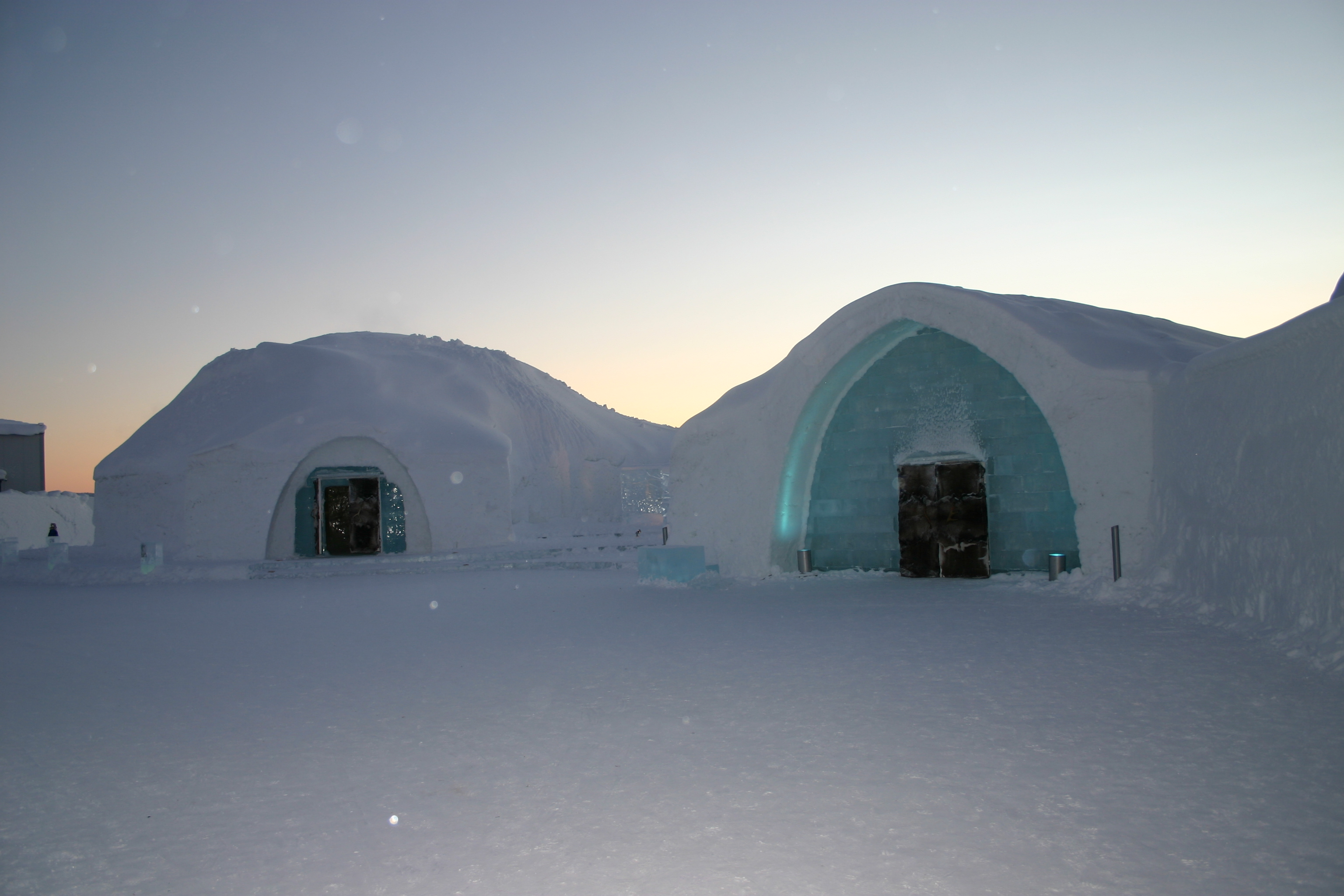
Icehotel in Jukkasjärvi, Sweden.

Finally, it is worth mentioning the boom since the mid-20th century in ice architecture, especially in the Nordic countries—as is logical given the special climatic circumstances that require this type of construction—where various types of ice buildings have begun to proliferate, such as hotels, museums, palaces and other structures generally conceived for public use and for recreational or cultural purposes. These constructions are based on traditional structures such as the igloo, the typical dwelling of the Inuit, but have evolved by incorporating all the theoretical and technical advances of modern architecture. Among other buildings made of ice, the Icehotel in Jukkasjärvi—built in 1990 on a provisional basis and maintained thanks to the success of the initiative, being redecorated every year with the participation of various architects, artists and students of various disciplines—is worth mentioning.

Except in the case of ice architecture, which hosts functions usually reserved for traditional architecture and needs to be preserved to survive, the construction methods used for this type of ephemeral architecture, as well as the materials, do not differ much from those used in traditional architecture. This and the fact that the societies in which it was developed were prone to venerate monumentality, and the success of some of the constructions of the universal exhibitions, meant that many of these buildings were finally preserved. Nowadays, the architecture that can best be compared to this type of event constructions are exhibitions (in museums, on the street, etc.) and cinematographic or theatrical scenographys. It is worth mentioning the relationship of ephemeral architecture with citizen cartography, and its relationship with the decision-making power of the user, who becomes the architect of his part of the space on some occasions. It can happen that specific parts of a building are movable, to configure a space in a momentary way in which everyone can adapt the conditions to the most suitable for himself.

=== Nomadic architecture ===
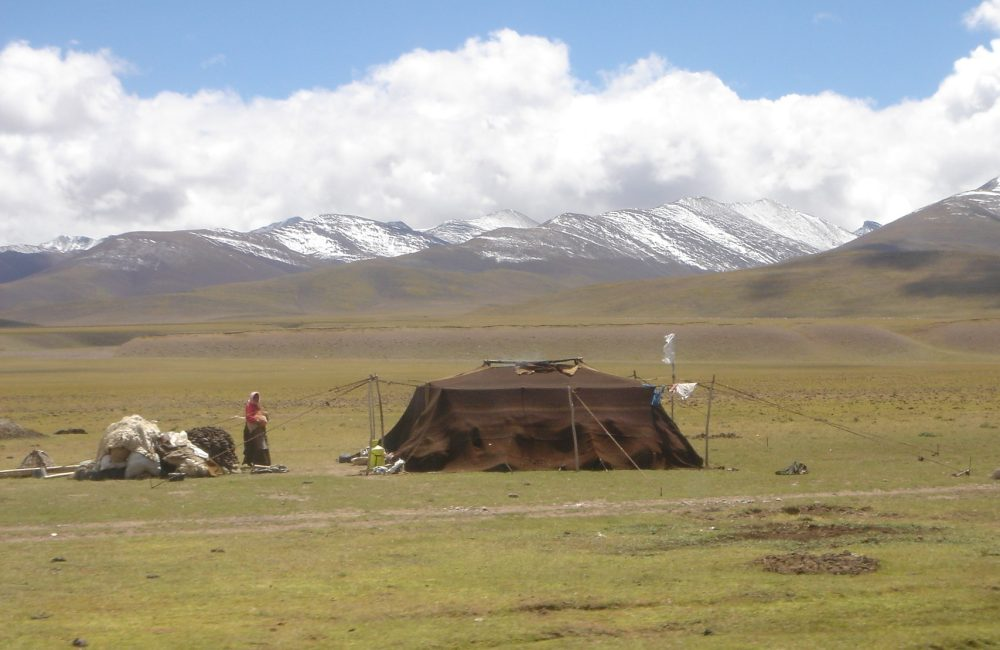
Nomads near Nam Lake

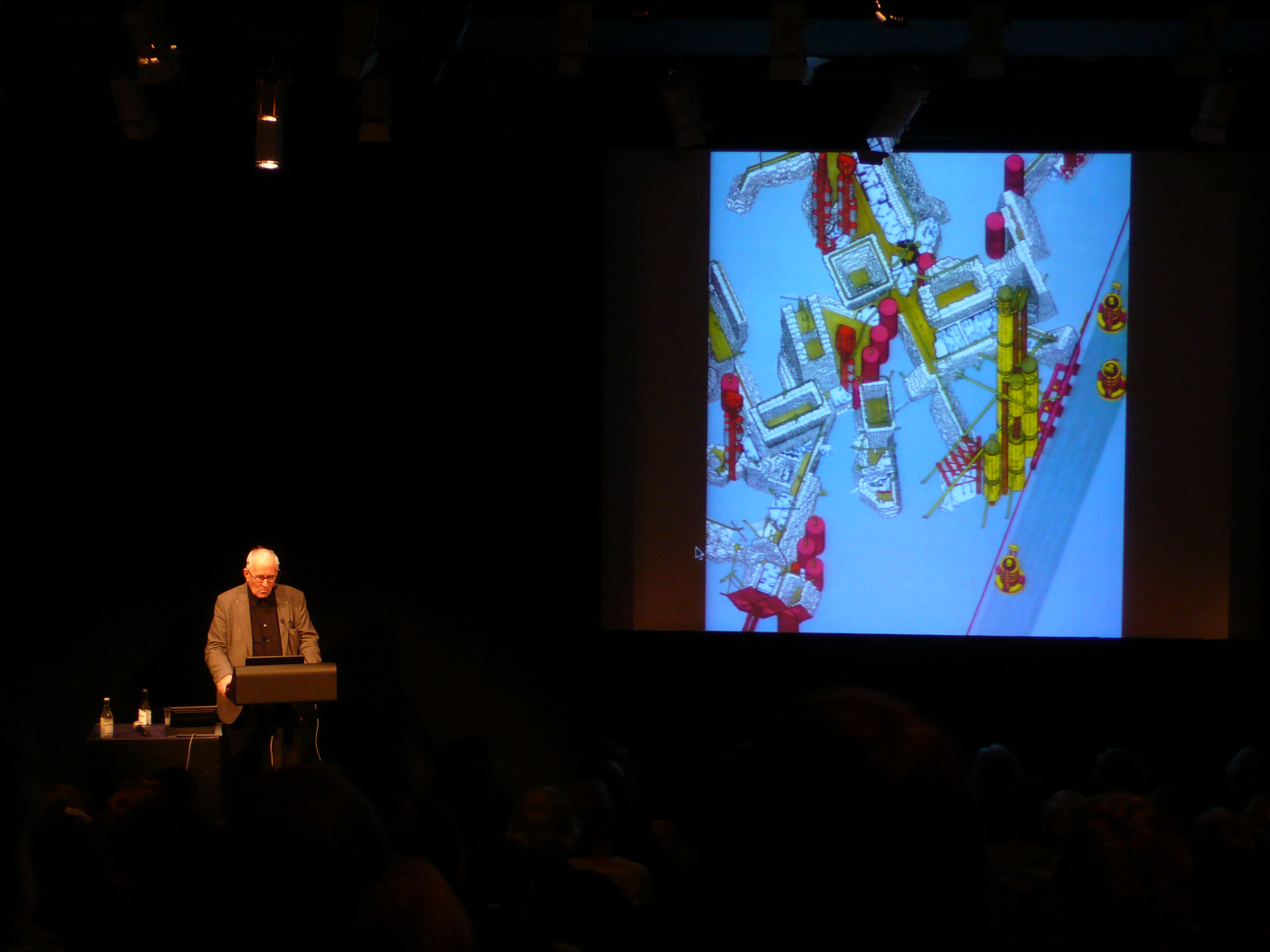
Peter Cook presents Archigram's project of "Plug-in City"

Portable domestic architecture that is ephemeral because of its "translationality". Architecture, in its origin, was born being ephemeral and to this day certain tribes continue with this lifestyle. There are theoretical projects that transfer this concept to the city, such as the New Babylon, developed from 1948 by Constant Nieuwenhuys. A utopia on a planetary scale, which advocates a return to nomadic origins thanks to the improvement of the machine, which frees the human being from his tasks (food production, etc.), and in this way a new evolution of the human being appears, the homo ludens who, freed from his occupations, can devote himself to art and happiness. For this achievement the world must be conceived from the freedom of choices and therefore of movements.

New Babylon does not stop anywhere (because the earth is round); it knows no borders (because there are no more national economies), nor collectivities (because humanity is fluctuating). Any place is accessible to each and everyone. The whole planet becomes the home of the inhabitants of the earth. Everyone changes place when he or she wants to. Life is an endless journey through a world that transforms so rapidly that each time seems different.

— Constant Nieuwenhuys, New Babylon Manifesto, 1974

L'Architecture Mobile (1958) by Yona Friedman and the Plug-in-City (1964) by Archigram are also examples of the megastructures approach to this type of utopian cities. The cycle closes. If the human being becomes sedentary because he discovers the benefits of cultivation, after millennia machines free him from such a chore, so he can put his house back in his backpack and travel the world.

=== Obsolescent architecture ===
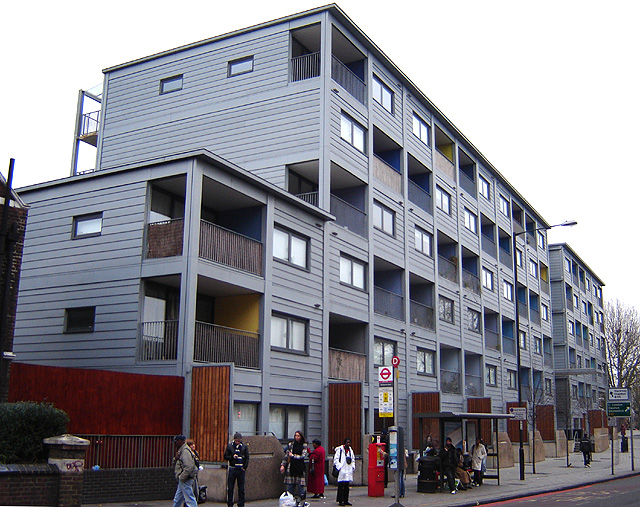
Raines court building, a symbol of industrial architecture, in Stoke Newington, London

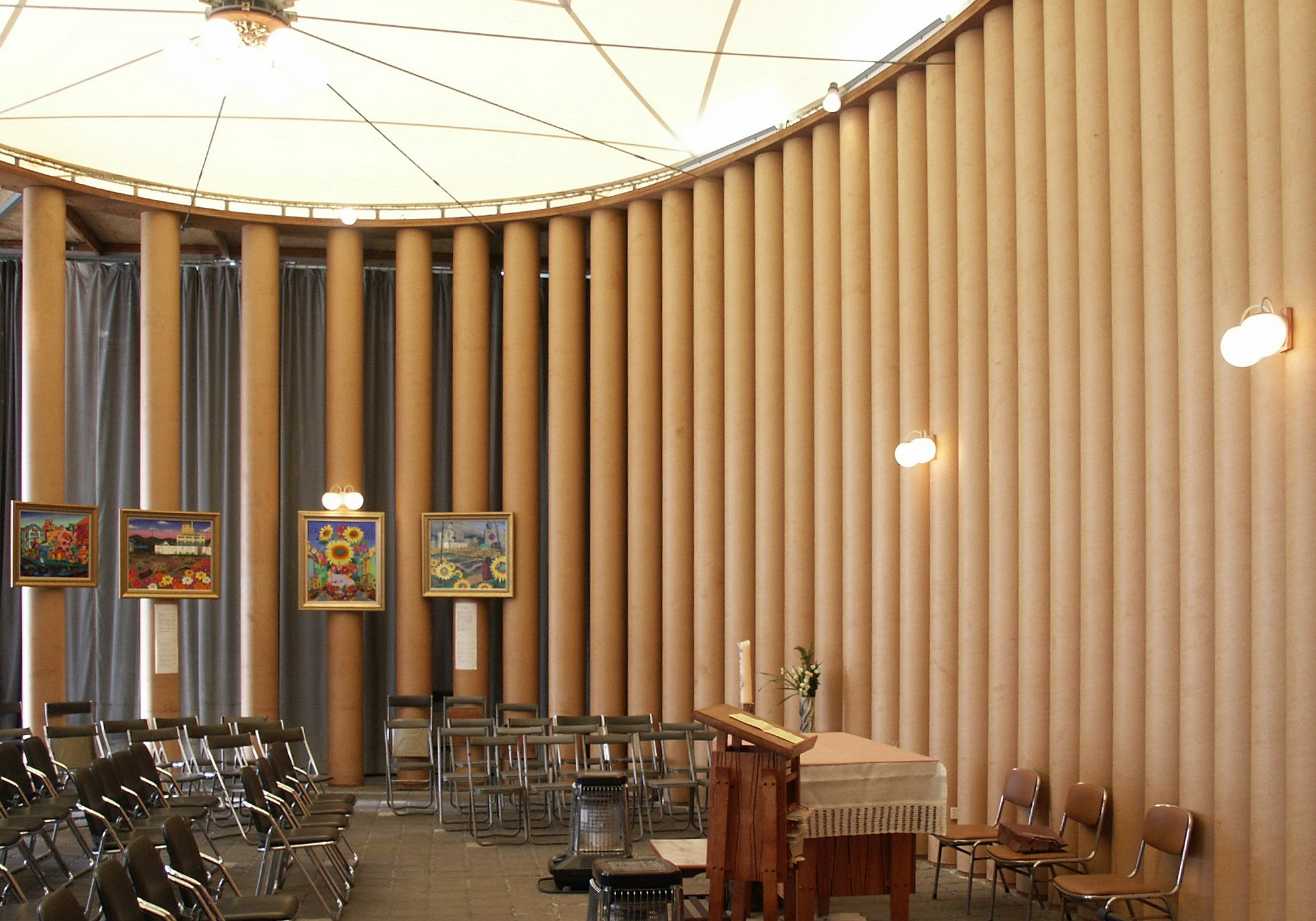
Takatori Catholic Church, the structure is made of cardboard tubes. The church was initially built in Kōbe after the Great Hanshin-Awaji Earthquake in 1995. Although it was later dismantled and donated to Taiwan for reconstruction in 2008.

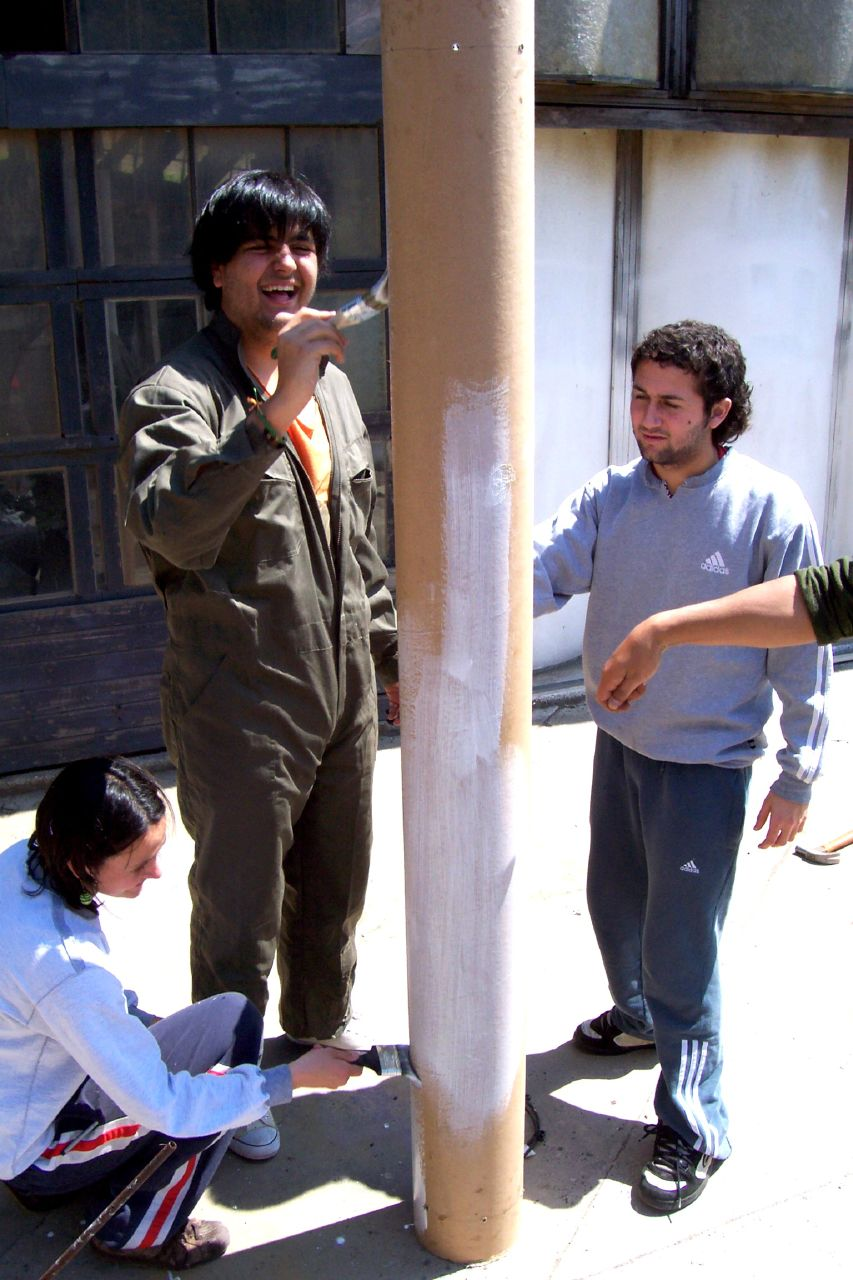
Working in the Ciudad abierta de Ritoque, Chile.

Architecture that is ephemeral because of its " temporariness". Architectural types that until now had always been conceived to remain, such as the house, are now thought to be dismembered and their pieces reused. It is the inheritance of the industrial society that allows us an architecture of prefabricated dwellings. As Sigfried Giedion explained at the First Congress of the CIAM:

Aware of the profound disturbances brought to the social structure by machinism, the transformation of the economic order and social life implies a transformation of the architectural phenomenon.

— Sigfried Giedion, Declaration of the 1st CIAM held from June 25 to 29, 1928 at the Château de La Sarraz

In contrast to nomadic architecture, the structure of the world remains sedentary, while the objects within it change at an increasingly fast rate, such as the latest generation of mobile phones, fashionable clothes and fast food. These terms have settled in the collective unconscious and encourage a valuing of change and speed. Within this way of thinking about the time of use, ecology is a rising value, since the reuse of obsolete pieces counters landfill waste. There is also a prevailing trivialization in many social aspects, with the dominance of the ephemeral and the disposable, extending to what are described as "garbage-jobs", "garbage-companies" and "garbage-stores". This approach involves the elimination of the qualities of things. In the words of José Luis Pardo:

The only way to maintain the type—and this is the brilliant idea we are talking about—is for things to originally lack properties (i.e., to be junk beforehand) without their conversion into junk deriving from the wear and tear generated by use.

— José Luis Pardo, Trash has never been so beautiful. p.85a

=== Emergency architecture ===
Architecture that is ephemeral because of its "economy of resources". Based on immediate constructions, the fundamental premise is the rapid response required for its construction. That it will lose its use, be dismembered or change its place is of no interest. The important thing is to solve a specific need at a specific time, in the simplest way. It can be related to moments of natural catastrophes, as in the case of the Paper House by Shigeru Ban (1995) to provide a temporary housing for several victims of the Kobe earthquake; or with social sectors with few resources who want to provide them with a better quality of life. The latter case is more related to self-construction as a liberation from the bonds of capitalism, the construction of a greater solidarity among men, a condition of life in harmony with nature, and the feeling of being architects of a new beginning. The Rural Studio in Alabama and the Ciudad abierta de Ritoque (Valparaíso) are examples of this field of architectural experimentation.

== Principles ==
- Temporariness. Life, nowadays, is unpredictable. "Everyone changes places when they want to. Life is an endless journey through a world that transforms so rapidly that each time seems different." Ephemeral architecture is meant to respond to a specific act and can be dismantled after it has responded to that act. It can always be returned to the origin, unlike permanent constructions, in which the site remains conditioned.
- Flexibility. The world changes constantly and at an ever-increasing speed. This type of architecture adapts quickly to the needs of the place. It can be constantly re-modeled, as needs change. The permeability of this architecture allows it to be assembled and disassembled by the users themselves. Nowadays any country or city is susceptible to encounter different emergency situations: situations derived from extreme meteorological phenomena, pandemics or moments in which political, military or civil disturbance factors intervene. In this sense, ephemeral architecture has an important task to solve to provide temporary shelters and shelters for victims of any kind, showing its most supportive character.
- Innovation. It is about creating an architecture with innovative solutions in terms of miniaturization, self-construction and new materials. It has been reflected above all in emergency solutions either by wars or natural disasters. Conditions such as lightness, economy, speed and simplicity of assembly and disassembly, storage, sustainability, minimal, collective, transportable, reusable, prefabrication, and so on, require using the most innovative aspect of the architectural research.
- Low cost. Concept generalized in the 60's with the fast food chains. In this consumer society, "low cost" companies of services, communications, industrial, technological, automotive and even airlines have appeared in all media. In the ephemeral architecture, low cost is one of the priority concepts that allows and motivates rapid operations to experiment, investigate and propose models and construction methods that are more advanced and visionary than those that traditional architecture allows us.
- Economy of resources. This type of architecture adapts economically to the needs of the place. It takes into account the existing, either by nearby materials, or by taking into account the environment. Non-permanent architecture should not be exempt from its surroundings. The structural design must be the most appropriate to optimize resources.
- Waste management. There are many economic problems and social problems that make us change the way of doing things. Nowadays, many believe that architecture should optimize resources and be low cost. This can be achieved by using recycled and recyclable materials, with reversible constructions. Once the building is no longer needed the materials can be returned to the company or reused for another construction, avoiding debris.
- Do it yourself. Reversible self-buildings where users can decide what divisions and connections they want to make according to the use they need. It's a counterculture movement transferable to any area of daily life. Although it is also associated with anti-capitalist movements, by rejecting the idea of always buying from others things that one can create or manufacture. From the 1950s, the ability of each person to build his own house is made available to society, supported by the emergence of new materials such as plastics, which are characterized by their lightness and ease of transport, as well as making it possible to simplify the joining of different parts. Each person is the owner of their own environment, their own habitat. It is possible for the individual to become a contemporary nomad. Moreover, the user is the one who decides whether it works and must remain or whether it has finished its task.

== Main authors ==
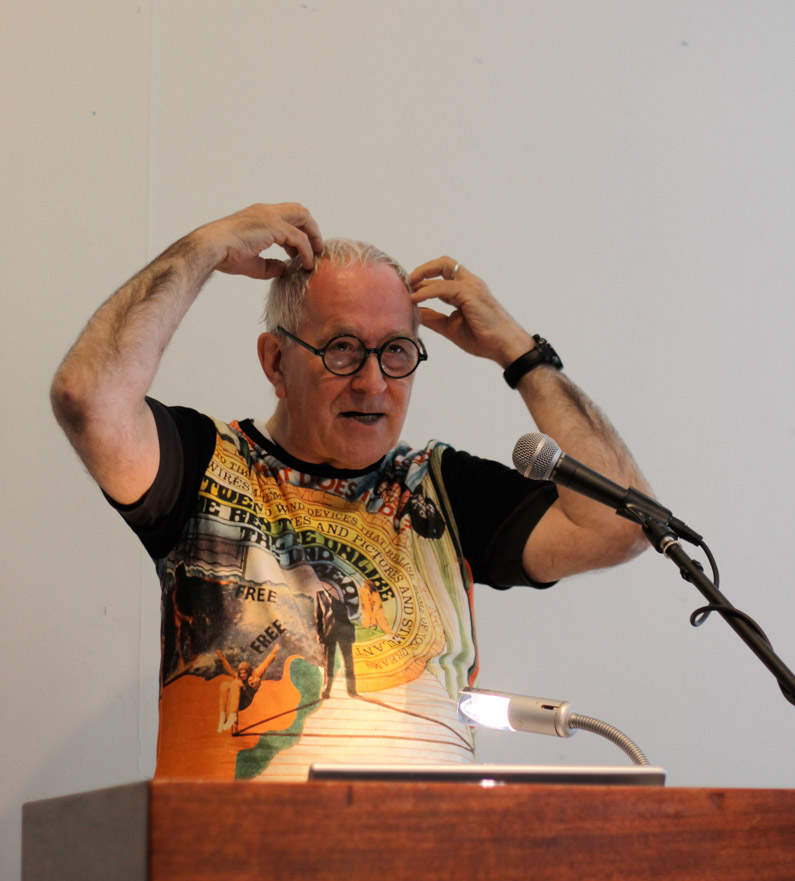
Peter Cook of Archigram, architects association

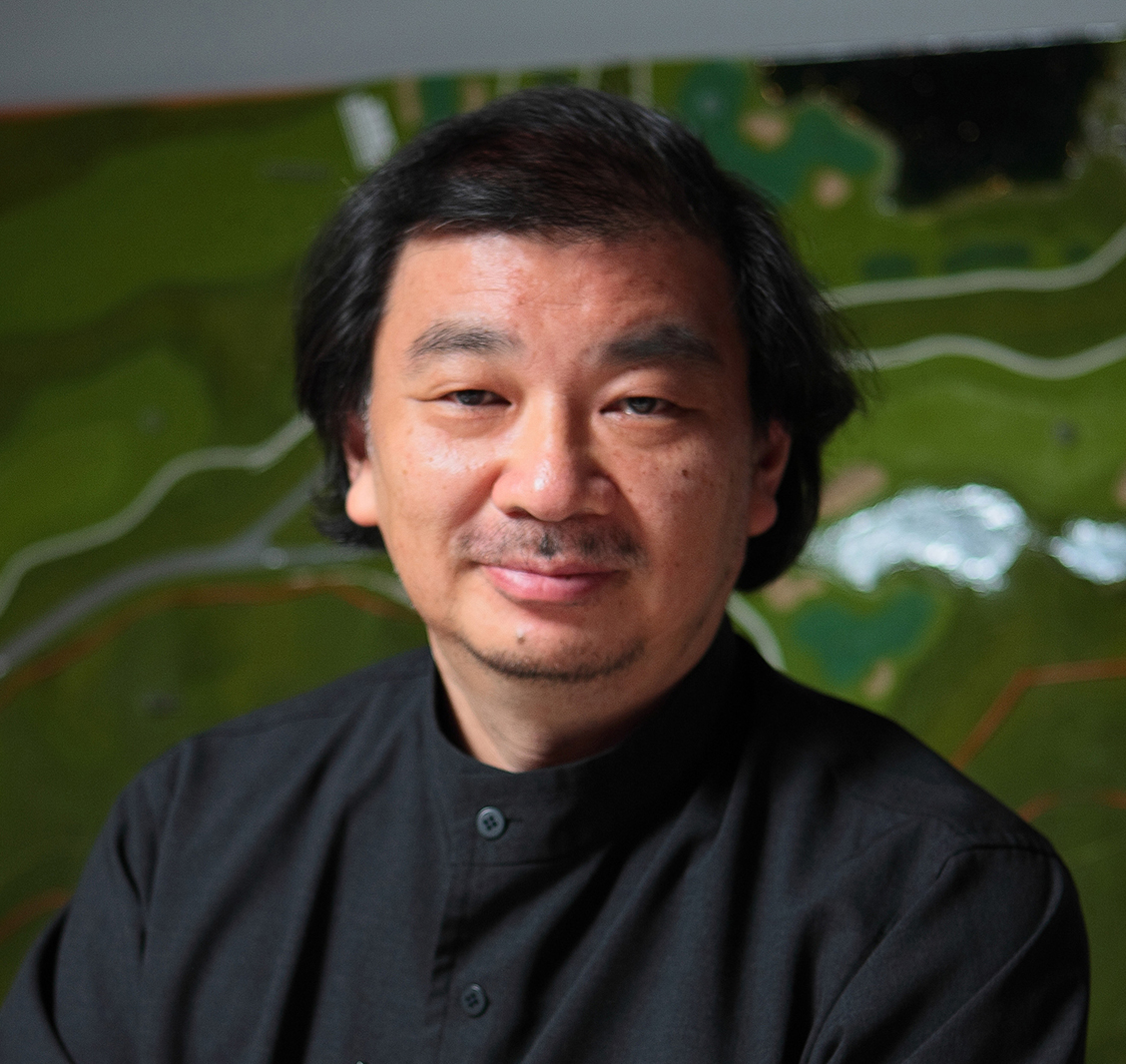
Pompidou Center, Architect Shigeru Ban

=== AntFarm ===
At the end of the 60s in the United States, AntFarm, a collective of architects, philosophers, filmmakers and artists arose that produced numerous performances, audiovisuals, collections of slides such as the enviro-images, television programs clandestine Top Value Television, inflatable architecture manuals like the Inflatocookbook, manifestos like the Nomadic Cowboy, or bound books like Reality, all with the aim of proposing new environments for a new way of life. A proposal with different mobile, inflatable, mechanical and technological elements that produce the necessary effects to make any support habitable with a vital, alternative, nomadic, utopian and experimental architecture, as he believes that "today's ambiguous society forces static patterns of life."

=== Archigram ===
Founded in 1962 by Warren Chalk, Peter Cook, Dennis Crompton, David Greene, Rom Herrom and Michael Webb, Archigram made a series of technological, futuristic and utopian proposals that bet on an ephemeral architecture destined to be consumed like any other product of society.

=== Future Systems ===
Based in England and founded by Jan Kaplický and Amanda Levete, Future Systems propose three technological, mobile, transformable, autonomous, sustainable, capsule, prefabricated, lightweight houses, using solar energy and wind energy. On the one hand, they could be understood as a revision and updating of the fundamental aspects raised from Buckminster Fuller to the generation of the masters of the 60s with whom Kaplicky and Levete were trained, and on the other hand, as visionaries of the world to come from the 21st century.

=== Shigeru Ban ===
Shigeru Ban manages to develop an emergency architecture from the social responsibility of the architect through experimentation and new (old) materials, the low cost, the temporal dimension, the low tech, the existing, the structural design, the waste management, the struggle with regulations, the commitment, participation, flexibility and the rejection of media architecture. Shigeru's houses are designed to be constantly remodeled, as are the needs. They are easy to build, the users themselves can do it.

=== Santiago Cirugeda ===
Santiago Cirugeda is one of the most innovative architects of the Spanish urban scene. His proposals on issues of occupation and resistance have given him international recognition in the field of guerrilla architecture. With his project Recetas Urbanas, he provides legal advice. He makes projects that reflect the idea of ephemeral architecture, these take into account the needs of the individual, the area where it is located and the circumstances of the moment. He defines an economic project, which adapts to demand and can even be self-built. He believes in non-permanent architecture, so many of his projects can be dismantled once it loses the utility for which it was created. In the documentary Spanish Dream, Cirugeda explains his way of understanding architecture:

I have no interest in making architecture that lasts 300 years, but to make an architecture that serves temporary states because there are situations in the city that are developed by people who occasionally, for years, will work there or live there.

== Remarkable works ==
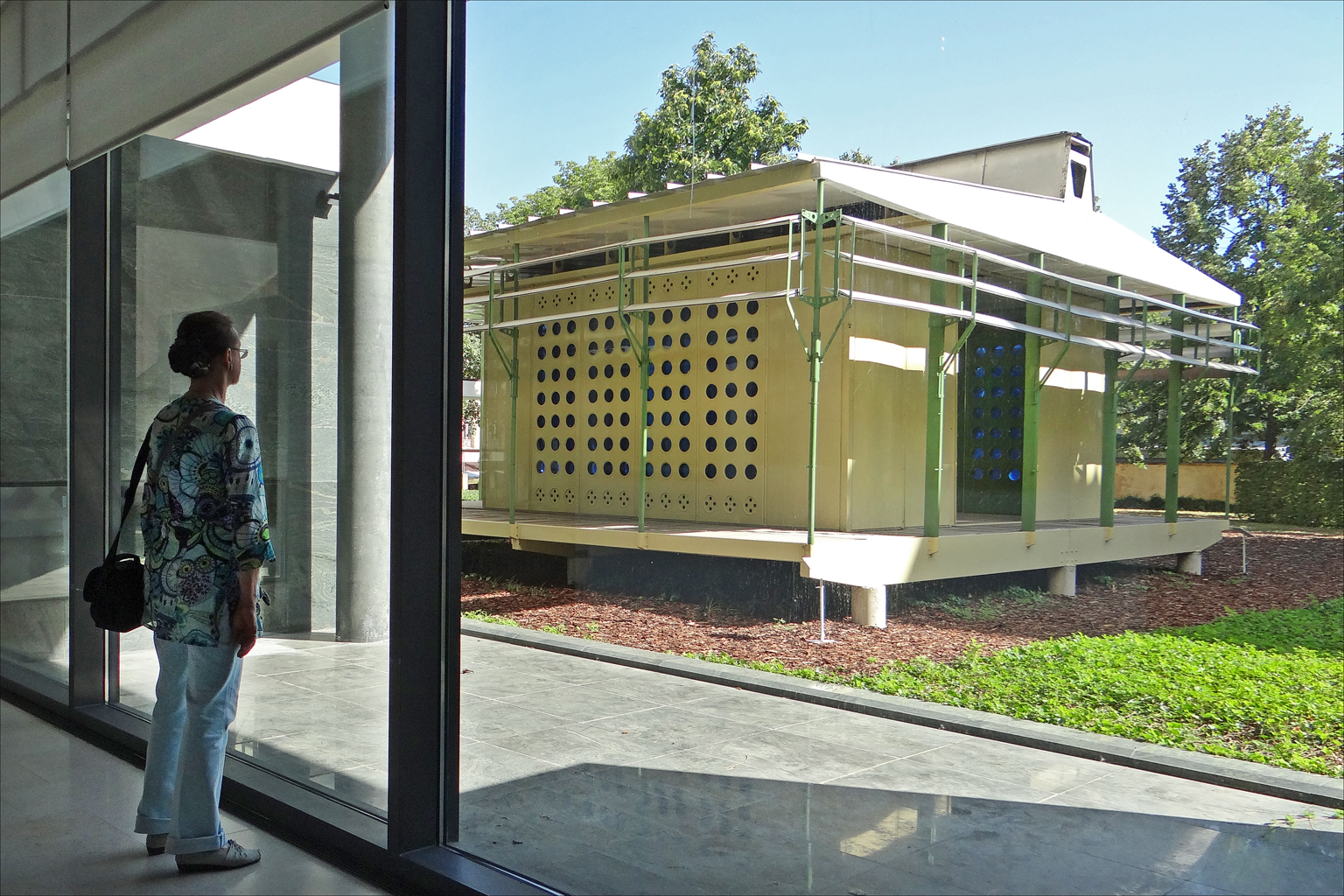
Jean Prouvé's Tropical Houses represent the culmination of his studies on maisons à portiques, easily assembled and disassembled houses that could be mass-produced cheaply.

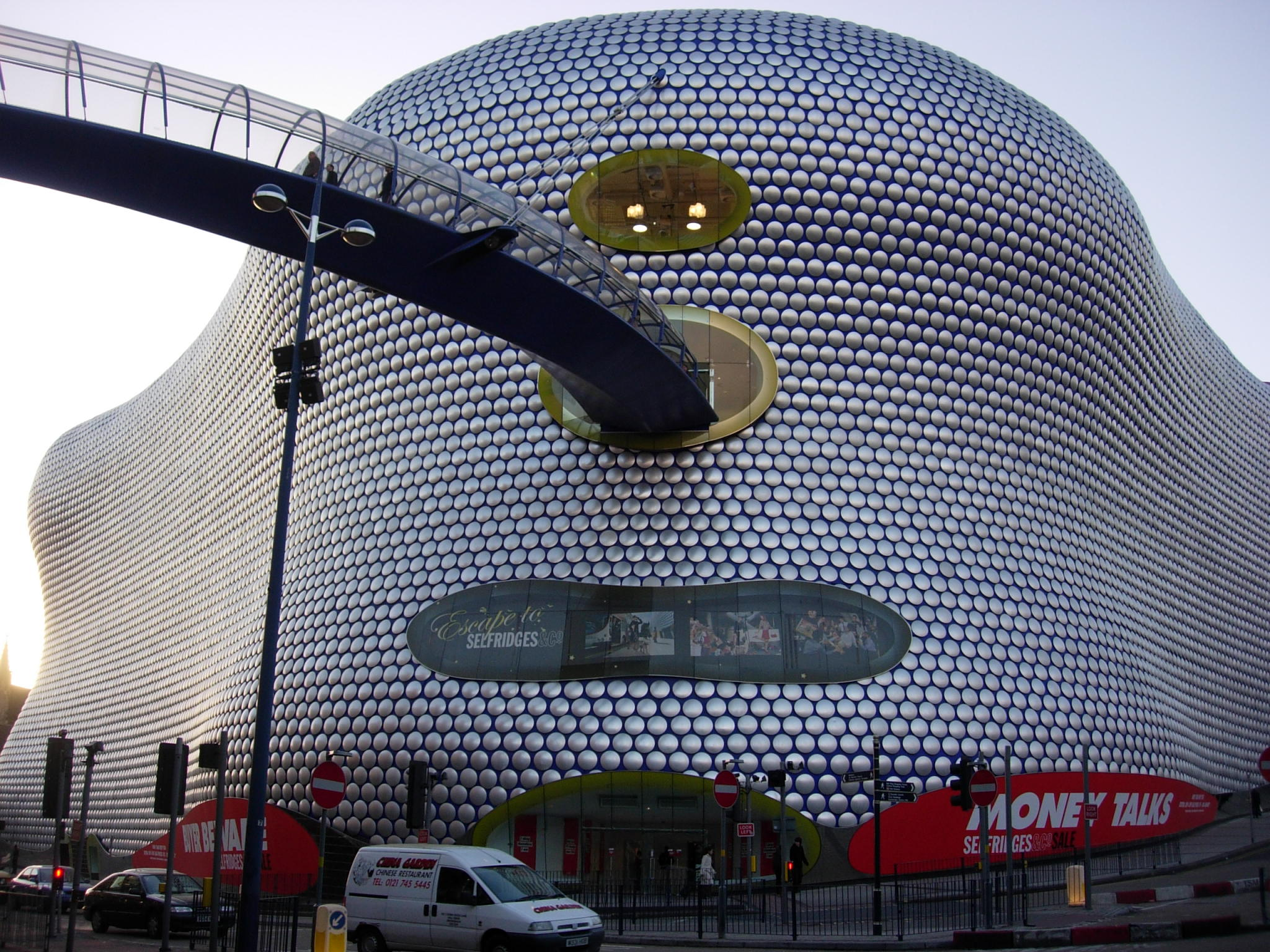
Exterior of Birmingham Selfridges, by Future Systems

=== Endless House. Frederick John Kiesler, 1924 ===
For more than 30 years, the Viennese architect F. J. Kiessler, researched, speculated and experimented in an indeterminate, transformable, self-built, self-supporting, versatile, infinite, mutable and ergonomic architecture. The Endless House project, where the author explored the architectural possibilities of spaces in infinite development, capable of adapting to the changing conditions of the environment, never constant, always evolving, with a biomorphic configuration. The architecture "infinite as the human being, without beginning or end".

=== Detachable house for beach. GATCPAC, 1932 ===
A type of wooden, minimal, self-built, demountable house for the vacation period in Catalonia. The whole house must be manageable: volume, weight, surface and reduced cost. The house can be expandable and is supplied with the indispensable furniture. It is intended to live in harmony with the landscape and nature without damaging the natural environment.

=== Maisons a Portiques. Charlotte Perriand and Le Corbusier, 1945 ===
Together with Jean Prouvé, they designed and produced 400 removable pavilions as temporary housing for casualties after the liberation of France during the Second World War known as Maisons a Portiques. No element had to exceed 100 kilograms or measure more than 4 meters to meet the idea of quick and simple assembly, without technical aids, which could be transported in one go on a truck. The joints and connections had to be free of tension, even in the case of technical deformation; the facades had to be made up of interchangeable elements.

=== Village in cardboard. Guy Rottier, 1960 ===
He proposes new and unprecedented architectures, corresponding to another way of living, combined with the new materials that were beginning to invade the construction market. His proposals deal with the architecture of camouflage, evolutionary, solar, ephemeral, vacation, recovery, etc. In his Village in Cardboard he proposes a vacation village in cardboard cells without doors or windows. All the space is public and does not offer "comfort". The roofs will be generated by the users with the aim that the vacationers are active, relate and communicate with others. The houses would be burned down at the end of the vacation.

=== Plug in city. Archigram, 1962–1966 ===
A megastructure that had no buildings, just a large frame into which housing or service capsules could be fitted in the form of cells or standardized components. Each element had a durability; the base tubular structure 40 years, in the capsules it varies according to its program, from 6 months for a commercial space, to 5–8 years for bedrooms and living rooms. At the top an inflatable balloon is activated in bad weather.

=== Living Pod. David Greene, Archigram, 1966 ===
It is a habitat-capsule that can be inserted inside an urban structure called plug-in, or it can be transported and perched on any natural landscape. A hybrid architecture, hermetic, small, comfortable and technological, constituted by the space itself and by the machines connected to it: "The house is an apparatus to be transported with itself, the city is a machine to which you connect." Although comparable to a capsule, the Living Pod does not have autonomy, that is why in 1969 he proposed the Logplug-Rockplug. Real simulations of logs and rocks that serve to hide service points for semi-autonomous living containers. They go unnoticed, perfectly adapted to the landscape and bring to any environment a high degree of technological support without detracting from the natural beauty.

=== Peanut. Future Systems, 1984 ===
A rural shelter designed for mounting on a standard articulated hydraulic boom. Accommodating two occupants, the amphibious unit is capable of traversing land, water, and air depending on operational requirements. It is a kinetic response to life, allowing the inhabitants to control the appearance or orientation of the capsule according to mood, activity and time, leaving behind the fixed viewpoint of static dwellings.

=== Pao 1 and 2 of the nomadic girls of Tokyo. Toyo Ito, 1989 ===
A project from the mid-1980s, consisting of a concept of a house scattered all over the city, where life goes by while using the fragments of the city space as a collage. For it, the living room is the café-bar and the theater, the dining room is the restaurant, the closet is the boutique, and the garden is the sports club.

=== Casa Básica. Martín Ruiz de Azúa, 1999 ===
Proposal that aims to demonstrate that the habitat can be understood in a more essential and reasonable way, keeping a more direct relationship with the environment. An almost immaterial volume that swells from the heat of our own body or the sun, so versatile that it protects from cold and heat, so light that it floats.

=== Pink Project. Graph Architects, 2008 ===
Produced by the Make It Right Foundation. It was conceived as an informative-commemorative tool to raise awareness and activate individual participation to alleviate the needs of those affected by Hurricane Katrina in New Orleans. Thousands of people were left unprotected and homeless, and the objective was to raise funds for the reconstruction of the devastated homes. Given the strong visual and metaphorical potential of installing a village of pink "houses" in the devastated area, Pink was the virtual city of hope, a hybrid of art, architecture, film, media and fundraising strategies.

=== Paper Log House. Shigeru Ban, 1955 ===
For the victims of the Kobe earthquake. These emergency housing units have been built on two more occasions, in Turkey in 2000 and India in 2001. Self-built with maximum economy of means, they use sand-filled soft drink boxes as foundations, and walls constructed of cardboard tubes with insulating capacity and rain-resistant once protected with a kerosene primer. The tarpaulin roof, attached to a cardboard truss, can be removed and detached in summer to allow ventilation. The material cost of a 52 m^{2} unit is less than $2,000, and the assembly is designed to be carried out by the victims and volunteers themselves. Emergency housing took between 6 and 10 hours to build.

== See also ==
- Ephemeral art
- Spanish Baroque ephemeral architecture
- Spanish Baroque painting
- Tactical urbanism
