= Sebastián Herrera =

Sebastián Herrera may refer to:

- Sebastián Herrera (basketball), Chilean-German basketball player
- Sebastián Herrera (footballer, born 1969), Spanish football defender
- Sebastián Herrera (footballer, born 1995), North Macedonia international footballer
- Sebastián Herrera Barnuevo, Spanish painter, architect, sculptor and etcher
- Juan Sebastián Herrera (born 1994), Colombian football forward
