= Baroque (disambiguation) =

The Baroque period was from the 17th century.

Baroque may also refer to:

== Of the Baroque period ==
- Baroque architecture
- Baroque music
- Baroque painting
- Baroque sculpture

=== By region ===
- Andean Baroque
- Chinese Baroque
- Ukrainian Baroque
- Dutch Baroque
- English Baroque
- Flemish Baroque
- French Baroque
- Naryshkin Baroque
- New Spanish Baroque
- Polish Baroque
- Sicilian Baroque
- Spanish Baroque (disambiguation)
- Stalinist baroque
- Ukrainian Baroque

== Music ==
- Baroque (band)
- Baroque (Junko Onishi album)
- Baroque, 2008 album by Gabriela Montero
- "Baroque", a song by Malice Mizer
- "Baroque", a song by Joe Satriani on his album Time Machine

== Comics and games ==
- Baroque (manga), a post-apocalyptic survival horror manga
- Baroque Works, a criminal organization in the manga series One Piece
- Baroque (video game), a 1998 RPG video game
- Baroque chess, a chess variant

== Other uses ==
- Baroque (grape), a French wine grape
- Baroque pearl, a pearl of an irregular shape

== See also ==
- Neo-Baroque (disambiguation)
- Post-Baroque
