= Spanish Baroque ephemeral architecture =

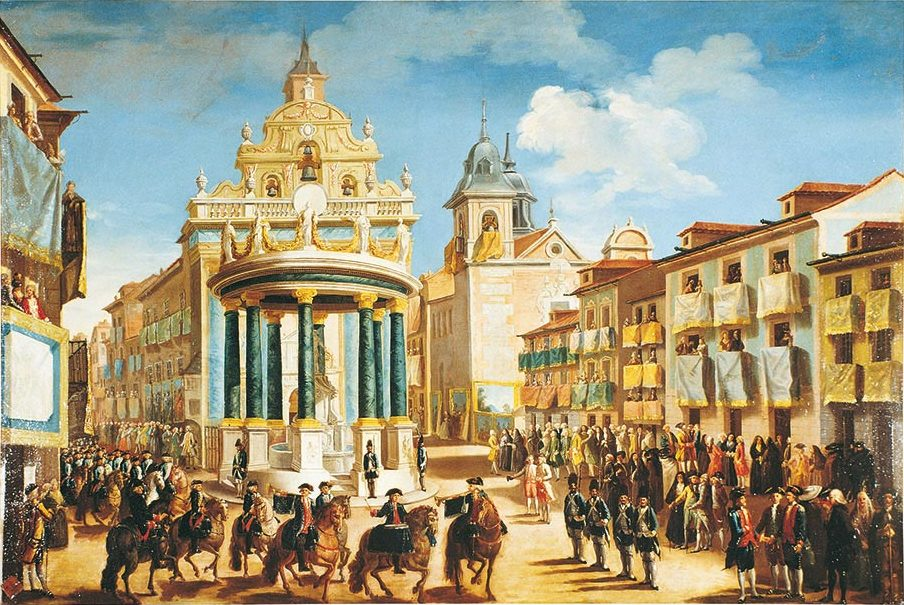
The king Charles III entry in Madrid (1759), oil painting by Lorenzo Quirós.

Ephemeral architecture had a special relevance in the Spanish Baroque, as it fulfilled diverse aesthetic, political, religious and social functions. On the one hand, it was an indispensable component of support for architectural achievements, carried out in a perishable and transitory way, which allowed a cheapening of materials and a way to capture new designs and more daring and original solutions of the new Baroque style, which could not be done in conventional constructions. On the other hand, its volubility made possible the creation of a wide range of productions designed according to their diverse functionality: triumphal arches for the reception of kings and aristocratic personages, catafalques for religious ceremonies, burial mounds for funerary ceremonies and diverse scenarios for social or religious events, such as the feast of Corpus Christi or Holy Week.

These works were usually profusely decorated and developed an iconographic program that emphasized the power of the ruling classes of the time, both political and religious: in the political sphere it exalted the omnipotent power of the absolutist monarchy, while in the religious sphere it praised the spiritual dominion of the Counter-Reformation Church. They used to have a high propagandistic component, as vehicles of ostentation of these ruling classes, so they were mainly addressed to the people—that were the recipients of these grand ceremonies and spectacles.

Although there are no material remains of this type of performance, they are known thanks to drawings and engravings, as well as literary accounts of the time, which described them in great detail. Many writers and chroniclers devoted themselves to this type of descriptions, even giving rise to a new literary genre, the "Chronicle."

== The Baroque: a culture of image ==
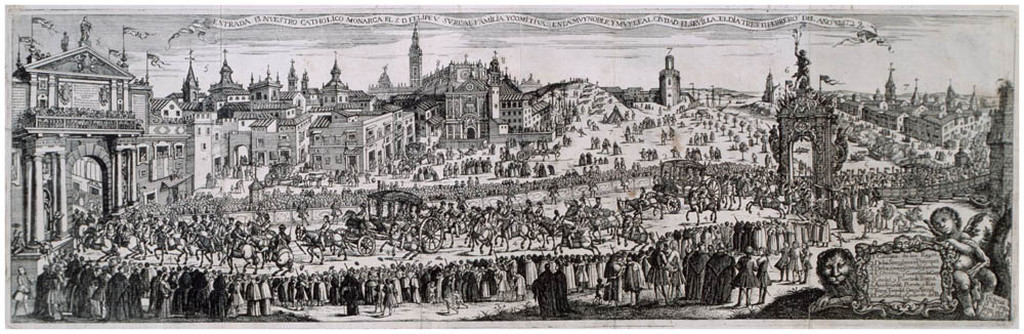
Entry of King Philip V of Spain into Seville (1729), engraving by Pedro Tortolero.

Architecture is the art and technique of constructing buildings, of designing spaces and volumes with a utilitarian purpose, mainly housing, but also various constructions of a social, civil or religious nature. Space, when modified by human beings, is transmuted, acquires a new meaning, a new perception, thus acquiring a cultural dimension, while taking on an aesthetic significance, as it is perceived in an intellectualized and artistic way, as an expression of socio-cultural values inherent to each people and culture. This aesthetic character can give the space an ephemeral component, as it is used in public acts and celebrations, rituals, festivals, markets, shows, religious ceremonies, official acts, political events, etc.

In the Baroque, the arts converged to create a total work of art, with a theatrical aesthetic, scenography, a mise-en-scène that highlighted the splendor of the dominant power (Church or State). The interaction of all the arts expressed the use of visual language as a means of mass communication, embodied in a dynamic conception of nature and surrounding space, in a culture of the image.

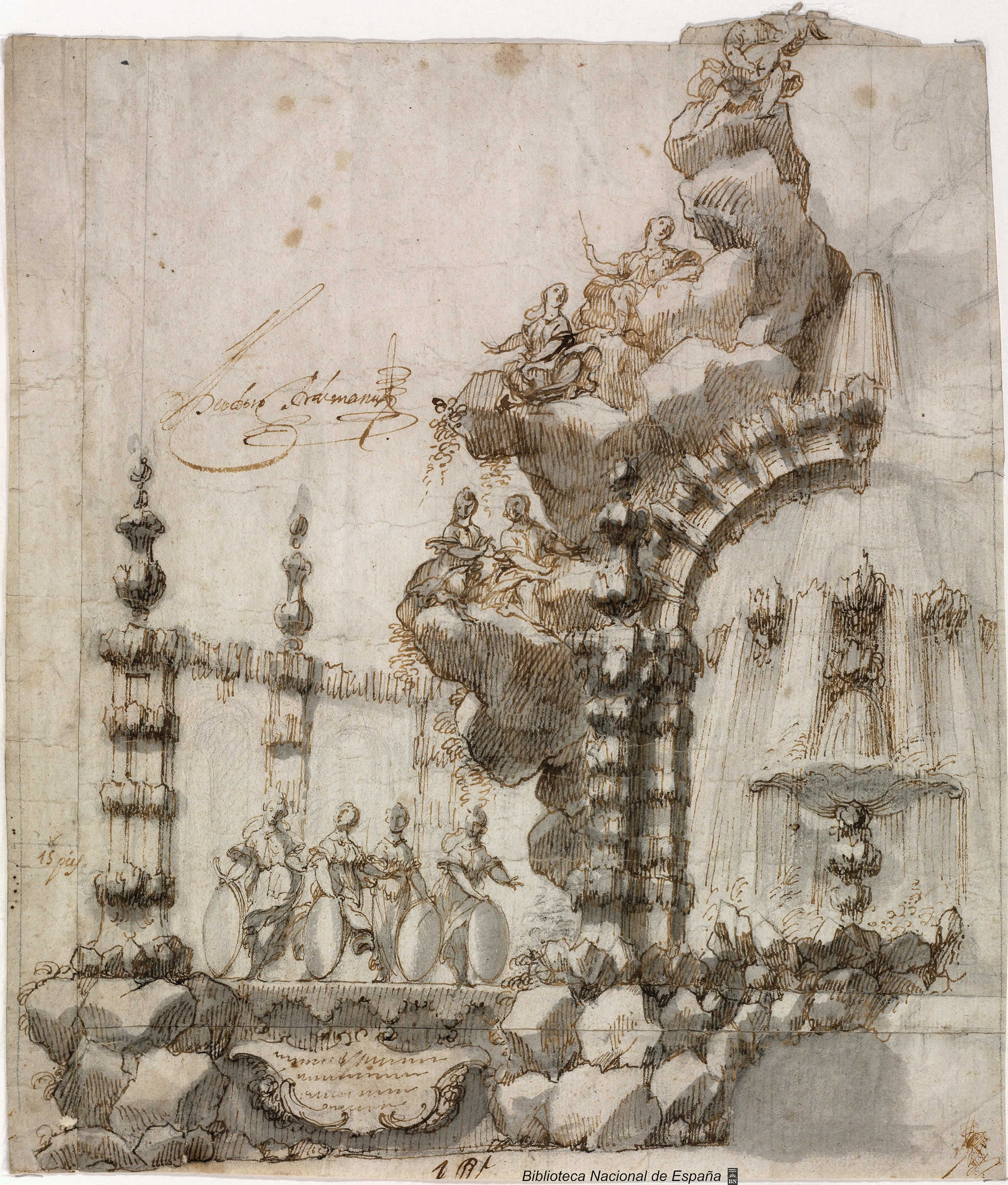
Monte Parnassus, ephemeral decoration project on the occasion of the entry of Philip V in Madrid (1701), by Teodoro Ardemans.

One of the main characteristics of Baroque art is its illusory and contrived character: "ingenuity and design are the magic art through which one manages to deceive the eye to the point of astonishment". The visual and ephemeral were especially valued, so the theater and the various genres of performing arts and shows were booming: dance, pantomime, musical drama (oratorio and melodrama), puppet shows, acrobatics, circuses, etc. There was a feeling that the world is a theater (theatrum mundi) and life a theatrical performance: "all the world is a stage, and all men and women mere actors" (As You Like It, William Shakespeare, 1599). Similarly there was a tendency to theatricalize the other arts, especially architecture. It was an art based on the inversion of reality: on "simulation", on turning the false into the true, and on "dissimulation", passing off the true as false. Things are not shown as they are, but as one would like them to be, especially in the Catholic world, where the Counter-Reformation had a meager success, since half of Europe turned to Protestantism. In literature, it manifested itself by giving free rein to rhetorical artifice, as a means of propagandistic expression in which the sumptuousness of language sought to reflect reality in a sweetened form, resorting to rhetorical figures such as metaphor, paradox, hyperbole, antithesis, hyperbaton, ellipsis, etc. This transposition of reality, which is distorted and magnified, altered in its proportions and subjected to the subjective criterion of fiction, was also applied to painting, where foreshortening and illusionist perspective are abused for the sake of greater, striking and surprising effects.

Baroque Art sought to create an alternative reality through fiction and illusion. This tendency had its maximum expression in festivity and playful celebration. Buildings such as churches or palaces, or a neighborhood or an entire city, became theaters of life, stages where reality and illusion were mixed, where the senses were subjected to deception and artifice. In this aspect, the Counter-Reformation Church played a special role, seeking to show its superiority over the Protestant churches through pomp and pageantry, with events such as solemn Mass, canonizations, Jubilees, processions or papal investitures. But just as lavish were the celebrations of the monarchy and the aristocracy, with events such as coronations, royal weddings and births, funerals, military victories, ambassadorial visits or any event that allowed the monarch to display his power to the admiration of the people. Baroque festivities involved a conjugation of all the arts, from architecture and plastic arts to poetry, music, dance, theater, pyrotechnics, floral arrangements, water games, etc. Architects such as Bernini or Pietro da Cortona, or Alonso Cano and Sebastián Herrera Barnuevo in Spain, contributed their talent to such events, designing structures, choreographies, lighting and other elements, which often served as a testing ground for future, more serious endeavors.

During the Baroque, the ornamental, contrived and ornate character of the art of this time conveyed a transitory sense of life, related to the memento mori, the ephemeral value of riches in the face of the inevitability of death, in parallel to the pictorial genre of the vanitas. This sentiment led to a vitalist appreciation of the fleetingness of the instant, to enjoy the light moments of relaxation that life offers, or the celebrations and solemn acts. Thus, births, weddings, deaths, religious ceremonies, royal coronations and other recreational or ceremonial events, were invested with a pomp and artifice of a scenographic nature, where large assemblies were developed that brought together architecture and decorations to provide an eloquent magnificence to any celebration, which became a show almost catartic, where the illusory element, the attenuation of the border between reality and fantasy, was especially relevant.

== Spanish Baroque architecture ==
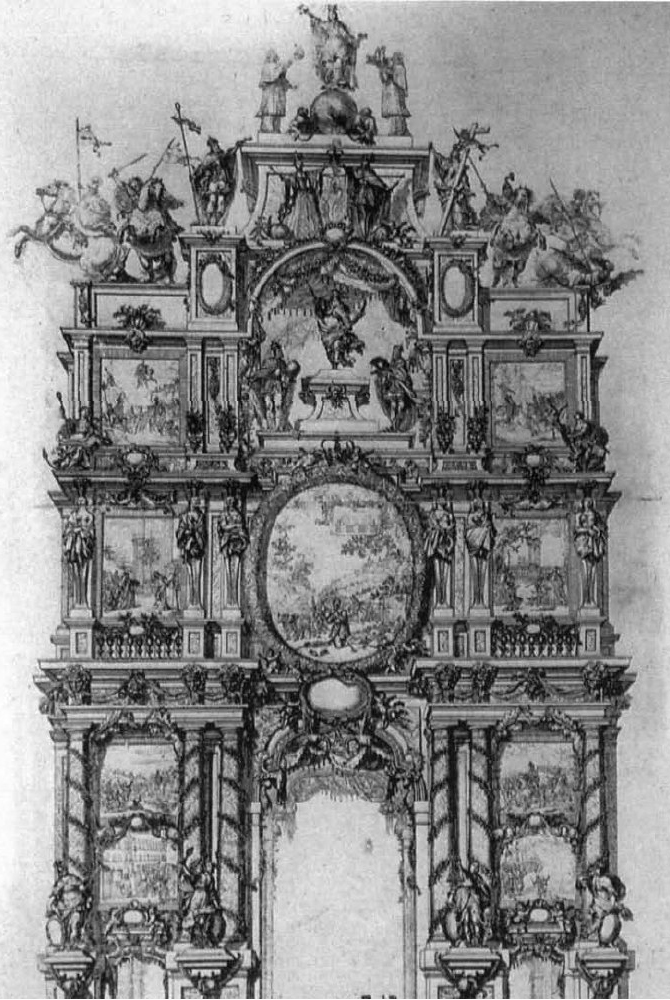
Triumphal Arch for the arrival of Marie Louise d'Orléans to Madrid (1680), work of Matías de Torres.

In Spain, the architecture of the first half of the 17th century showed the herrerian architecture heritage, with an austerity and geometric simplicity influenced by escurialense style. The Baroque was gradually introduced, especially in the ornate interior decoration of churches and palaces, where the retables evolved towards ever higher levels of magnificence. In this period it was Juan Gómez de Mora the most outstanding figure, with achievements such as La Clerecía of Salamanca (1617), the Casa de la Villa (1644–1702) and the Plaza Mayor (1617–1619). Other architects of the period were Alonso Carbonel, author of the Buen Retiro Palace (1630–1640), or Pedro Sánchez and Francisco Bautista, authors of the Collegiate church of San Isidro (1620–1664).

Towards the middle of the century, richer forms and freer and more dynamic volumes were gaining ground, with naturalistic decorations (garlands, vegetal cartouches) or abstract forms (moldings and trimmed baquetons, generally of mixtilinear form). The names of Pedro de la Torre, José de Villarreal, José del Olmo, Sebastián Herrera Barnuevo and, especially, Alonso Cano, author of the façade of the Cathedral of Granada (1667) should be mentioned.

Between the end of the century and the beginning of the 18th century, the churrigueresque style (by the Churriguera brothers) appeared, characterized by its exuberant decorativism and the use of Solomonic columns: José Benito Churriguera was the author of the High Altarpiece of Convento de San Esteban (1692) and the facade of the Goyeneche Palace (1709–1722); Alberto Churriguera designed the Plaza Mayor of Salamanca (1728–1735); and Joaquín de Churriguera was the author of the Colegio de Calatrava (1717) and the cloister of San Bartolomé (1715) in Salamanca, of plateresque influence. Other figures of the period were: Teodoro Ardemans, author of the facade of the Madrid City Hall and the first project for the Royal Palace of La Granja de San Ildefonso (1718–1726); Pedro de Ribera, author of the Bridge of Toledo (1718–1732), the Cuartel del Conde-Duque (1717) and the facade of the Our Lady of Montserrat Church in Madrid (1720); Narciso Tomé, author El Transparente (1721–1734); the German Konrad Rudolf, author of the façade of the Valencia Cathedral (1703); Jaime Bort, architect of the façade of the Murcia Cathedral (1736–1753); Vicente Acero, who designed the Cádiz Cathedral (1722–1762); and Fernando de Casas Novoa, author of the facade of the obradoiro of the Santiago de Compostela Cathedral (1739–1750).

== Ephemerality in the Spanish Baroque architecture ==
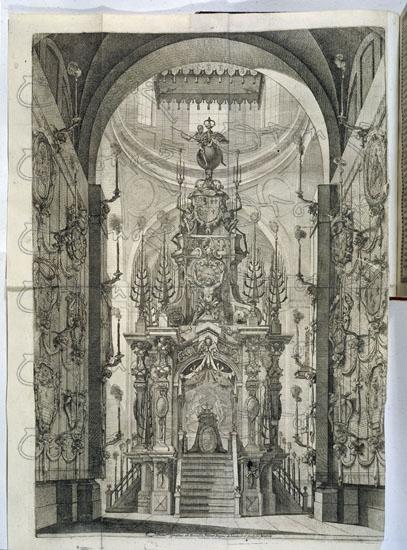
Catafalque for the funeral of Marie Louise d'Orléans in the church of the Royal Monastery of La Encarnación (1689), work of José Benito de Churriguera.

The splendor of ephemeral architecture was produced in the Early modern period, in the Renaissance and—especially—the Baroque, eras of consolidation of the absolute monarchy, when European monarchs sought to elevate their figure above that of their subjects, resorting to all kinds of propagandistic and exalting acts of their power, in political and religious ceremonies or celebrations of playful character, which showed the magnificence of their government.

Although this period was one of a certain political and economic decadence, in the cultural sphere it was one of great splendor—the so-called Spanish Golden Age—with a magnificent flowering of literature and the arts. On the other hand, although in the political field the monarchy was resolutely authoritarian, the way of governing showed a strong populist component; while in the religious field, strict faith was combined with a realistic and critical vision of the world. These elements contributed to the desire for an art close to the people, which would easily and directly show the moral and ideological aspects that the ruling classes wanted to transmit to their subjects. Thus, according to the historian José Antonio Maravall, Baroque art and culture was "directed", since its objective was communication; "massive", since it was aimed at the people; and "conservative", since it sought to perpetuate traditional values.

These distractions helped the populace to cope with their hardships: according to Jerónimo de Barrionuevo, "bien son menester estos divertimentos para poder llevar tantas adversidades." (English: "these diversions are necessary to be able to bear so many adversities.") This evasion of reality leads Antonio Bonet Correa to describe this period as "utopian space and time", since it is only a temporary relief from the harsh reality of the majority of the population, submerged in misery.

Ephemeral architecture was generally made with poor and perishable materials, such as wood, cardboard, cloth, stucco, cane, paper, grey-leaved cistus, lime or scagliola, which were nevertheless enhanced by the monumentality of the works and by their original and fanciful designs, as well as by the sumptuousness of the ornamental decoration. These were works in which architecture, sculpture, painting and the decorative arts all took part, and where scenography was especially important. It could be performed both inside buildings—generally religious temples—and in the streets of towns and cities, through numerous constructive typologies, such as triumphal arches, castles, porticos, tempiettos, catafalques, pavilions, galleries, colonnades, loggias, aediculae, pyramids, obelisks, pedestals, baldachins, fly systems, altars, dossals, etc. Sculptures, tapestries, canvases and paintings were also relevant; the latter often represented feigned architectures or landscapes, being common the representation of "parnassuss", mountains with vegetation, rivers and fountains in which gods, muses and historical characters were depicted. Other decorative elements were floral tapestries, garlands, cornucopias, mirrors, candelabras, shields, and flags. In addition to all this, we must take into account mobile elements such as carriages or processions, retinues and retinues, masquerades, mojigangas, juegos de cañas and auto-da-fé, as well as other elements such as fireworks, bullfights, naumachias, jousting and mock war, music, dance, theater and other genres of spectacle.

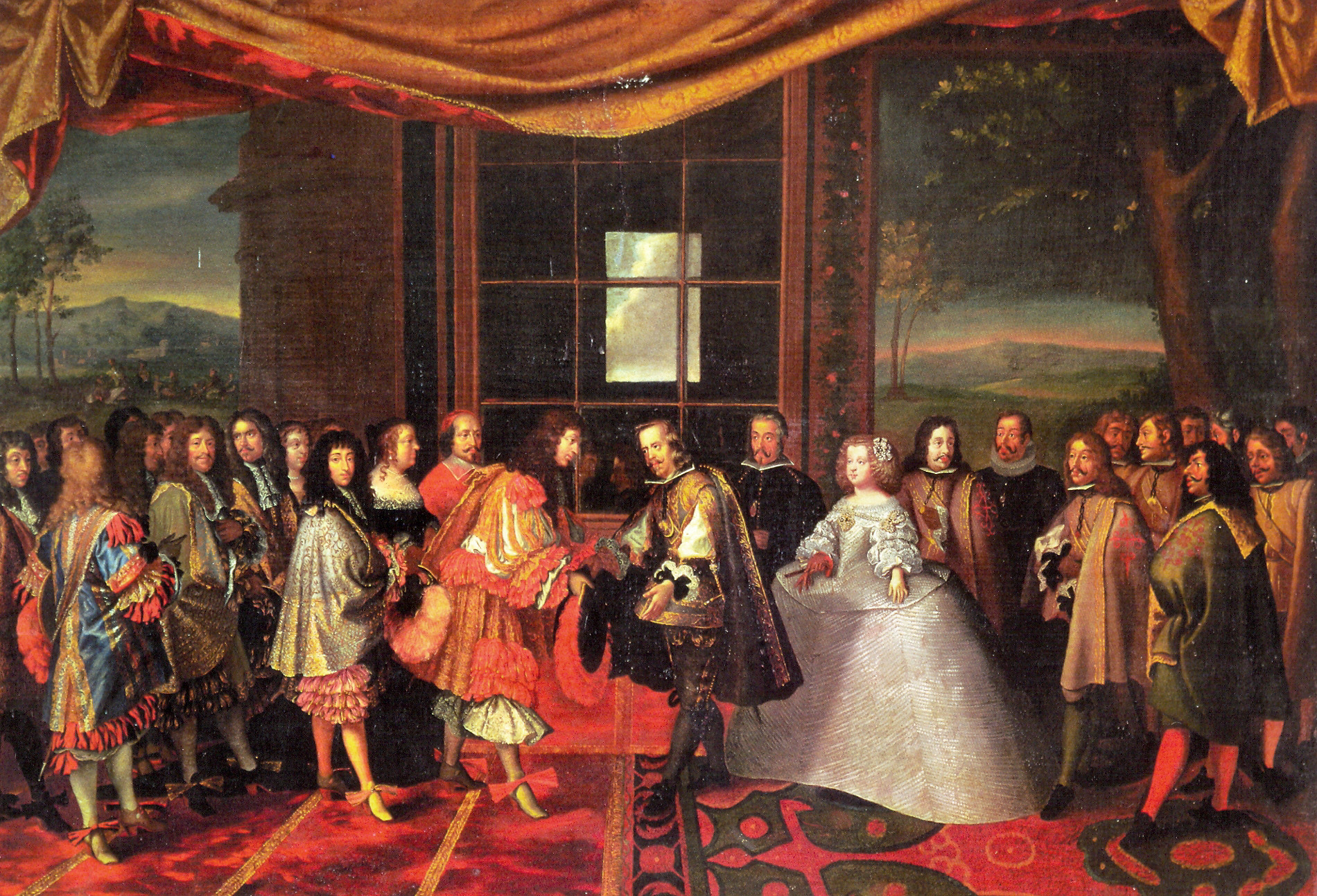
Interview between Louis XIV and Philip IV at Pheasant Island (1659), with ephemeral structures designed by Diego Velázquez.

Perhaps the most emblematic element of Baroque ephemeral architecture was the funeral tumulus, since it signified more than any other the conception of the transitory, the transience of life, which translates into the transience of the party, of the ephemeral celebration. The funeral pomps represent, as well as the ephemeral architecture, the chance, the emptiness, the fleeting of the existence, opposing the corporeal temporality to the immortality of the soul. For this reason, references to death are frequent in the decoration of burial mounds and catafalques, through skeletons, skulls, hourglasses, candles and other elements alluding to the end of human existence. The typological evolution of the burial mounds derived from the monument-type catafalques inherited from mannerist Renaissance to the pyre-type catafalques of the full Baroque, with a turriform plan and domed temple, deriving towards the end of the Baroque into baldachin-type catafalques; by the end of the 18th century they would evolve into the obelisk-type catafalque, of neoclassical style. Burial mounds were reserved for the royal family, until 1696 when Charles II approved their opening to members of the aristocracy and the ecclesiastical hierarchy.

Many architects used ephemeral architecture as a test bed for original and bolder formulas and solutions than in conventional architecture, which they then tested in stable constructions, with the result that this modality helped powerfully in the progress of Spanish architecture. Some of the most renowned architects carried out this type of work, such as Juan Gómez de Mora, Pedro de la Torre, José Benito Churriguera, Alonso Cano, José del Olmo and Sebastián Herrera Barnuevo. Even renowned artists intervened in this type of work, such as El Greco, in the design of the tomb of Margaret of Austria-Styria (1612); Rubens, in the entrance of the cardinal-infante Ferdinand of Austria at Antwerp in 1635; Velázquez, in the decoration of the betrothal of Louis XIV and Maria Theresa of Spain, at Pheasant Island (1660); or Murillo, in the celebration of the Immaculate Conception in Seville (1665).

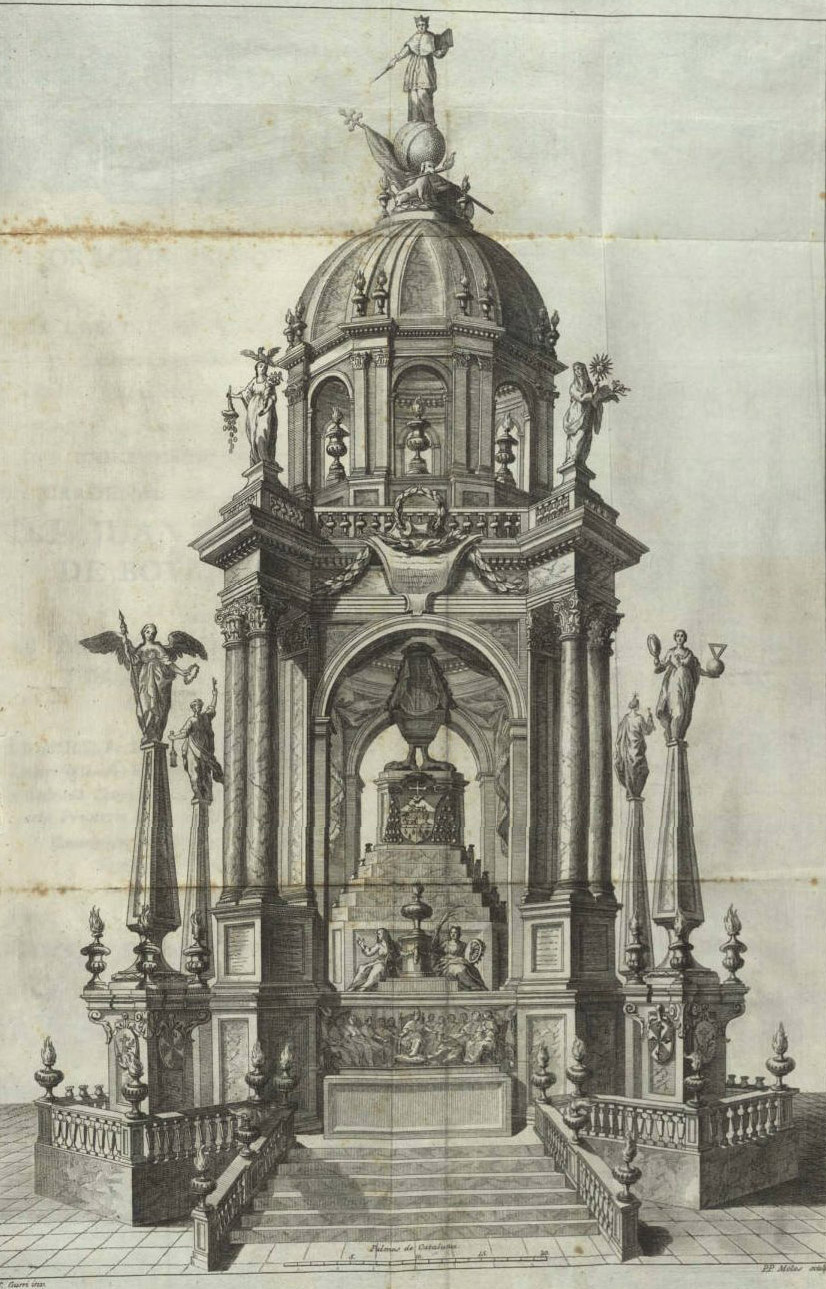
Tumulus of Cardinal Juan Tomás de Boxadors, convent of Santa Catalina (Barcelona, Spain), by Salvador Gurri (1781); engraving by Pere Pasqual Moles.

Any event was suitable for the ephemeral celebration: the monarchs celebrated in a lavish way every relevant event in their lives, such as births, baptisms, onomastics, weddings, enthronement ceremonies, visits to cities, military victories, diplomatic agreements, funerals, etc. As for religious celebrations, those of Corpus Christi and Holy Week, celebrated with processions, via crucis, rogativas, autos sacramentales, where large stage sets were usually set up for the festivities, and along with the religious processions, folkloric elements such as masks, mojigones, fanfares, giants and big-heads were added. Also part of the ephemeral celebrations were the so-called "Holy Week Monuments" that were mounted with great pomposity inside temples and churches—the case of the Cathedral of Seville is the most paradigmatic example in the Baroque period. Other celebrations were motivated by specific acts, generally canonizations, such as those of Louis Bertrand in 1608, Francisco Xavier, Ignatius of Loyola, Isidore the Laborer and Teresa of Ávila in 1622, Tomás de Villanueva in 1658, Francis Borgia in 1671 or Paschal Baylón in 1690; or pontifical decrees, such as the brief of Alexander VII in which he recognized the Immaculate Conception of the Virgin (1662). Of particular significance was the canonization of Ferdinand III in 1671, since it brought together Church and monarchy in the same interest, combining the values of the ruling classes of the Ancien Régime.

The patronage of the monarchy and the Church entailed a certain support to professionals of architecture, plastic and decorative arts and craftsmanship, who thus counted on labor commissions in a time of economic crisis in which there was scarce work at the civil level. On the other hand, ephemeral architecture reached a level of popularity that gave great prestige to the professional who carried it out. Thus the competition held for the awarding of the obsequies of Marie Louise d'Orléans in 1689, won by a previously unknown José Benito de Churriguera, served the latter to launch his professional career with great success.

There are no material remains of these ephemeral events, and they are only known through engravings and drawings, and written accounts that described in detail all the details of these celebrations. Such accounts gave rise to a new literary genre, that of the "chronicle", which have as their main reference point Juan Calvete de Estrella, author of El túmulo Imperial, adornado de historias y letreros y epitaphios en prosa y verso latino (1559). This literature abounded in meticulous descriptions of the events celebrated by the monarchy and the Church, with special emphasis on symbolic elements, often embodied in hieroglyphs and shields, whose mottos, generally in Latin, they translated into Spanish in verse. On the other hand, these chronicles did not fail to reveal the political, social and moral values that the powerful personages who sponsored these lavish events were championing.

In the 18th century, the same festive typologies continued, as the Bourbons maintained the same protocols and repertoires of celebrations and solemnities. The evolution in ephemeral architectures was mainly stylistic, especially from the first third of the century, when the encouragement of the Real Academia de Bellas Artes de San Fernando promoted the classicist lines, in a movement that would be baptized as neoclassicism. On the other hand, the rise of the Enlightenment led to a decrease in the number of large-scale religious festivities of a counter-reformist nature. The new events had a more didactic character, with a clearer distinction between the sacred and the profane, and music and opera became more important.

== Main creations ==
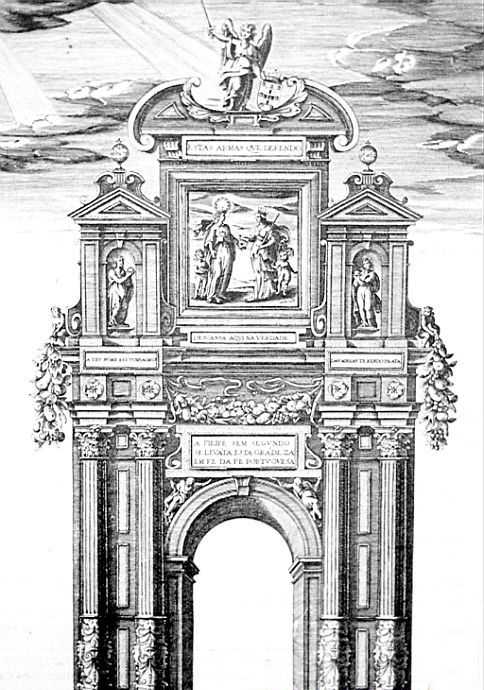
Triumphal Arch for the arrival of Philip III to Lisbon (1619).

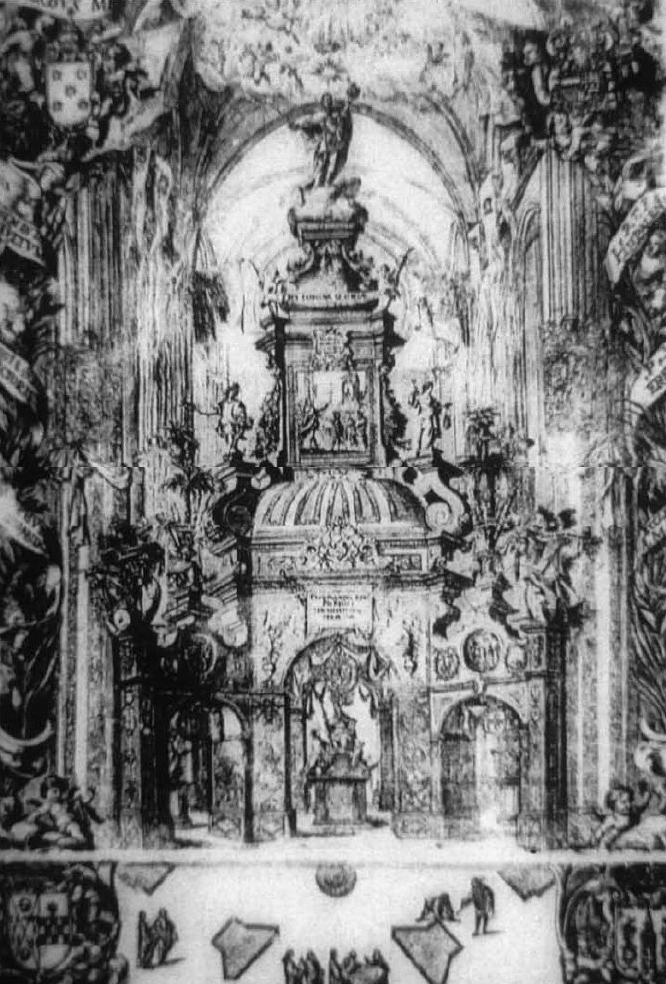
Monument to the Triumph of Saint Ferdinand in the backchamber of the Cathedral of Seville (1671), work of Bernardo Simón de Pineda.

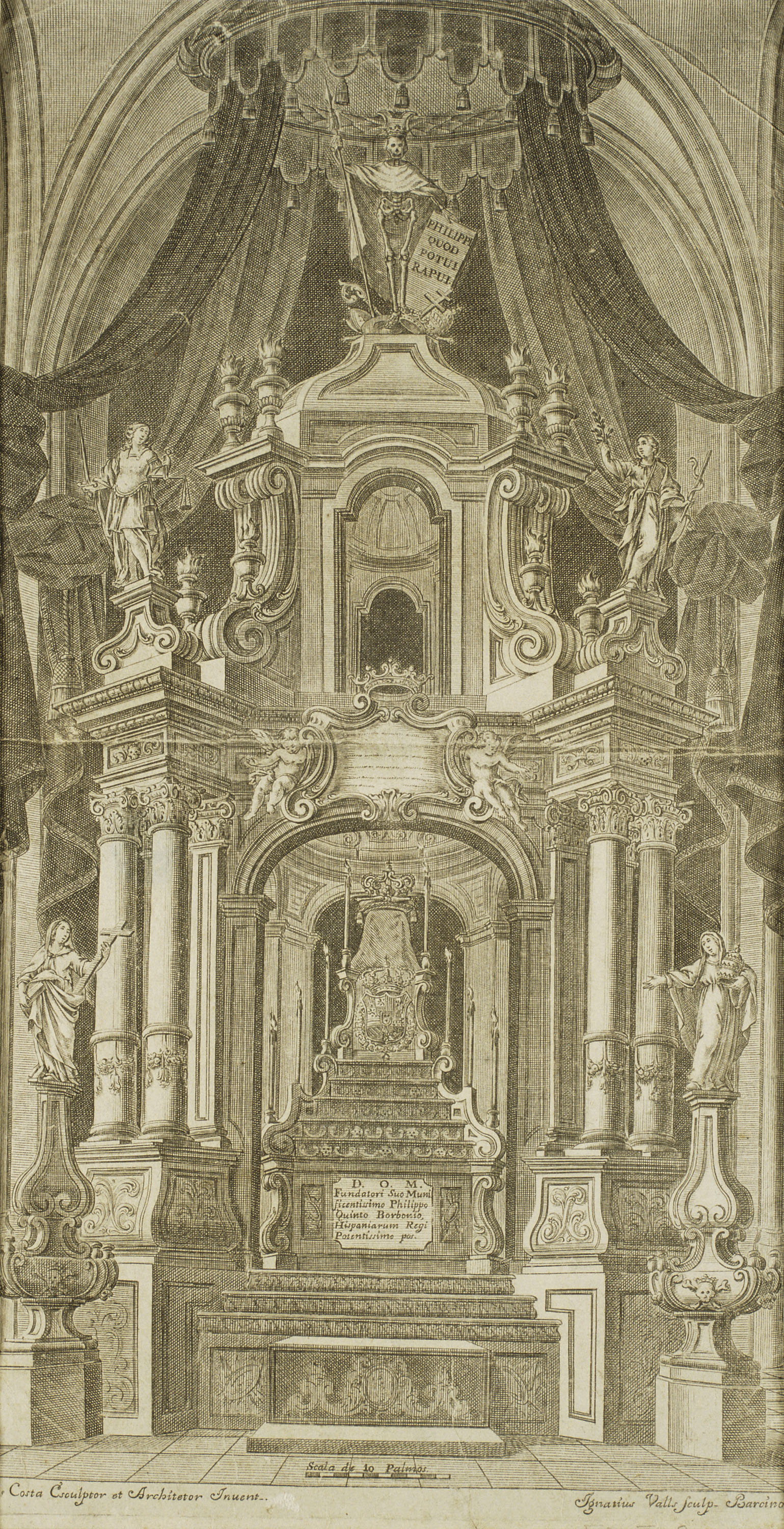
Tumulus of Philip V at the University of Cervera (1746), engraving by Ignacio Valls from a drawing by Pere Costa.

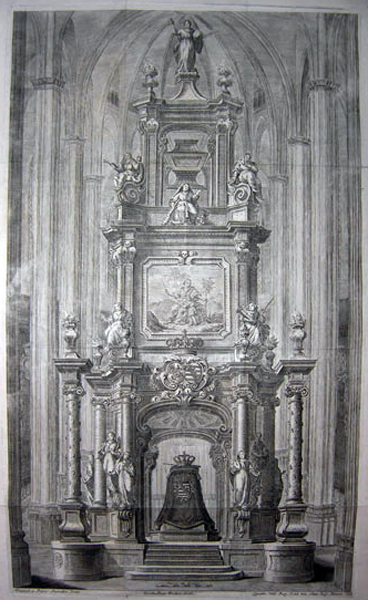
Tumulus of Queen Maria Amalia in the Cathedral of Barcelona, Spain (1761), work of Manuel and Francesc Tramulles.
- Entrance of Philip III in Lisbon (1619): it was honored with the construction of thirteen triumphal arches, paid for by the guilds of the city, decorated with mythological gods and heroes, allegorical figures and literary references taken from classical authors such as Ovid or Virgil, or from Dante and biblical texts, as well as shields and emblems of symbolic character. The arches transpired an architectural style reminiscent of mannerism, inspired by the work of Serlio and Vignola.
- Entrance of Mariana of Austria in Madrid (1649): it was planned by Alonso Cano, who built four triumphal arches dedicated to the four main continents and the four elements, in this relation: Europe-Air, Asia-Earth, Africa-Fire and America-Water. He also built a noble portal in the Buen Retiro, on pedestals of baroque stone, with six columns of Doric order and cornices decorated with castles and lions. Next to this portal, over the fountain of the Olive Tree of the Prado Viejo de San Jerónimo, a Parnassus Mount was erected with two summits, one presided by Hercules-Sun and the other by Pegasus, with Apollo in the center and nine statues dedicated to the muses and Spanish poets.
- Recognition of the Immaculate Conception in Valencia (1662): it was celebrated for half a year with masquerades and processions, and provisional altars were built all over the city, some with stagehouses that threw flakes of cotton simulating snow, in allusion to the purity of the Virgin. One of the most elaborate was located in the Faculty of Philosophy, covered with tapestries and silk and gold embroidery, crowned by an allegory of the Triumph of the Church, flanked by Pope Alexander VII and the Archbishop of Valencia, Martín López de Ontiveros.
- Celebration of the Immaculate Conception in Seville (1665): it was designed by Bartolomé Esteban Murillo, and celebrated in the church of Santa María la Blanca, on whose exterior two triumphal arches were placed, one dedicated to the Mystery of the Immaculate Conception and the other to the Triumph of the Eucharist, next to a bounded perimeter covered with awnings and occupied by altars decorated with Marian themes. A large painting of the Virgin by Juan Valdés Leal was placed at the door of the church.
- Canonization of Ferdinand III (1671): it was celebrated in Seville, city reconquered by the holy king, whose cathedral was adorned by several monuments and emblems made by Bernardo Simón de Pineda, in collaboration with the painter Juan Valdés Leal and the sculptor Pedro Roldán. The entire cathedral complex of Seville was decorated with painted canvases, including the Giralda and the Patio de los Naranjos; all the chapels were ornamented, and in the choir loft a triumphal arch was erected with the effigy of the honoree at the coronation, surrounded by allegorical figures; in addition, a stage set with a painting by Murillo was placed in the altarpiece of the tabernacle. This set of monuments exerted a notable influence on the architecture of the time, which lasted until the reign of Philip V, as an expression of a distinctly Spanish Baroque, with dynamic and profusely decorative forms. The designs for this event were printed in a "chronicle" written by Fernando de la Torre Farfán, considered the most beautiful book printed in Baroque Spain.
- Entrance of Marie Louise d'Orléans in Madrid (1680): Was organized by Claudio Coello and José Jiménez Donoso with the help of Matías de Torres and Francisco Solís among other painters, José Ratés and José Acedo in the architectural and Pedro Alonso de los Ríos, Enrique de Cardona and Mateo Rodríguez, in charge of the sculpture works, among many other artists. Five triumphal arches were erected, in Calle del Prado, Italianos, Puerta del Sol, Puerta de Guadalajara and Santa María, along with porticoes, fountains and decorative sculptures in the Retiro, San Felipe, Plaza de la Villa and Plaza de Palacio. All the elements were very ornately ornate, in an apotheosis of the most decorative Baroque, with an abundance of plant and stone motifs.
- Catafalque of Marie Louise d'Orléans in Madrid (1689): work of José Benito de Churriguera, its design served as a model for burial mounds until well into the 18th century. It was located in the church of the Real Monasterio de la Encarnación of Madrid, and consisted of a high platform with four flights of stairs, on which rose two bodies with a profuse decoration of moldings, foliage, tarjas and stipites, as well as various sculptures of allegorical figures and images of the deceased.
- Catafalque of Charles II in Barcelona (1700): the work of Josep Vives, it was a turriform tumulus with an octagonal base with shields supported by eagles and lions, on which rose a stepped pyramid ornamented with skulls and roleos, and topped by a hexagonal baldachin with the royal emblems. The iconographic program consisted of allegories of the Hispanic kingdoms (Castile, Aragon, Catalonia, Indias, Milan, Naples, Sicily, Flanders), the four continents (Europe, Americas, Africa, Asia), the four main rivers of the Iberian Peninsula (Ebro, Douro, Tagus, Guadalquivir), the theological virtues (Faith, Hope, Charity) and cardinal virtues (Prudence, Justice, Fortitude, Temperance), Victory and the Phoenix bird.
- Tomb of Louis XIV in Barcelona (1715): work of Josep Vives, it had a square plan with pedestals at the angles, crowned with statues, volutes, and fleurons, representing the Virtues with angels holding a portrait of the deceased, all crowned by a baldachin with the royal crown.
- Entry of Philip V in Seville (1729): celebrated the arrival of the monarch, who turned the Andalusian city into the seat of the court for five years. The city was adorned with hangings, paintings and tapestries, and various constructions such as pyramids and triumphal arches, as well as statues of mythological heroes, some pillars of Hercules with a lion spewing water from its mouth and a Colossus of Rhodes under which a ship was passing.
- Archiepiscopal appointment of Cardinal-Infante Luis de Borbón (1742): took place in Seville, where a masquerade and a procession of ornate carriages was organized, as well as fireworks, the illumination of the Giralda and the emergence of wine from the fountains of the episcopal palace for three days.
- Catafalque of Philip V in Madrid (1746): work of Juan Bautista Sacchetti, it featured a plinth with two staircases with balustrades representing the figures of Neptune and Cybele, above which rose a tempietto of aerial and diaphanous appearance, decorated with skeletons. Inspired by the work of the Italian family of scenographers Galli Bibbiena, his style is framed in a more classicist Baroque and international affiliation, away from the Hispanic Baroque inherited from the previous century.
- Philip V's tumulus in Cervera (1746): work of Pere Costa, it was erected in the chapel of the University of Cervera. It had an octagonal plinth, on whose sides were pyramids with allegories of Theology, Canon Law, Philosophy and Mathematics; on the cornice were represented Civil Law, Medicine, Poetry and Rhetoric; at the crowning there was a figure of Death treading crowns and scepters, and a shield with the inscription Philippi quod potui rapui, alluding to Death taking away his mortality, but not his immortal exploits.
- Proclamation of Ferdinand VI in Seville (1747): it was celebrated with a procession of eight decorated carriages, made of wood and covered with stucco, with brightly colored decoration. The first chariot was the Pregón de la Máscara, followed by the Pregón de la Común Alegría, four dedicated to the four elements, the Pregón de Apolo and the Pregón de los Reyes, which carried the portraits of the new monarchs.
- Arrival of Charles III to Barcelona (1759): for his arrival at the port a bridge, a staircase and a triumphal arch were built, decorated with figures from marine mythology and astrological allegories. Below were various arches with representations of the history of the city, alluding to its mythical foundation by Hercules. In the Lloja de Mar there was a large screen representing the Solar System, placing the king at the center of the universe. There was also a masquerade and a procession of five chariots that toured the city for three nights, decorated with a rococo aesthetic.
- Arrival of Charles III to Madrid (1759): several structures were built by the architect in fashion at the time, Ventura Rodríguez, with the collaboration of the sculptor Felipe de Castro; the inscriptions of the ornamental fabrics were written by Pedro Rodríguez de Campomanes and Vicente Antonio García de la Huerta. The streets of Madrid were ornamented with tapestries and hangings, in bright colors such as gold, pastel blue and lapis lazulis; in the Puerta del Sol a rotunda temple (tholos) was built, with imitations of jasper for the columns, bronze in bases and capitals and marble in cornices and pedestals; in Carretas Street a triumphal arch was erected, decorated with reliefs and trophies; another arch was placed in Mayor Street, with representations alluding to the king's piety and liberality, next to a double gallery of composite order that thanked the new monarch for the suspension of tax debts. All these ornaments were designed in a more sober style than usual, already pointing to the neoclassicism of the end of the century, although its conception was still basically baroque.
- Tumulus of Queen Maria Amalia of Saxony in Barcelona (1761): built in the cathedral, it was the work of Manuel and Francesc Tramulles. On the facade was placed a baroque portal with cartouches and mortuary symbols, as well as an allegory of Catalonia in mourning. Inside, the coats of arms of the kingdoms of the Hispanic Monarchy, Saxony and the four continents were placed. In the choir loft there was a portal with an allegory of Barcelona in the form of a weeping nymph. Finally, between the choir and the presbytery a mausoleum was installed, which presented a low body with allegories of Tarragona, Tortosa, Lleida, Girona, Vic, Manresa, Mataró and Cervera; in the intercolumniations there were sculptures of Pain, Love, Loyalty and Gratitude and, in the center, the royal coffin with scepter and crown; in the second body there were seated sculptures of Generosity, Constancy, Intelligence and Obedience; in the upper body, Charity, Religion, Humility, Prayer and, in the center, Barcelona; finally, in the crowning, Eternal Happiness.

== See also ==
- Alberto de Churriguera
- José del Olmo
- History of architecture
- Baroque architecture
- Ephemeral art
- History of aesthetics
- Spanish Baroque
- Spanish Baroque architecture
- Falla monuments are modern satirical sculptures burnt in the Fallas festival of Valencia, Spain.
- Game of Cañas
- Joaquín de Churriguera

== Bibliography ==
- Antonio Sáenz, Trinidad de (1989). El siglo XVII español. Madrid: Historia 16.
- Azcárate Ristori, José María de; Pérez Sánchez, Alfonso Emilio; Ramírez Domínguez, Juan Antonio (1983). Historia del Arte. Madrid: Anaya. ISBN 84-207-1408-9.
- Fernández Arenas, José (1988). Arte efímero y espacio estético. Barcelona: Anthropos. ISBN 84-7658-078-9.
- Giorgi, Rosa (2007). El siglo XVII. Barcelona: Electa. ISBN 978-84-8156-420-4.
- Hernández Díaz, José; Martín González, Juan José; Pita Andrade, José Manuel (1999). Summa Artis XXVI. Escultura y arquitectura españolas del siglo XVII. Madrid: Espasa-Calpe. ISBN 84-239-5226-6.
- Martínez Ripoll, Antonio (1989). El Barroco en Italia. Madrid: Historia 16.
- Soto Caba, Victoria (1992). El Barroco efímero. Madrid: Historia 16. ISBN 84-7679-199-2.
- Suárez Quevedo, Diego (1989). Renacimiento y Manierismo en Europa. Madrid: Historia 16.
- Toman, Rolf (2007). El Barroco. Colonia: Ullmann. ISBN 978-3-8331-4659-6.
- Triadó, Joan Ramon; Barral i Altet, Xavier (1999). Art de Catalunya 5: Arquitectura religiosa moderna i contemporània (in Catalan). Barcelona: Edicions L'isard. ISBN 84-89931-14-3.
