= Barocco (disambiguation) =

Barocco is a 1976 French film directed by André Téchiné.

Barocco may also refer to:

- Barocco (1925 film), French silent film
- Rocco Barocco (born 1944), Italian fashion designer
- Barocco, former name of the Red Dress (embroidery project)
- Barocco (album), an album by Rondo Veneziano

== See also ==
- Baroque (disambiguation)
