= José del Olmo =

Spanish Baroque architect (1638–1702)

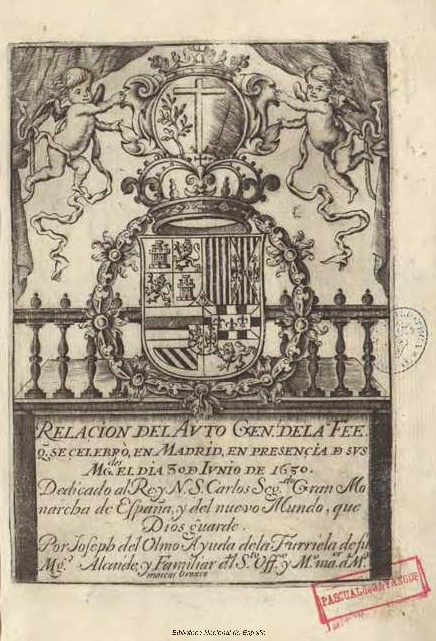
Marcos Orozco: frontispiece of the Relacion historica del auto general de fe que se celebro en Madrid Este Año de 1680... vá inserta la Estampa de toda la Perspectiva del Teatro, Plaça y Valcones por Ioseph del Olmo, Alcayde y Familiar del Santo Oficio, Ayuda de la Furriela de su Magestad, y Maestro mayor del Buen Retiro y villa de Madrid [...] por Roque Rico de Miranda, 1680. National Library of Spain.

José del Olmo (Pastrana, Guadalajara, 1638 – Madrid, 1702) was a Spanish architect. He was the younger brother of the architect Manuel del Olmo, with whom he had a close personal and professional collaboration. José's style is encompassed within the Baroque. His career was tied to the success and fall of Fernando de Valenzuela, minister of Charles II. He obtained the position of Aparejador de las obras reales (Foreman of Royal Works) first and Maestro de Obras Reales (Master of Royal Works) subsequently. From his position at the Court he received commissions from the aristocracy, such as the palaces of the Duke of Segorbe and the Duke of Infantado.

== Career ==
Under the guidance of his older brother, he learned the profession of architecture and was introduced to the Court with the support of the Duke of Pastrana. In 1667, having just obtained the having just passed the examination for master architect, one of the first architectural works in Madrid in which he participated was the design and execution, together with his brother, of the church of the Convent of the Comendadoras de Santiago, completed in 1675. It is one of the few Madrid churches conceived with a centralized plan; in this case, a large Greek cross with the ends finished in semicircular form, which provides great dynamism to the interior space.

He also worked to repair the damage caused by a fire in the Monastery of El Escorial; he created the funerary catafalque to honor the death of Empress Margaret Theresa of Spain and in recognition of the work performed, he was granted the title Maestro de Obras Reales (Master of Royal Works, a position that upon his death went to Teodoro Ardemans). He was commissioned with works of ephemeral architecture, such as directing the construction in Madrid's Plaza Mayor of the theater stands for the celebration of the auto-da-fé of the year 1680, about which he himself wrote and published that same year the brief Relación histórica del auto general de fe, que se celebró en Madrid Este Año de 1680, with a description of the works of the platform and the ceremony, and a print of the development of the auto, the work of Gregorio Fosman. This engraving was taken as a source three years later by Francisco Rizi for a large canvas (located at the Prado Museum) of the same subject.

One of his best-known works is the design and execution of the altarpiece of the Sacred Form of Gorkum, which presides over the main sacristy of the Escorial monastery and which is one of the masterpieces of Spanish Baroque, both for its scenographic effects (it is an altarpiece with movable elements, in the manner of a transparent or display case) and for its careful execution, with a large central painting by Claudio Coello.
