= Spanish Baroque =

Spanish Baroque may refer to:

- Spanish Baroque literature
- Spanish Baroque painting

== Architecture (mostly) ==
- Spanish Baroque architecture
- New Spanish Baroque, also known as Mexican Baroque, a 17th- to 18th-century style of art
- Andean Baroque
- Baroque Churches of the Philippines
- Spanish Baroque ephemeral architecture

== See also ==
- Baroque music
- Category:Spanish Baroque painters
- Spanish Golden Age
