= Guerrilla architecture =

Guerrilla architecture is the hacking of existing buildings, often old, disused or distressed, adapted to a new function. Guerrilla architecture is both a social and political movement. It challenges the established architectural hierarchy by creating interventions in a very non-conformist way. Students tired of waiting for sustainable transformation in the built environment and disillusioned with the pace of change in architectural sustainability challenge hijack disused spaces to create socially responsible and sustainable designs. Buildings, spaces, attachments and interventions are often characterised by their parasitic or alien nature.
