= Ciudad Abierta (Ritoque) =

Experimental architectural field and community in Ritoque, Chile

- Regions of Chile
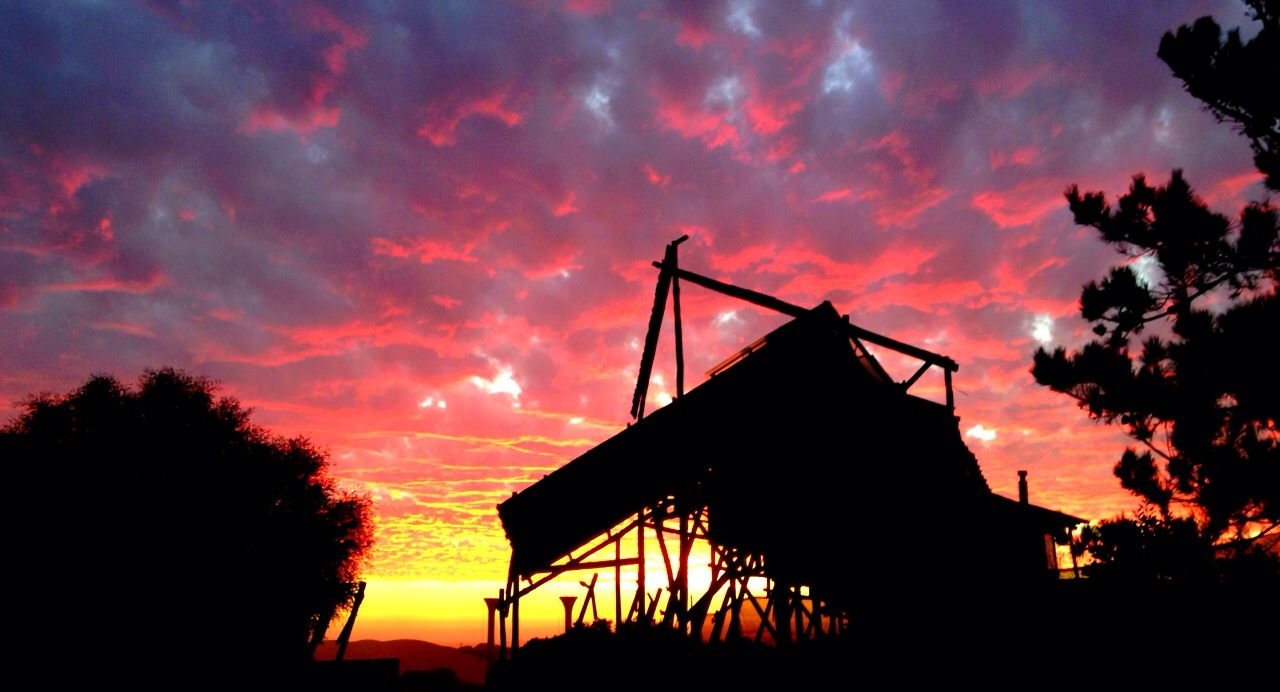
- Entrance Lodge
- Established: 1971
- Time zone: UTC-4
  - Summer (DST): -3

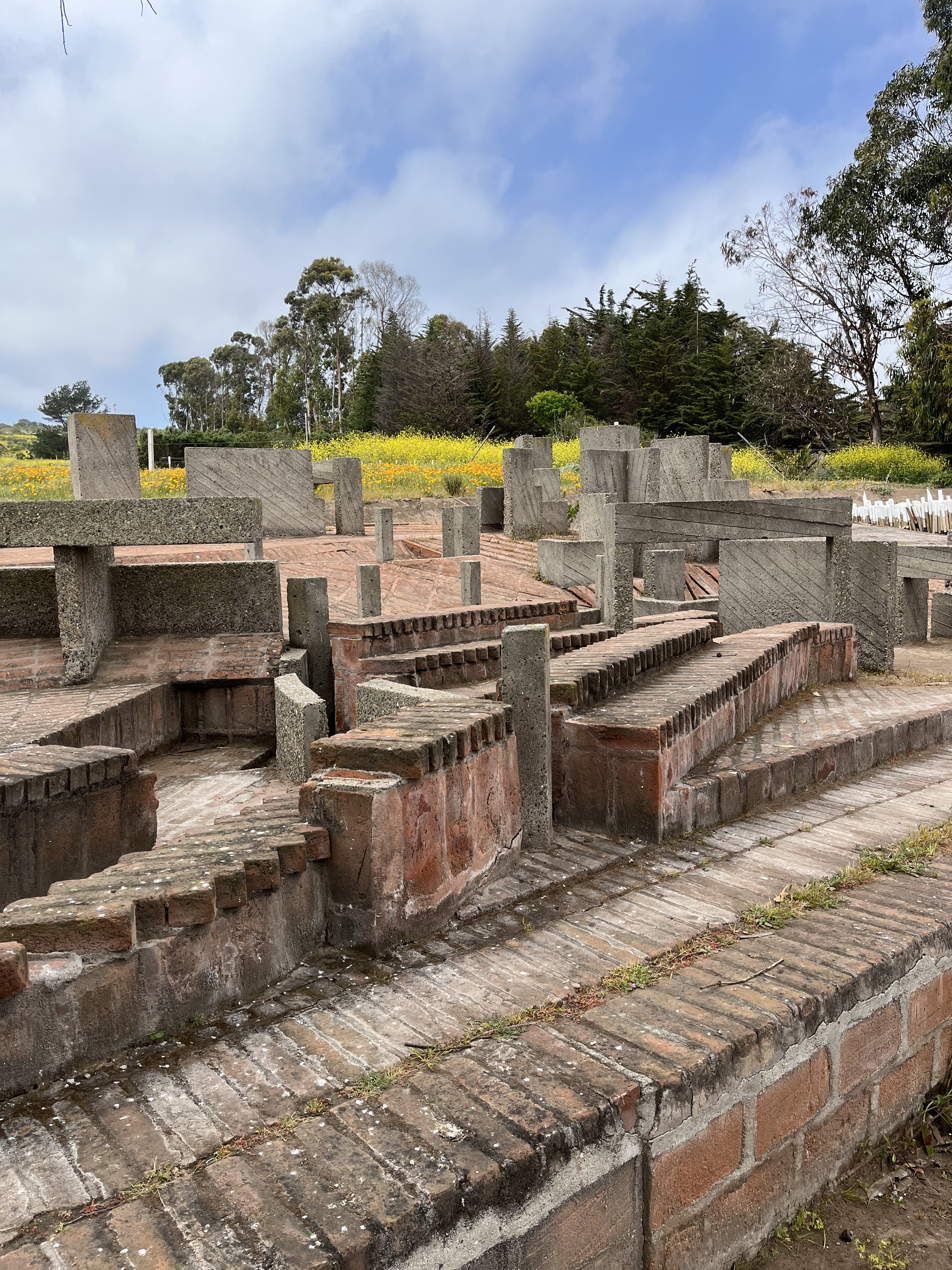
Brick constructions in the cemetery of Ciudad Abierta (Ritoque)

Ciudad Abierta (Open City) is a Chilean architectural experimentation field located in the Punta de Piedra area, in the locality of Ritoque, in the commune of Quintero, Valparaíso Region.

== History ==
In 1969, professors and students of the School of Architecture of the Pontifical Catholic University of Valparaíso formed the Amereida Cooperative. In 1971, the cooperative purchased an area of about 300 hectares, north of the Aconcagua River, consisting of a dune field, wetlands, ravines, farmland and three kilometres of adjoining beach, forming the land where Open City is now located. In this experimental field, various works of architecture and design have been built.

On the occasion of the exhibition La invención de un mar: Amereida 1965–2017 at the National Museum of Fine Arts in Santiago, architect Victoria Jolly and filmmaker Javier Correa, curators of the exhibition, explained the idea behind Amereida:

Although Amereida is not a political project, poetically it is highly revolutionary."

The Chilean poet Manuel Sanfuentes, a member of the community, describes the landscape and the way of intervening in it as follows:

"Half of Open City is dunes. It is a very abstract landscape. And the dune has the virtue that your footprints are erased. You come back the next day and the dune is intact. They named this ‘returning to not knowing’. The way of undertaking the works of Open City always involves returning to not knowing."

== Related publications ==
In October 1996, MIT Press published Ann M. Pendleton-Jullian’s book Road that Is Not a Road and the Open City, Ritoque, Chile, which also deals with Open City and includes more than 100 photographs of it.

Subsequently, in 2000 the publisher Editrice Dedalo Roma released Massimo Alfieri’s book La ciudad abierta. Una comunità di architetti, una architettura fatta in comune, which addresses Open City and the community of architects behind it.

In 2003, Chilean architects and academics Rodrigo Pérez de Arce and Fernando Pérez Oyarzún published Escuela de Valparaíso – Ciudad Abierta, a book issued by the publishers TANAIS (Spain), McGill–Queen’s (Canada) and Birkhäuser (Germany).

== Works ==
=== Outdoor works in Open City ===
- 1972 Ágora de Tronquoy (destroyed)
- 1972 Music room
- 1976 Cemetery
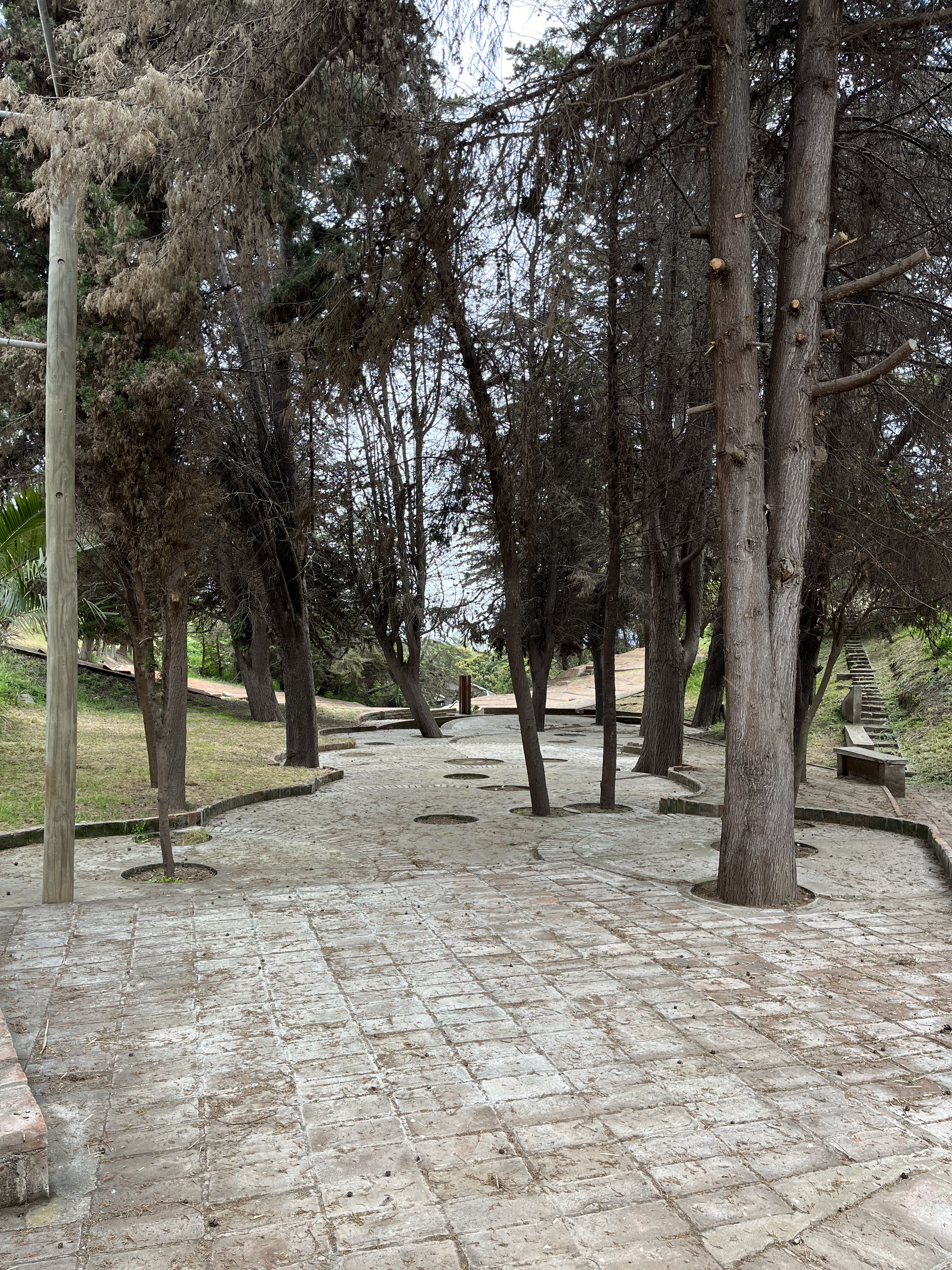
- Interiors of the cemetery of Ciudad Abierta in Ritoque
  1976 Well
- 1978 Ágora de los Huéspedes
- 1980 and 1992 (reconstruction) Torres del Agua (destroyed in 2010)
- 1982 Palacio del Alba y el Ocaso
- 1982 Jardín Cenotafio de Bo
- 1983 Faubourg
- 1996 Mesa del Entreacto
- 1999 Chapel
- 2001 Open-air amphitheatre

=== Indoor works in Open City ===
- 1981–2000 Hospedería del Errante
- 1985 Hospedería de la Entrada

== See also ==
- Valparaíso School
