= Neo-Baroque =

Neo-Baroque may refer to:

- Neo-Baroque music
- Neo-Baroque painting, a painting style used by Christo Coetzee and others
- Baroque Revival architecture
- Neo-Baroque film
- the Organ reform movement
