= Sebastián Herrera Barnuevo =

Spanish painter (1611/19–1671)

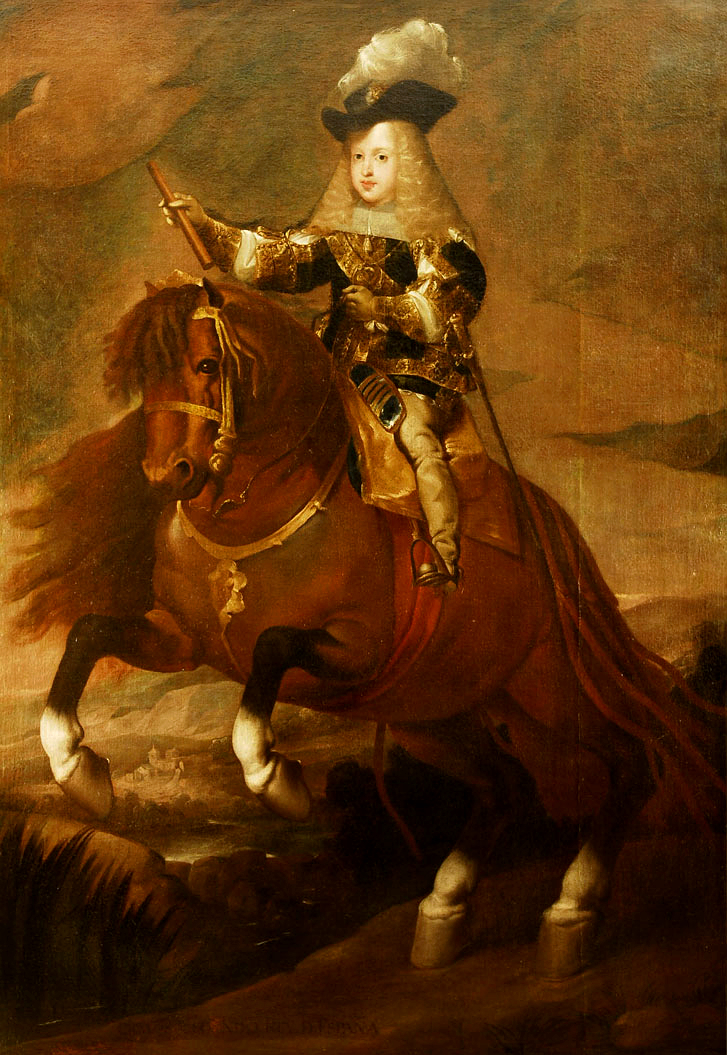
Portrait of King Charles II, by Herrera Barnuevo, c. 1670

Sebastián Herrera Barnuevo (1611 or 1619–1671) was a painter, architect, sculptor and etcher, who was born and died in Madrid, Spain.

== Life ==
His father, Antonio Herrera, was a sculptor; after being taught by his father, Sebastiano was taught by Alonso Cano. Like Cano, Herrera worked for king Philip IV of Spain, among others in the nobility. He was held to be modest and deeply religious.

== Works ==
His painting colors were brilliant and harmonized in the manner of Titian, however his style was so close to Guido as to be sometimes indistinguishable. (St. Barnabas was long believed to be by Guido.)

At the end of the 19th century, most of his paintings were in Madrid. His best are considered the "St. Barnabas" in El Escorial, the Beatification of St. Augustine in the Chapel of the Augustinian Recollects and the Nativity in the San Jerónimo el Real. Another of his paintings is Retrato de Carlos II niño con su madre la Reina Mariana de Austria (Portrait of King Carlos II as a child, with his mother Queen Mariana of Austria).

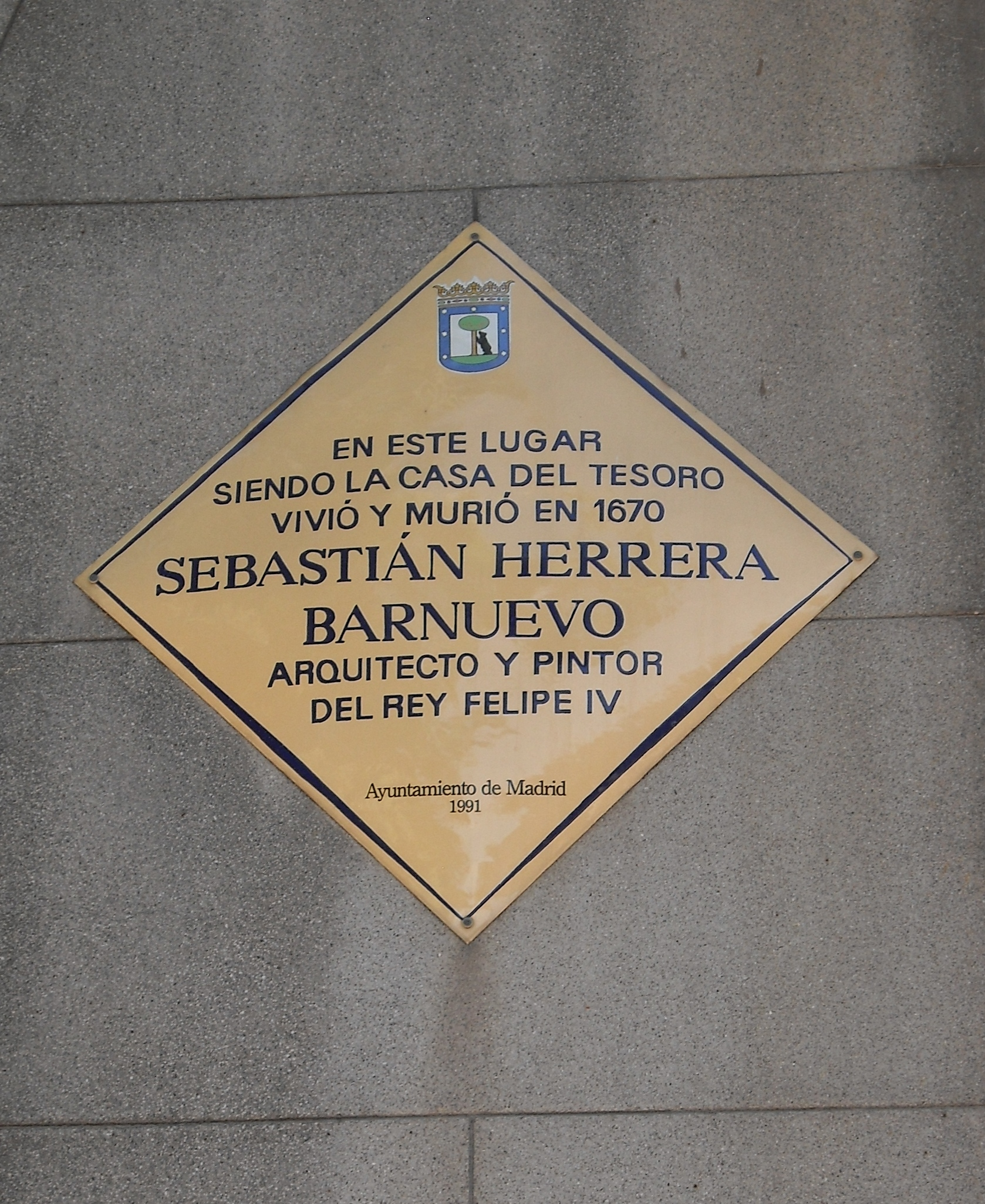
Memorial plaque at Plaza de Oriente, 3 in Madrid

In 1991 a memorial plaque for Herrera was installed at Plaza de Oriente, 3 in Madrid.
