= José Camarón Bonanat =

Spanish painter (1731–1803)

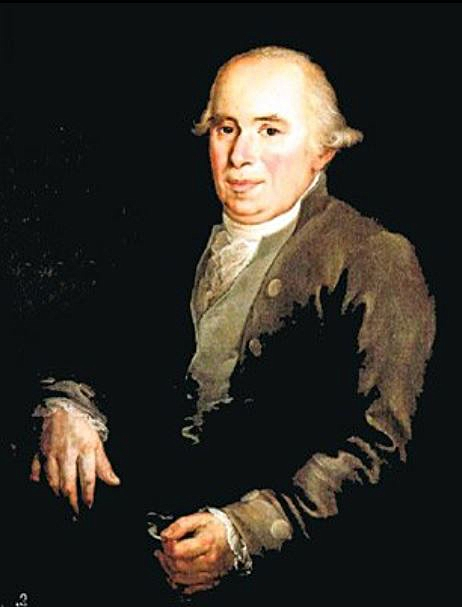
José Camarón Bonanat (Self-portrait?)

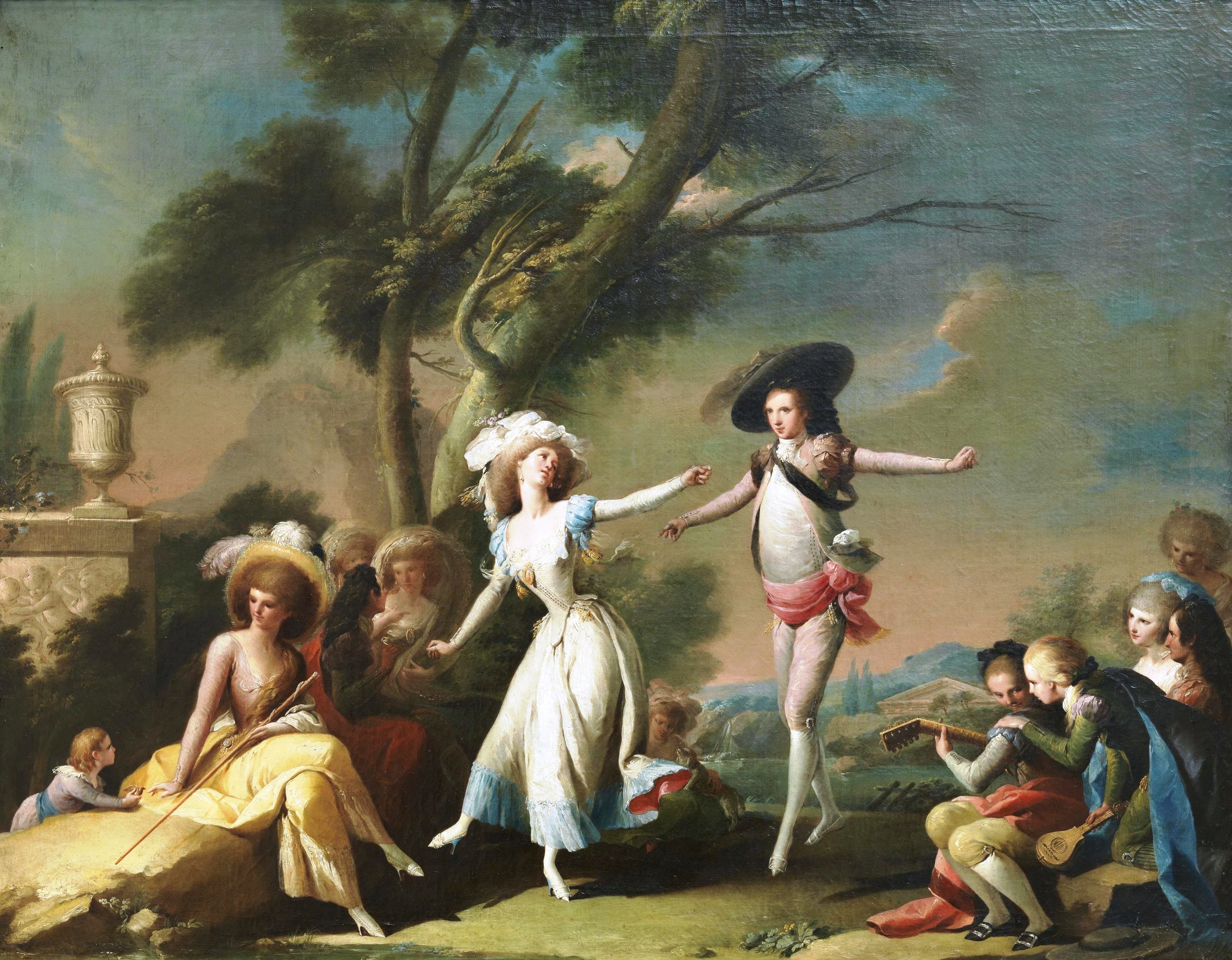
El Bolero (1785), Museo del Prado

José Camarón Bonanat, or Bononat (18 May 1731, Segorbe - 14 July 1803, Valencia) was a Spanish draftsman, painter and engraver. Most early sources give his maternal family name as Boronat.

== Life and works ==
His father, Nicolás Camarón, was a sculptor and gave him his first art lessons. Later, in Valencia, he continued his studies with his uncle, Mosén Eliseo Bonanat (1697-1761), who created portrait miniatures, and with the painter, Miguel Posadas, who was also a Dominican friar. In 1752, he relocated to Madrid to complete his studies. Initially, he devoted himself to miniatures, landscapes, and copies of the Baroque masters, such as Titian, Rubens and Murillo.

In 1754, he returned to Valencia, where he participated in an exhibition at the newly created Academia de Bellas Artes de Santa Bárbara, and was named a Professor there. He maintained his contacts with Madrid, however, and was accepted as an honorary member of the Real Academia de Bellas Artes de San Fernando in 1762. Shortly after, he was among the founders of the Real Academia de Bellas Artes de San Carlos de Valencia where, upon the death of Cristóbal Valero, he became the Director of Painting. From 1796 to 1801, he served as General Director. He resigned, following several trips to Madrid to treat his eyes for an unspecified ailment.

He was a friend of the jurist and writer, Francisco Pérez Bayer, who commissioned him to decorate the church of Saint Thomas of Villanova, which was under construction in Benicàssim; a project that occupied him from the late 1760s until 1776. He also participated in creating a major cycle of paintings at the Basilica of San Francisco el Grande, Madrid.

Also notable are the altarpieces at Valencia Cathedral and the frescoes he began at Segorbe Cathedral in 1800. They were unfinished when he died, and were completed by his son, Manuel, in 1806. Despite his focus on religious works, his genre scenes, in Rococo style, are his best known, as well as the illustrations he designed for a 1777 edition of Don Quixote.

He was married to Juliana Meliá in 1758, and they had five children. In addition to Manuel, his eldest son, José Camarón y Meliá, also became a painter.

== Sources ==
- Biography in the Enciclopedia en línea @ the Museo del Prado
- Biography @ the Real Academia de la Historia
- Scholarly articles about José Camarón Bonanat both in web and PDF @ the Spanish Old Masters Gallery
