= Benito Espinós =

Spanish painter (1748–1818)

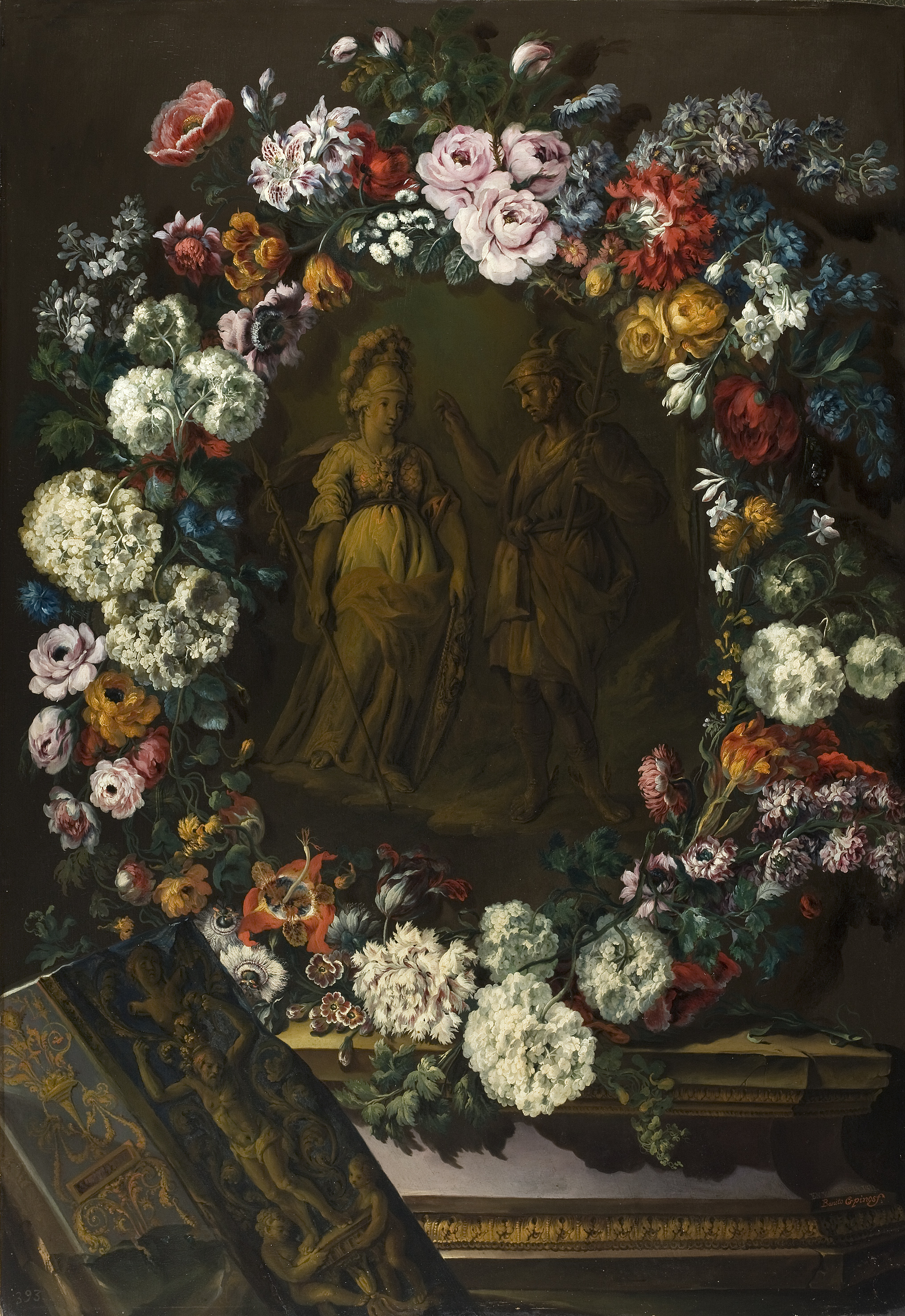
Floral Wreath with Minerva and Mercury

Benito Espinós (1748, Valencia - March 23, 1818, Valencia) was a Spanish painter who specialized in floral still-lifes and ornamentation.

== Biography ==
His father, José Espinós (1721-1784), was a painter and engraver who had trained with the Baroque master, Evaristo Muñoz. He began his career working in his father's studio, painting decorative designs for the textile manufactory that had been established in Valencia by the Cinco Gremios Mayores (Five Guilds) of Madrid. In 1784, he was named Director of the School of Flowers and Ornamentation at the Real Academia de Bellas Artes de San Carlos, whose primary function was providing design for the silk industry. Through the mediation of the Conde de Floridablanca, he also received commissions from the Royal Court. In 1788 he travelled to Madrid, with the object of presenting five of his paintings to the soon-to-be King Carlos IV

In 1815, after suffering a stroke that caused him to lose his sight in one eye, he resigned from his position at the Academia. During his years there, he taught and influenced several artists who would become notable floral painters, including Miguel Parra Abril and José Romá.

In his output, one may distinguish two clear phases; the first which featured elaborate garlands, backed by architectural scenes or figures, and the second, consisting largely of natural floral arrangements with vases and other simple props. All of his work maintains a strict Classical style. Many of his works may be seen at the Reial Acadèmia Catalana de Belles Arts de Sant Jordi.
