= Palace of the Marqués de Dos Aguas =

Coordinates: 39°28′23.95″N 0°22′27.85″W

Palacio del Marqués de Dos Aguas
- Palacio del Marqués de Dos Aguas (Spanish); Palau del Marqués de Dosaigües (Valencian)
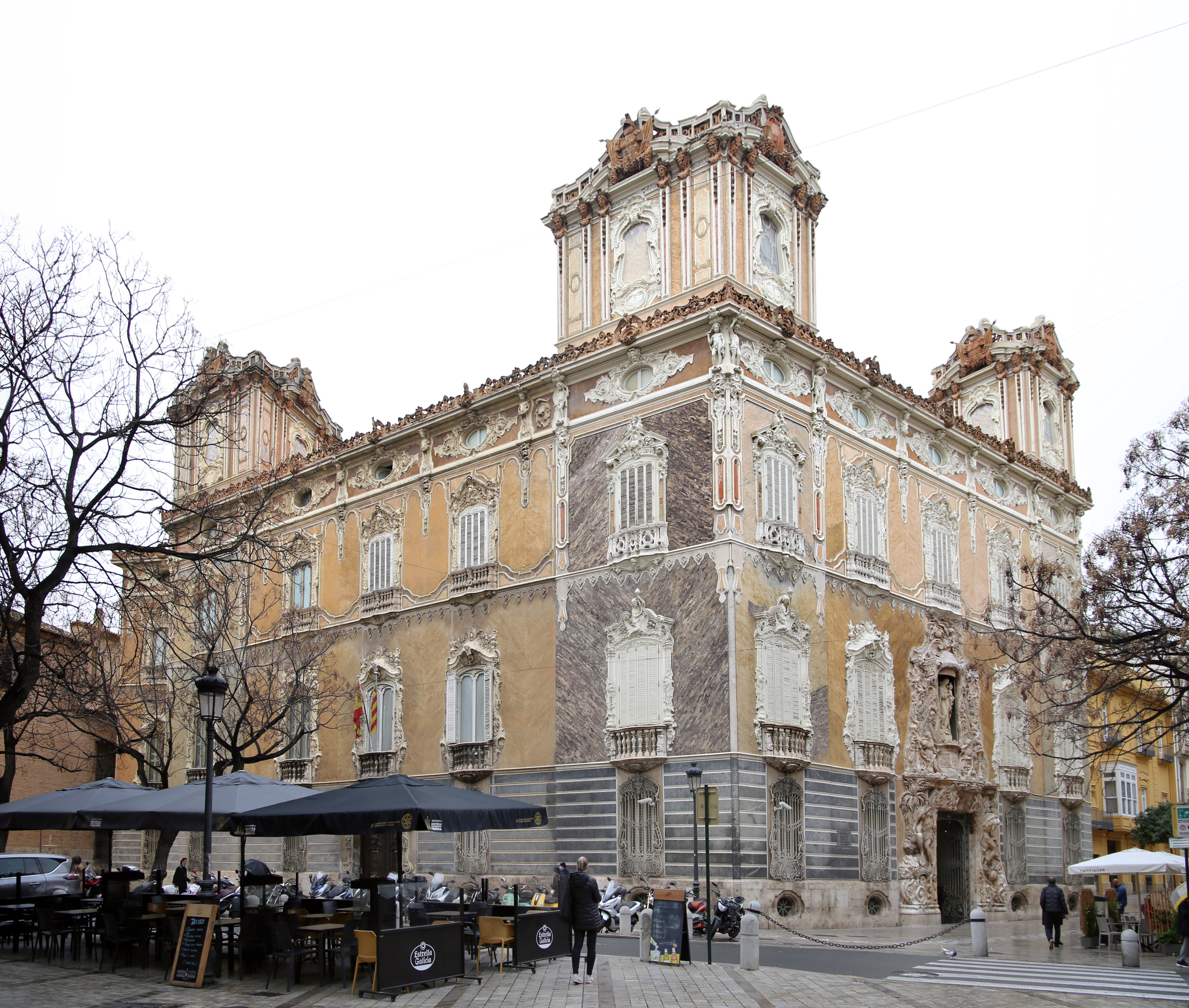

- Location within Spain
- Location: Valencia, Spain

Spanish Cultural Heritage
- Official name: Palau del Marqués de Dosaigües
- Type: Non-movable
- Reference no.: RI-51-0001213

The Palace of the Marquis of Dos Aguas (Spanish: Palacio del Marqués de Dos Aguas, Valencian: Palau del Marqués de Dosaigües) is a Rococo nobility palace, historically important in the city. It is located in one of the most central locations in the city of Valencia (Spain). It is a stately mansion that was the property of the Marqueses of Dos Aguas and is currently owned by the Spanish State. It houses the González Martí National Museum of Ceramics and Decorative Arts.

A noble knight, Don Francisco Perellós, a descendant of the counts of Tolosa, married in the early 15th century to Joanna Perellós, the only daughter of the wealthy Mosen Gines de Rabassa. The descendants of this marriage took the surname of Rabassa de Perellós. This family acquired by purchase the barony of Dosaigües in 1496, being elevated to marquisate by King Charles II of Spain in 1699.

Historians say, that the house of the Marqueses of Dos Aguas was considered in Valencia for centuries, as a paragon of nobility and opulence and that its fortune came from the year 1500, at which time a family of merchants, the Rabassa, was enriched, first with the commercial treatment and then with the leases of the rights of the Generalitat Valenciana, i.e. the contracts of indirect contributions. The Rabassa de Perellós family continued their business with the Generalitat, while occupying high positions in the political government of Valencia and accumulated skills and important heredities through intermarriage with other important Valencian noble families.

The space in which it is located is believed that was probably originally the field intended to a Roman necropolis of the 1st and 3rd centuries, due to the findings in one of its courtyards on September 9, 1743.

== Building in the 15th century ==
The building, originally long noted for the rich Gothic exterior facades and splendid Gothic interiors added in 15th century, was constructed by the Rabassa Perellós family. In its origin and at the view the Plan of Father Tosca, the palace was a Gothic building by the year 1400, of three bodies willing around a courtyard, facade at north, embattled tower at northeast (left of the front), midpoint portal, loggia run under the eaves and tiled roof. Today and after numerous renovations, the palace has an irregular plan, organized around two courtyards and with three towers on three of its corners. Its elevation is developed on ground floor, main floor and second floor.

== Building in the 18th century ==
In the 18th century, the manor of the Rabassa de Perellós underwent a radical renovation carried out in 1740 by the 3rd Marquis of Dos Aguas, Ginés Rabassa de Perellós y Lanuza (1706–1765) as a sign of his power and lineage. The three main architects of the renovations were Hipólito Rovira Meri (painter), Ignacio Vergara (sculptor) and Luis Domingo (1718–1767) (decorator).

Hipólito Rovira was responsible for decorating the mansion. The facades were frescoed by Rovira with allegorical themes and blue hues, but soon disappeared, being repainted in 1770 by José Ferrer, alias Ferreret (1728–1782), although this decoration eventually also disappeared.

=== Current appearance, of 18th century ===
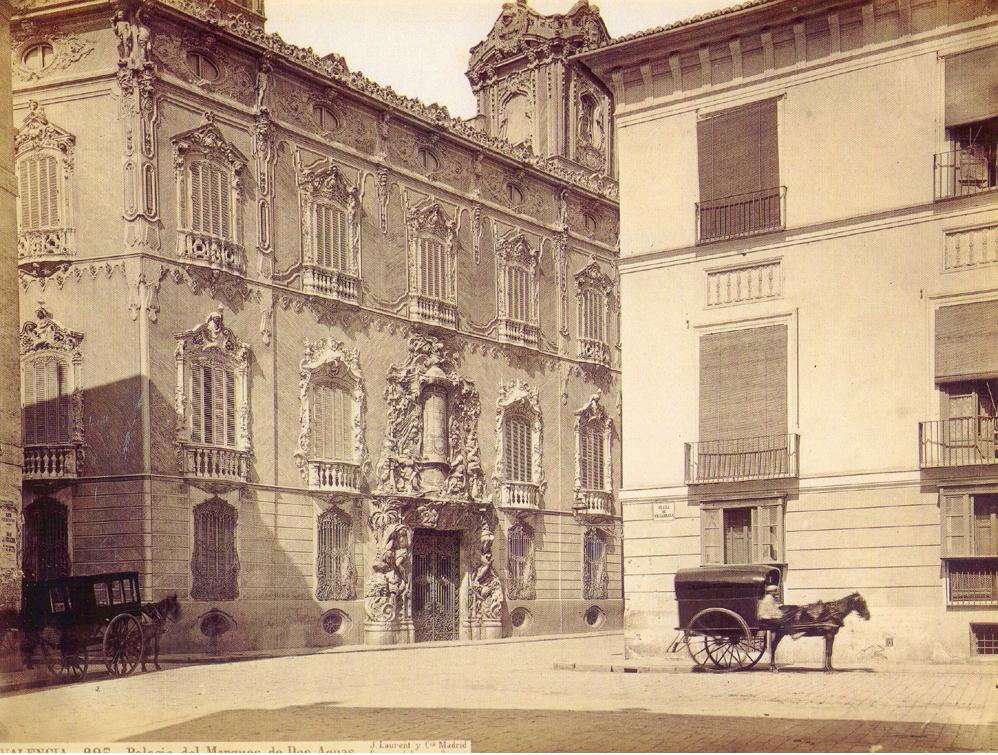
Palacio del Marqués de Dos Agüas, c. 1870, photographed by J. Laurent.

On the entrance and protecting it built a corrido balcony with undulating parapets supported on braces. During these renovations, a second tower was also built on the northwest side (to the right of the main entrance).

Inside were placed pavements of polychrome azulejos with mythological scenes, and the stairs were decorated with vegetable-themed risers and the walls were covered with elegant fabrics, stuccos and frescoes in walls and ceilings.

==== Entrance ====
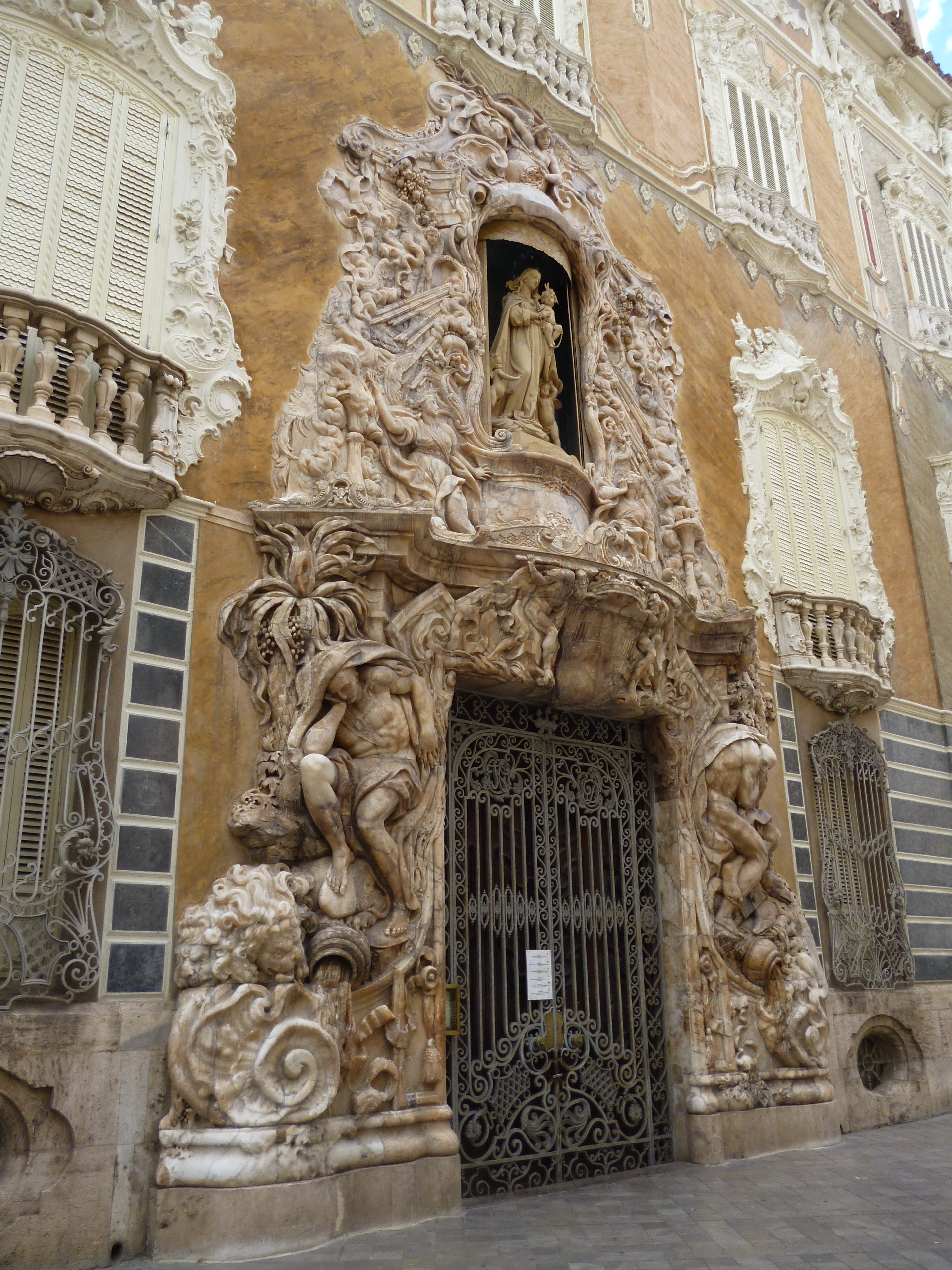
Palacio del Marques de Dos Aguas, Entrance

This renovation changed its previous Gothic structure entirely; it stands out above all its main entrance gives onto the street of the Marqués de Dos Aguas. It is made of alabaster by the Valencian, Ignacio Vergara Gimeno, founder and professor of the Royal Academy of Fine Arts of San Carlos, on the design of Hipólito Rovira, protected of the Marquis. (Ypolitus Rovira Ynventor et Ygnatius Vergara fabricator).

In the composition of this magnificent entrance made in 1745 reference to the two largest rivers of the Valencian community is: the Turia and Júcar, represented by two naked human figures (Atlanteans); under these two buckets pour water in clear reference to the title of the Marquises.

On the right side of the entrance it see represented two heads of crocodile, a quiver of arrows and a vessel by whose mouth pour the water. On this set one of the two great figures referred to above and higher up decoration of ivy whose trunk it curls a snake.

On the left side, a reclining lion, another vessel pouring water into and other quiver of arrows. On the back of the lion resting the foot on the other giant. Complete the set diverse decoration of plant type and a palm tree.

In the doorpost the complex shield of the Marquises, the shield of the Rabassa de Perellós family and its various noble junctions. Embrace or rather protect the shield, the figures of two savages with maces. So between its quarters it can find the surnames Perellós (represented by some pears), Rabassa, the lineage of the Lanuza, Rocafull, Boil, Hijar and Maza de Lizana among others.

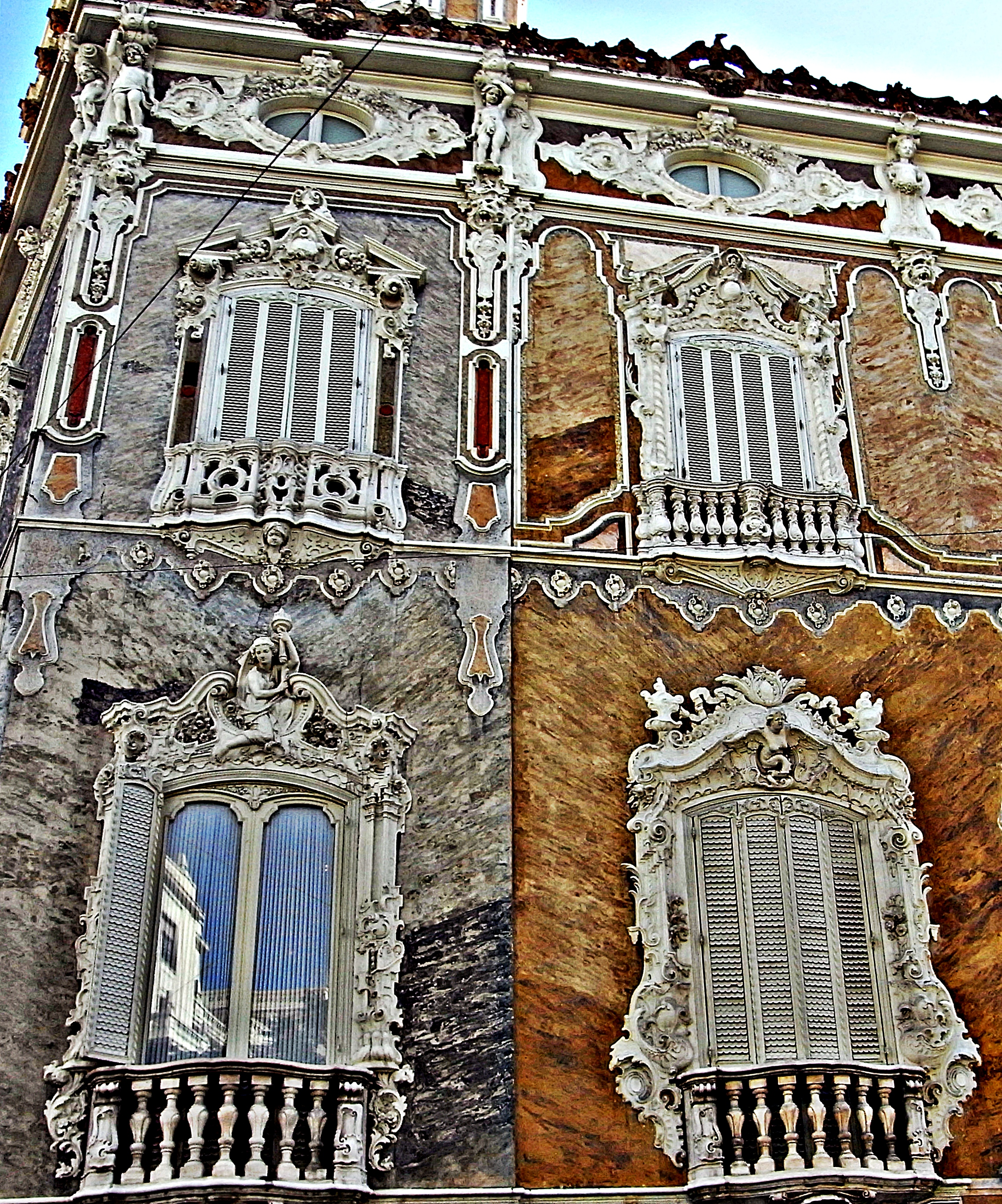
Detail of Rococo windows

In the upper body of the entrance, in a niche artistic, the image to natural size of the Virgin of the Rosary, chosen as special patron saint by the House of Dos Aguas. At the foot of the Virgin two matrons kneeling, one with a cornucopia (the horn of Almatea) from which it spilling fruits (allegory of Agriculture and Prosperity) and the other with a vessel at its feet from out coins (allegory of Justice and Magnanimity). Flank the Virgin of the Rosary two pairs of small winged sirens. Throughout the entrance the overflowing voluptuousness of the Rococo style. Above the niche where the Virgin, it see represented the image of an angel with a trumpet, is "la Fama" trumpeter that proclaims the greatness of the Marquisate of Dos Aguas also wears a laurel wreath. The Virgin of the Rosary is work in polychrome wood by Ignacio Vergara in 1740 but it disappeared, it now see is a plaster copy made in 1866 by Francisco Cano Molineli. The niche has a lid that allows the concealment of the image; when the Marquises were outside the palace the image of the Virgin was hidden, and if they were inside the palace the image appeared in full view to the people.

==== Entrance of the carriages ====
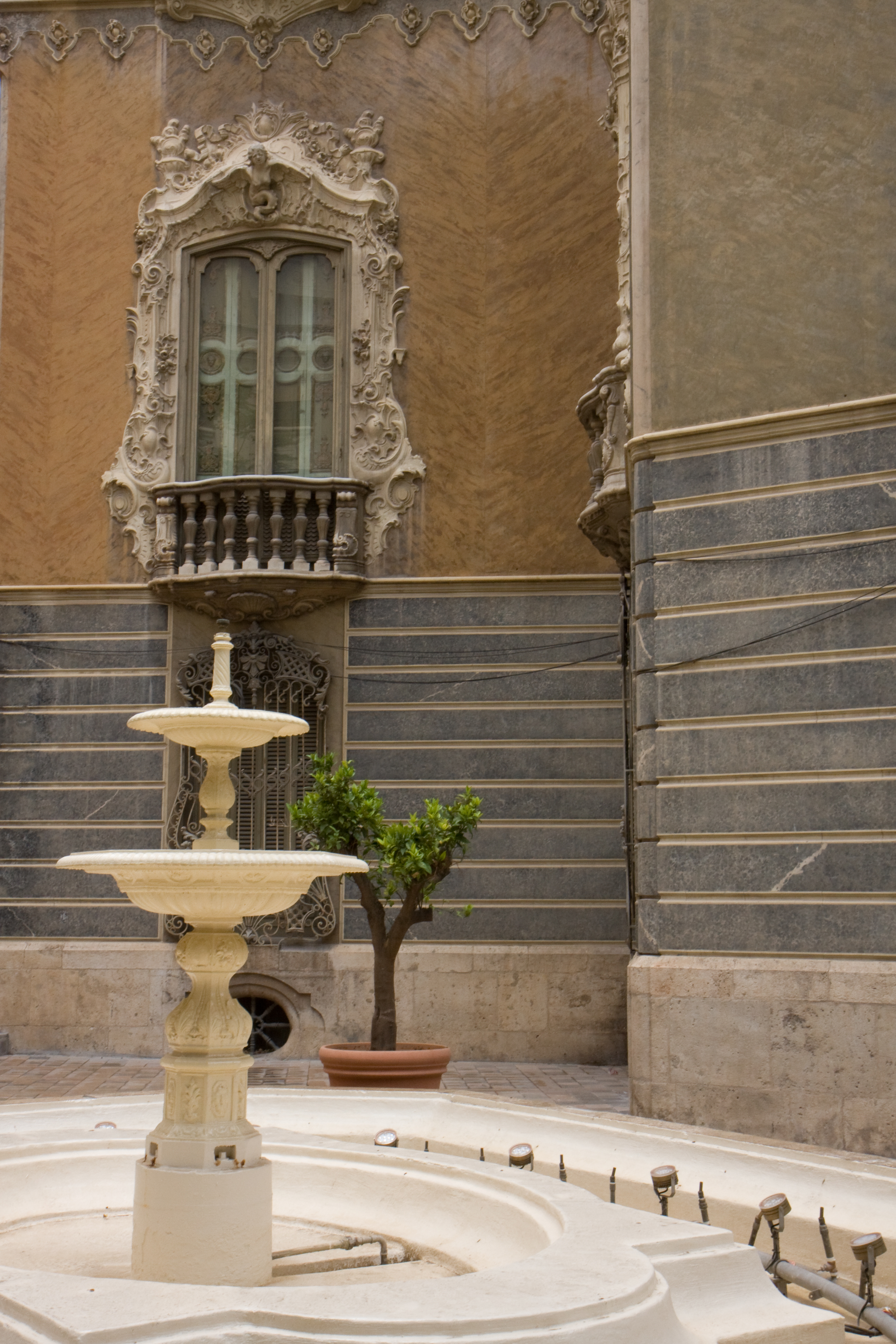
Fountain near the entrance of the carriages.

On the facade facing the street of Poeta Querol, it find a second entrance much simpler than the main, is known as Entrance of the carriages, and already its name tells us what it was for. The door dated between 1864 and 1867 has oak woodwork, while the panels that decorate it are of walnut. The decor is based on rockeries and fruits, highlighting the central panels two masks of the Greek god Pan (in Roman mythology: Faun). In addition it stand out among the rockery ornaments two sets of metal letters with the initials MD (Marqués de Dos Aguas).

In the small square that forms this space there a romantic fountain.

==== Sections of the facade ====
The frescoes in the vault form a set of characters and gods of classical mythology: Minerva, Ceres, Jupiter, Mercury etc. The vault rests on four pechinas in stucco subject by Atlanteans and decorated by Luis Domingo with the four parts of the known world represented by its allegorical animals: America with a caiman, Africa with a lion, Asia with an elephant and Europe with a horse.

Ramón Ximénez Cros (1862–1867) balustered the balconies, decorated with rockeries the jambs and lintels of doors and windows. Add figures of cherubs, cornucopias, masks, pilasters, classical busts and pediments both inside and outside. Add in the pediments nude female characters sometimes in the form of fantastic figures. The towers are decorated with shields, crests, breastplates and covers. The decoration of balconies and windows is made in stucco, plaster or terracotta and the facades are painted with marbled stucco simulating marble in gray and pink. The crests are decorated with terracotta eagles and scrolls, while the towers made with panoply of weapons also in terracotta. This decoration is performed by José Nicoli and Cayetano Francini. Is demolished the balcony made in the 18th century on the main entrance. Among the fantastic figures found in the facade, include the sirens, half women half fish that endowed with wings by the gods, looking for air and sea and its partner Persephone abducted by Hades. Another recognizable figure is Aurora, female figure that every morning at getting up light a torch to dissolve the darkness and make way for the sun that lights the day.

==== Inner courtyard ====
In the inner courtyard (Patio de la fuente) were replaced the Gothic windows for Rococo balconies with allegorical figures in clay (terracotta) alluding to the interests and tastes of the Marquis. These figures are sometimes represented as gods and goddesses of Greek and Roman pantheon.

In the center of the courtyard it was placed a small marble fountain whose central motif is a child who rides a swan. This same motif it can find in the Jardines de Monforte.

Between 1991 and 1998 was placed a glass skylight to protect the courtyard from the weather.

==== Levels ====
At a lower level it see allegories of the Fine Arts as female characters and related elements to the same: thus it see displayed the architecture (holding a plan of the palace), the sculpture (with a bust in its hands). At this level it see other allegories such as the agriculture represented by a woman who is on her lap and her feet the fruits of the land and the labor represented by a spinner. On the entrance door to inner of the palace, two figures of goddesses of Olympus, left the goddess Demeter-Ceres with the horn of Almatea, alluding to the abundance; and right the goddess Athena-Minerva as deity of wisdom with shield, helmet and spear (the spear now defunct).

On the upper level and decorating the balconies continue the allegories: the Sciences and the Letters with representations of books and astrolabes personified in the goddess Athena-Minerva, as goddess of wisdom; the war is represented in the person of the goddess Athena-Minerva (again) as goddess of war; the trade represented by the god Mercury-Hermes with caduceus and winged hat; the goddess Artemis-Diana goddess of hunting represented with various elements of hunting with a deer, the god Poseidon-Neptune with his trident and various utensils and marine animals as representing the maritime interests and finally the god Apollo-Phoebus with a lyre in his hands, god of the arts represented with various elements relating to this discipline.

On a third level and the top of the balconies of the second floor six medallions with busts of various gods: Apollo, Athena, Dionysus, Flora, Demeter and Helios.

All this iconographic program is a true reflection of the tastes, interests, desires and base of the fortune of the marquis.

==== Palace Interior ====
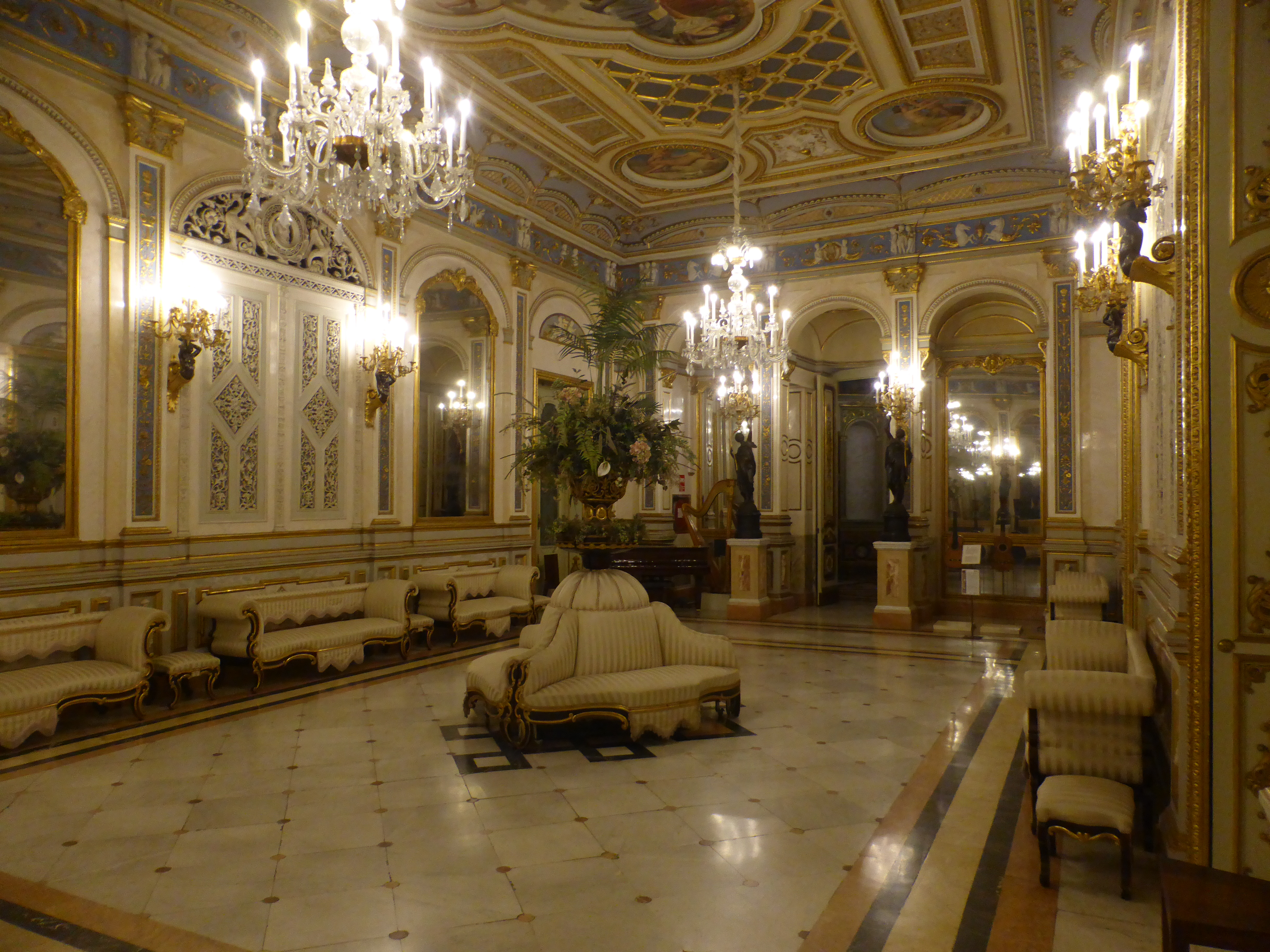
Ballroom.

The interior of the palace was also decorated with beautiful paintings and artistic marble on floors and halls, which were famous dances with the performance of singers and musicians who moved to Valencia, specially invited by the Marquis of Dos Aguas.

The interior is painted and decorated by good artists of the early-19th century: the roofs of the Chinesca hall were painted by José Flores Vela, the ceilings of the Pompeian hall by José Marcelo Contreras and Vicente Aznar Porcar. The dining by Rafael Montesinos y Ramiro, the ballroom by Salustiano Asenjo Arozamena, the bedroom of the marquis by Plácido Francés y Pascual and the toilets and the red hall by José Brel Giralt.

The walls of the walls are stuccoed with alabaster of the mines of Niñerola -where also were extracted the alabaster marble blocks that Vergara used to build the entrance of the palace-, near the village of Dos Aguas and that names the marquisate.

The access to the interior of the palace is via the main entrance. Crossed the hall, it enter the courtyard described above. From here a door flanked by two sculptures in the round of Carrara de Saint Agnes with a lamb in her arms and the goddess Ceres. Next to St. Agnes a bronze bust of the creator and founder of the museum Don Manuel Gonzalez Martí. On the lintel two reliefs with allegories of silk and agriculture.

Climbing the stairs access to the first floor and the first room we found is the:

==== Lobby ====
Chaired by a niche with a sculpture of the goddess Flora in Carrara marble. On the threshold of access to the lobby it found the shield of the marquisate flanked by two atlases with maces representing Iberia and Spain. From the lobby it can access the garden terrace or the Hall of illustrious people.

==== Garden terrace ====
This space is made in the 20th century to adapt the palace to its function as a museum. It actually found in one of the inner courtyards, which was covered by a floor up to the first floor and has qualified as a terrace. It contains a mixture of ceramic panels of the 18th century, garden furniture with mosaics made around 1900 and other decorative elements. To give light to the lower area of the courtyard has opened a skylight that takes some stepped pyramidal shape.

==== Hall of illustrious figures ====
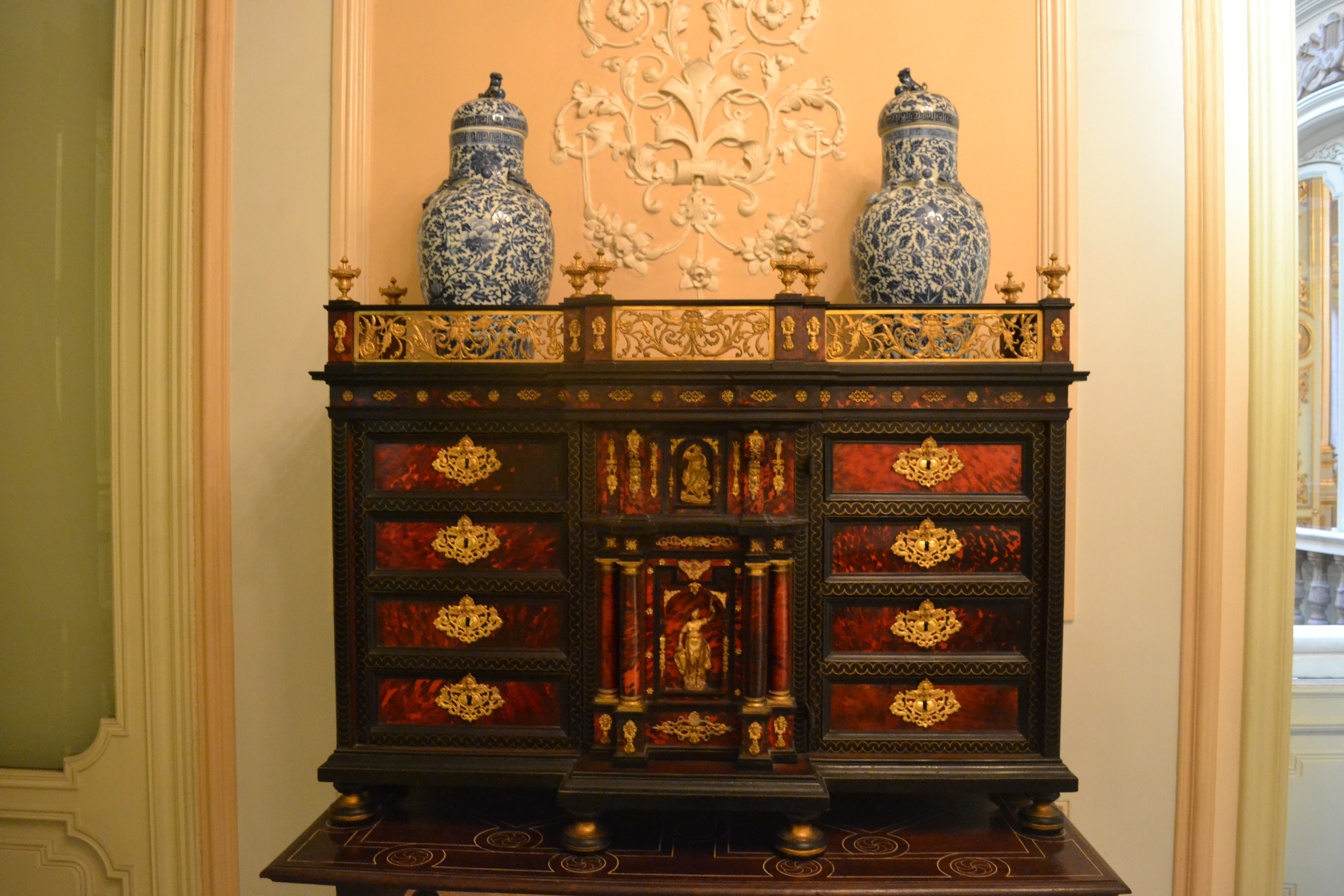
Ebony rosewood and cabinet, iron, brass, tortoiseshell and brass. (c. 19th century).

Irregular floor room decorated made with plaster by the carver Federico Blasco González. Called Hall of illustrious figures because in it is can see a series of five imaginary portraits of Valencian illustrious people made in oil on canvas by Jose Brel Giralt (Valencia 1841-Valencia 1894). They are: Joan de Joanes, Juan Luis Vives, Ausias March, Ignacio Vergara and Guillén de Castro. In the upper part a decorative frieze with representations of musicians children and bunches of grapes. Originally it was the prelude to the ballroom and is date around 1863.

==== Hall of the Luminary ====
Small room equipped with four cupboards hidden in the wall that was used to store equipment. It provides for the cupboards of large mirrors that ennoble its use. So named because originally provided a skylight illuminating the room, skylight that in the recent renovation has been deleted. Complete the decor of the room some cabinets with dining utensils put with decorative nature.

==== Far Eastern hall or tearoom ====
Is named by the type of decoration that looks on its walls, a type of oriental decoration very popular at the time. The decor is work by José Flores Vela (Valencia 1816–1880) and his brother Vicente Pérez Vela (brother only of mother). At the corners of the room some small temples of Mongol influence intended to be decorated with Japanese vases and porcelains. The oriental furniture is original of the time, is painted in black and is the work of Federico Noguera Picó.

==== Dining room ====
In which stands rectangular in the center of the roof, an oil on canvas in oval shaped with a representation of "The light fecundating to the Creation" by Valencian Rafael Montesinos Ramiro dated in 1862.

On the canvas it can see allegories of the four parts of the known world, represented by female characters with allusive animals: Africa with a lion, America with a parrot, Europe with a horse and Asia with an elephant.

The decor of the room in plaster is based on hunting, food, fishing, gathering and farm motifs. Highlights in this sumptuous decor, the four female busts (allegories of the four seasons), made of stucco by José Nicoli and which are situated in the spandrels of the walls.

==== Smoking Hall ====
Room intended for leisure and relaxation, where they smoked and drank coffee on the desk. The roof has a series of paintings by Julio Cebrián Mezquita made in 1890 with representations of cherubs among floral ornaments. In the corners four small roundels with floral representations of the same author. The furniture in the room is lush. On the wall there a Flemish tapestry of 17th century.

==== Oratory ====
Hall composed of two sections with a paint in oval shaped in each of its sections. Represent two allegories of the Glory of Mary painted by José Brel in 1863. The first is represented the Mary's Triumph over the Evil (as anagram and stepping the serpent) and the second Angels musicians sang praises to Mary. In this painting it can read a caption that says Regina Coeli Laetare Allelvia (Hail Queen of the Heaven, Alleluyah).

In the plinth of the walls, high reliefs in plaster with scenes from the Old and New Testament made by Francisco Molinelli in 1866. Presided over the oratorio an altarpiece with an image of the Virgin of the Rosary (patroness of the Marquisate) made in 1866 by José María García Martinez.

== Bibliography ==
- COLL, Jaume (coord.) The artistic and historical heritage of the Rabassa de Perellós and the Palacio de Dos Aguas. Valencia: Friends of the National Museum of Ceramics and Sumptuous Arts González Martí, 2005.
- ALADANA, Salvador. "The cover of the Palacio del Marqués de Dos Aguas in Valencia. Notes for a symbolic study". Traza y Baza, 1976, nº 6, pp. 89–97.
- SEBASTIÁN, Santiago. "New iconographic-iconological reading the cover of the Palacio del Marqués de Dos Aguas". Goya, 1989, nº 211–212, p. 60-64.
