= Felipe Garín Llombart =

Spanish art historian and museographer (1943–2023)

Felipe Vicente Garín Llombart (1943 – 6 September 2023) was a Spanish historian, writer, university professor, and museographer. He held senior positions in several educational and cultural institutions. Garín Llombart joined the board of trustees of the Museo del Prado in 1985, and served as the museum's director between 1991 and 1993.

== Life and career ==
Felipe Vicente Garín Llombart was a Spanish art historian and museographer who was born in Valencia in 1943. He was the son of Llombart Angeles Rodriguez and Felipe Garín Ortiz de Taranco.

He graduated in Law and Doctor of Philosophy and Letters from the University of Valencia, in 1967 he joined the Faculty of Museum Curators and in 1970 he became a professor of Art History at the Faculty of Fine Arts of the Polytechnic University of Valencia.

Garín Llombart held management positions at some of the country's main cultural institutions, one of the most important being his time – albeit brief – as director of the Prado museum.

From 1968 until 1990 he directed the Museu de Belles Arts de València (English: Museum of Fine Arts of Valencia), and between 1972 and 1987, the González Martí National Museum of Ceramics and Decorative Arts, in the same city.

He joined the board of directors of the Prado Museum in 1985, and later served as the museum's director between 1991 and 1993. Under his directorship, the fourth phase of the refurbishment works affecting more than fifty rooms was completed. Also during this time, in 1992, Picasso's Guernica was transferred to the Reina Sofía (MNCARS) museum from the Prado's Casón del Buen Retiro annex, after which the building was completely remodelled and the collections were rearranged.

He was national curator of Museums and Exhibitions and deputy director general of Museums from 1976 to 1979 and in 1993 he was appointed coordinator of the Institute of Conservation and Restoration of Cultural Heritage of the Ministry of Culture, where he remained until 1995.

That same year he was appointed director of the Cervantes Institute in Rome. In 1996 he was appointed director of the Spanish Academy in Rome and in 2002 president of the State Society for Cultural Action Abroad, a position he held until December 2004.

He was a member of the Royal Academies of Fine Arts of San Carlos and San Fernando, the Hispanic Society of America, the International Council of Museums, the Board of Trustees of the Sorolla Museum in Madrid, and the Advisory Council of the Valencian Institute of Modern Art.

He was also chairman of the Standing Committee of the Board of Trustees of the National Museum of Ceramics in Valencia; a member of the Board of Qualification, Valuation and Export of Heritage Assets; and member of the Advisory Board of the Valencia Institute of Modern Art.

== Merits and recognitions ==
- Silver Medal of Merit in Fine Arts. Ministry of Culture Spain (1982)
- Officer of the Republic, Order of Merit of the Italian Republic (1994).
- Encomienda de Número de la Orden al Mérito Civil. Spain (2002).
- Great Cross of the Order of Jaime I. Generalitat Valenciana (Valencia 2008).

== Institutions & memberships ==
- Honorary Director of the Museo Nacional del Prado since 1993.
- Member of the Royal Board of Trustees of the Museo Nacional del Prado from 1985 to 2003.
- Honorary Director of the San Pío V Fine Arts Museum of Valencia since 1991.
- President of the Permanent Commission and Vice President of the Plenary of the Board of Trustees of the National Museum of Ceramics of Valencia.
- Member of the Royal Academy of Fine Arts of San Carlos of Valencia, since 1973.
- Member of the Advisory Council of the Valencian Institute of Modern Art (IVAM), at the proposal of the Consell Valencià de Cultura, from its foundation until 2012.
- Corresponding member of the Real Academia de Bellas Artes de San Fernando de Madrid, since 1984.
- Member of the Board of Trustees of the Sorolla Museum Foundation in Madrid.
- Member of the Board of Qualification, Valuation and Export of Spanish Historical Heritage Assets of the Ministry of Culture, from 1980 to 2007.
- Corresponding member of the Hispanic Society of America, New York, since 1974.
- Member of the International Council of Museums (ICOM).
- Member of the Spanish Committee of Art Historians (CEHA).
- Member of the Valencian Association of Art Critics (AVCA).
