= Ignacio Vergara =

Spanish sculptor

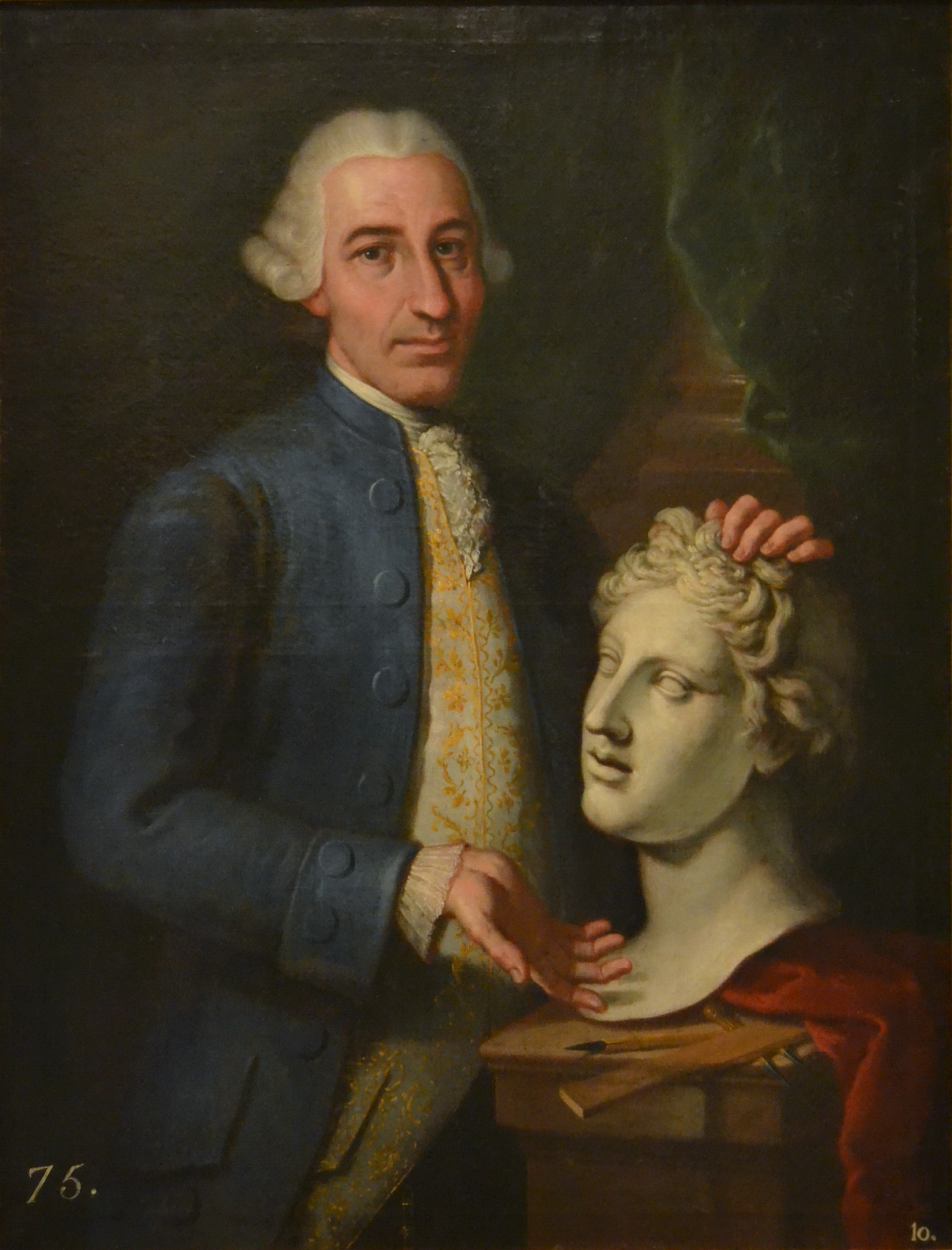
Portrait of Ignacio Vergara, by José Vergara Gimeno, Museu de Belles Arts de València.

Ignacio Vergara Gimeno (Valencia, 1715 - 13 April 1776, Valencia) was a Spanish Baroque sculptor.

== Life and work ==
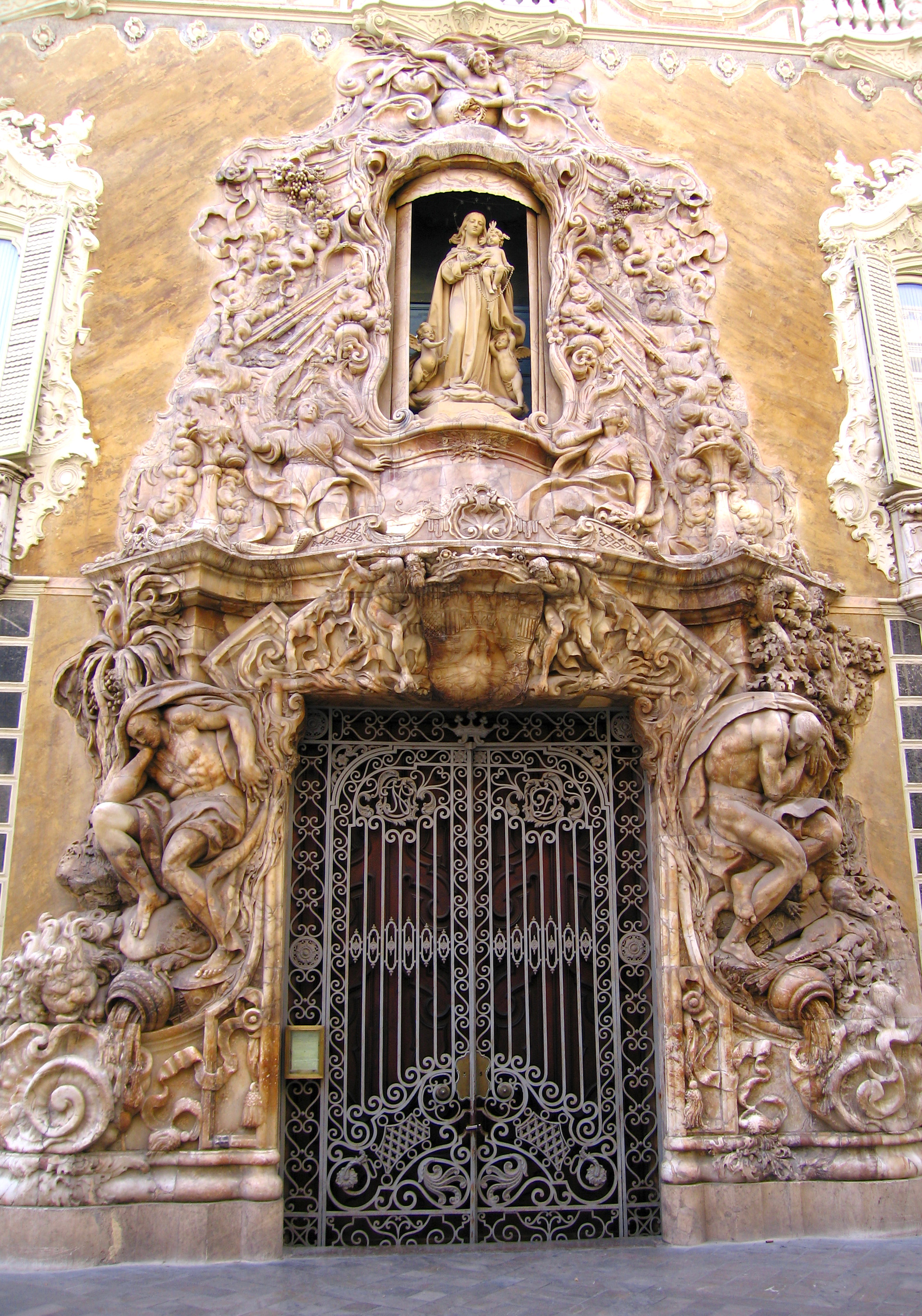
Portal at the Palace of the Marqués de Dos Aguas

He began his artistic apprenticeship in the studios of his father, Francisco Vergara, who was also a sculptor. His brother, José Vergara Gimeno began his career there as well, but went on to be a painter. Other influences during his formative years include Evaristo Muñoz and Konrad Rudolf.

He was one of the founders and Director-General of the Academia de Bellas Artes de Santa Bárbara, which later became the Real Academia de Bellas Artes de San Carlos de Valencia. He was also an Academician of Merit at the Real Academia de Bellas Artes de San Fernando in Madrid.

His best known work is the portal at the Palace of the Marqués de Dos Aguas, from an architectural design by Hipólito Rovira. Other notable works, all in stone, include the "Angels Venerating Mary" at Valencia Cathedral, several works at the Iglesia de las Escuelas Pías, a statue of saint Anthony the Great at the Iglesia de San Martín y San Antonio and one of Saint Bruno in the chapel at the University of Valencia. He also did large scale wood carvings.

All of these works are in the style of the late Baroque, or Rococo. One of his last works, an allegory of King Charles III, accompanied by Justice and Prudence, at the Palace of Justice, contains elements that are Neoclassical in nature.
