= Miguel Parra Abril =

Spanish artist (1780–1846)

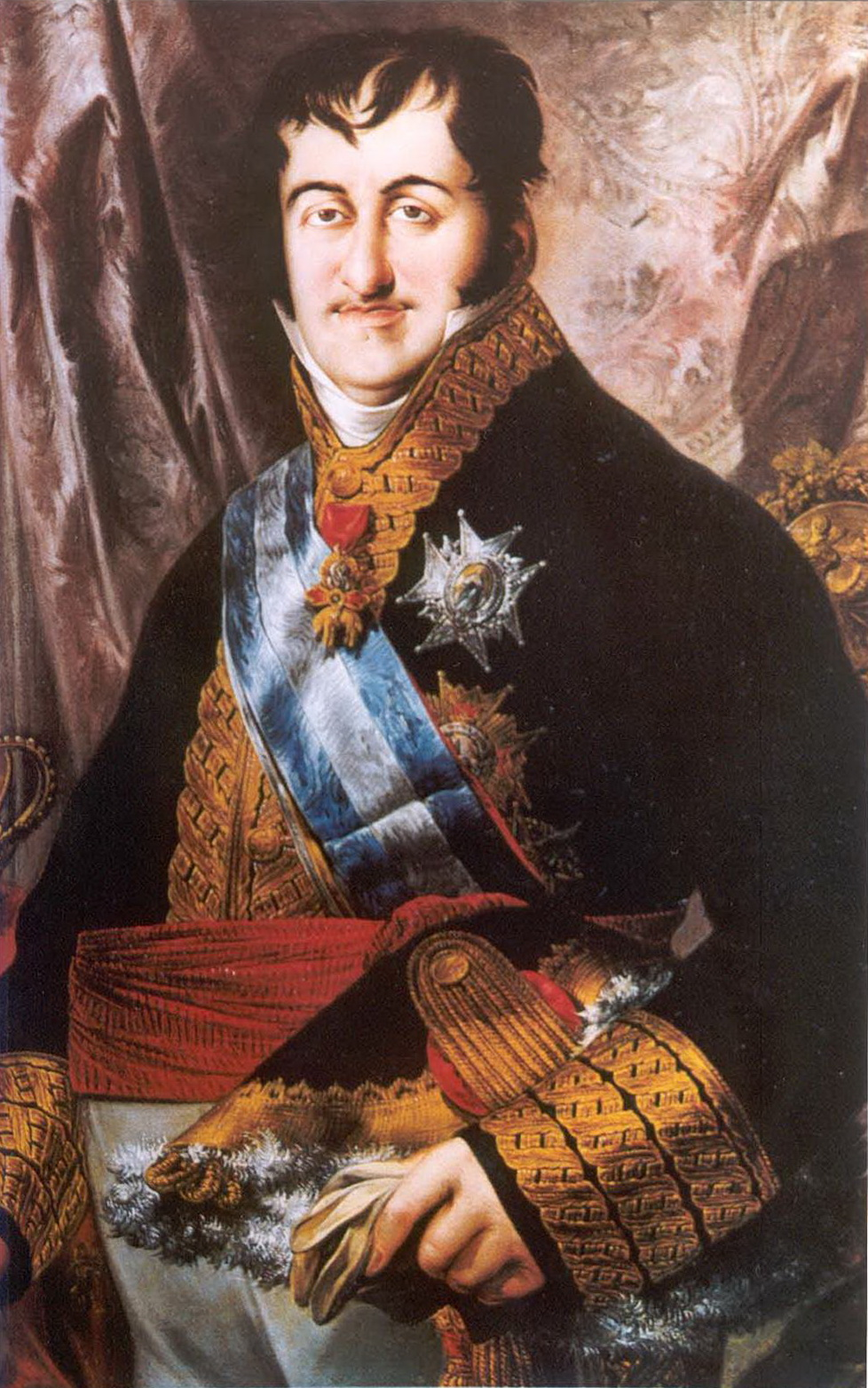
King Ferdinand VII, in military uniform

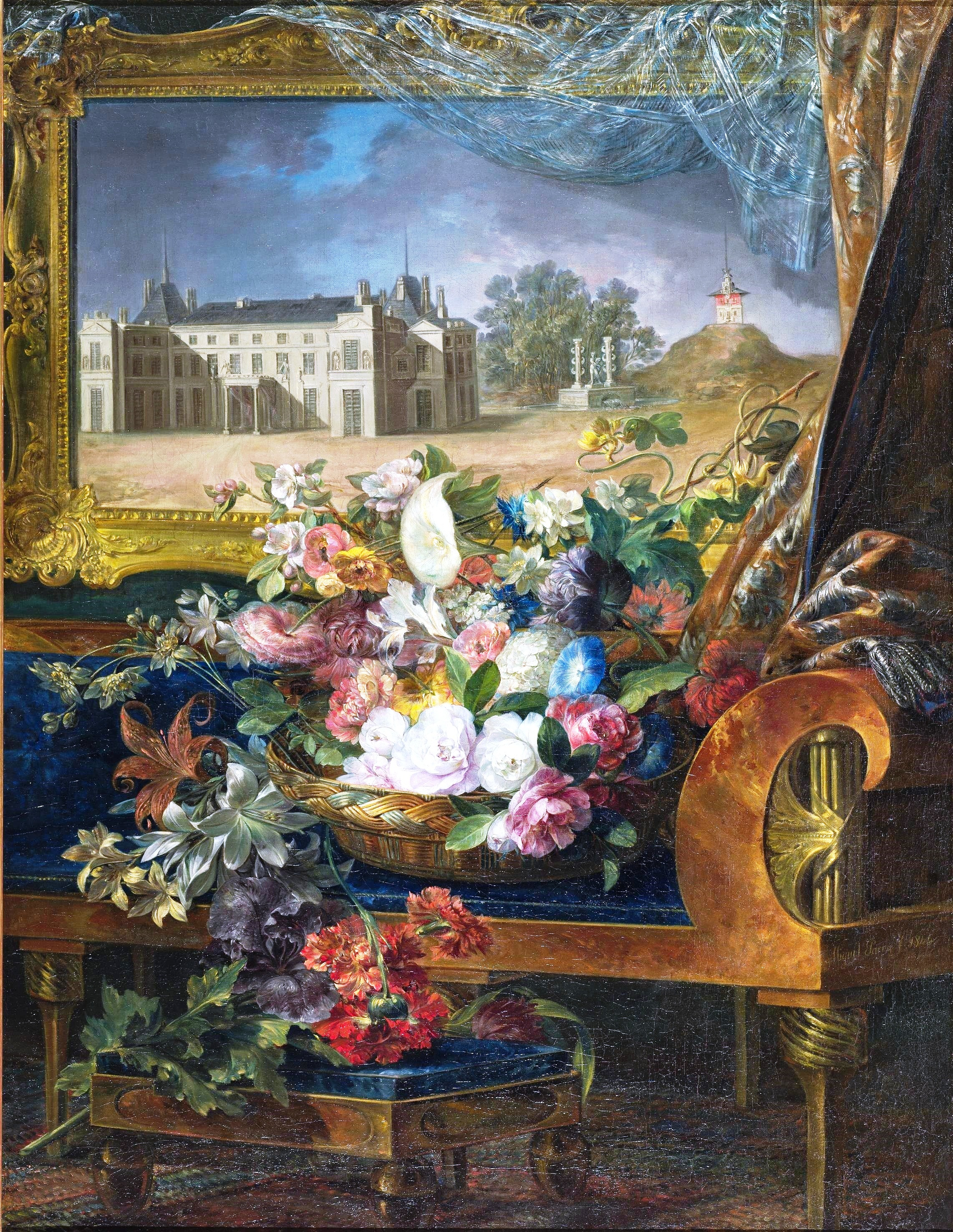
Flower Baskets with a View of the Royal Palace of Valencia

Miguel Parra Abril (1780, Valencia - 13 October 1846, Madrid) was a Spanish artist who served as court painter to King Ferdinand VII. He is best known for his portraits and still-lifes; mostly of floral arrangements. The famous portrait painter, Vicente López Portaña, was his brother-in-law.

== Biography ==
He studied with Benito Espinós, in the School of Flowers and Ornamentation at the Real Academia de Bellas Artes de San Carlos de Valencia. In 1803, he was named an Academician of Merit for flower painting there and, in 1811, received the same title for history painting. While there, he worked at the Estudio de Flores, where he created designs for the silk industry.

In 1812, he was appointed an assistant professor of painting at the Academia but, in 1814, failed to succeed Espinós as a professor. Due to this, in 1815, following the Peninsular War, he moved to Madrid, where he presented the King with several canvases depicting the King's recent triumphal return.

This earned him a royal appointment. He eventually had to return to Valencia, due to his parents' poor health, but continued to submit paintings to the court; receiving an annual pension of 600 Ducats. In 1821, he was named Director of Painting at the Academia and, two years, became General Director.

After the death of King Ferdinand, he continued to be associated with the court; becoming the favorite painter of the Regent, Maria Christina. Following the Confiscation of 1836, he was entrusted with the collection of works that came into the government's possession from the Convent of Carmen, which now forms part of the Museu de Belles Arts de Valencia.

He oversaw the career of his son, José Felipe (1824–1864), who also became a painter. He died while accompanying Josép on a trip to Madrid; to present his works to Queen Isabella II.

His works may be seen at the Museu de Belles Artes, the Royal Palace of Madrid and Valencia cathedral, among others.
