= Cristóbal Valero =

Spanish painter

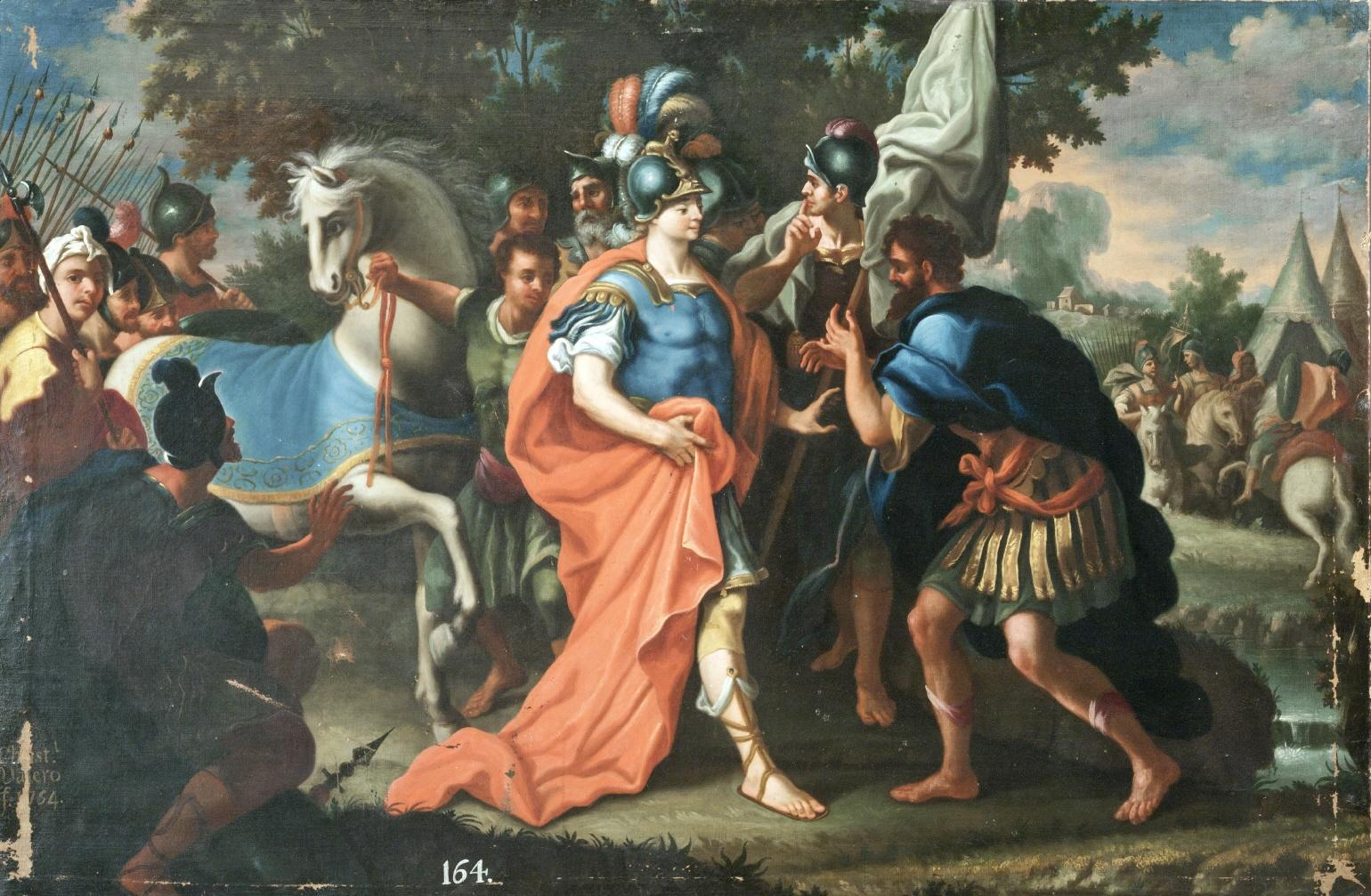
Mentor Giving Lessons to Telemachus (1754)

Cristóbal Valero (1707 in Alboraya – December 1789) was a Spanish painter and presbyter.

== Biography ==
He originally studied philosophy, but also trained as a painter with Evaristo Muñoz. He then went to Rome to study under Sebastiano Conca. He was ordained a priest and returned to Valencia, where he participated in creating the Academia de Bellas Artes de Santa Bárbara. In 1762, he was named an Academician of Merit at the Real Academia de Bellas Artes de San Fernando. Six years later, he became the first Director of painting at the Real Academia de Bellas Artes de San Carlos de Valencia.

Contemporary sources mention several of his works in Valencian churches and monasteries, although many have not been identified and may have been destroyed or painted over. He is also credited with some portraits of bishops at the Archbishop's Palace and two paintings of scenes from Don Quixote which are in the Museo del Prado and were originally attributed to Valero Iriarte.

== Sources ==
- Bryan, Michael (1889). Walter Armstrong; Robert Edmund Graves (eds.). Dictionary of Painters and Engravers, Biographical and Critical. Vol. II L-Z. London: George Bell and Sons. p. 606.
- Madrazo, Pedro de (1872). Catálogo Descriptivo e Histórico del Museo del Prado de Madrid (Parte Primera: Escuelas Italianas y Españolas). Calle del Duque de Osuna #3; Original from Oxford University, Digitized May 1, 2007: M. Rivadeneyra. p. 583.
