= Felipe Garín Ortiz de Taranco =

Spanish art historian

Felipe Maria Garin Ortiz de Taranco (14 February 1908 – 7 June 2005) was a Spanish writer, researcher and Academician of art.

Born in Valencia, he was member of Real Academia de Bellas Artes de San Carlos de Valencia (Spain) in 1940, in this institution he exercised as president for more than two decades, the period 1974–1999.

== Career ==
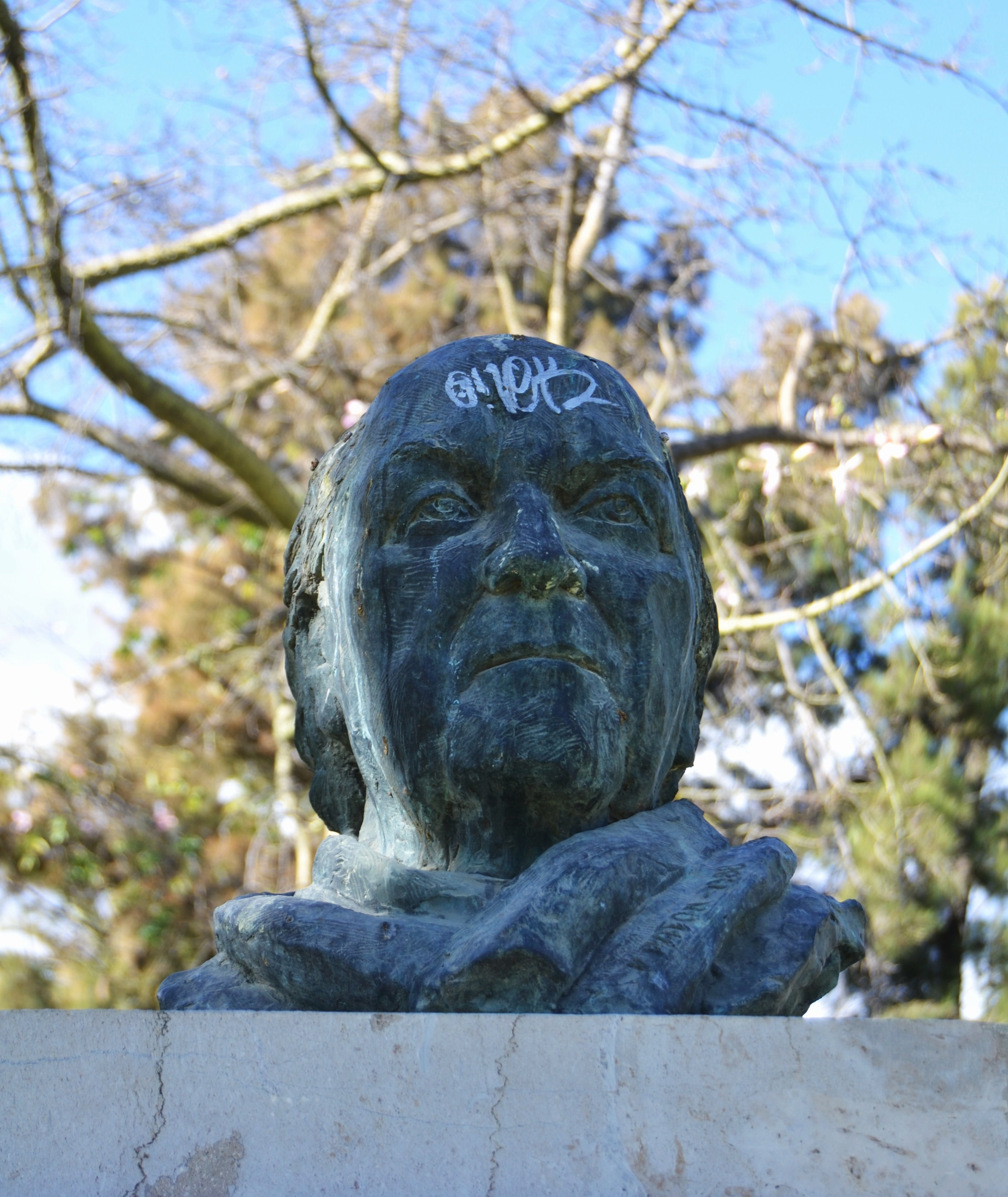
Estatua Felipe Garin Ortiz de Taranco

Because of its dual legal and historical formation, Felipe Garin could practice in both fields, but not equally. His interest in history began soon and most of his career he served as art historian. He was president of the Real Academia de Bellas Artes de San Carlos de Valencia (Spain) from 1974, and director of the journal "Archivo del Arte Valenciano" a referent in Valencian Art. He was honored referee of the College Doctors and Graduates in Philosophy and Letters and Sciences of the University of Valencia and was the head of Service Artistic Information, archaeological and ethnological of the university of Valencia. He was also president of the Provincial Commission of Monuments and Historical- Artistic elements of Valencia. He was also member of Academy of Valencian Culture; Institute Alfonso El magnanimo, and promoted and defended Valencian Culture and language along his career. He was a corresponding member of the Royal Academic of History of Madrid, the Real Academia de Bellas Artes de San Fernando, the Real Academy of Fine Arts of San Jorge de Barcelona, the Real Academia de Bellas Artes de Santa Isabel de Hungría (Seville), the Royal Academy Hispanoamericana (Cádiz), the Velez Academy of Fine Arts at Ecija (Sevilla), and The Hispanic Society of America.

Among the many awards received include: the gold medal for Cultural Merit awarded by the Ministry of Culture, the Cross of the Order of Alfonso X, National Prize of Literature and Art Criticism, Spanish National Superior Research Council Award, Gold Medal of the "Circulo de Bellas Artes" in Valencia, Gold Medal of the University Politécnica of Valencia and Medal of the Faculty of Fine Arts in Valencia.

He received the High Distinction of the Generalitat Valenciana Cultural Merit in 1995. Also, it has a statue located in 1993 in the "Jardines de Viveros" a park close to the San Pio V Museum of Valence where he performed his activity and also names a street about his hometown Valencia. He was a candidate on several occasions "Prince of Asturias prize" in Fine Arts.

He published numerous books and artistic monographs, them, aspects of the Valencian Gothic architecture, Loa and elegy Palomino painter in decoration of Santos Juanes Church of Valencia, El libro de horas del conde-duque de Olivares and "La visión de España de Sorolla" among others.

== Personal life ==
He was married to Llombart Angeles Rodriguez, with they had two children; Mary Angels and Felipe. He was very rooted in social and cultural life of their neighborhood, the neighborhood of el Carmen, where discoursed all his life. His son Felipe Garín Llombart was director of the Museum Prado (1991-1993), director of the Academy of Spain in Rome and also director of the Museum of Fine Arts in Valencia between 1969 and 1990.

== Death ==
He died in Valencia on 7 June 2005 being buried in the General Cemetery of Valencia. Felipe Garin's library was donated by his wife and families to the Valencian National Library located at the monastery "Monasterio de San Miguel de los Reyes".

== Awards and distinctions ==
- Cruz de Alfonso X el Sabio 1945
- Premi 9 Octubre: Distinción de la Generalitat Valenciana al Mérito Cultural, 1995
- Accésit del Premio Nacional de Literatura, por la sección de crítica de arte, en 1945.
- Premio "Cerdá Reig" de Investigaciones Científicas de la Delegación del CSIC, en 1964.
- Premiado por la Diputación Provincial de Valencia, dentro de la línea de investigación "Gótico valenciano y arte del siglo XVIII", realizada en el departamento de la facultad y servicio de estudios artísticos, en 1965.
- Medalla de Oro de la Delegación Provincial del Ministerio de Cultura, en 1980.
- Medalla de Oro de la Facultad de Bellas Artes de Valencia, en 1982.
- Premio Nacional del Colegio de Doctores de España, en 1982.
- Medalla de Oro al Mérito Cultural de la Delegación en Valencia del Ministerio de Cultura, en 1984.
- Medalla de Oro de la Universidad Politécnica de Valencia, en 1988.
- Medalla al Mérito de las Bellas Artes concedida por la Academia de San Carlos, en 1994.

== Bibliography ==
- Blasco Gil, Yolanda; Peset, Fernanda; Ferrer Sapena, Antonia (2014). «Trayectoria académica y social». En Yolanda Ayala Gascón. Felipe María Garín Ortiz de Taranco: trayectoria académica, social y científica. Universitat Politècnica de València. pp. 17–128. ISBN 978-84-9048-195-0.
- FELIPE Mª GARIN ORTIZ DE TARANCO (2004). «MI SIGLO XX: MEMORIAS» Ed. UNIVERSIDAD POLITECNICA DE VALENCIA. SERVICIO DE PUBLICACION. ISBN 978-84-9705-670-0.
