= Rococo in Spain =

Architectural style

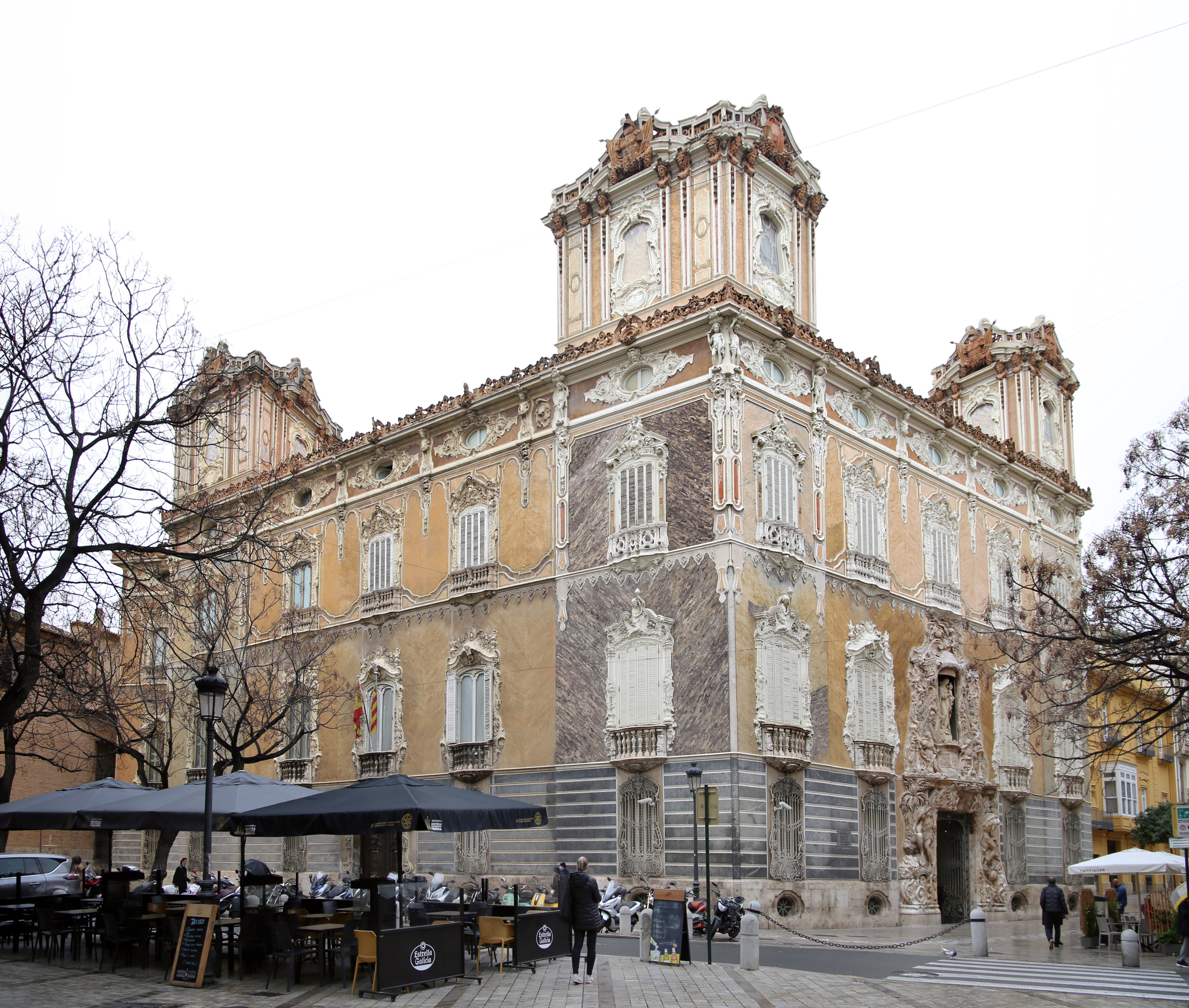
Palace of the Marqués de Dos Aguas built in the 15th-18th centuries, in Valencia, Valencian Community, Spain.

Rococo in Spain of the 18th century is relatively unexplored and bears little resemblance to its French equivalent. Under the reign of Philip V of the Bourbon Dynasty, architectural commissions were primarily awarded to Italian architects, rather than the French who were the pioneers of the rococo style. This is largely due to the influence of his second wife, Elisabeth Farnese of Parma, who aimed to transcend French influence through the promotion of the Italians. Consequently, Rococo was left to be discovered by the Spanish school and therefore evolved separately from French and other variations of Rococo.

Rococo, also referred to as Late Baroque, originated in Paris, France in the 1730s as a continuation of the Baroque style. It is a highly dramatic and ornamental style of art and architecture characterized by its lavish curves and counter-curves, white and pastel colors, asymmetry, and elements that represent nature. Elements such as acanthus leaves, shells, flowers, birds, angels, fruit, musical instruments, and even chinoiserie (Chinese and Japanese motifs), were all common Rococo motifs.

Rococo in Spain never culminated to be its own distinct style, as such the rococo style was not greatly present in 18th-century Spain. It was essentially a decorative progression of the Spanish Baroque used in conjunction with other elements of Spanish origin. Though there are a few examples, primarily in the court of the newly established Bourbon Dynasty.

== Architecture ==
Spanish Rococo architecture was applied to exteriors as well as interiors and was preferred for use in churches, which is in direct contrast with French Rococo which was primarily used in the secular domains and was typically reserved for interior decoration. Additionally, the chinoiserie element is decidedly uncommon in Spanish Rococo. Altarpieces, commonly called reredos, were also a popular element of Rococo in Spain.

Some of the most magnificent examples of Spanish Rococo can be found in the court of Madrid. Including the Royal Palace of Madrid, commissioned in 1738 by Philip V. Within the palace are the Salón de Gasparini, Salón de Porcelana, and Salón del Trono halls. Inside which further examples of Spanish Rococo such as the royal throne, twelve monumental mirrors, and many examples of rococo furniture.

Other examples include the Royal Palace of Aranjuez, the Basílica pontificia de San Miguel, the Palace of the Marqués de Dos Aguas, Salamanca Cathedral, and the west façade of the Murcia Cathedral.

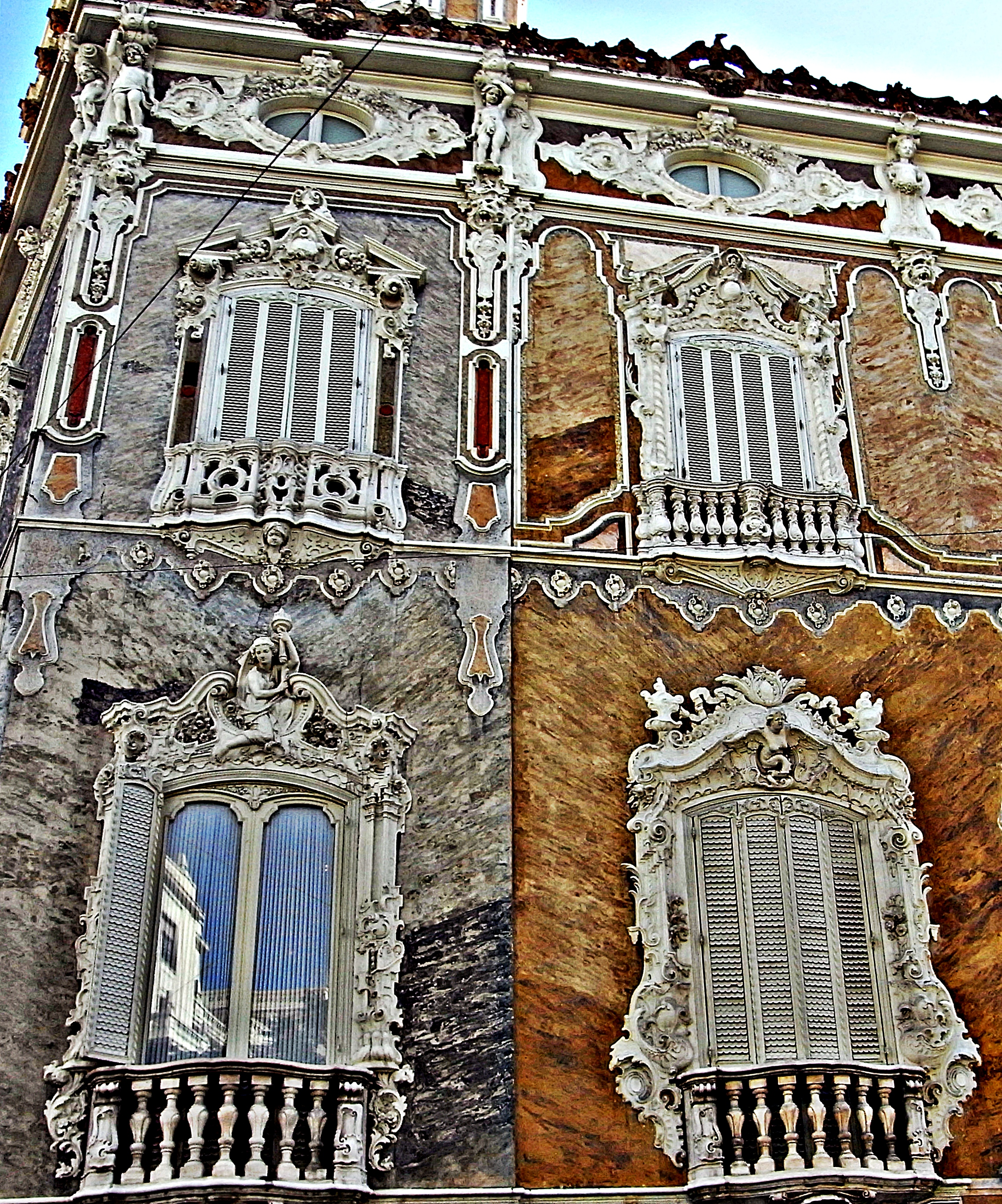
Palace of the Marqués de Dos Aguas in Valencia

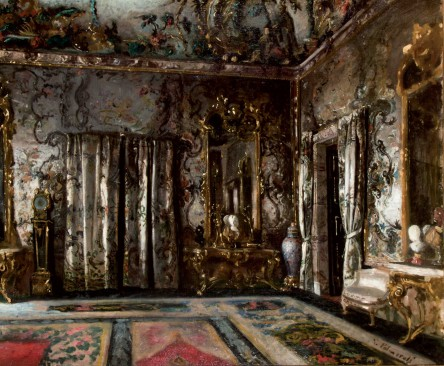
Salón de Gasparini hall in the Royal Palace of Madrid

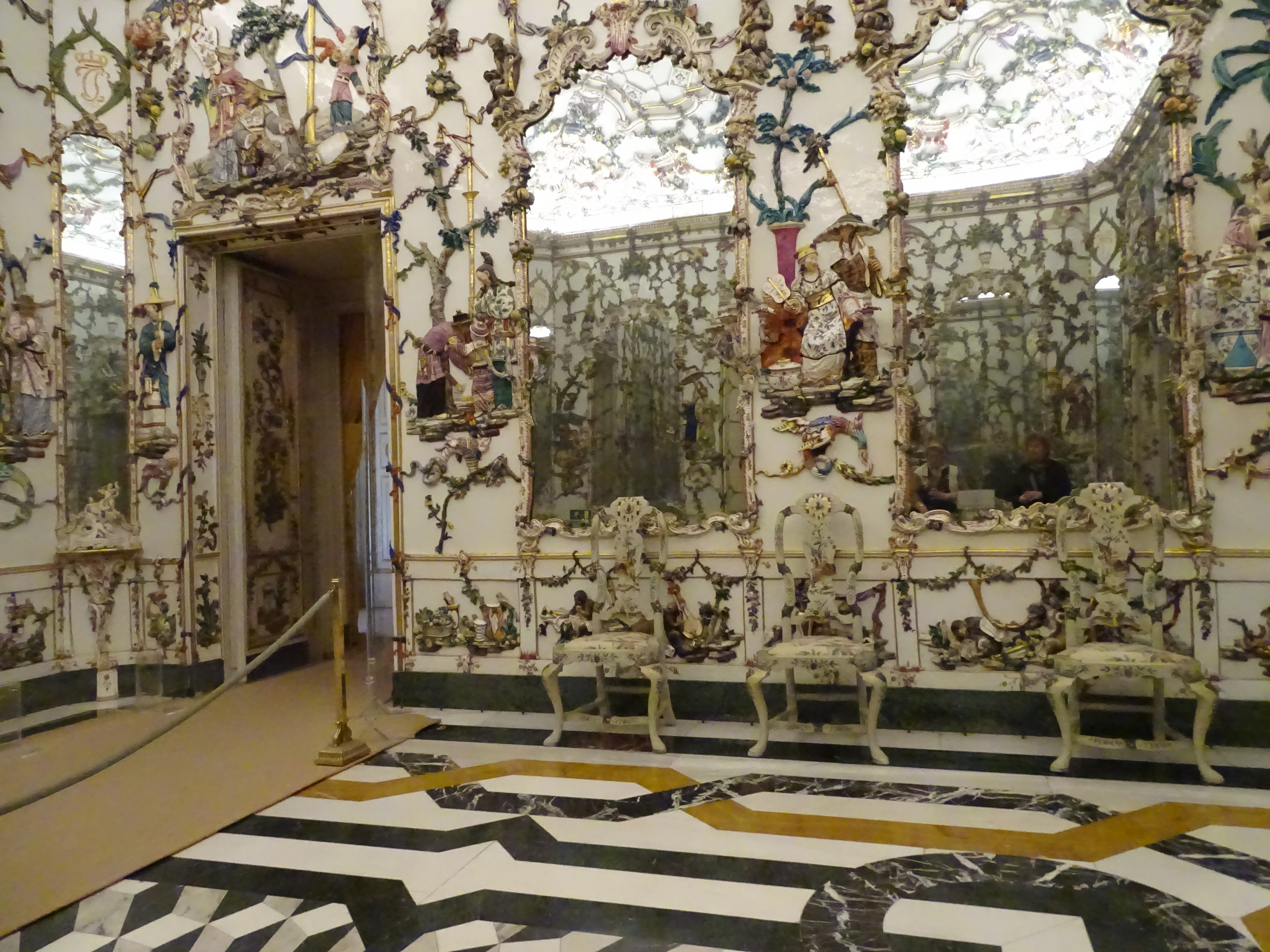
Gabinete de Porcelana hall in the Royal Palace of Aranjuez

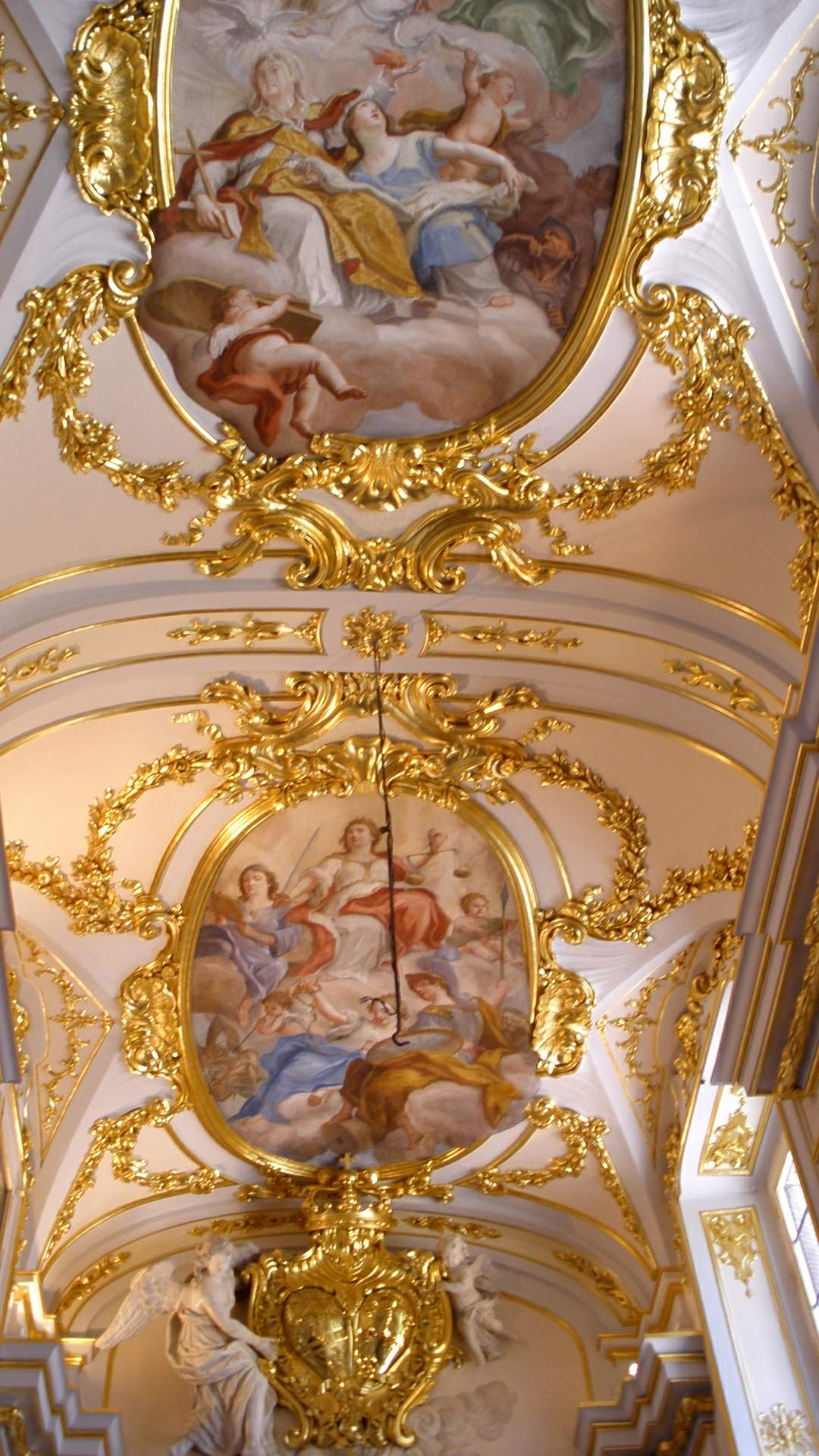
Real Colegiata de La Granja de San Idelfonso in San Ildefonso

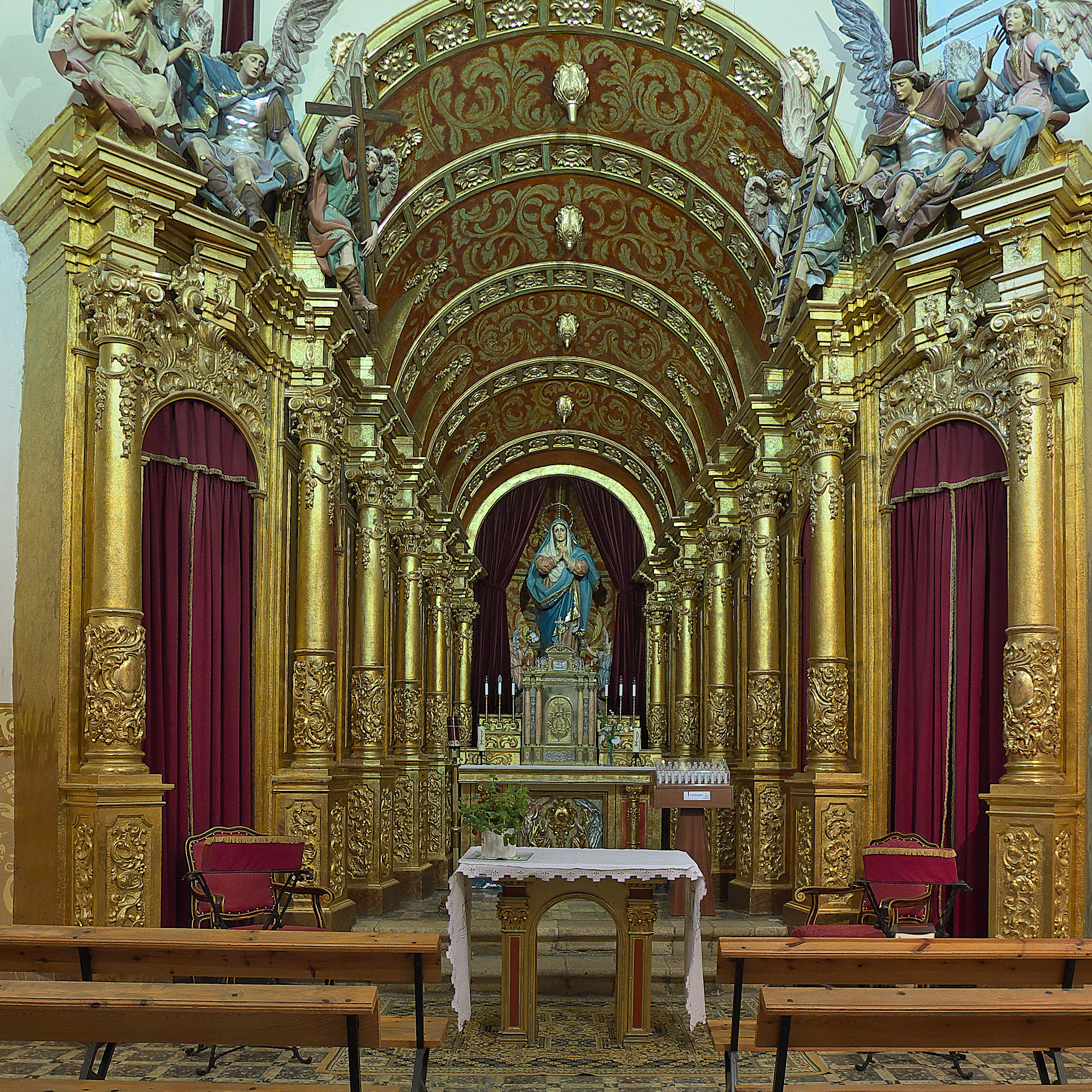
Chapel de los Dolores of the Iglesia de la Purificación church in La Iglesuela del Cid

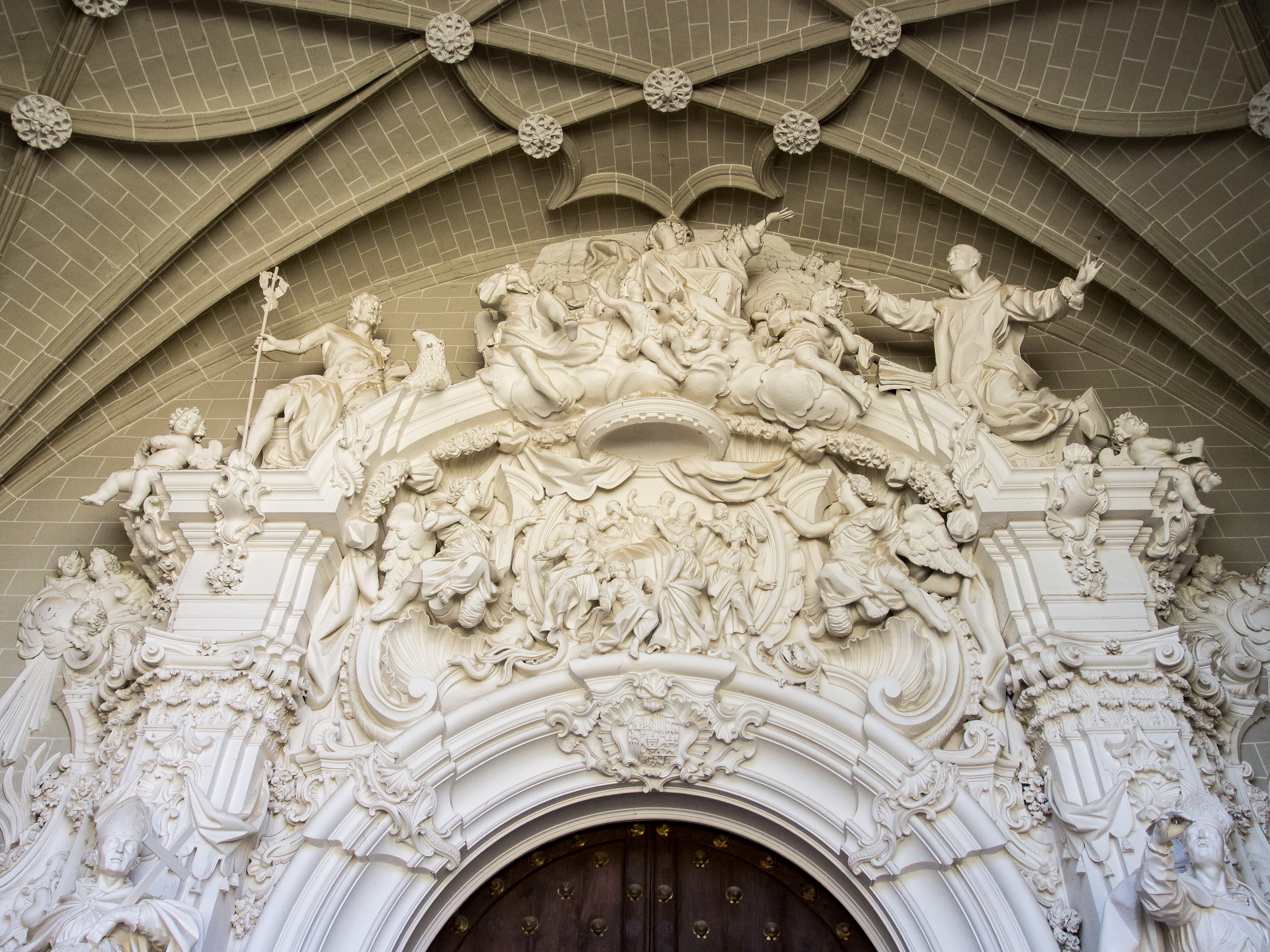
The portal of the Charterhouse of Aula Dei

== See also ==
- Rococo architecture in Portugal

== Bibliography ==
- Neuman, Robert. 2013. Baroque and Rococo art and architecture. Pearson Education.
- Tadgell, Christopher. 2013. Transformations: Baroque and Rococo in the age of absolutism and the Church Triumphant (Vol. 6). Routledge.
- Taylor, R. C. 1952. Rococo in Spain: A Neglected Aspect of 18th Century Art. The Architectural Review (London), 442(667), 9.
