= González Martí National Museum of Ceramics and Decorative Arts =

Decorative arts museum in Valencia, Spain

National Museum of Ceramics and Decorative Arts González Martí
- Museo Nacional de Cerámica y de las Artes Suntuarias González Martí
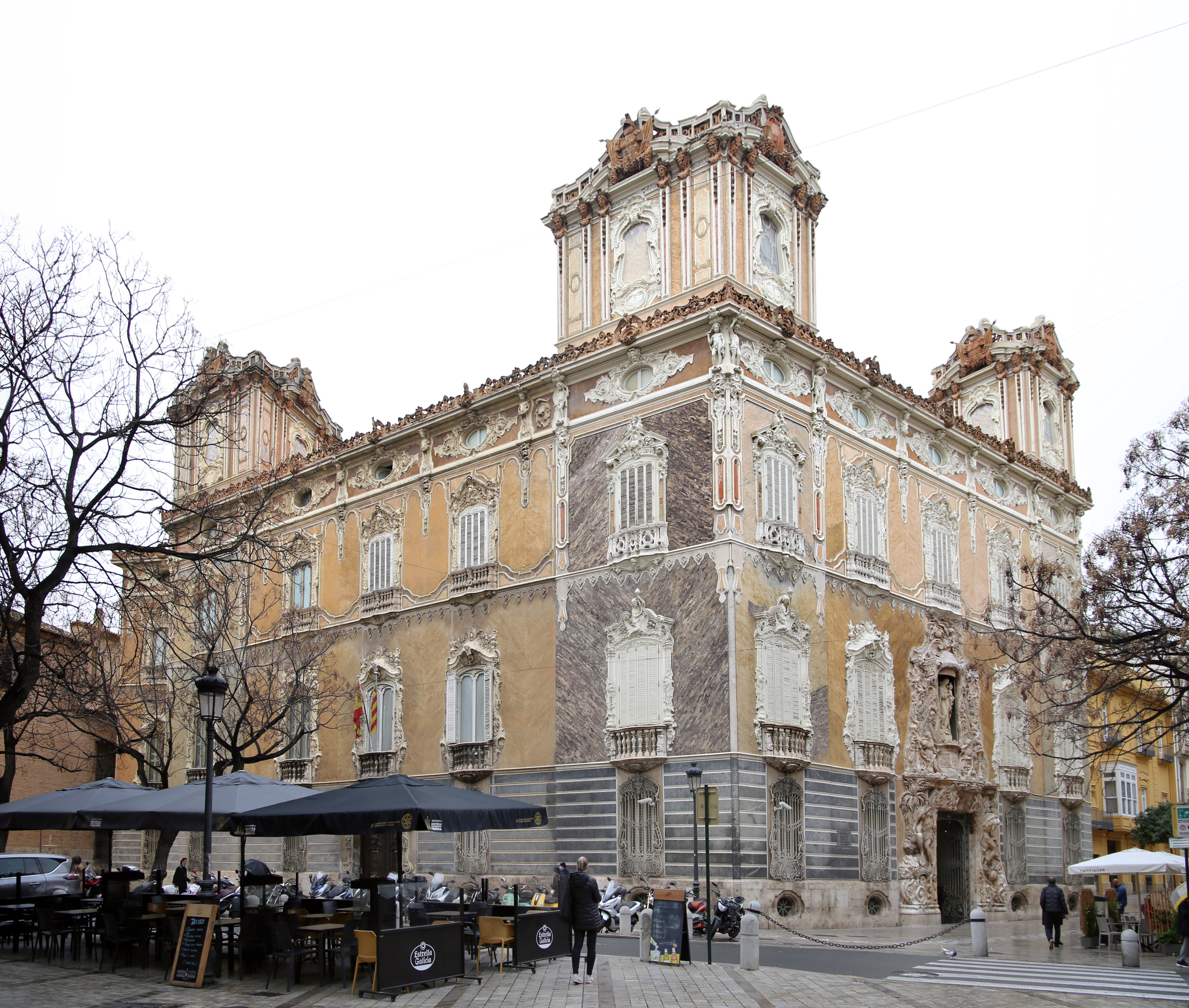
- Façade of the museum
- Established: 1947
- Location: Palace of the Marqués de Dos Aguas, Valencia, Spain
- Coordinates: 39°28′22″N 0°22′29″W
- Type: Art museum
- Director: Jaume Coll Conesa
- Public transit access: Colón
- Website: mnceramica.mcu.es

Spanish Cultural Heritage
- Official name: Museo Nacional de Cerámica y Artes suntuarias
- Type: Non-movable
- Criteria: Monument
- Designated: 1 March 1962
- Reference no.: RI-51-0001414

The National Museum of Ceramics and Decorative Arts González Martí (Spanish: Museo Nacional de Cerámica y de las Artes Suntuarias González Martí) is a museum in Valencia, Spain, devoted to ceramics –with special importance to Valencian ceramics, porcelains and other decorative arts such as textile art, traditional costumes, and furniture. It is one of the National Museums of Spain, and it is attached to the Ministry of Culture.

Housed in the Palace of the Marqués de Dos Aguas, it was founded on 7 February 1947, from the donation of Manuel González Martí's ceramics collection. Seven years later, once the restoration of the palace was completed, the museum opened to the public on 18 June 1954.

== Building ==
The palace, originally a Gothic building, was fully reshaped to Baroque in the mid-18th century, when Hipolito Rovira designed its façade, made by the Valencian sculptor Ignacio Vergara. Nowadays, as the result of several later remodelings, it combines mainly Rococo, Neoclassical and Oriental style.

Declared a historical-artistic monument in 1941, the building was bought by the state in 1949 to contain the Gonzalez Martí ceramics collection. Since then, there have been numerous interventions, including infrastructure improvements and renovation of the museum spaces. The last restoration took place between 1990 and 1998, carried out by the architect Ginés Sánchez Hevia.

=== Ground floor ===
Mostly dedicated to temporary exhibitions, on this floor is the remarkable "carriage patio" (so named because it was the carriage house and the stables) and the main stairs.

=== First floor ===
The first floor spans the private rooms of the Marquis de Dos Aguas, decorated with stucco, wall and ceiling paintings made by artists such as Plácido Frances y Pascual, José Felipe Parra and José Brel Guiralt in the 19th century. The marble floors are of different colors, with the initials "MD", for the Marquis de Dos Aguas.

Outstanding rooms are the Ballroom, the Red Room, and the Eastern Sitting Room (also known as the Porcelain Sitting Room), equipped with part of the original furniture. All the rooms are ornamented with works of art, lamps, clocks, vases, etc., reflecting the elegance and style of the time.

=== Second floor ===
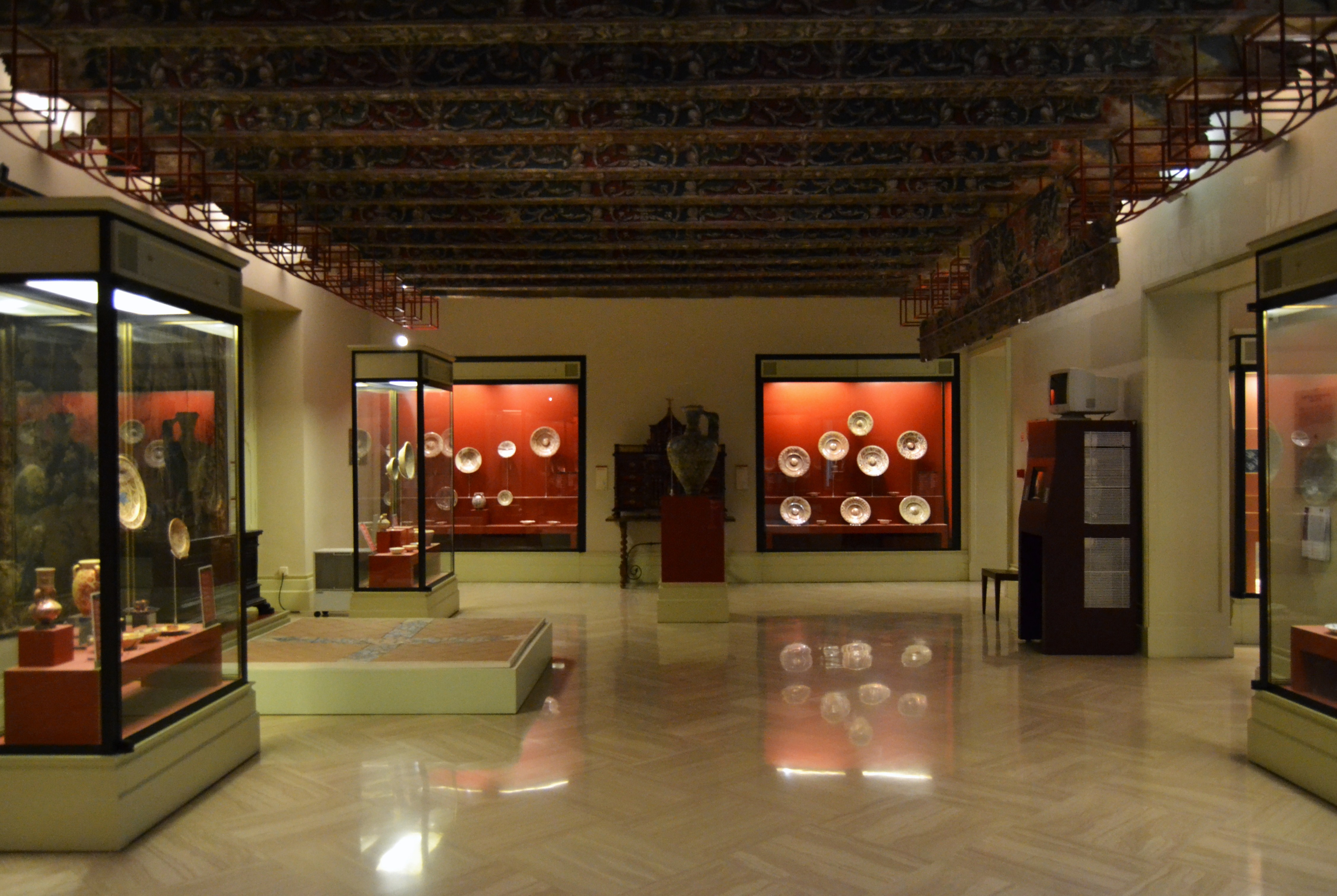
Hall of ceramics from the 16th, 17th and 18th century (second floor)

Divided into several rooms, this floor is entirely dedicated to the exhibition of the ceramics collection, including one adapted to reproduce a typical Valencian kitchen, designed by Manuel González Martí, with mosaics, friezes and decorative panels of the 18th and 19th centuries. The decoration of this space is complemented with popular contemporary ceramic pots and copper objects.

== Collections ==
In 1969 the museum increased its collection with numerous pieces of furniture, clothing, and paintings, with special focus on Valencian tradition and local artists.

=== Clothing ===
The museum has received many valuable donations of ancient costumes since its foundation. In the past, the pieces were presented on wood mannequins with accessories as umbrellas, hats, blankets or fans. As light and the dust which accumulated on the costumes caused considerable deterioration over time, it was agreed to withdraw the permanent collection, publishing catalogues and planning temporary exhibitions to show some pieces to the public.

Included in the fabrics collection are a series of twelve decorative Coptic textiles fragments, highlighting a tabulae with fig leaves decoration, dated between 140 and 380 AD; a fabric with polychrome bands dated between 210 and 390 AD; a fragment with dark background and two-colored decoration (probably taken from geometric mosaics) dated between 250 and 420 AD; and other fragments divided into three ornamental strips with putti and ducks on the central part and riders contained by side scrolls in laterals. This collection was purchased in el Rastro in 1964 by González Martí.

=== Painting ===
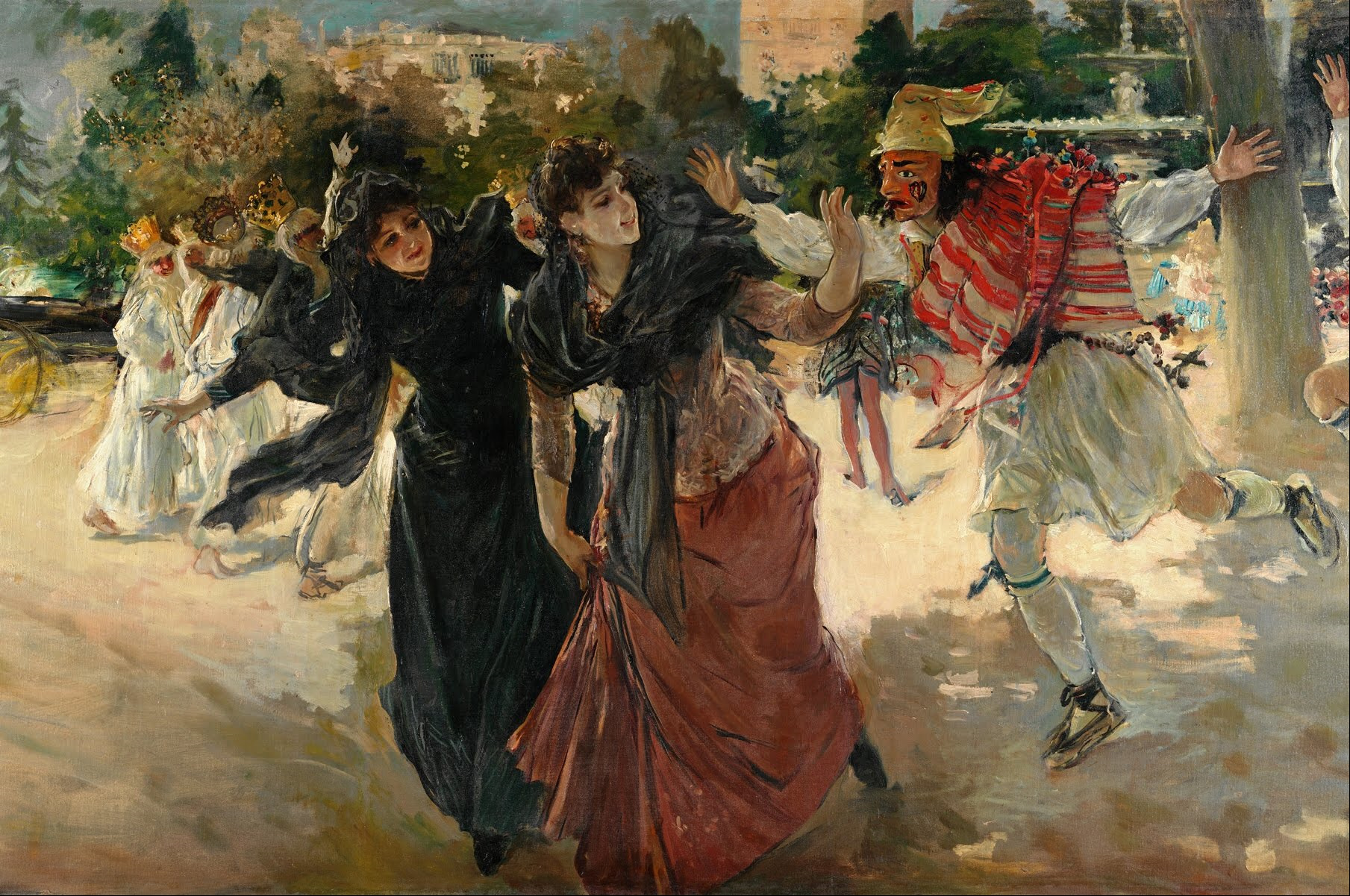
Ignacio Pinazo - Carnival evening in the "Alameda" (detail). Oil on canvas, 1889. González Martí National Museum of Ceramics and Decorative Arts.

The museum contains paintings such as José Vicente Perez y Vela's Immaculate Conception (1860); San Vicente Martir, an anonymous work acquired in 1917, dated from the early 17th century and defrocked from the Cistercian monastery of Santa María de Benifassà; and several works from Ignacio Pinazo, a 19th-century Valencian painter.

Another important quantity of paintings arrived at the museum because of the intervention of its founder, through the Commission for the Protection and Salvage of Valencian Artistic Treasures, in charge of protecting art objects at the beginning of the Spanish Civil War. Among these works there are two oils on panel depicting St. Francis of Assisi and St. Vincent Ferrer, probably tabernacle doors and attributed to Nicolás Borrás (Joan de Joanes' disciple).

While most paintings are religious, there are also portraits and landscapes such as a rural landscape at sunset and a view of a harbor at dawn, under the influence of Dutch painting.

Other pieces come from private donations or from the artists themselves, including Ricardo Verde Rubio, José Benlliure and Ignasi Pinazo i Camarlench.

=== Ceramics ===
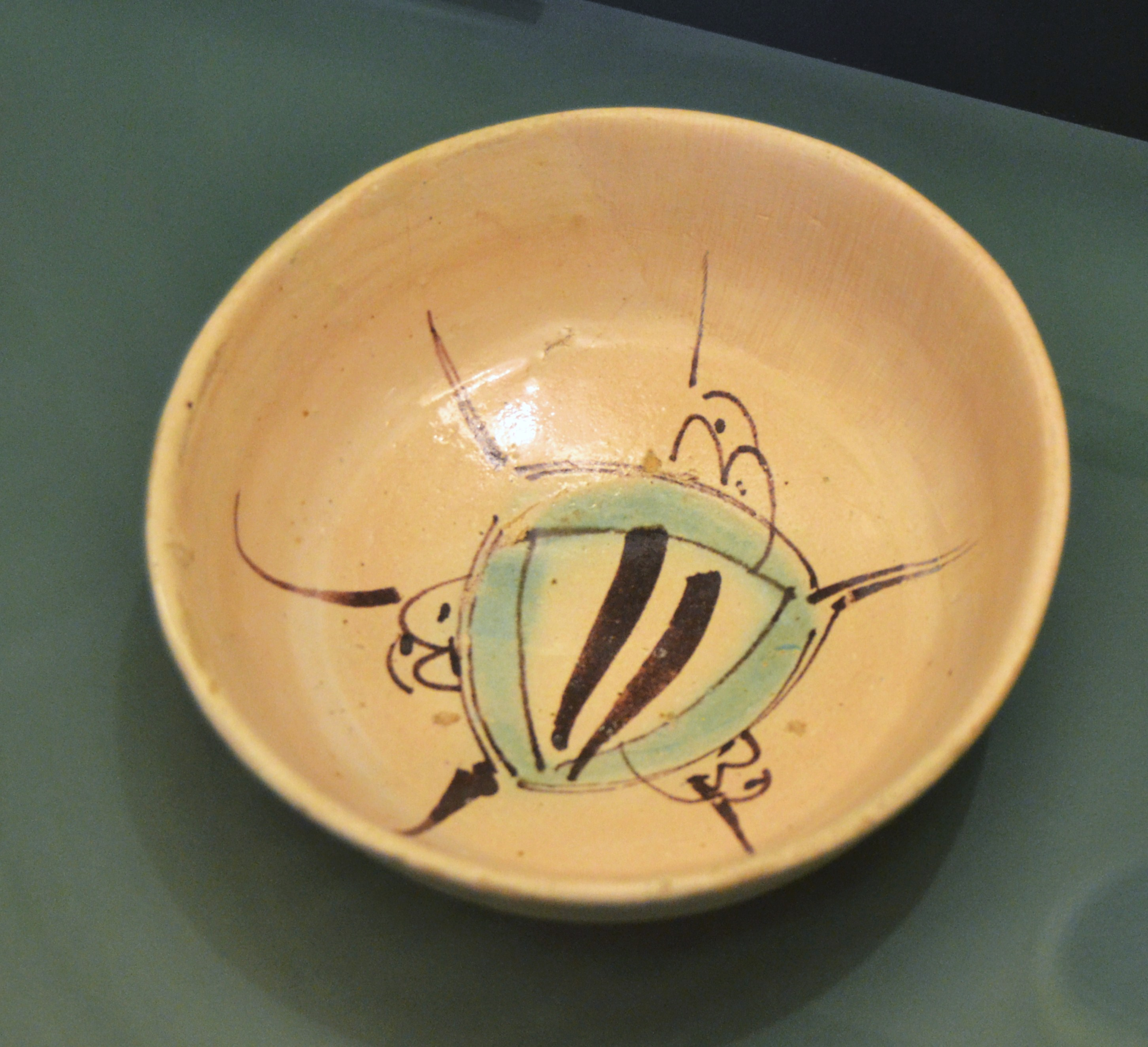
Medieval bowl from Paterna (14th century). González Martí National Museum of Ceramics and Decorative Arts.

The museum's collection ranges from antique pottery (Greek, Iberian and Roman) to modern pieces. The first collection, donated by founder González Martí, consisted of about 6.000 items, mostly ceramics from the medieval period (including ceramic objects from Manises and Paterna and Hispano-Moresque ware) to popular 19th-century Valencian tiles.

Hispano-Moresque ware is well represented by 13th- and 14th-century pieces decorated in green and manganese, lusterware, or other with white stanniferous enamel or cobalt blue luster. These types of Muslim ceramics gave way to the technical basics of 15th century Spanish pottery and Christian production. The Gonzalez Martí collection shows works from different places, mainly Italian and Spanish productions.

There are medieval architectonical pieces from diverse Valencian palaces and headquarters, such as heraldic shields or floor tiles (orders made by aristocracy or institutions) and socarrats, destined to interior ceilings, terraces friezes, stairs or other places. Local pieces are exhibited with other contemporary of Spanish and Italian production.

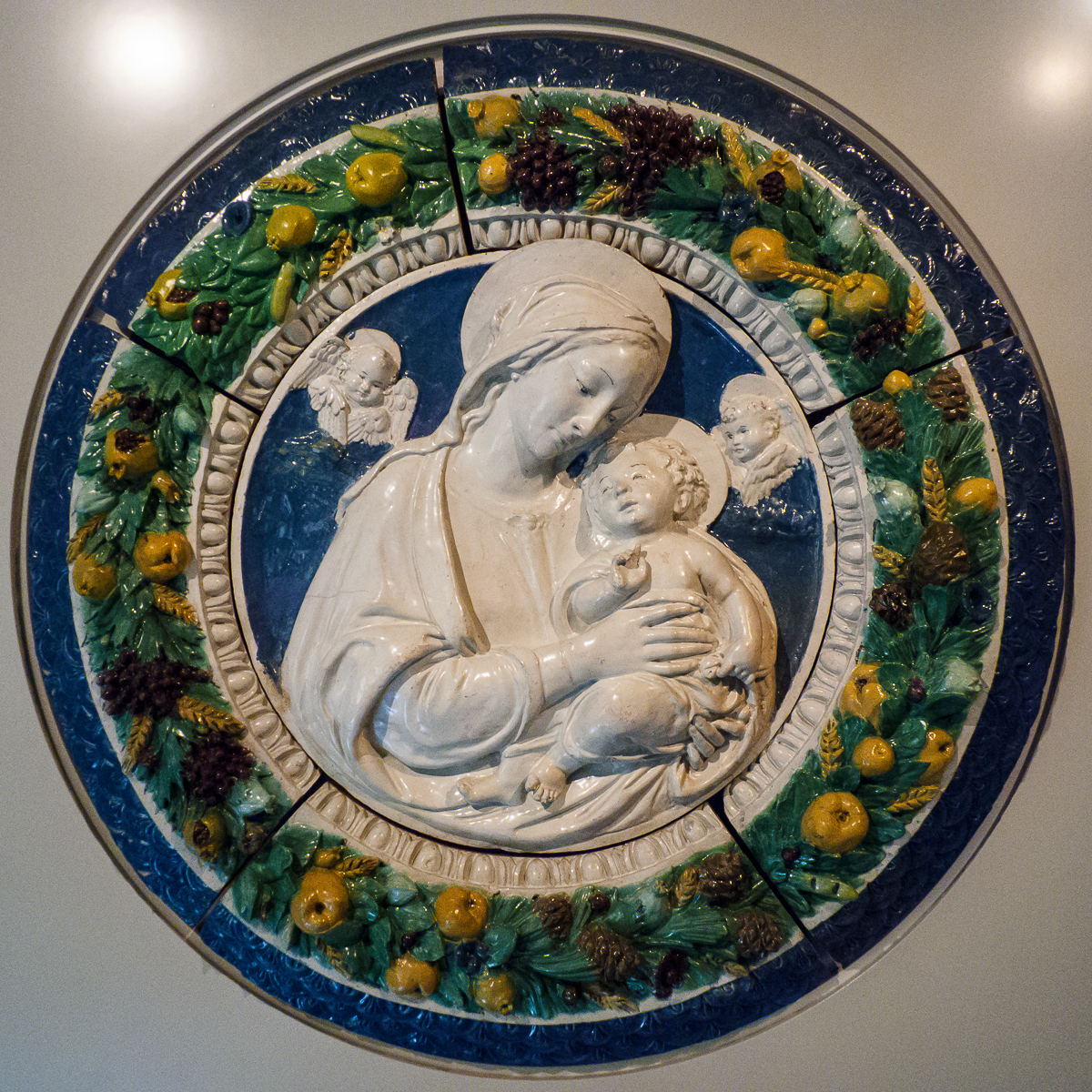
17th-century Florentine tondo depicting Madonna and child, attributed to the manufacture of Benedetto Buglioni’s workshop

At the time of the Renaissance, Florence was a producer of polychrome glazed ceramics, which arrived to Spain through the continental trade. One example of this type of ceramic is a 17th-century Florentine tondo depicting Madonna and child, attributed to the manufacture of Benedetto Buglioni’s workshop.

In the collection are several pieces from the Royal Factory of Alcora, whose ceramic and porcelain works influenced Valencian centers, especially Manises, that introduced polychrome pieces.

Since 2012 the museum has owned an 18th-century Neapolitan nativity scene that consists of 29 figures ranging between 10 and 40 cm, made with wire body, wooden limbs and terracotta head, dressed with fine period clothes and decked with rich accessories.

Between the latest showed objects, there are Modernist works of the Valencian sculptor Benlliure and some ceramic pieces of the 20th century donated by Pablo Picasso.

=== Other collections ===
Displayed in the Carriage patio are the Nymphs' coach designed by Hipólito Rovira and Ignacio Vergara in 1753; an Empire style carriage, owned by the Marquis de Llanera; and a Rococo sedan chair, also of the 18th century.
