= Evaristo Muñoz =

Spanish painter

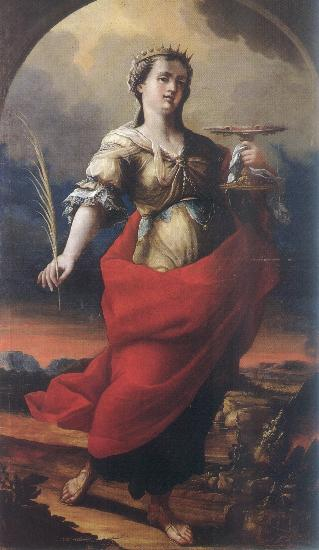
Saint Lucia

Evaristo Muñoz Estarlich (1684 in Valencia – 1737 in Valencia) was a Spanish Baroque painter; a follower of the decorative style introduced to Valencia by Antonio Palomino. Some sources give his year of birth as 1671.

== Biography ==
He studied with Juan Conchillos and, in addition to his artwork, was known as a dancer, theatrical performer and fencer.

He moved to Palma de Mallorca in 1709 to paint the communion chapel at the Convent of San Francisco and married a woman who said she was a widow of someone who had been taken captive in Algiers, which nullified their marriage. When the husband appeared, he had to return to Valencia, and served as a soldier along the way, although he continued to paint. Once again, he was offered marriage by a woman who said her husband had died in Sicily, but this time he was more cautious. He finally married María Teresa Llacer, a young woman who survived him by fifty years.

After that marriage, he settled permanently in Valencia, dedicating himself to painting and teaching, for which he maintained a private drawing school at his home. The well known artists who took classes at his school include Ignacio Vergara, Hipólito Rovira and Cristóbal Valero.

His works were numerous, although many have not survived. Those that have include depictions of "The Banquet of Wenceslaus of Luxembourg" and "The Martyrdom of St. John of Nepomuk", both on the walls in St. John's chapel at the Iglesia de San Juan de la Cruz, and "The Apparition of St. Augustine and St. Thomas Aquinas", in the collection of the Museo de Bellas Artes de Valencia

Four canvases depicting the childhood of Jesus, which were deposited at the Museum during the Confiscation, were restored in 2010 and have been attributed to him. They were originally believed to be the work of Luca Giordano.
