= José Marcelo Contreras =

Spanish painter and art professor

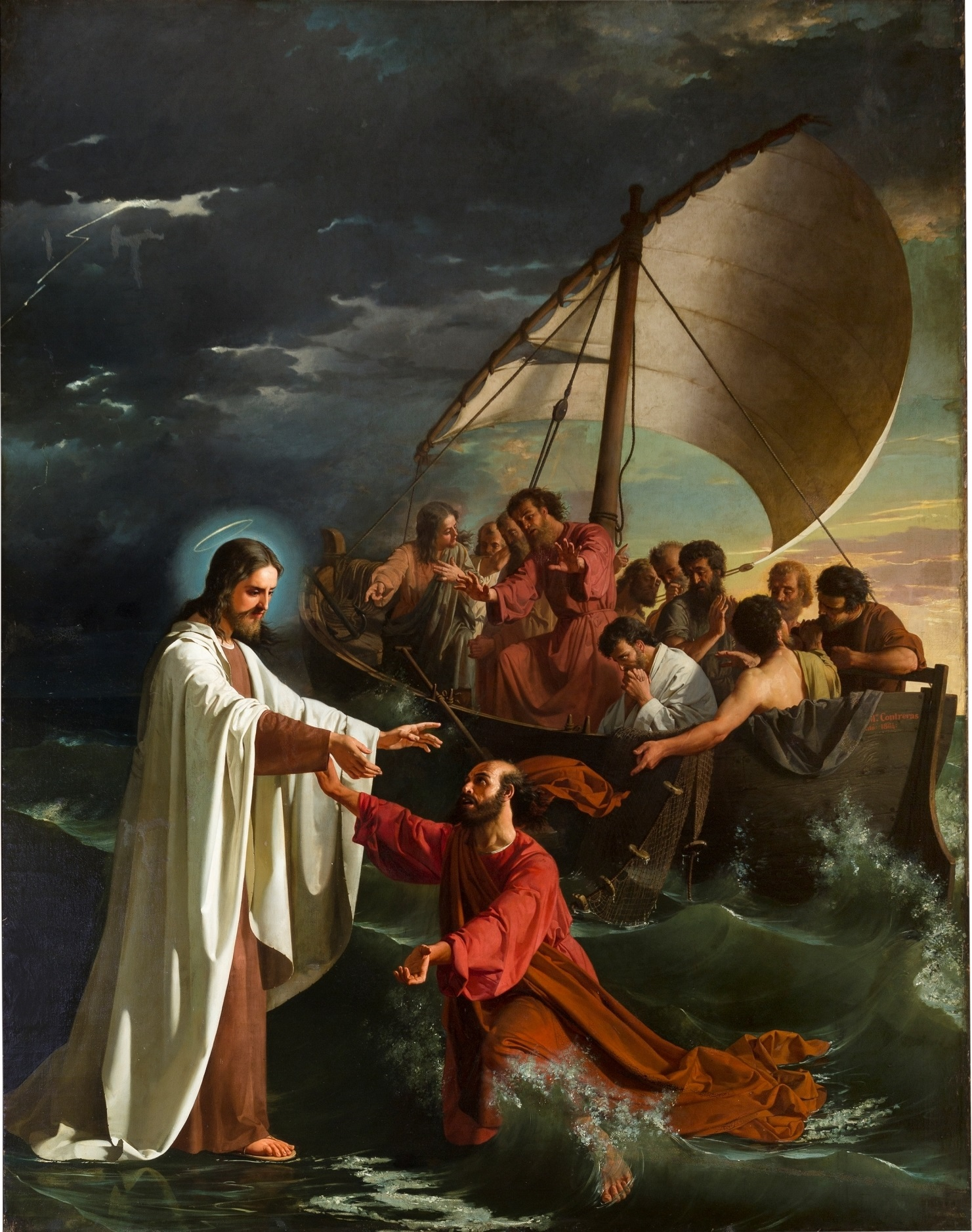
The Doubt of Saint Peter

José Marcelo Contreras y Muñoz (16 January 1827 – 1890/92) was a Spanish painter and art professor. Largely remembered as a painter of historical scenes, he also created portraits and genre works.

== Biography ==
He was born in Granada. His father, José Contreras Osorio (1794–1874), was an architect. Initially dedicated to a career in business, he displayed a talent for art and began his training at the Academy of Fine Arts in Granada. He then worked in the studios of Francisco Enríquez and Agapito López de San Román. Following his graduation in 1847, he transferred to the Real Academia de Bellas Artes de San Fernando in Madrid, where he studied with Federico de Madrazo and Juan Antonio Ribera.

In 1854, he moved to Córdoba, where he had been appointed Director of the provincial museum. He spent two years preparing a catalog of the museum's collection, then briefly returned to Granada to marry Francisca Vilches. Back in Córdoba, he began accepting commissions from the local nobility. In 1860, he applied for several open teaching positions.

After 1861, he devoted himself primarily to teaching, initially at the Escuela de Bellas Artes in Cádiz, then at a similar institution in Valencia. During this time, he also held his first successful showings. In 1864, he participated in the National Exhibition of Fine Arts, presenting The Doubt of Saint Peter, with which he won a second-class medal. It was later purchased by the Museo del Prado and, once again, he had clients among the nobility.

The following year, grieving the death of his wife, he and his children relocated to Madrid, where he was named a Professor at the Academia. There, he became a regular participant in the National Exhibition, and began doing decorative work; including the curtain at the Teatro Novedades, a ceiling at the Café de Madrid, the curtain and ceilings at the Teatro Lara, and various decorations at the Basilica of San Francisco el Grande. He was named a Commander in the Order of Isabel the Catholic.

Contreras died in Granada ca. 1890–1892.
