= Academia de Bellas Artes de Santa Bárbara =

Former art school in Valencia, Spain

The Academia de Bellas Artes de Santa Bárbara was an art school located in Valencia, Spain, founded in 1753 by decree of King Ferdinand VI of Spain.

The school which was located in the University of Valencia building was named after Barbara of Portugal. In consequence of underfunding, the institution was disbanded in 1759.

The current Real Academia de Bellas Artes de San Carlos de Valencia is deemed to be the follow-on institution of the Academia de Bellas Artes de Santa Bárbara.
