= Real Academia de Bellas Artes de San Carlos de Valencia =

Art school in Valencia, Spain

Coordinates: 39°26′42″N 0°23′22″W

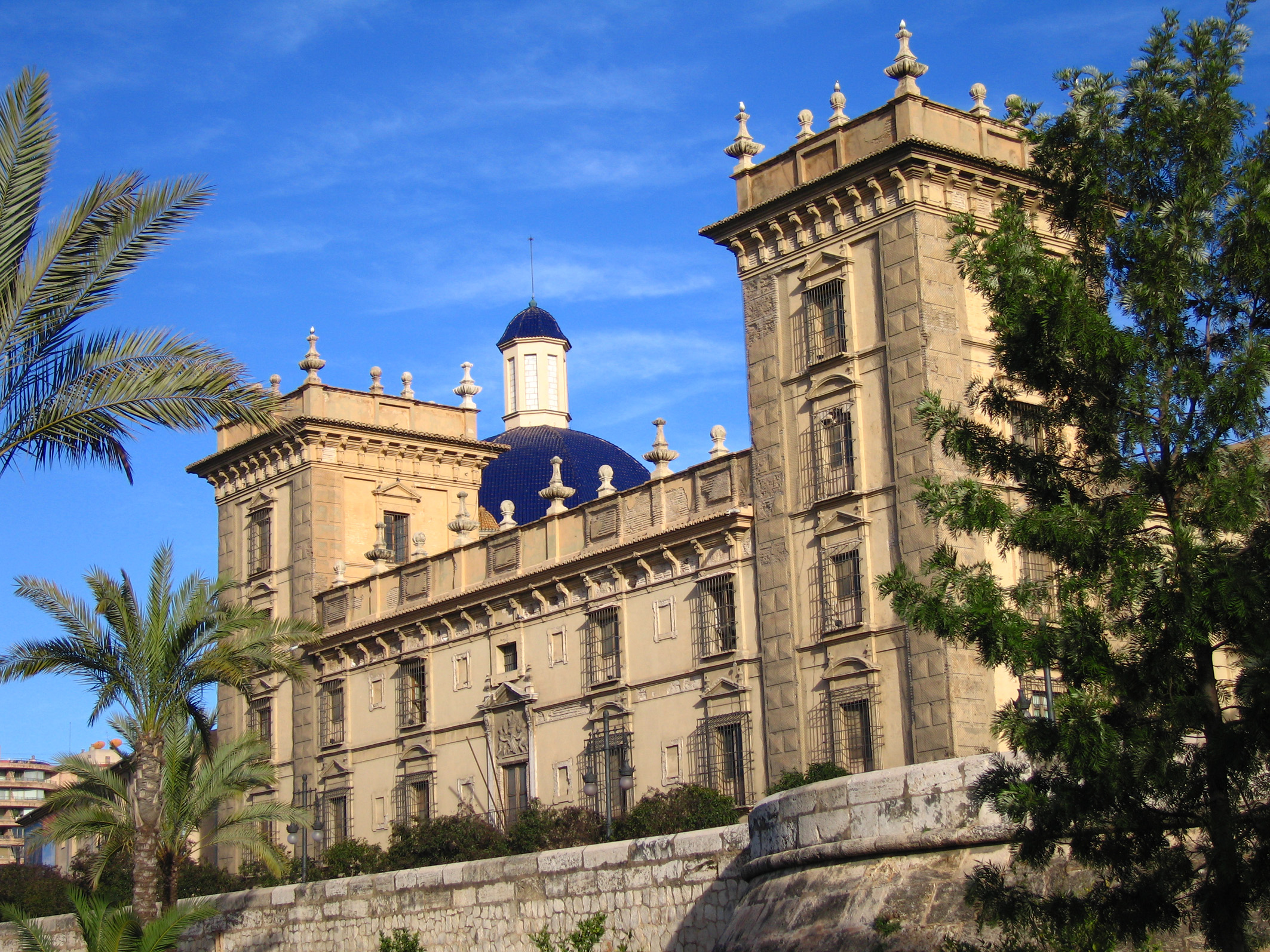
Museu de Belles Arts de València, headquarters of the Saint Charles Royal Academy of Fine Arts.

The Real Academia de Bellas Artes de San Carlos de Valencia (Spanish for Saint Charles Royal Academy of Fine Arts of Valencia) has been a Spanish Art school in Valencia since 1768.

== History ==
The institution is deemed to be the follow-on institution of the Academia de Bellas Artes de Santa Bárbara, which was closed in 1759.

The institution was founded under the name Real Academia de las Tres Nobles Artes de San Carlos (Royal Academy of the three Noble Arts of Saint Charles) by decret of Charles III from February 14, 1768, according to the Real Academia de Bellas Artes de San Fernando in Madrid. The so-called "three noble arts" were painting, sculpture and architecture. Until 1910 the academic training was rather practical, before the course offer was increased by essential theoretic and practical knowledge. By decret from July 24, 1913, the museum for painting and sculpture was subordinated to the academy.

The current president is Román de la Calle de la Calle.

== Faculties ==
- Architecture
- Sculpture
- Painting and printmaking
- Music

== Alumni ==
- Julio Benlloch (1893–1919)
- José Nicolau Huguet (1855–1909)
- Cecilio Plá (1860–1934)
- Enrique Simonet (1866–1927)
- Bernardo Ferrándiz Bádenes (1835–1885)
- Ignacio Pinazo Camarlench (1849–1916)
- Laura Pérez Granel (born 1983)
- María Teresa Oller (1920–2018)
- Jose Royo (1946–)
- Rigoberto Perez Soler (1896–1968)
- R. Mora (1909-)
