= European printmaking in the 18th century =

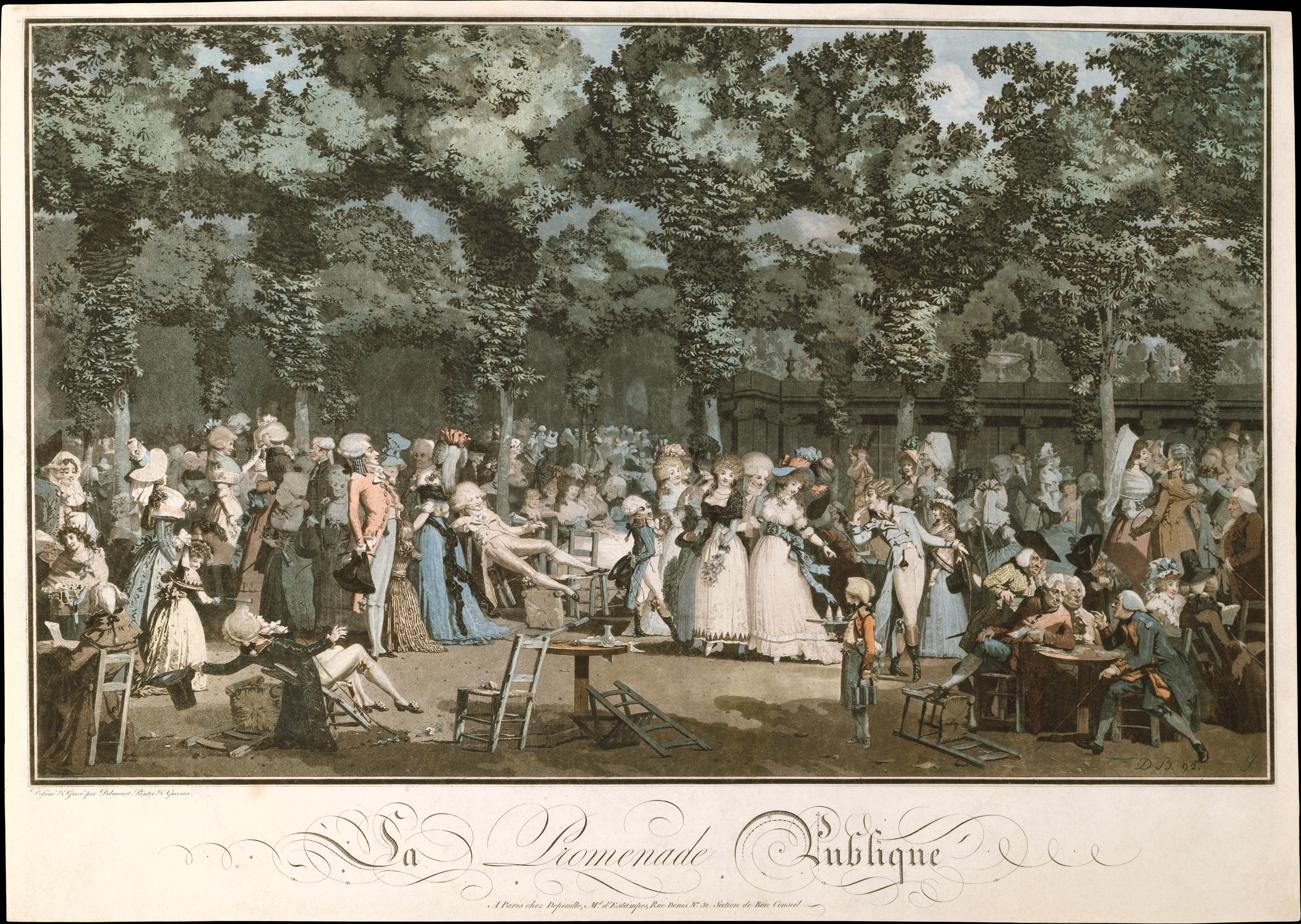
The Public Promenade (1792), by Philibert-Louis Debucourt, Metropolitan Museum of Art, New York.

European printmaking in the 18th century grew greatly in quantity, and generally had high levels of technical skill. But original artistic printmaking declined, with reproductive prints becoming the majority. Many printmakers mixed intaglio printing techniques on the same plates with great skill. The generally reduced level of artistic creativity in printmaking changed at the end of the century with the great print series of Goya, whose career stretched into the 1820s but is all covered here. Goya is usually taken as the end of the old master print era, to which the 18th century added relatively little.

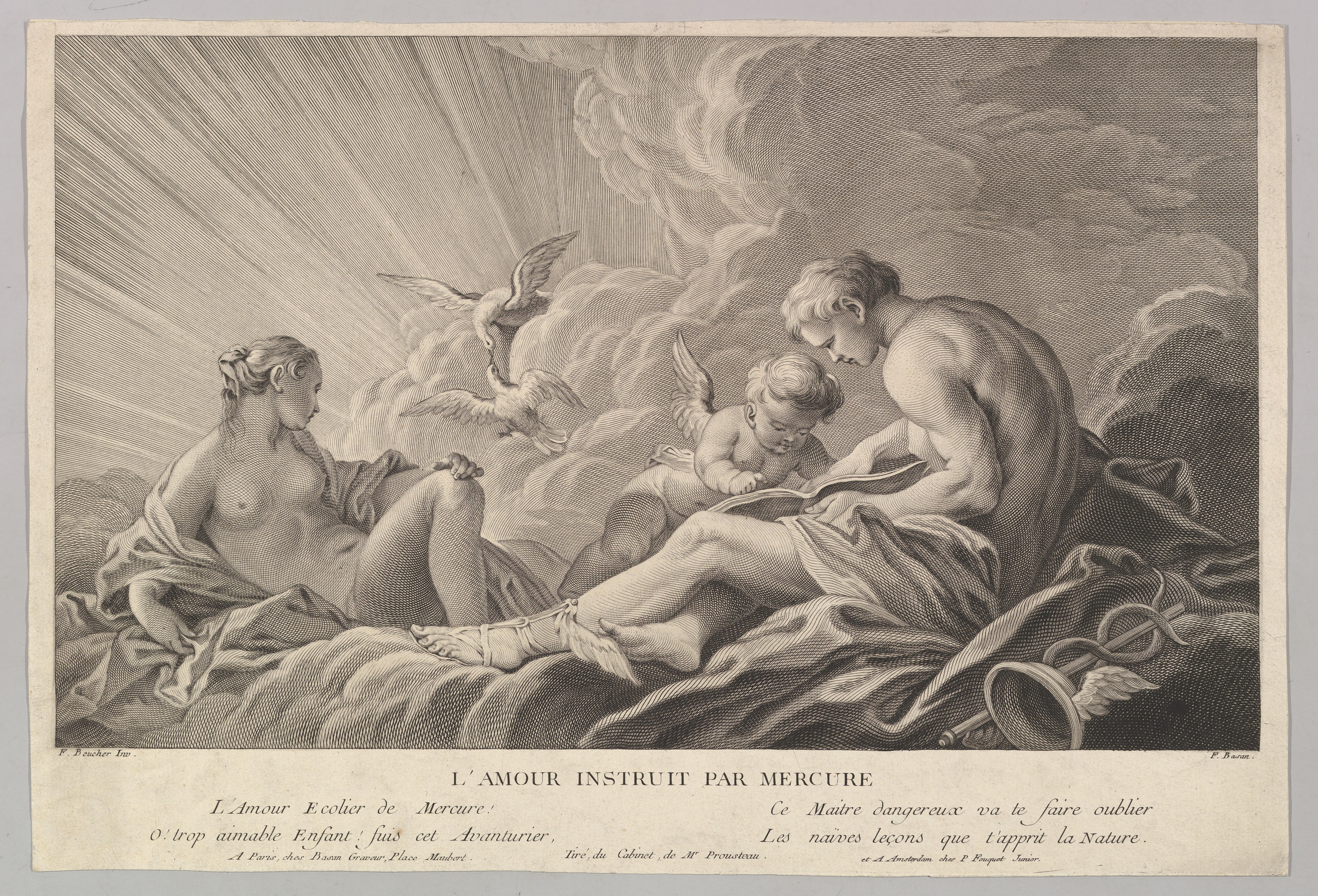
Cupid Instructed by Mercury, by François Boucher, Metropolitan Museum of Art, New York.

In this century the Baroque survived until almost the middle of the century—depending on the area—followed by Rococo and Neoclassicism, a movement that lasted until the beginning of the 19th century. The Rococo developed approximately between 1730 and 1770, and involved the survival of the main artistic manifestations of the Baroque, with a more emphasized sense of decoration and ornamental taste, which were taken to a paroxysm of richness, sophistication and elegance. The progressive social rise of the bourgeoisie and scientific advances, as well as the cultural environment of the Enlightenment, led to the abandonment of religious themes in favor of new themes and more worldly attitudes, in which luxury and ostentation stood out as new factors of social prestige.

Neoclassicism, on the other hand, can be framed between approximately 1760 and 1830. During this period, and especially after the French Revolution, the rise of the bourgeoisie favored the resurgence of classical forms, more pure and austere, as opposed to the ornamental excesses of the Baroque and Rococo, identified with the aristocracy. This atmosphere of appreciation of the classical Greco-Roman legacy was influenced by the archaeological discovery of Pompeii and Herculaneum, together with the dissemination of an ideology of perfection of classical forms by Johann Joachim Winckelmann, who postulated that in ancient Greece there was perfect beauty, which generated a myth about the perfection of classical beauty that still conditions the perception of art today.

During this period, prints reached high levels of technical perfection, requiring more and more apprenticeship and professionalization, which meant that most of the works were by printmakers by trade and not by the artists themselves, who combined this technique with painting. Likewise, engravers limited themselves to transcribing artists' compositions and rarely made their own compositions, except in a few cases such as Jean-Michel Moreau and Philibert-Louis Debucourt. Nevertheless, some artists did produce their own engravings, especially etchings, such as Jean-Antoine Watteau, Jean-Honoré Fragonard and Gabriel de Saint-Aubin.

At the end of the century, lithography appeared, a new type of printmaking with wax on limestone plates, invented by Alois Senefelder in 1796. It was used by painters such as Goya, Gainsborough and Géricault. Because of its ease of printing and low cost, lithography was widely used in the journalistic medium until the appearance of photomechanical techniques. On the other hand, the printing of large series of prints became popular, usually collected in books, usually on subjects such as landscapes and views (Marco Ricci, Canaletto), satires of manners (William Hogarth, Thomas Rowlandson) or whims and fantasies (Giovanni Battista and Giovanni Domenico Tiepolo, Giovanni Battista Piranesi).

== France ==
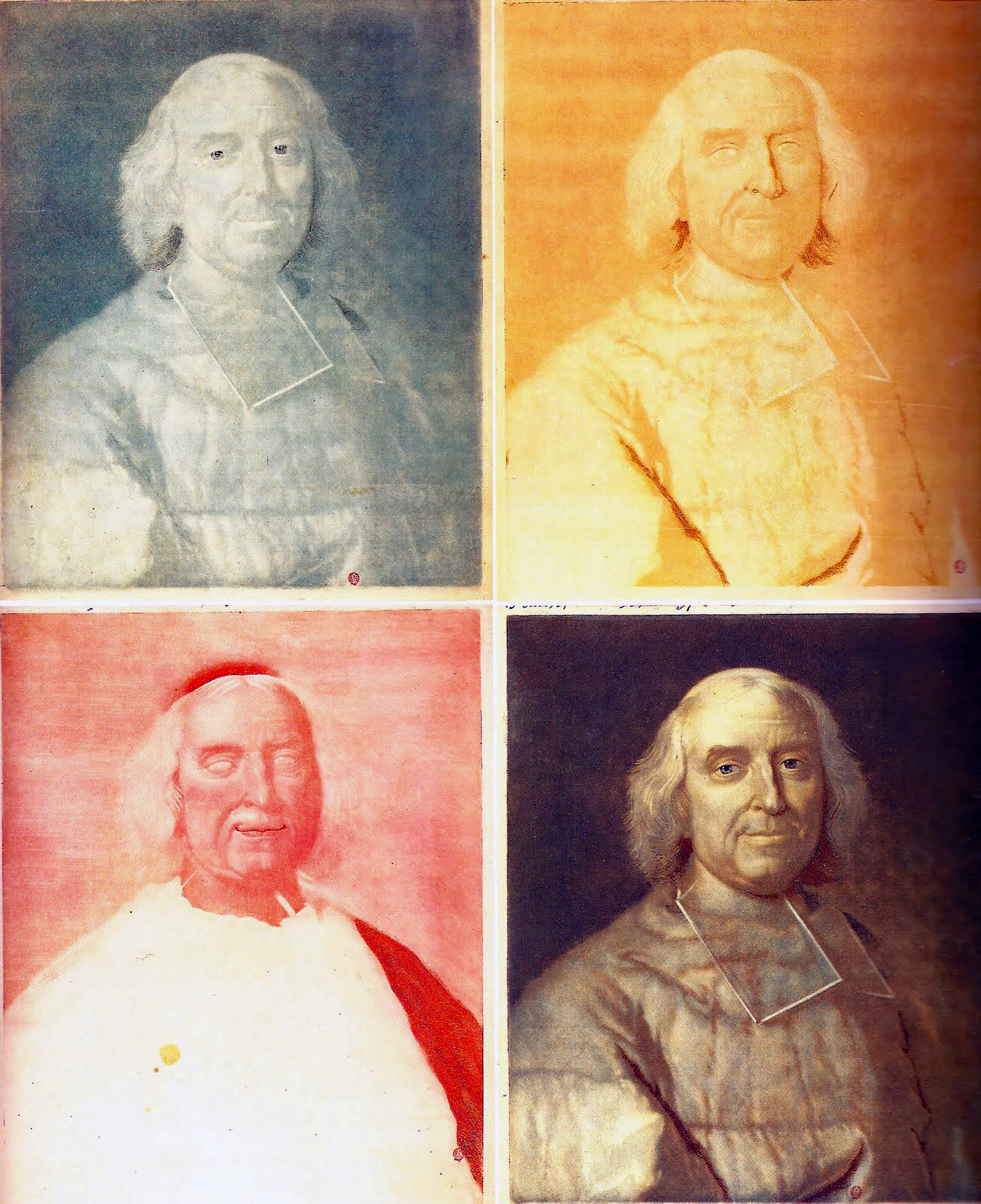
Portrait of Cardinal André-Hercule de Fleury (1738), by Jacob Christoph Le Blon on an original by Hyacinthe Rigaud, Bibliothèque Nationale de France, Paris. Four intermediate states or proofs (C, Y, M, B) for a color print.

Rococo emerged in France, where printmaking experienced a golden age in this century. New techniques were tried out at this time: in 1704, Jacob Christoph Le Blon experimented with color printing combined with half inks; Jean-Charles François combined soft varnish and roller in what he called "pencil style engraving", and tried a brush etching technique close to aquatint, a method perfected by Jean-Baptiste Le Prince. In the transition between the 17th and 18th centuries, the work of Claude Gillot stood out, the architect of the change of taste in illustration for an ornamental and ornate style, applied to books as well as ex-libris, labels, business cards, menus, invitations, etc. Two outstanding Rococo painters were also dedicated to printmaking, Jean-Antoine Watteau and François Boucher. The first was the initiator of the fête galante ("gallant party"), a genre characterized by the representation of court scenes set in bucolic landscapes, in which he produced works such as Figures of fashions and French and comic figures, helped by printmakers such as François Joullain, Louis Desplaces and Henri Simon Thomassin. Boucher, perhaps the best watercolorist of the first half of the 18th century in his country, devoted himself mainly to the reproduction of Watteau's work, with a series of 125 etchings using the pencil engraving method. Other interpreters of Watteau's work were Laurent Cars and Anne Claude de Caylus. The work of two of Gérard Audran's nephews, Jean Audran and Benoît Audran the Elder, of skillful precision and technical perfection, should also be mentioned in this period. Printmaking was sometimes practiced as a hobby by members of royalty, such as Queen Marie Leczinska of France(wife of Louis XV) —who engraved some of Nattier and Oudry's works which she later distributed to friends using her own printing press —Philippe II of Orleans—who illustrated in 1718 the novel Daphnis and Cloe—or the Duchess of Luynes. In the second half of the century, the work of Jean-Honoré Fragonard stood out, still in rococo style, author of court scenes in leafy landscapes. Pierre-Philippe Choffard was a renowned draughtsman and watercolorist, author of the Notice sur l'art de la gravure en France. In the last decades, the work of Jean-Michel Moreau, Charles-Nicolas Cochin, Augustin de Saint-Aubin and Charles-Clément Balvay was already close to Neoclassicism. During the French Revolution, the series of two hundred prints of Historical Pictures of the French Revolution (1791), by Jean Duplessis-Bertaux, is worth mentioning.

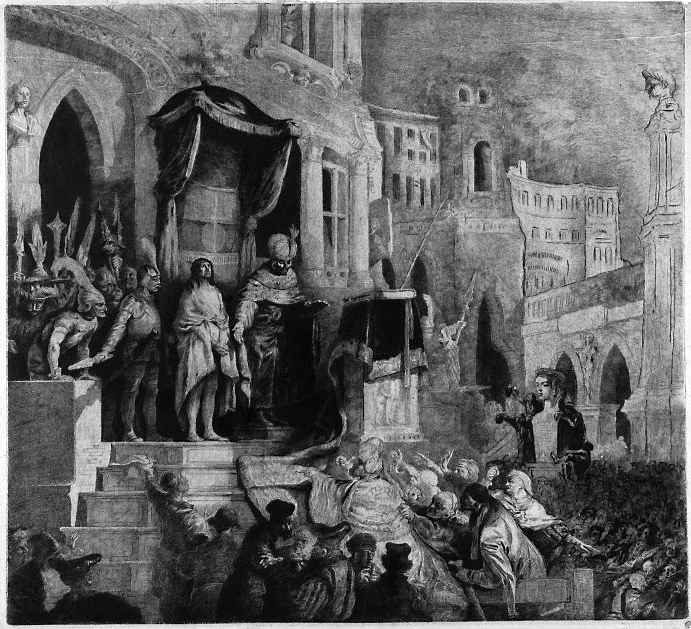
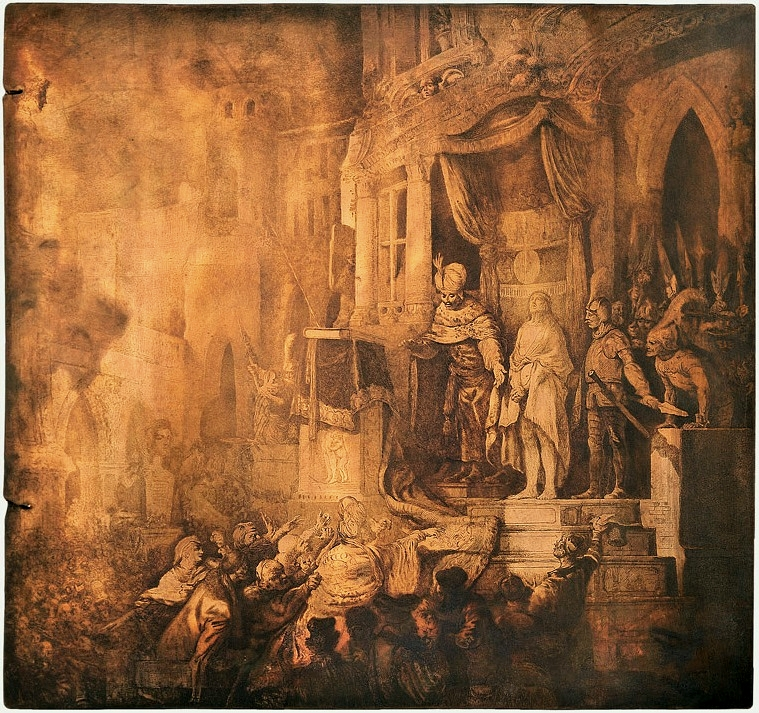
Ecce Homo (1774-1789), by Jean-Pierre Norblin de La Gourdaine, original print (left) and copper plate (right) with inverted composition, National Museum, Warsaw

The next generation, between the 18th and 19th centuries, is that of the neoclassicists: Jacques-Louis David, considered the father of French Neoclassicism, a painter of historical paintings in a sober style, produced some etchings with a caricatured tone (English Government, 1793–1794; The Army of Jars, 1793–1794); Pierre-Paul Prud'hon, who sporadically practiced printmaking, in intaglio (Phrosine et Mélidor) or lithography (A Reading, The Unfortunate Family); Anne-Louis Girodet-Trioson illustrated books by Virgil, Anacreontea, Racine and other writers, which were published by the Didot brothers, a task in which François Gérard was also involved; Pierre-Narcisse Guérin was commissioned by the French government to prepare a report on the new method of lithography, for which he produced several essays, such as The Sloth and the Vigilante.

== Italy ==
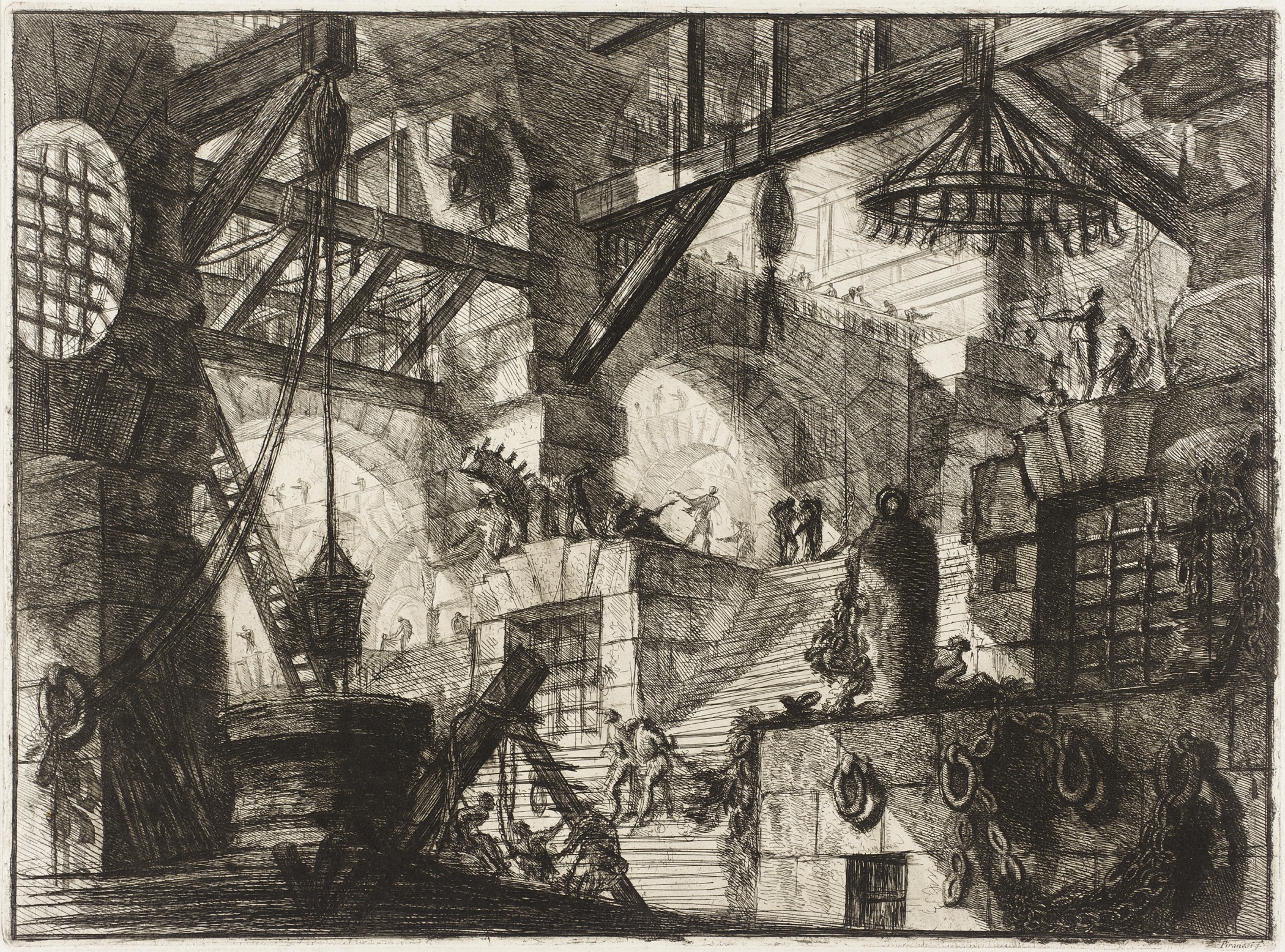
Image from the series Prisons of Invention (1761), by Giovanni Battista Piranesi, Los Angeles County Museum of Art.

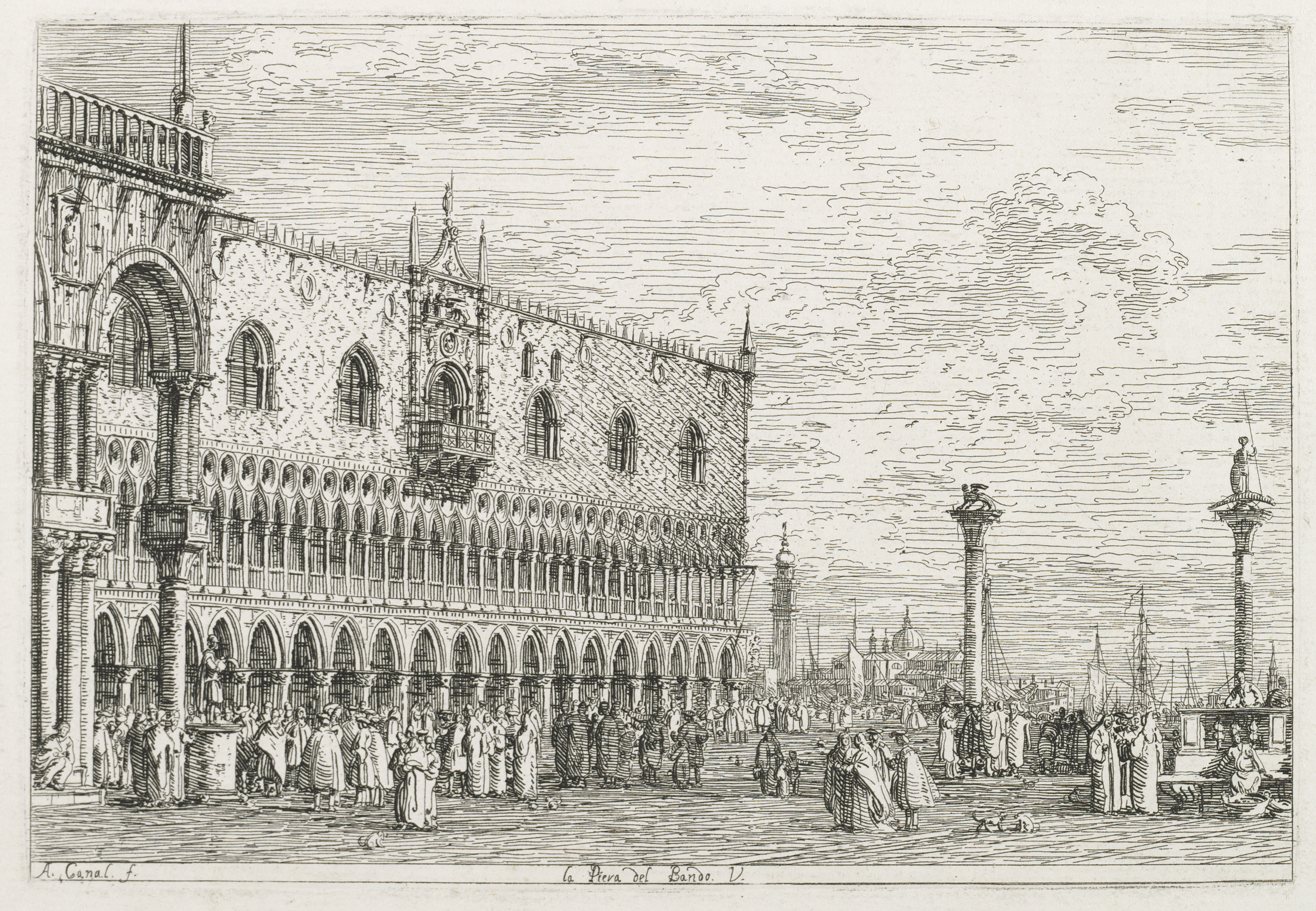
The Stone of Proclamation at Venice (c. 1735–1746), by Canaletto, Cleveland Museum of Art.

In Italy, the Venetian school of etchers, whose specialty was the vedute, the views of Venice, stands out. Its two main representatives were Canaletto and Giovanni Battista Tiepolo. The former produced luminous views of his city, generally with small groups of people and broad perspectives of Venetian palaces and canals. Tiepolo had a great creative fantasy, in images of bold composition in which the liveliness of the movements and a dazzling luminosity stand out (Capricci, Scherzi di fantasia). His sons and disciples Giovanni Domenico and Lorenzo Tiepolo followed in his footsteps. Also worth mentioning in Venice were Luca Carlevarijs, Michele Marieschi and Giovanni Marco Pitteri. In Rome, the work of Giovanni Battista Piranesi, Venetian by origin, author of the famous series of prints of Roman views (Views of Rome, Magnificence of Roman architecture), as well as the great inventiveness of the Imaginary Prisons.

Giovanni Volpato, reproduced works by Raphael, Claude Lorrain and Anton Raphael Mengs. His disciple, Raffaello Sanzio Morghen was a great engraver of exquisite workmanship.

== Germany ==
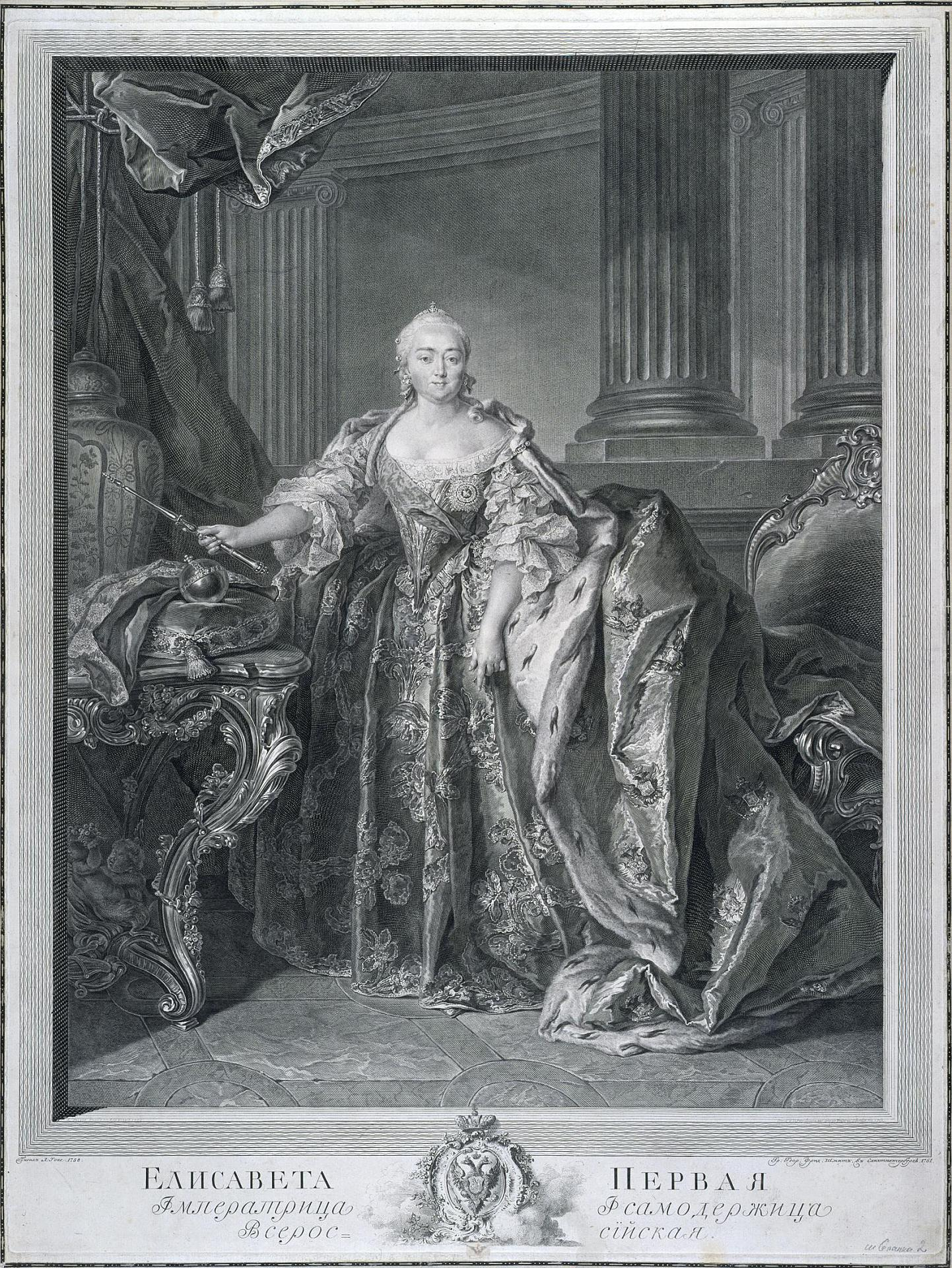
Empress Elizabeth of Russia (1761), by Georg Friedrich Schmidt, Hermitage Museum, St. Petersburg.

In Germany, Johann Elias Ridinger specialized in images of animals and hunting scenes; Bernhard Rode was a watercolorist influenced by Rubens and Rembrandt; Daniel Chodowiecki decorated books and almanacs with skillful compositional sense, such as Miguel de Cervantes' Don Quixote, Ariosto's Orlando Furioso and Goethe's Werther; Johann Georg Wille and Georg Friedrich Schmidt expatriated to France, where they excelled as portraitists; and Adam von Bartsch was the author of the Peintre-graveur, a catalog of the most famous prints by Flemish, Dutch, German and Italian masters.

== Netherlands ==
In the Netherlands, printmaking declined notably during this century, after the heights of great quality reached in the previous century. Jacobus Houbraken and Cornelis Ploos van Amstel deserve to be mentioned. The former worked mainly with the burin, and specialized in portraits, especially biographies of illustrious figures of his time. Ploos van Amstel was dedicated to the reproduction of works by Nicolaes Berchem, Adriaen van de Velde and Adriaen Brouwer.

== Britain ==
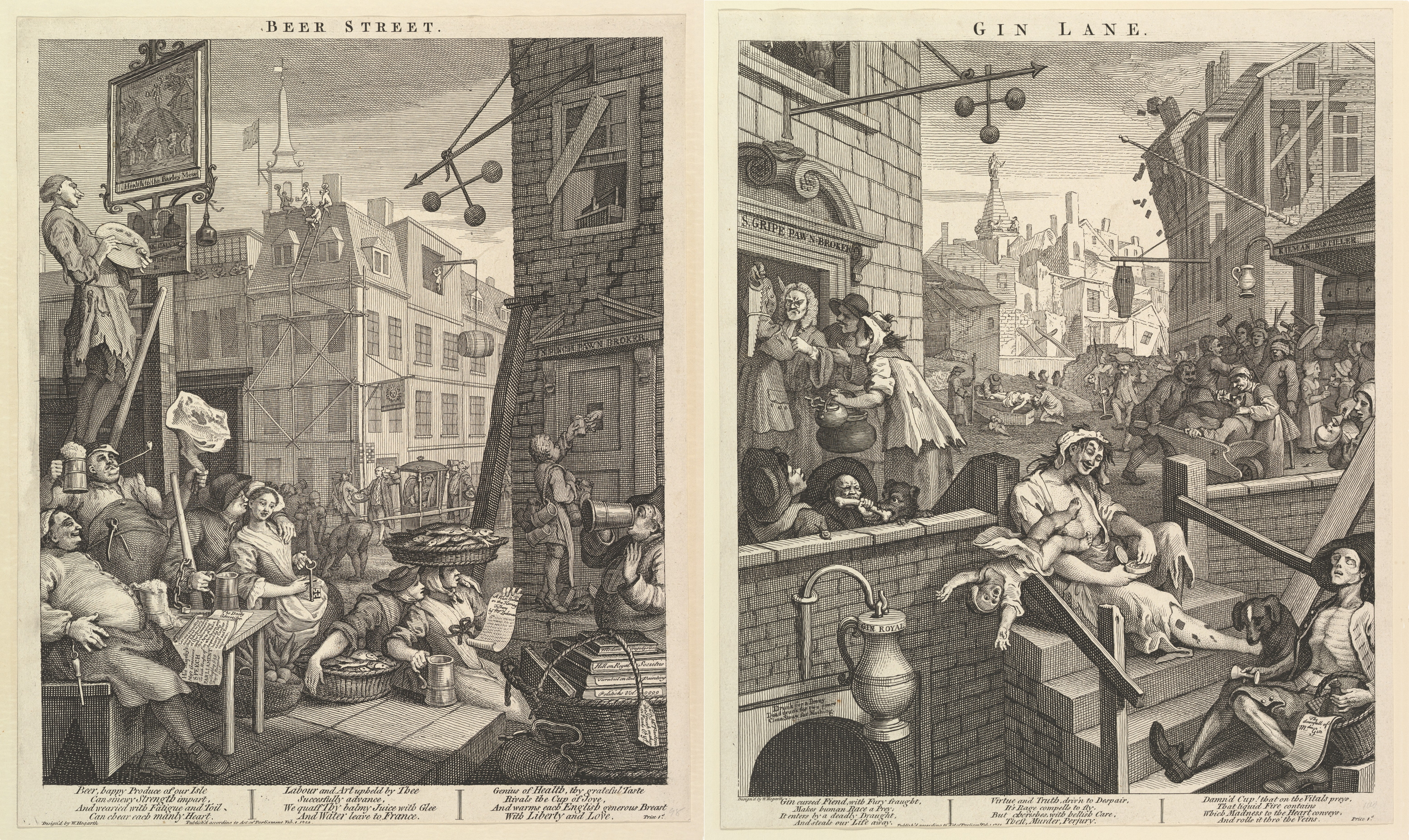
Beer Street and Gin Lane (1751), by William Hogarth.

In Great Britain, the Italian Francesco Bartolozzi introduced dot engraving (also called "crayon") and formed a school of engravers including John Keyse Sherwin, John Raphael Smith and Caroline Watson; he also worked occasionally with Angelica Kauffmann. Thomas Bewick introduced the new wood engraving technique by cutting the wood across the grain, and printing in intaglio; an ornithologist by profession, he produced bird prints of great quality (British Birds, 1797–1804).

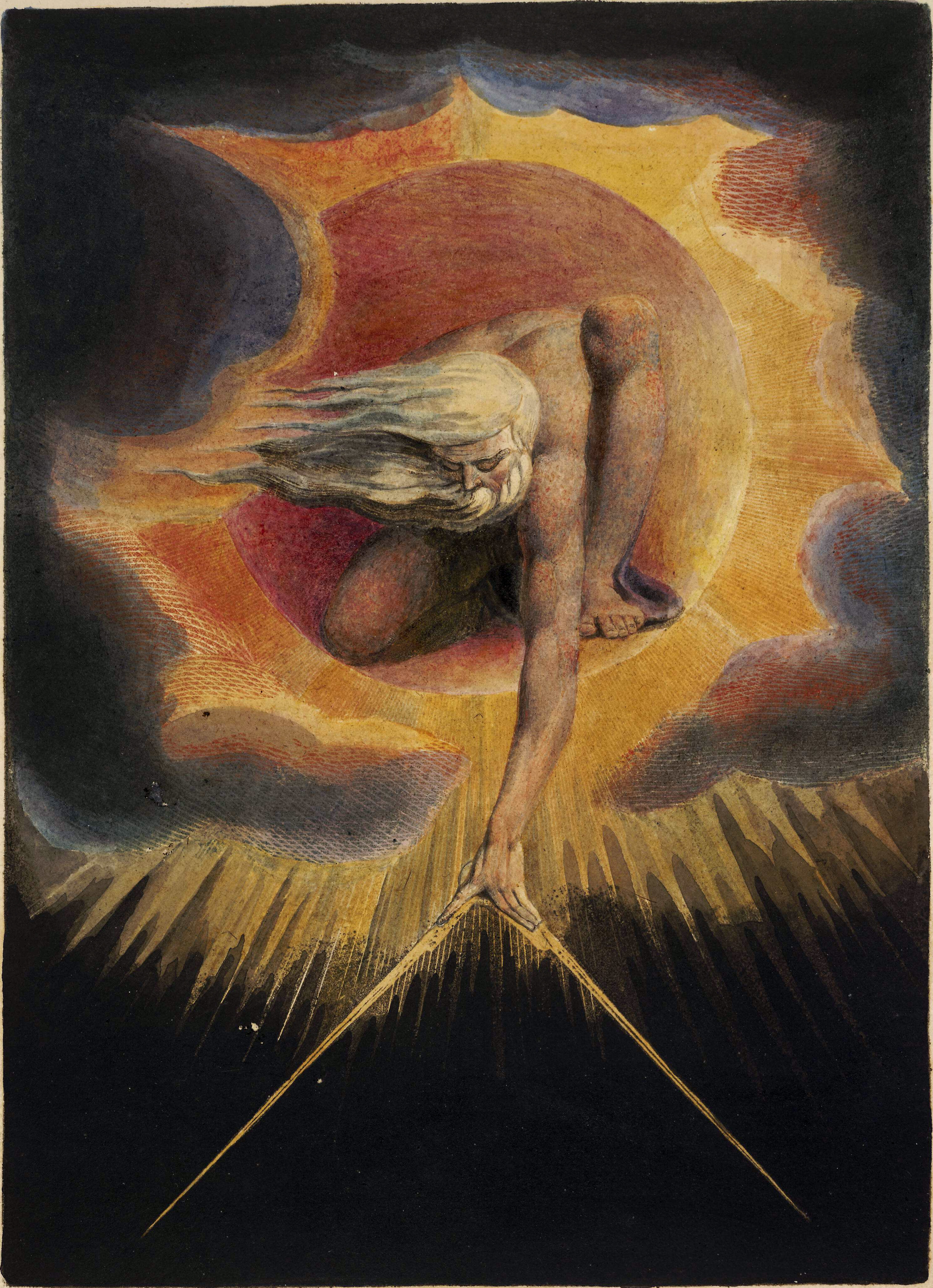
The Ancient of Days, illustration from Europe a Prophecy (1794), by William Blake, British Museum, London.

William Woollett, a skilled engraver and aquaprinter, made reproductions of the works of Claude Lorrain and especially Richard Wilson. The Frenchman Simon François Ravenet was an outstanding portraitist. The painter Thomas Gainsborough etched a few landscapes with careful attention to detail. Another painter, William Hogarth, was one of the most outstanding printmakers of his time, though not making the plates himself. He produced genre scenes of satirical and moralistic tone, in series such as The Four Stages of Cruelty, The Four Times of the Day, Industry and Idleness and Fashionable Marriage. Thomas Rowlandson, author of the series Human Miseries, had the same satirical-moralizing tone, as did James Gillray, a famous caricaturist. It is also worth mentioning the editorial work of John Boydell, creator of the Boydell Shakespeare Gallery, in charge of the production of prints of scenes from the plays of William Shakespeare. He also promoted the engraving of the series of drawings of the Liber Veritatis of Claude Lorrain by Richard Earlom.

== Spain before Goya ==
In Spain, printmaking declined in this century due to the lack of official protection—as it happened in other countries—and its abandonment to private initiative, although at the end of the century it gave the exceptional figure of Goya. As in previous centuries, it was mainly linked to editorial work, together with a small number of original prints and reproductions of paintings by the best painters. The favorite technique continued to be etching. In the publishing field, it is worth mentioning: Matías de Irala, author of 41 plates for the Sacred and Divine Geroglyphs of Luis de Solís y Villaluz (1734) and the illustrations of The Adventures of Telemachus by Fénelon (1758); Miquel Sorelló made in Italy several plates of the paintings of Herculaneum, published in Naples between 1757 and 1761. In the field of reproduction and original creation, Carlos Casanova, painter and engraver to Ferdinand VI, made a Portrait of the monarch, the San Agustín by Sebastián Herrera Barnuevo and the plates of the Journey by Jorge Juan and Antonio de Ulloa; his son Francisco Casanova made religious images; Juan Bautista Ravanals was the author of a Portrait of Felipe V (1703); Antonio Carnicero was a creator of religious images, especially of Marian invocations; and Simón Brieva made portraits, such as the portrait of Columbus, as well as architectural plates. Some painters also practiced printmaking, such as Francisco and Ramón Bayeu, Mariano Salvador Maella, Luis Paret, José Camarón Boronat, José Antonio Ximeno y Carrera and Francesc Tramulles. Charles III practiced engraving as a hobby, and his Virgen con el Niño Jesús en brazos is noteworthy.

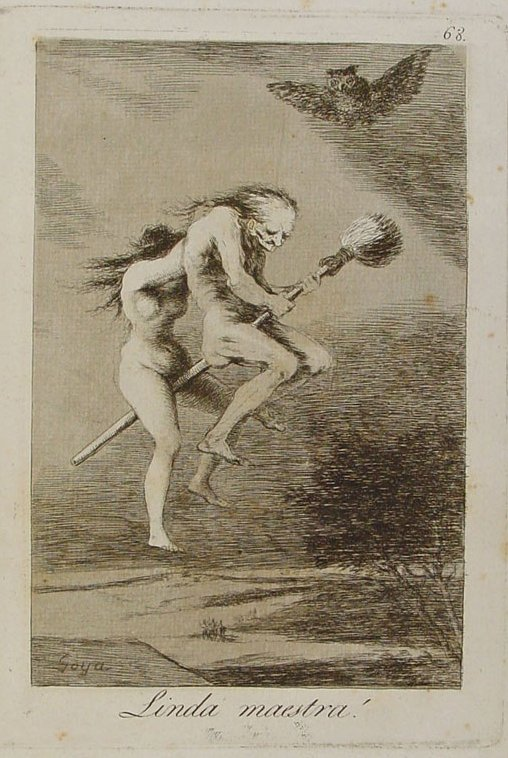
Capricho No. 68: Linda maestra! (1799), by Francisco Goya.

During this century there were two institutions that promoted the teaching and dissemination of printmaking: the Real Academia de Bellas Artes de San Fernando in Madrid and the Board of Trade of Barcelona. In the former, the work of Juan Bernabé Palomino, chamber engraver to Ferdinand VI and director of Engraving at the academy, author of portraits such as those of Louis XV, Marie Anne de Bourbon, Elisabeth Farnese, Juan de Palafox and José Cervi, as well as the illustration of the Museo Pictórico by his uncle Antonio Palomino, was outstanding. He was the teacher of engravers such as Nicolás Carrasco, Jerónimo Antonio Gil, Antonio Espinosa de los Monteros, Juan Minguet, Juan Barcelón and Charles Joseph Flipart. He was also director of the Tomás Francisco Prieto Academy, who was the engraver of the Royal Mint, author of the portraits of Ferdinand VI and Bárbara de Braganza. Another distinguished professor of the academy was Manuel Salvador Carmona, author of portraits and reproductions in etching and engraving, among which the Portrait of Ferdinand VI and reproductions of works by Van Loo, Greuze, Murillo, Mengs and Velázquez stand out. His disciples were: his brother Juan Antonio Salvador Carmona, Fernando Selma, Rafael Esteve, Tomás López Enguídanos, Francisco Muntaner, José Gómez de Navia, Manuel Alegre and Luis Fernández Noseret. In the costumbrista genre, Juan de la Cruz Cano y Olmedilla, in a more neoclassical style, and Miguel Gamborino, with a pre-Romantic tone, are worth mentioning. In Barcelona, the Board of Trade created a series of scholarships for the training of engravers and, in 1775, promoted the creation of the Escola de la Llotja. Pasqual Pere Moles and Blas Ametller stood out among the Board's boarders. The former practiced etching and sweet carving, generally in reproductions of French artists of the time. Ametller made portraits and reproductions of Velázquez, Ribera, Murillo and French and Italian artists. Other scholarship holders were Esteban Boix and Francesc Fontanals. In 1789 the Real Calcografía—later Calcografía Nacional—was founded in Madrid, promoted by the Count of Floridablanca; its first director was Nicolás Barsanti.

== Early Romantics ==
Between the 18th and 19th centuries, and close to a certain pre-Romanticism, the work of Johann Heinrich Füssli and William Blake should be highlighted. Of Swiss origin, Füssli's work brings together currents that come from the classicist and mannerist traditions with others that are specific to English and Nordic painting, and that reflect a conception of the sublime that is manifested in English art and literature of the 18th century. Between 1755 and 1757 he illustrated the Till Eulenspiegel in a style between mannerism and baroque, influenced by Dürer, which combined both expressiveness and realism. He later illustrated works by Dante, Shakespeare, Milton, and Thomas Gray, and worked occasionally for John Boydell. Blake was an original writer and artist, difficult to classify, who devoted himself especially to illustration, in the manner of the ancient codex illuminators. He trained for seven years with the engraver James Basire, in whose workshop he acquired a taste for the Gothic style. From this training he owes the precision in the execution of his works, which contrasted with the prevailing pictorial style of the time. His work focused on allegorical figures of literary inspiration, especially from Shakespeare, Dante, Milton and the Bible, as well as his own writings. His first works were the illustration of his poetry books Songs of Innocence (1789) and Songs of Experience (1794), in hand-colored relief etching, with a simple, linear stylistic style, reminiscent of medieval times. Then followed works such as the Creation of Adam, Nebuchadnezzar, Pietà and the House of Death, where he shows the influence of Füssli and Michelangelo, and which stand out for their intense coloring. Between 1804 and 1820 he wrote and illustrated Jerusalem, his most ambitious work. In 1824 he began to illustrate the Divine Comedy, which he left unfinished.

== Goya ==
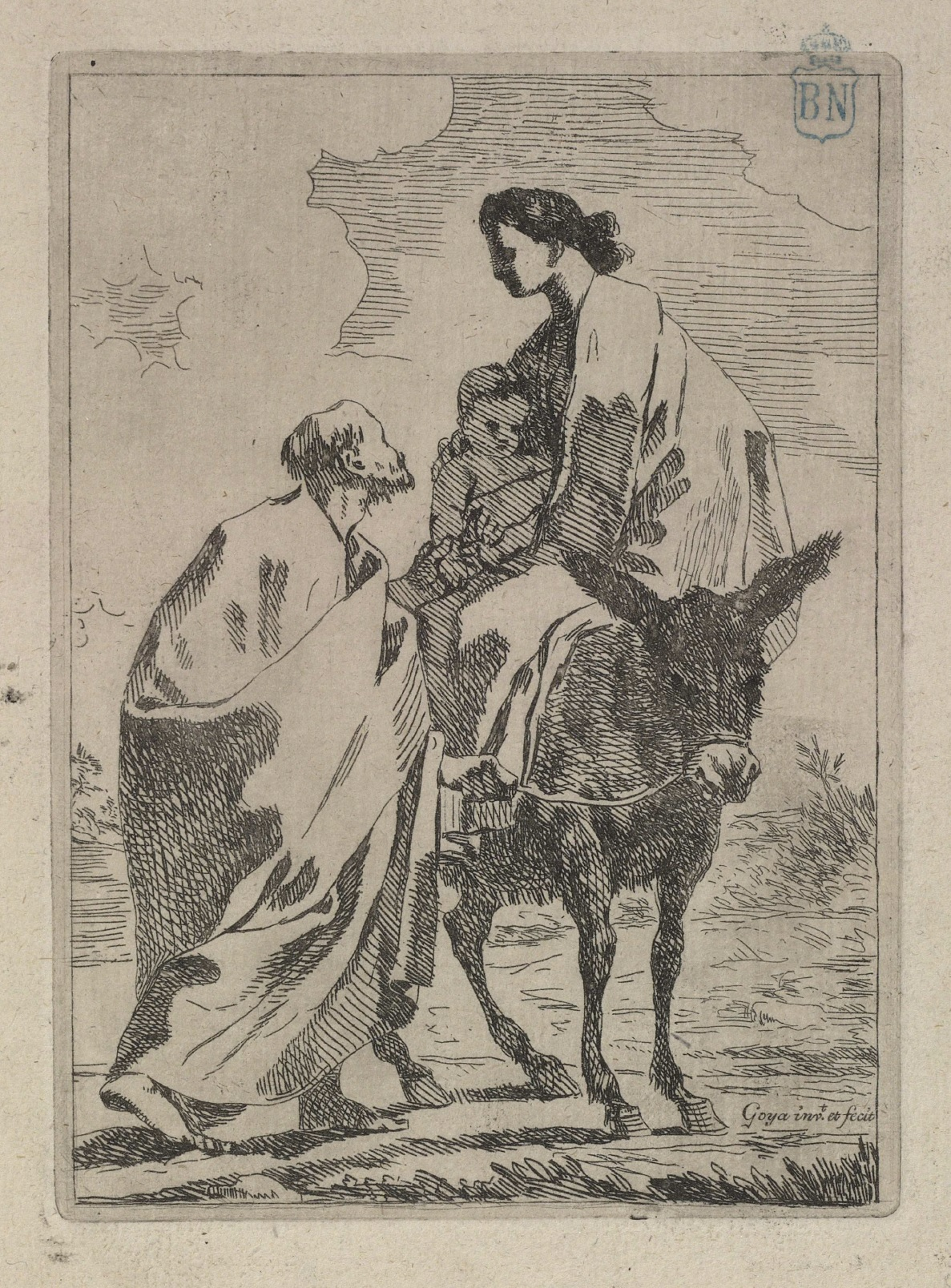
Flight into Egypt (1771), first print by Goya.

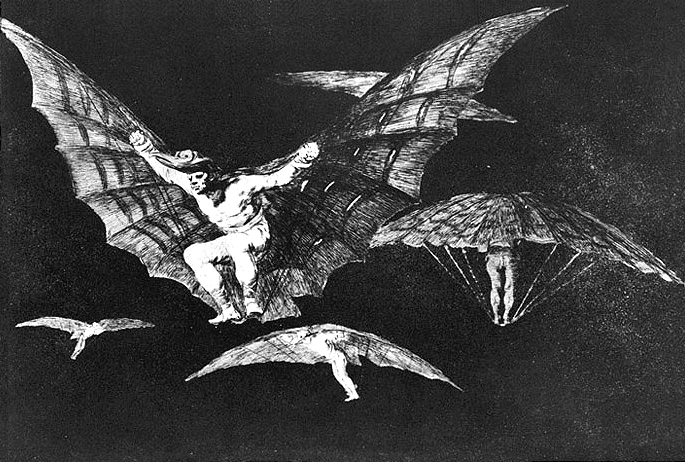
Disparate No. 13: A way of flying (1815–1824), by Francisco Goya.

In the transition between the 18th and 19th centuries, one of the most outstanding artists was Francisco Goya, who evolved from a style close to rococo to a certain pre-romanticism, but with a personal and expressive work with a strong intimate tone. He practiced etching, aquatint, mezzotint and, from the age of 73, lithography. His first known print was a Flight into Egypt, an etching of 1771. Among his earliest works is a series of reproductions of works by Velázquez, of which sixteen copperplates are known, which he showed in January 1779 to the royal family.

However, most of his prints correspond to his mature stage, marked by an illness that left him deaf in 1792. His character became more sour and sullen, which is evident in his graphic production, which surely served as an escape valve to express his deepest feelings. Thus arose the first of his great series of prints, Los caprichos, published in 1799. They are eighty etchings in mixed technique of etching and aquatint, with drypoint retouches. The images, as the title indicates, are personal fantasies of the artist, in which there is, however, a good dose of social criticism, of "censorship of human errors and vices", as he expressed in an advertisement he published in the press. He opened the series with a self-portrait, in which he shows himself as a self-confident man with a critical eye. One of the most relevant prints is No. 43, The Sleep of Reason Produces Monsters, in which a sleeping man—probably the artist—dreams of a series of monstrous animals that appear behind him, a metaphor of the excessive confidence in reason in the Enlightenment era.

The following series are marked by the War of Independence against the French occupation. The first was Los prisioneros (c. 1810–1815), three etchings with images of prisoners in chains, as a critique of the excesses and arbitrariness of justice. This was followed by The Disasters of War (1810–1815), a series of eighty-two etchings—with some drypoint, burnisher and gouache—which denounce the horrors of war in an impartial manner, without taking sides for Spanish or French, for the artist they are all victims of barbarism—the only mythologizing is practiced in the figure of Agustina de Aragón. Next come Los disparates (1815–1824, not published until 1864 under the name of Los Proverbios), twenty-two etchings in etching and aquatint with drypoint and burnisher retouches, in which he developed a cycle of images difficult to classify, without thematic link, ranging from dreamlike visions to images of violence and sex; in some of them there is criticism of the established power and the Ancien Régime. In these images he emphasized chiaroscuro more than ever, with great effects of tenebrism and the use of close-ups.

The last series of prints were dedicated to one of his hobbies: bullfighting. In La Tauromaquia (1816) he made thirty-three prints—eight were not published initially because they contained small defects—in which he showed various suertes of bullfighting. During his exile in Bordeaux—already seventy-eight years old—he produced The Bulls of Bordeaux (1824–1825), four lithographs in which, as opposed to the professional bullfighting of the previous series, he portrays bullfights and popular festivities. Despite his age, he worked hard to learn a new technique, which he managed to make the most of, with a torn, scratched style, with zigzagging stripes, handling the lithographic pencils as if they were brushes.

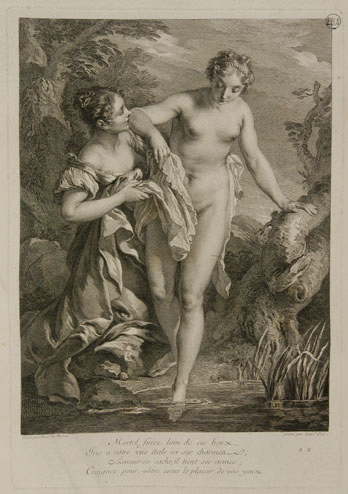
Iris in the bath (1731), by Laurent Cars.

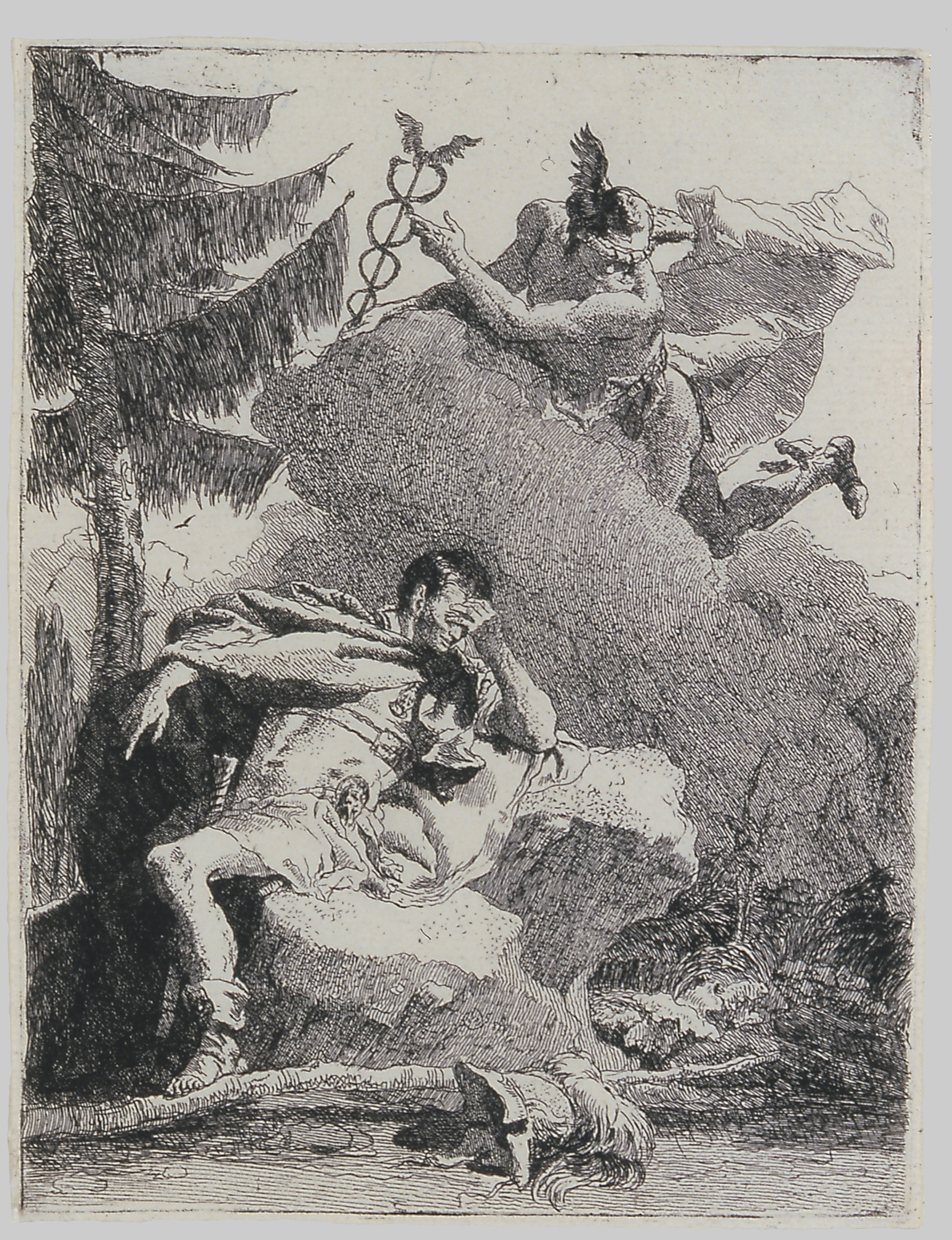
Mercury Appears to Aeneas in a Dream (1757), by Giovanni Battista Tiepolo, Metropolitan Museum of Art, New York.

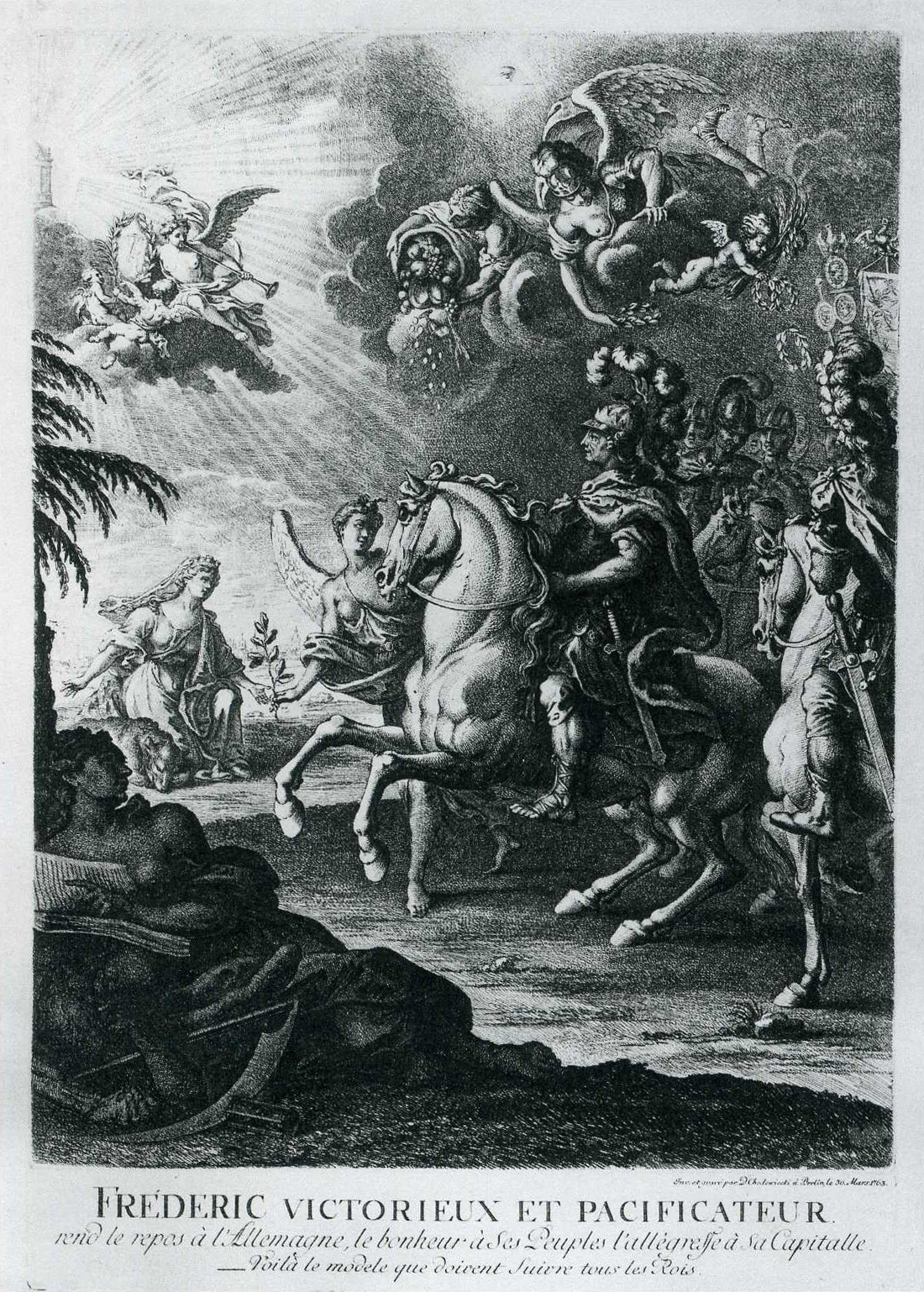
Peace Brings Back the King (1763), by Daniel Chodowiecki, Berlin State Museums.

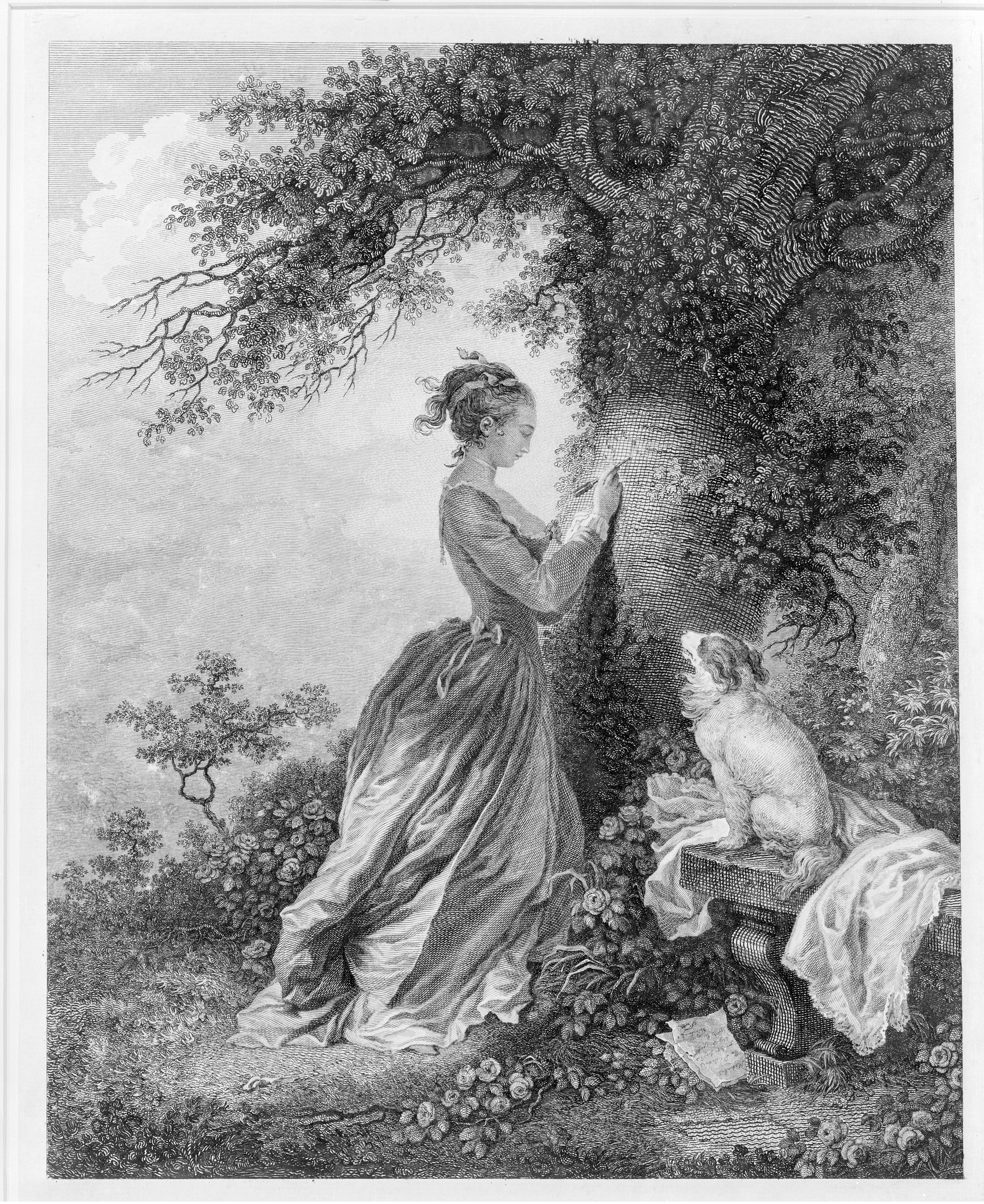
Le Chiffre d'Amour (c. 1770), by Jean-Honoré Fragonard, Metropolitan Museum of Art, New York.

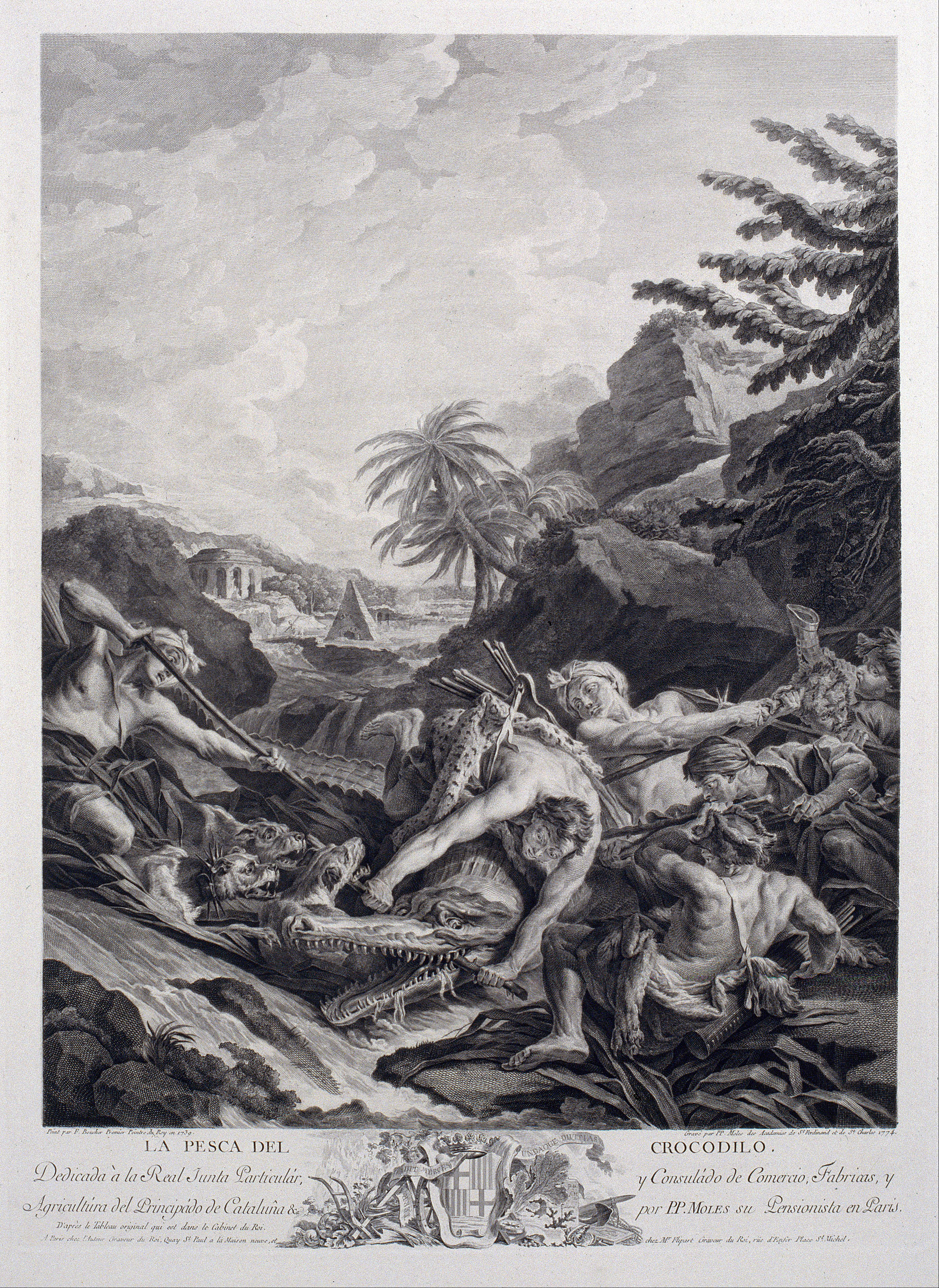
Crocodile Hunting (1774), by Pasqual Pere Moles, Museu Nacional d'Art de Catalunya, Barcelona.

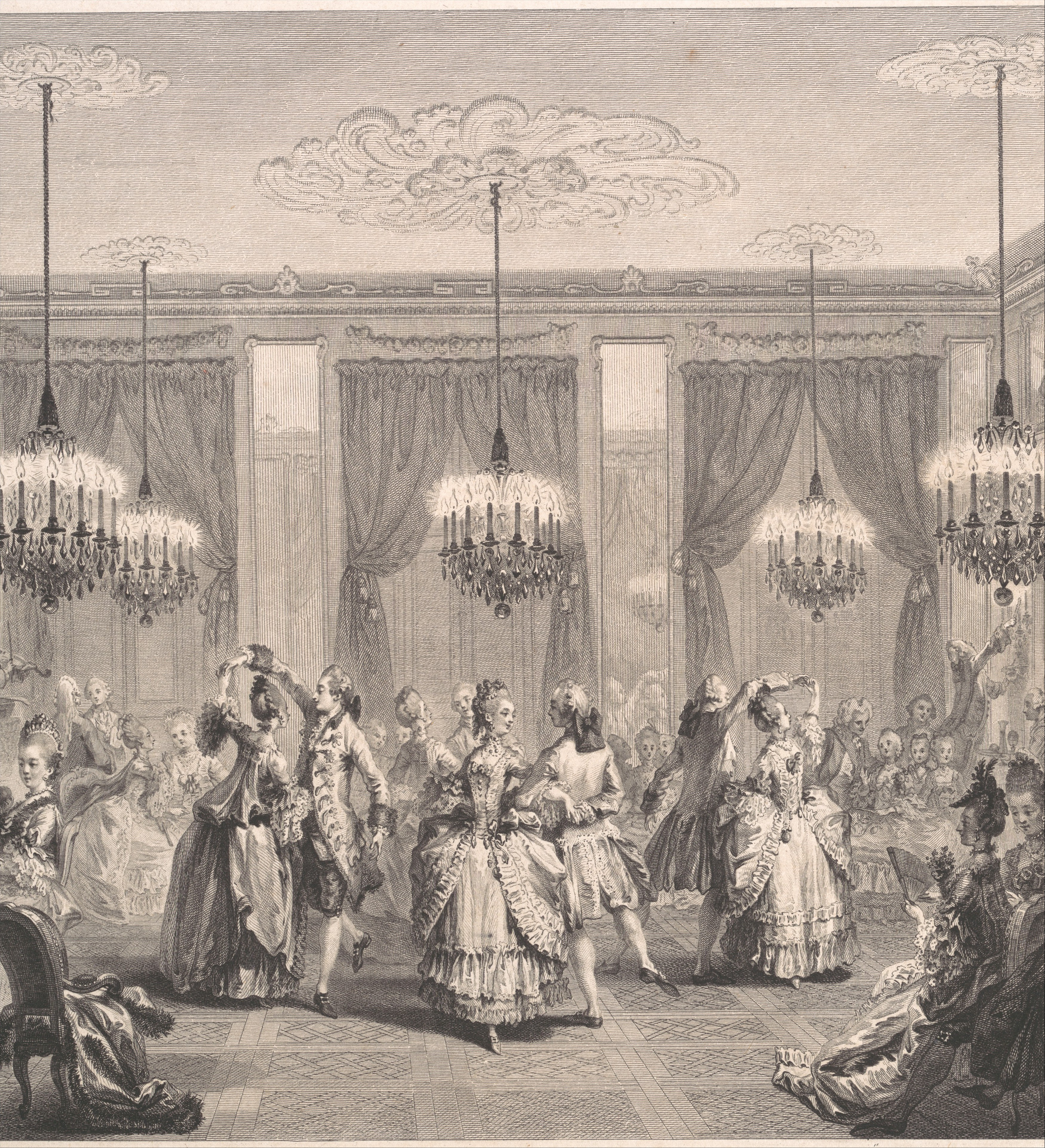
Le Bal Paré (1774), by Augustin de Saint-Aubin, Metropolitan Museum of Art, New York.

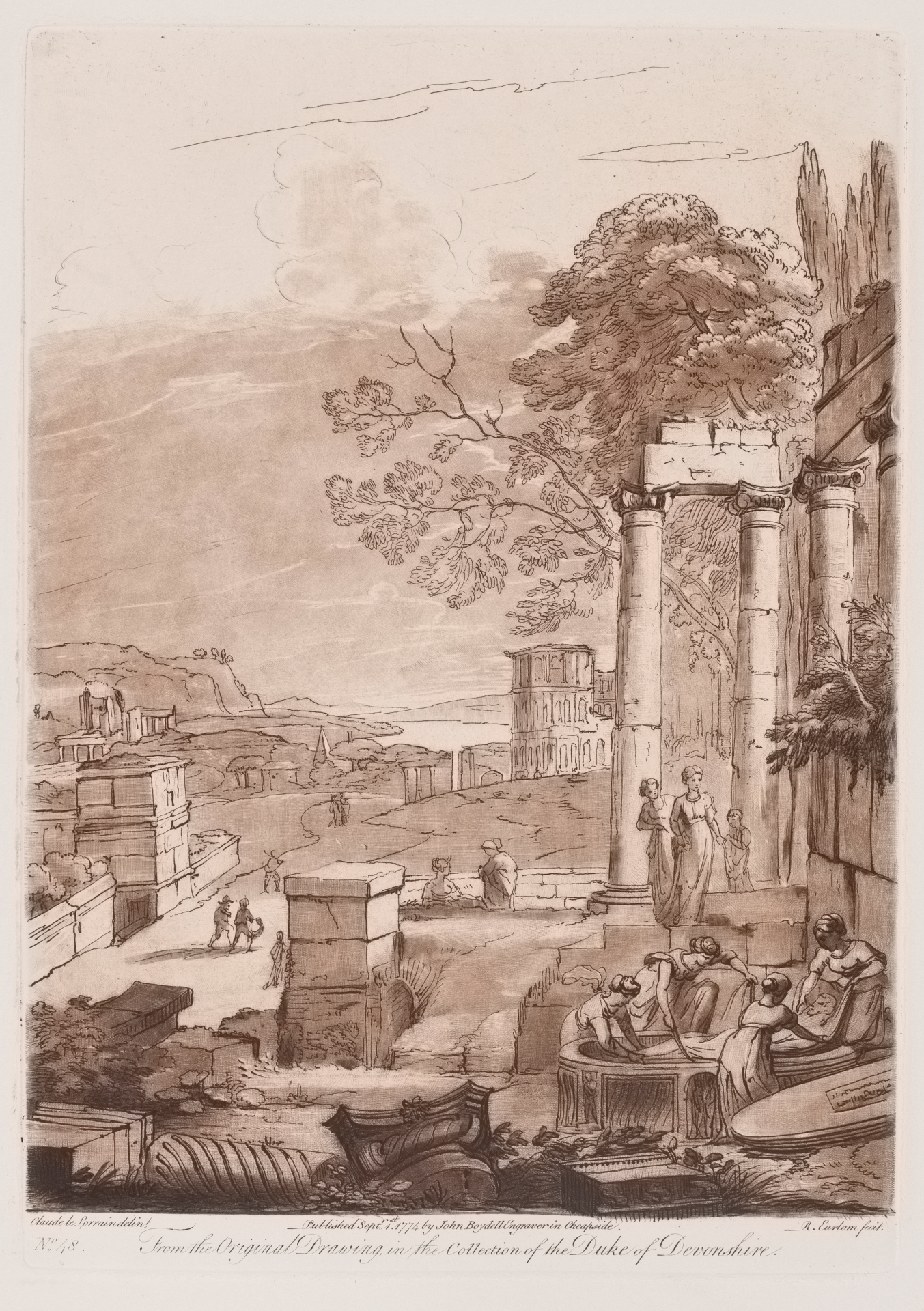
Landscape with the Burial of St. Serapia (1776), by Richard Earlom, on an original by Claude Lorrain, Pushkin Museum, Moscow.

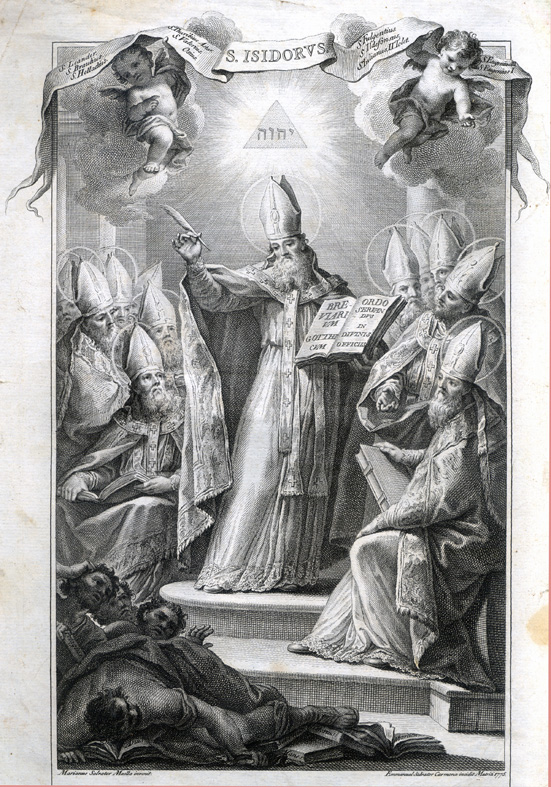
St. Isidore (1778), by Manuel Salvador Carmona, University of Navarra.

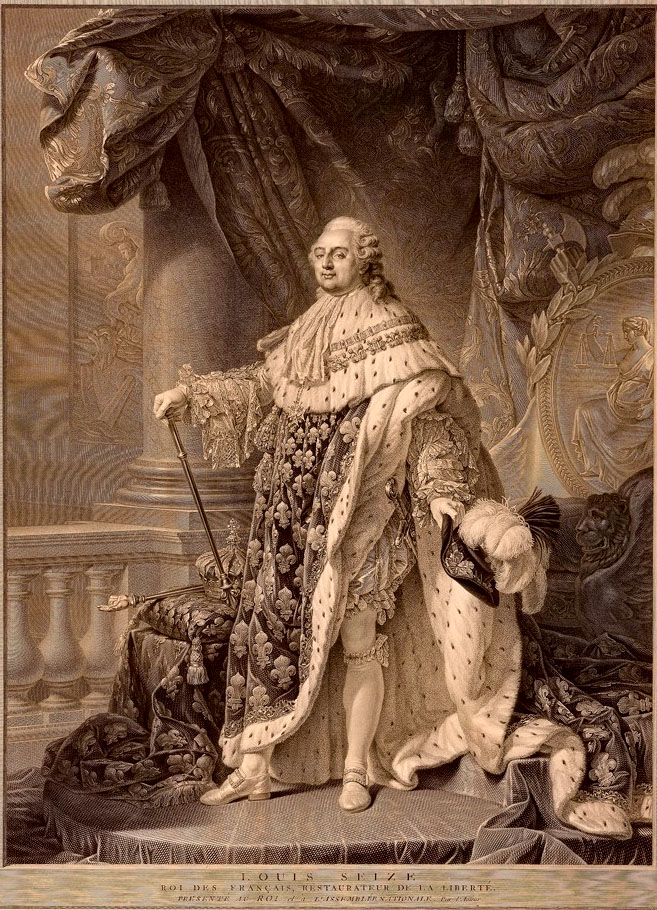
Louis XVI (1790), by Charles-Clément Balvay, Fogg Art Museum, Cambridge.

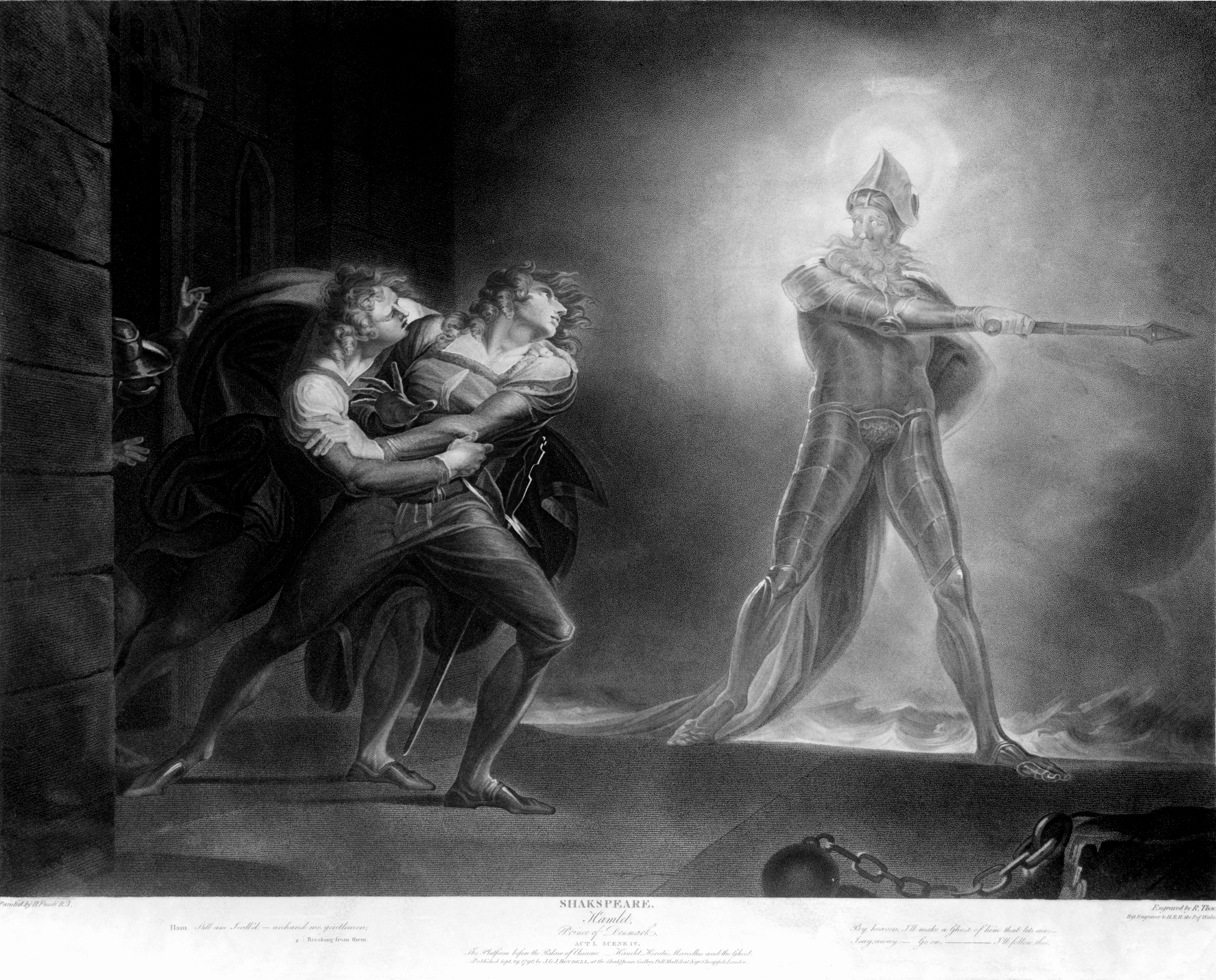
Hamlet, Prince of Denmark, Act I, Scene IV (1796), by Henry Fuseli, Metropolitan Museum of Art, New York.

== See also ==
- European printmaking in the 19th century
- European printmaking in the 20th century
