= Juan Bernabé Palomino =

Spanish engraver

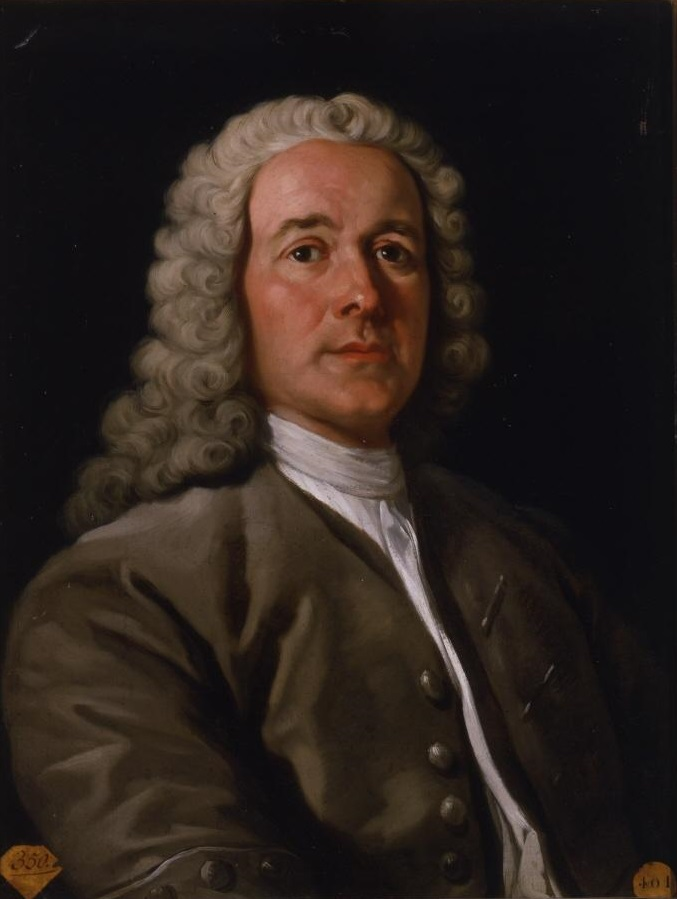
Juan Bernabé Palomino; by Antonio González Ruiz (1741)

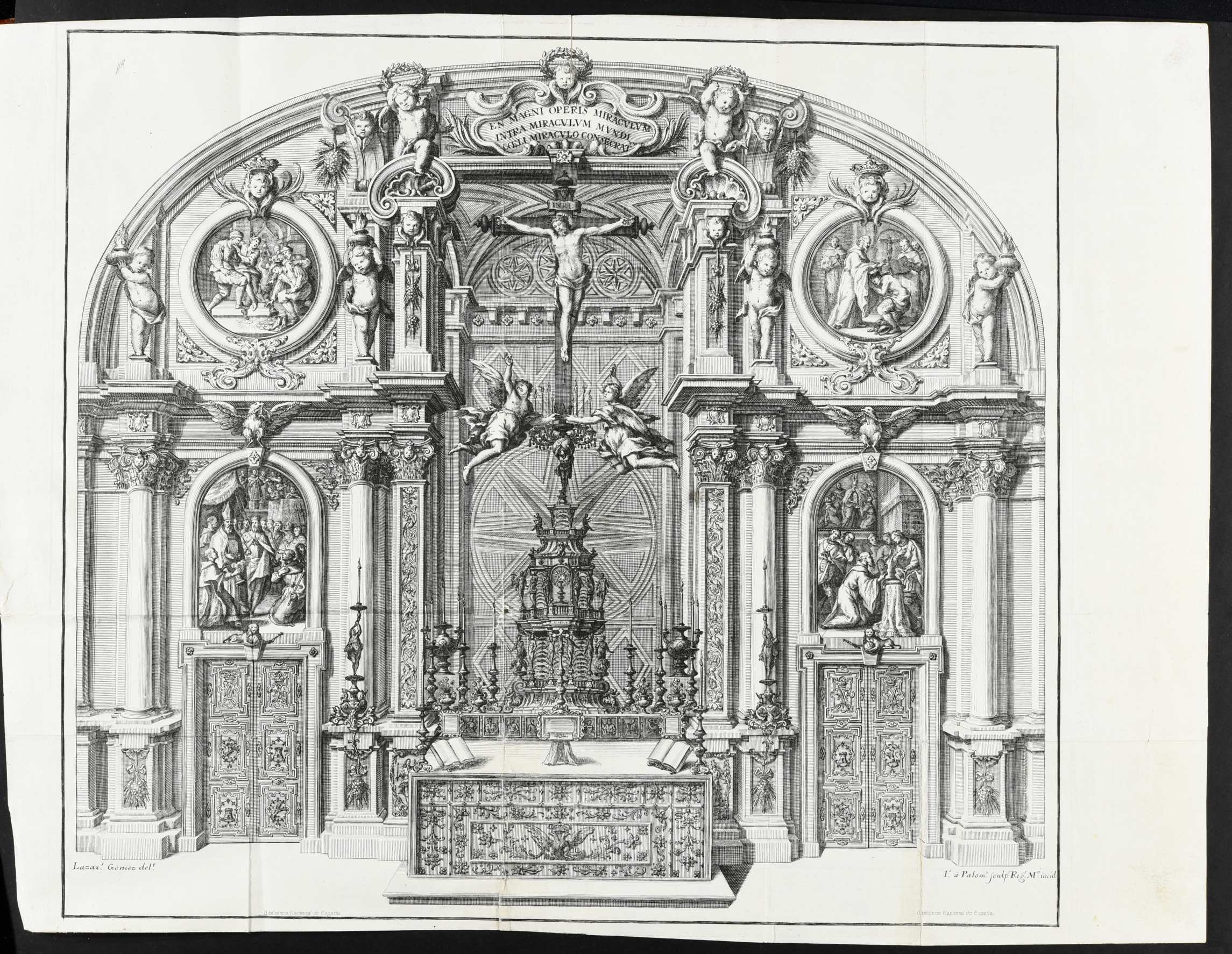
The Altar in the sacristy of the monastery at El Escorial

Juan Bernabé Palomino y Fernández de la Vega (1692, Córdoba - 1777, Madrid) was a Spanish engraver.

== Life and works ==
His father was a silversmith and his uncle was the artist and writer, Antonio Palomino. Sometime before his uncle's death in 1726, he was already at his workshop in Madrid, reproducing some of his designs and drawings in print and looking after the plates for the second volume of El Museo pictórico y escala óptica.

According to Juan Agustín Ceán Bermúdez, he returned to Córdoba that year and perfected his technique by carefully observing and imitating the works of other teachers. Once he was satisfied with his skills, he went back to Madrid.

In 1752, he was chosen as Director of Intaglio at the Real Academia de Bellas Artes de San Fernando; a position he held until his death. He also held the title of Court Engraver. An inventory of his assets, made on the occasion of his second marriage in 1767, indicates that he had amassed a considerable fortune. It also mentions some paintings he had made, although nothing currently exists other than his engravings, save two apostles' heads drawn in pastels, which are preserved at the Academia.

As an engraver, he devoted himself to single devotional prints, portraits (notably that of Isabel de Farnesio), and reproductions of well known paintings and sculptures. These include a Saint Bruno, after a work by Manuel Pereira, a "Miracle of Saint Isidore", after Juan Carreño de Miranda, and a "Saint Peter in Prison", after Juan de Roelas. He occasionally provided illustrations for books.

His son, Juan Fernando Palomino, also became a well known engraver and followed his father as an official of the Academia.
