= A way of flying =

Print by Francisco Goya

- Modo de volar (Spanish)
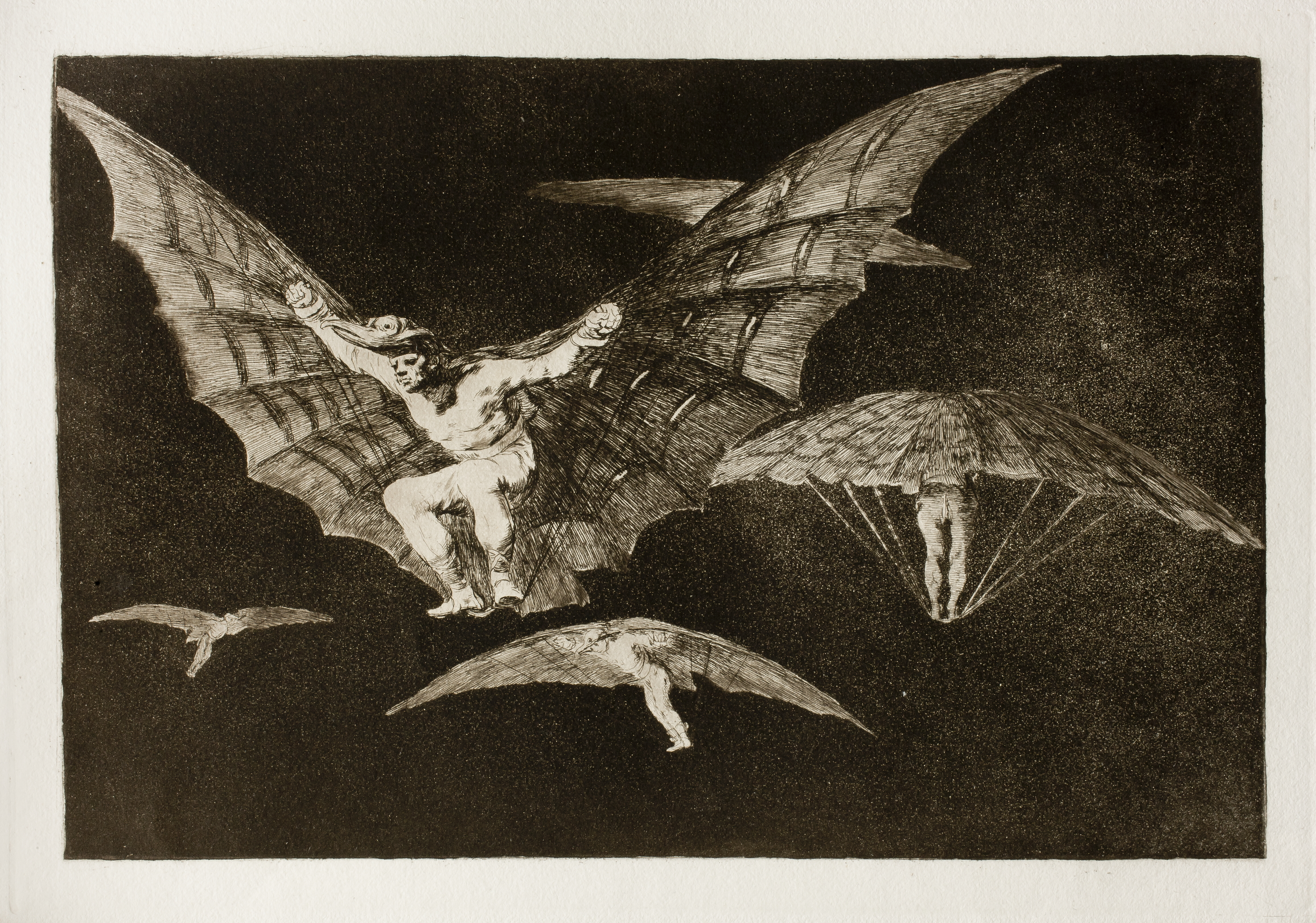
- Artist: Francisco Goya
- Year: 1815–16
- Type: Etching, aquatint and drypoint
- Medium: laid paper
- Dimensions: 24. cm × 35.8 cm (8 7/16 in × 5 7/8 in)
- Location: Various print rooms have a print from the first edition. The one illustrated is at the Museo del Prado

A way of flying (Spanish: Modo de volar) is a print by the Spanish painter and printmaker Francisco Goya. Created between 1815 and 1816, it is the 13th of the 22 aquatints making up the series Los disparates. Along with the rest of the series it was first published in 1864 by the Real Academia de Nobles Artes de San Fernando.

A number of different interpretations for the work have been considered. Some have seen Goya's use of flight as a metaphor for instability, human irrationality and the inconstancy of fortune. Other commentators have seen it as a metaphor for political and philosophical innovation.

== Preparatory drawings ==
As with all of his prints, Goya produced a preparatory drawing for A way of flying. There is also an artist's proof that was made with just the etched image before the aquatint was added.

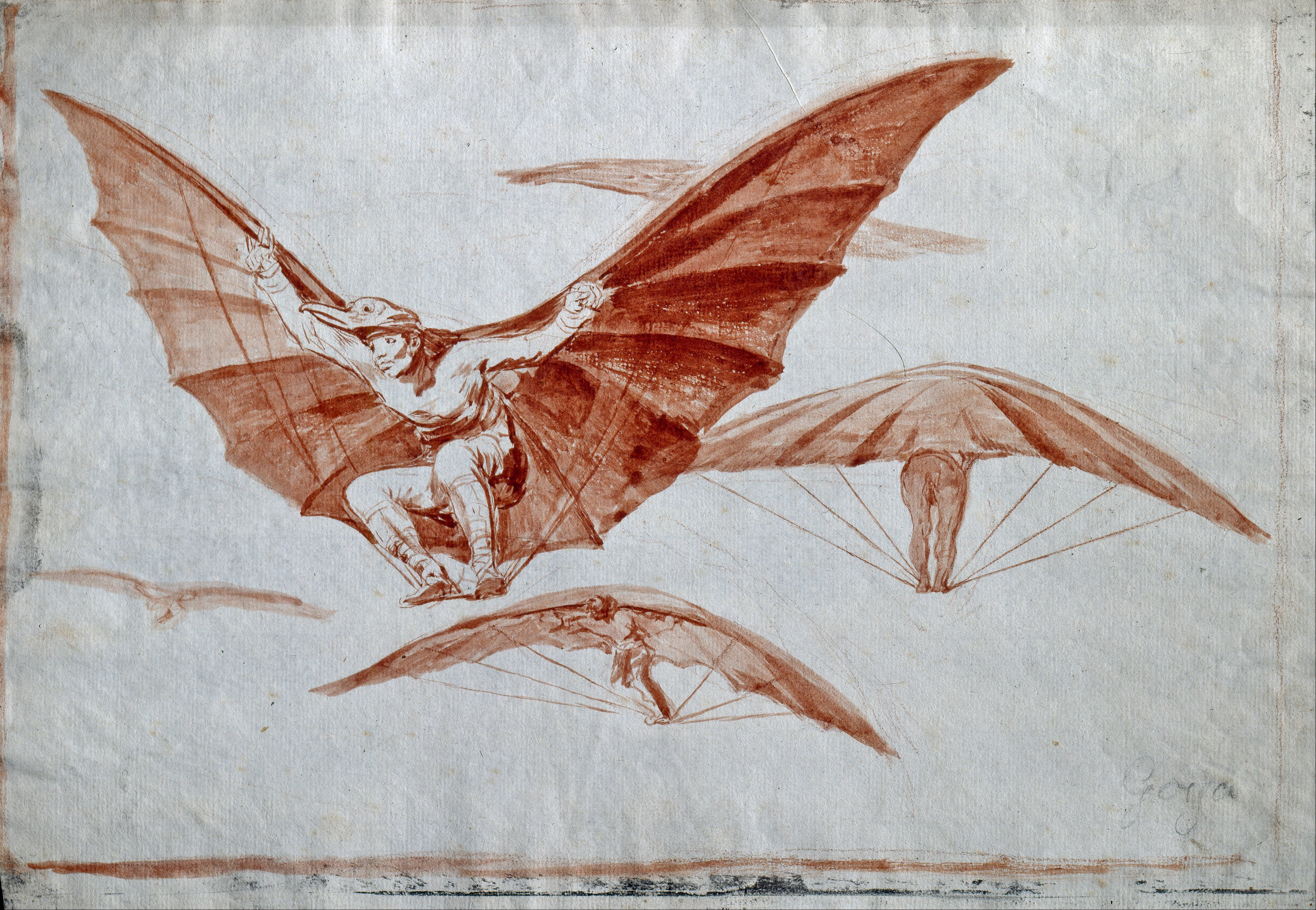
Drawing

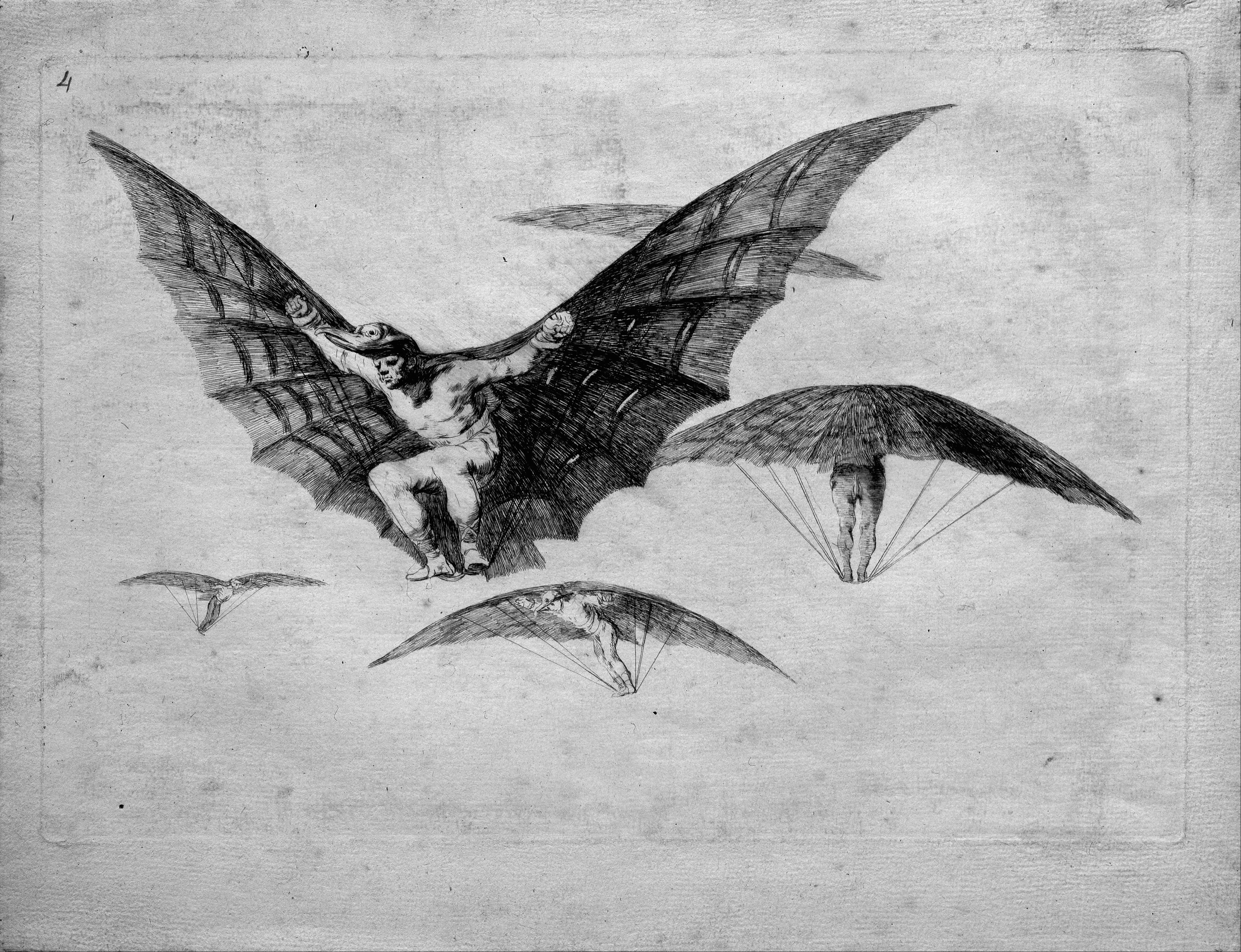
Artist's proof

== Technique ==
A way of flying was made using etching and drypoint to create the lines and aquatint to create the background. It was made on laid paper.
