= Tomás Francisco Prieto =

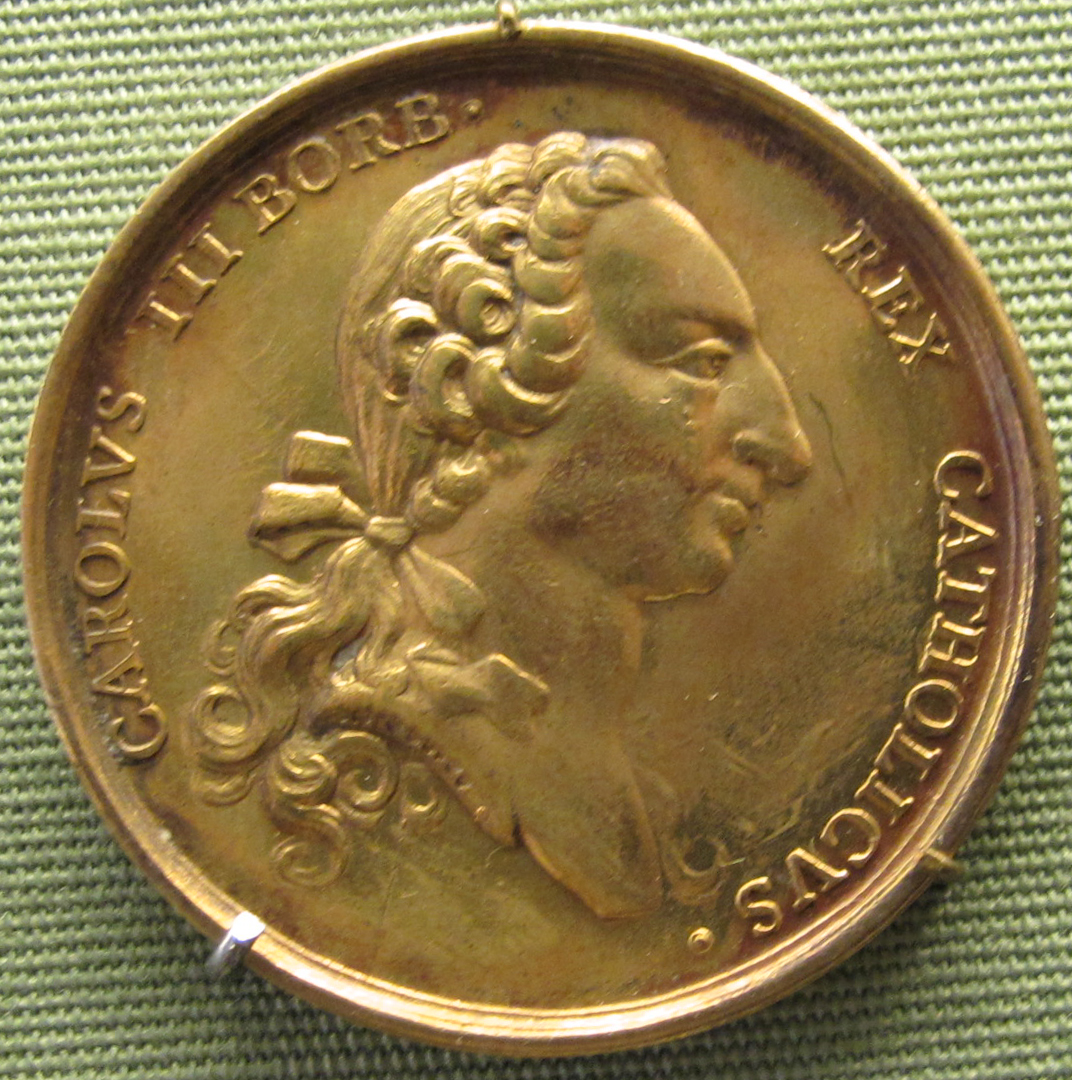
Medal of Charles III of Spain, 1759

Tomás Francisco Prieto (1716 in Salamanca – December 19, 1782 in Madrid) was a Spanish engraver and medallist.

== Biography ==
Prieto was born at Salamanca and became a pupil of Lorenzo Monteman y Cusens. Prieto later became director of the Royal Academy of San Fernando. His daughter Maria de Loretto (1753–1772) also became an engraver. She was born in Madrid. She was received an honorary member of the Academy of San Fernando.

== See also ==
- Museo Casa de la Moneda (Madrid)
