= Georg Friedrich Schmidt =

German engraver and designer (1712–1775)

Georg Schmidt
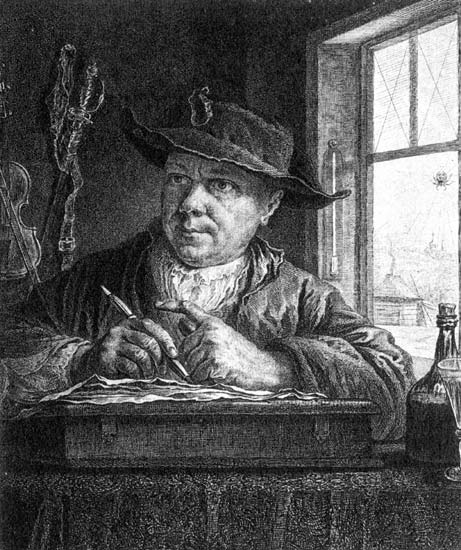
- Self-portrait "with spider" (1758)
- Born: 24 January 1712; Wandlitz, Prussia
- Died: 25 January 1775 (aged 63); Berlin, Prussia

Georg Friedrich Schmidt (24 January 1712 - 25 January 1775) was a German engraver, etcher and pastel painter, in the Rococo style.

== Life and work ==
His parents were cloth makers, and it was originally intended that he would follow them into the trade, but he displayed artistic talent at an early age. When he was fourteen, he was allowed to take lessons at the Prussian Academy of Arts. On the advice of his teachers, an apprenticeship for him was obtained with the engraver, Georg Paul Busch.

In the 1730s, he began his mandatory military service, but continued to produce engravings. After doing one of then-Crown Prince Frederick he was released from service, through the intercession of Frederick's mentor, Friedrich Wilhelm von Grumbkow, and started his own business.

During his time at the Academy, he befriended the Director and court painter, Antoine Pesne, who was originally from France. Pesne provided him with a recommendation to the painter, Nicolas Lancret, so he could continue his studies in Paris. In 1736, together with his former fellow-student and friend, Friedrich Wilhelm Hoeder, he left Berlin and headed there. While passing through Straßburg, they met the engraver, Johann Georg Wille, and he joined them. Schmidt and he shared a room for several years, while waiting for admission to the Académie Royale de Peinture et de Sculpture, and became close friends. A small pension from then-King Frederick helped him live in relative ease.

Nicolas IV de Larmessin, "Engraver to the King", took him into his workshop, where he completed a seven-month training course; engraving portraits for art dealers and providing some illustrations for the publisher, Michel Odieuvre. In 1740, with some assistance from Hyacinthe Rigaud, he became self-employed. In 1742, King Louis XV officially granted permission for Protestants to attend the Académie Royale. The following year, however, he accepted an offer to become a court engraver back in Berlin. He returned there in the middle of the Second Silesian War, and his first major assignment was creating tactical maps of the battles of Kesselsdorf and Soor, which were published in 1746. That same year, he married Dorothée Luise Viedebandt, whose father was Director of the Russian Trading Company in Berlin. A large dowry may have been a factor. Two years later, their son August was born. He turned out to be an unruly child, who sometimes sold his father's works secretly and squandered the money.

Much of his work involved illustrating King Frederick's writings, although he also produced portraits and copies of the works of Rembrandt. Following the outbreak of the Seven Years' War, the demand for art decreased dramatically, and tensions rose at the court. As did many of his colleagues, he accepted an invitation from Empress Elizabeth of Russia and went to St. Petersburg on leave, without his family. He would spend five years there. From 1758, he was the head of an engraving school. Most of his work involved portraits. Despite numerous requests for him to stay, he left shortly after Elizabeth's death, in 1762, and returned to Berlin. August died in 1766, aged only eighteen.

Having established his reputation throughout Europe, he soon became a wealthy man and was able to acquire a collection of original etchings by Rembrandt. He did, however, continue to give lessons at the Prussian Academy. Over the years, his style fell out of fashion, and he found himself slowly being overshadowed by younger engravers who were willing to work for less. Dorothée died in 1771, and Georg followed in 1775, aged sixty-three. His estate was sold at auction. His tomb, in the Luisenstädtische Kirche, was destroyed along with the church during World War II.

== Selected works ==
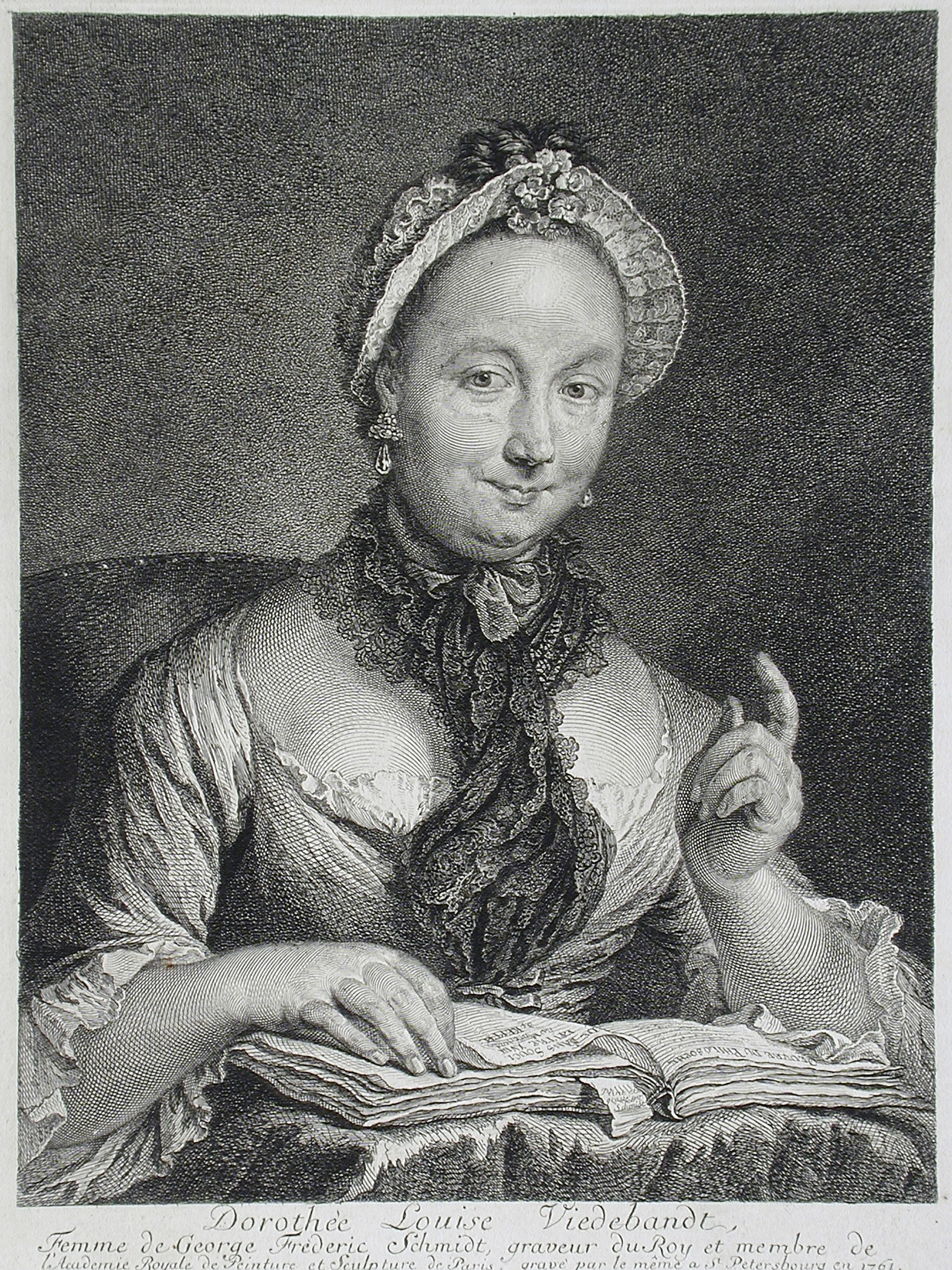
Dorothee Louise Schmidt, 1761

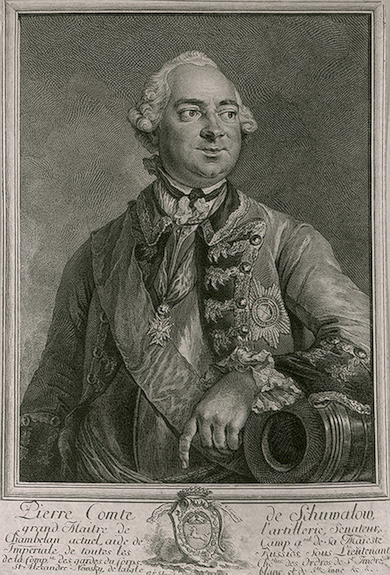
Count Schuwalow, 1760

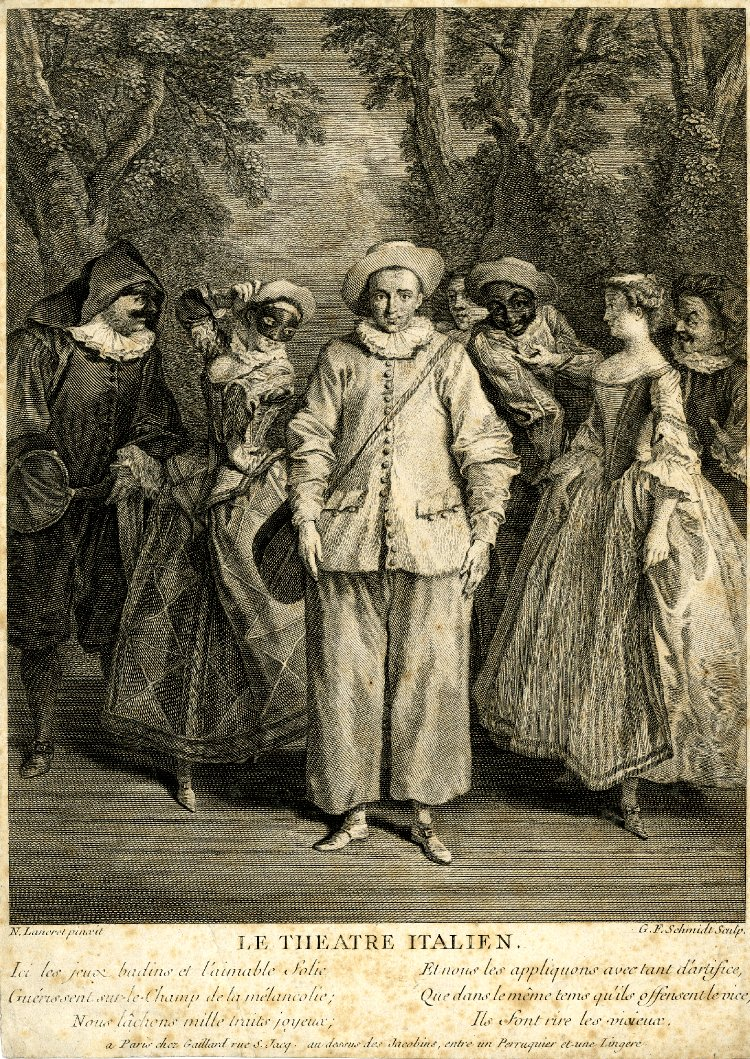
The Italian Theatre; after Nicolas Lancret, 1738

The Schmettau-Plan for Berlin, 1750

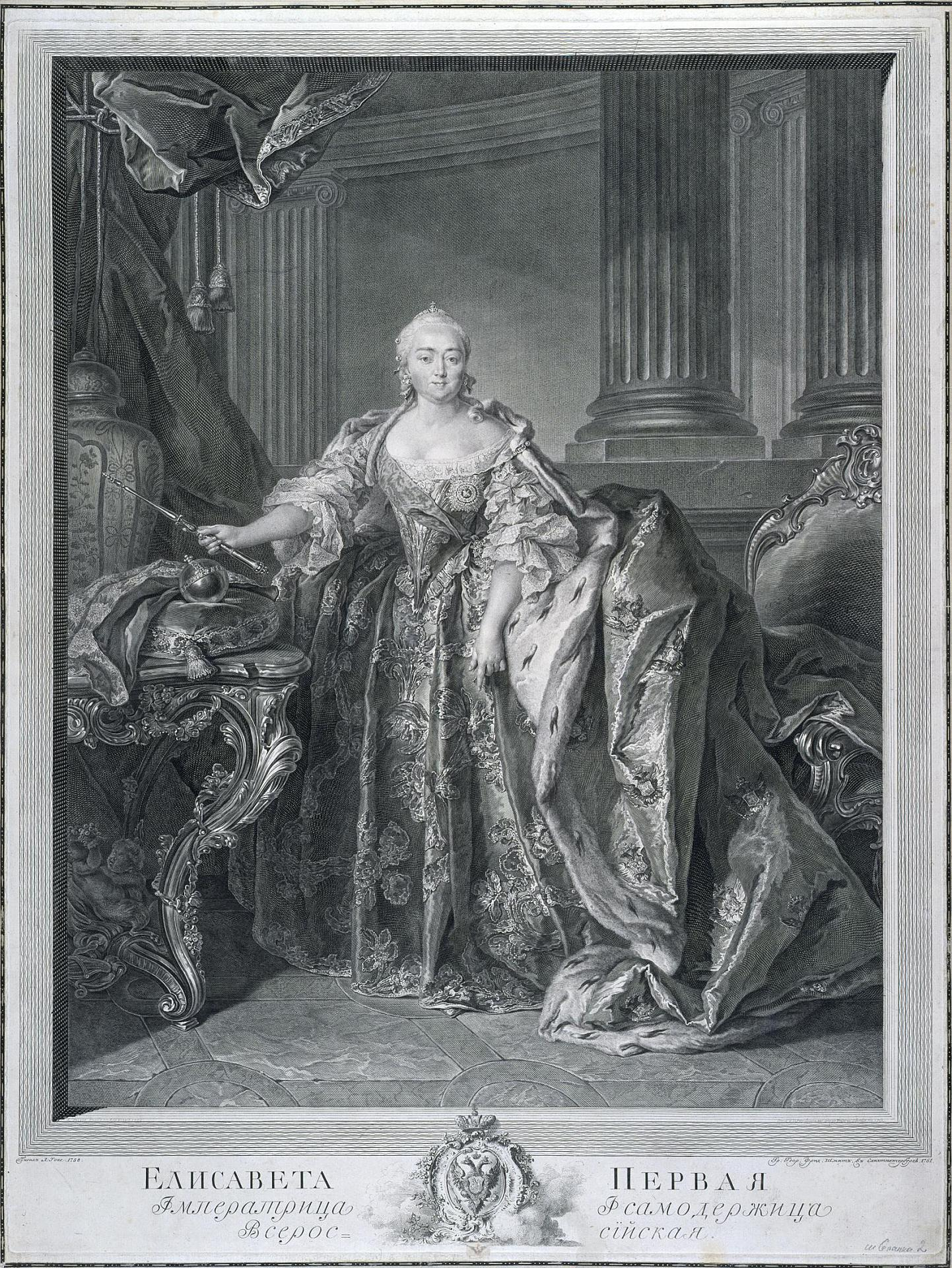
Empress Elisabeth; after Louis Tocqué, 1761

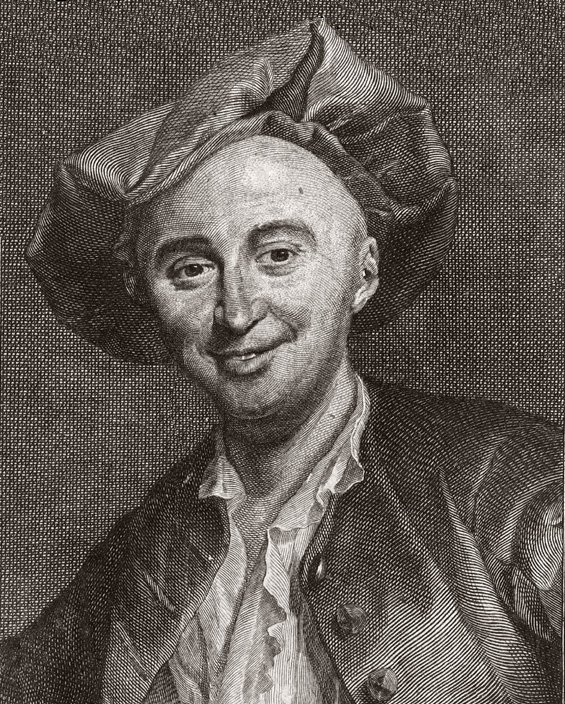
Julien Offray de La Mettrie, 1751

== Sources ==
- Nachricht von Hrn. Georg Friedrich Schmidt in Berlin. In: Carl Heinrich von Heineken (Ed.): Nachrichten von Künstlern und Kunst-Sachen. Vol.1, Krauß, Leipzig 1768, pp.164–174 (Online).
- Georg Kaspar Nagler: Neues allgemeines Künstler-Lexicon oder Nachrichten von dem Leben und den Werken der Maler, Bildhauer, Baumeister, Kupferstecher, Formschneider, Lithographen, Zeichner, Medailleure, Elfenbeinarbeiter etc. Fünfzehnter Band: „Santi, Antonio – Schoute, Jan“. Verlag von E. A. Fleischmann, München 1845, pp.299–337
- Joseph Eduard Wessely: Kritische Verzeichnisse von Werken hervorragender Kupferstecher. Band 1: Georg Friedrich Schmidt. Verzeichniss seiner Stiche und Radirungen. Haendcke & Lehmkuhl, Hamburg 1887 (Online).
- Paul Seidel: Zur Geschichte der Kunst unter Friedrich dem Großen. In: Hohenzollern-Jahrbuch. Forschungen und Abbildungen zur Geschichte der Hohenzollern in Brandenburg-Preußen 5, 1901, pp.60–86 (Online).
- Paul Dehnert: Georg Friedrich Schmidt, der Hofkupferstecher des Königs. In: Jahrbuch Preußischer Kulturbesitz Vol.16, 1979, pp.321–339.
- Rainer Michaelis: Betrachtungen zum malerischen Werk des preußischen Hofkupferstechers Georg Friedrich Schmidt (1712–1775). In: Jahrbuch Preußischer Kulturbesitz Vol.35, 1999, pp.221–235.
- (in German) Konstantin Vladimirovič Malinovskij: Schmidt, Georg Friedrich. In: Allgemeines Künstlerlexikon. Die Bildenden Künstler aller Zeiten und Völker (AKL). Band 102, de Gruyter, Berlin [?], S. 53
