= Juan Bautista Ravanals =

Juan Bautista Ravanals (1678-?) was a Spanish engraver. He was born at Valencia. He studied under Evaristo Muñoz. He engraved an equestrian portrait of King Philip V of Spain and a genealogical tree of the royal family; a portrait of Father Gregorio Ridaura, a print of San Rodrigo, a second portrait of Philip V., some plates for the first edition of a mathematical work by Tosca, the frontispiece for a book called Centro de la Fe Ortodoxa, which represents the apparition of Our Lady del Pilar to St. Francis and some of his disciples, and illustrations for another book of Devotion, in which St. Thomas Aquinas and other saints figure.
