= Carmona (surname) =

Carmona is a Portuguese and Spanish surname. Notable persons with that name include:

- Adriana Carmona (born 1972), Venezuelan taekwondo practitioner
- Alberto Porro Carmona (born 1980), Spanish conductor, composer, author, music lecturer, teacher and saxophonist
- Alejandro Carmona (born 1983), Puerto Rican basketball player
- Ana María Cobo Carmona (born 1973), Spanish politician
- Andrea Meza Carmona (born 1994), Miss Universe 2020
- Carlos “Charly” Carmona (living), Mexican Graphic Designer
- Anthony Carmona (born 1953), fifth President of Trinidad and Tobago
- Antonio Carmona Añorve (living), Mexican director of police, current governor of Baja California
- Arthur Paul Carmona (1982–2008), American wrongfully convicted person
- Carlos Carmona (born 1987), Chilean football player
- Carlos Carmona Bonet (born 1987), Spanish football player
- Carmona Rodrigues (born 1956), Portuguese university professor and politician, grand-nephew of Óscar
- Chango Carmona (born 1944), Mexican boxer
- Fausto Carmona, false name used until 2012 by Roberto Hernández (born 1980), Dominican baseball pitcher
- Fernando Ocaranza Carmona (1876–1965), Mexican surgeon, university rector and military officer
- Giancarlo Carmona (born 1985), Peruvian football player
- Grégory Carmona (born 1979), French football player
- Juan Antonio Salvador Carmona, Spanish engraver
- Luis Salvador Carmona, Spanish sculptor
- Manuel Salvador Carmona (1734–1820), Spanish engraver and designer
- Nicanor Carmona (1842–1940), Peruvian politician
- Olga Carmona (born 2000), Spanish footballer
- Óscar Carmona (1869–1951), President of Portugal, 1926–1951
- Pedro Carmona Estanga (born 1941), Venezuelan businessman, transitional president during the coup attempt of 2002
- Pedro Carmona-Alvarez (born 1972), Chilean novelist, poet and musician
- Pedro Carmona (footballer) (born 1988), Brazilian football player
- Rafael Carmona (born 1972), Puerto Rican baseball player
- Reema Harrysingh-Carmona (born 1970), First Lady of Trinidad and Tobago, of Indo-Trinidadian American heritage
- Richard Carmona (born 1949), American physician, nurse, police officer, public health administrator, and politician
- Rigoberto Romero Carmona (1940–1991), Cuban photographer
- Robert Carmona-Borjas, Venezuelan lawyer, academic and writer
- Salvador Carmona (born 1975), Mexican football player
- Víctor Rolando Arroyo Carmona, Cuban geographer and journalist
- Walter Carmona (born 1957), Brazilian judoka
