= Luis Fernández Noseret =

Spanish engraver

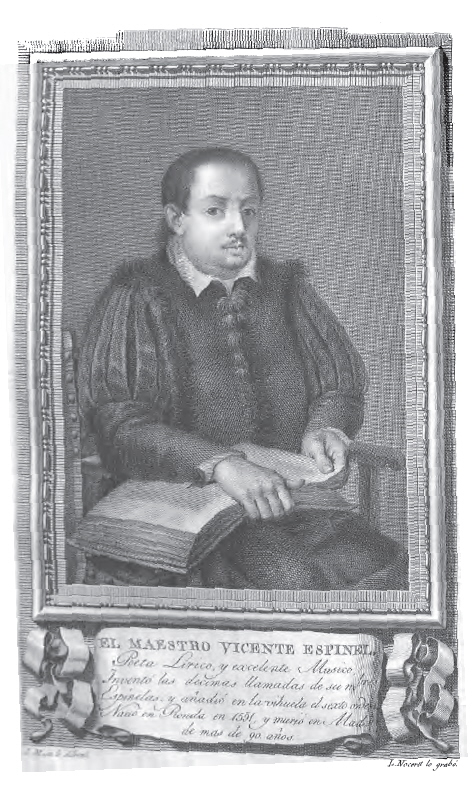
Portrait of Vicente Espinel

Luis Fernández Noseret (fl. 1793-1829, Madrid) was a Spanish engraver who studied with Manuel Salvador Carmona at the Real Academia de Bellas Artes de San Fernando.

== Works ==
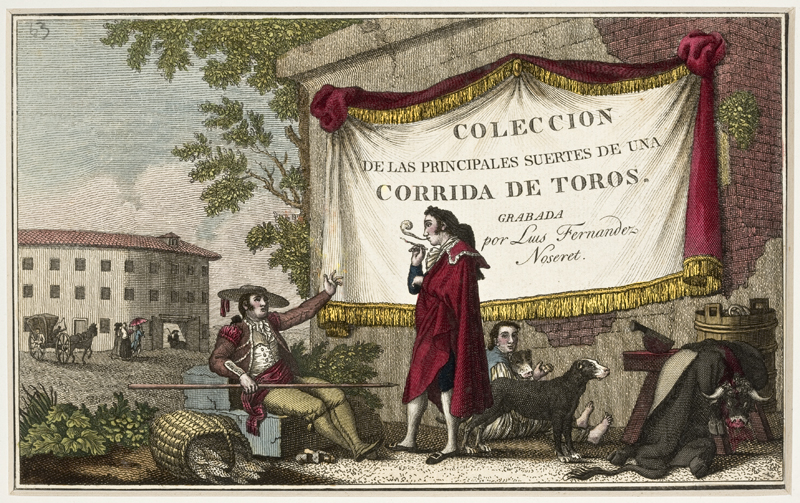
Colección de las principales suertes de una corrida de toros (1795). Colored etching.

He created numerous illustrations for the collection Portraits of Illustrious Spaniards, including those of Vicente Espinel and Luis de Requesens, under the direction of his teacher, Carmona, and Juan Sebastián Elcano, after drawings by José López Enguídanos. At the "Royal Company for engraving", he was charged with reproducing the Saint Catalina by Guido Reni, after a drawing by León Bueno (fl. 1790-1810); again, under the direction of Carmona. He is also known for a copy of the Saint Joseph by Alonso Cano, after a drawing by José Camarón and portraits of King Charles II and Father Francisco de los Santos, taken from the paintings by Claudio Coello in the sacristy of the Monasterio de El Escorial.

In 1795, he created the Collection of the Principal Sorties of a Bullfight, after those of Antonio Carnicero. In 1819, he presented some devotional prints to the Academia for approval. These were taken from drawings by Antonio Guerrero. They included images of Aloysius Gonzaga, Saint Nicholas, Saint Isidore and Mary of Egypt.

His last known work was in 1829, when he created illustrations for Meditations on Divine Attributes for Every Day of the Year by Teodoro de Almeida.
