= Luis Salvador Carmona =

Spanish sculptor (1708–1767)

- Born: 15 November 1708; Nava del Rey, Spain
- Died: 4 February 1767 (aged 58); Madrid, Spain
- Known for: Sculpture
- Movement: Baroque

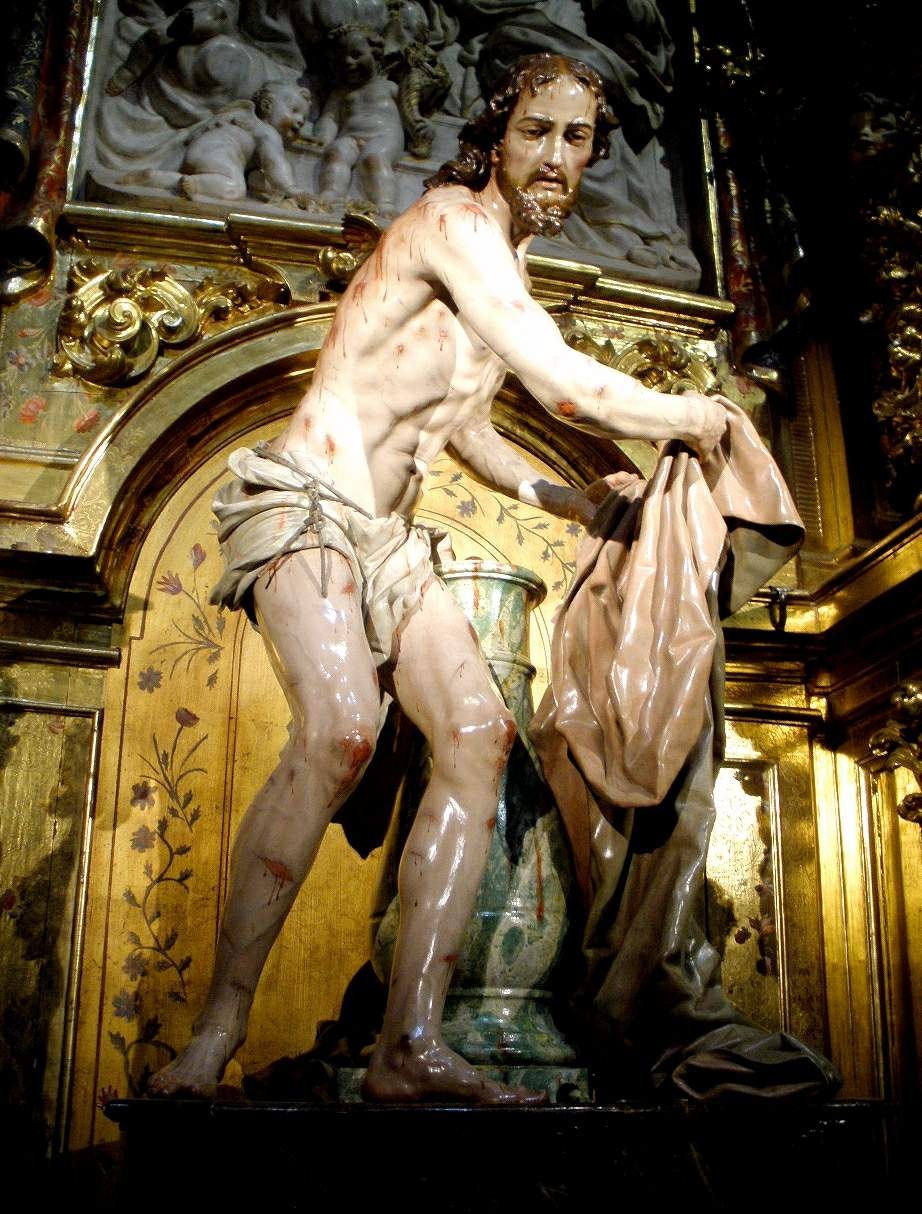
Christ, Picking Up His Clothes

Luis Salvador Carmona (1708, Nava del Rey – 1767, Madrid) was a Spanish Baroque sculptor who came from a family of artists.

== Biography ==
His parents were of modest means, but when he showed artistic aptitude, they sent him to Segovia to study. This was followed by an apprenticeship in Madrid, at the workshop of the sculptor, Juan Alonso Villabrille y Ron. There, he established his style, participated in several commissions, and was able to open his own workshop in 1731. That same year, he married Custodia Fernández and they had four children. She died in 1759 and he married again; to Antonia Ros, who died barely two years later.

His first commissions as a professional involved stone work at several public buildings and sculptures for the Royal Palace (1750-1753). At the Royal Court, he made acquaintances who were involved in planning the Real Academia de Bellas Artes de San Fernando and, after its opening in 1752, he and Juan Pascual de Mena were named the Lieutenant-Directors of sculpture. His popularity was widespread and he worked in several locations outside Madrid, including Guipúzcoa, Seville and Navarra.

Although he had numerous assistants, it appears that they were closely supervised and that he provided the finishing touches to each work himself. Among those who trained with him were his son, Bruno, who accompanied several scientific expeditions as an artist, his nephews Manuel and Juan Antonio, who became well-known engravers, and the sculptor Francisco Gutiérrez Arribas.

In 1764, he was forced to reduce his work load, due to a serious illness. Contemporary sources described him as being so beset by "melancholy" that he could make only the most feeble efforts. This condition was aggravated by increasing difficulties with his sight, which eventually resulted in blindness. In 1765, he was forced to resign from his position at the Academia, and he died two years later.

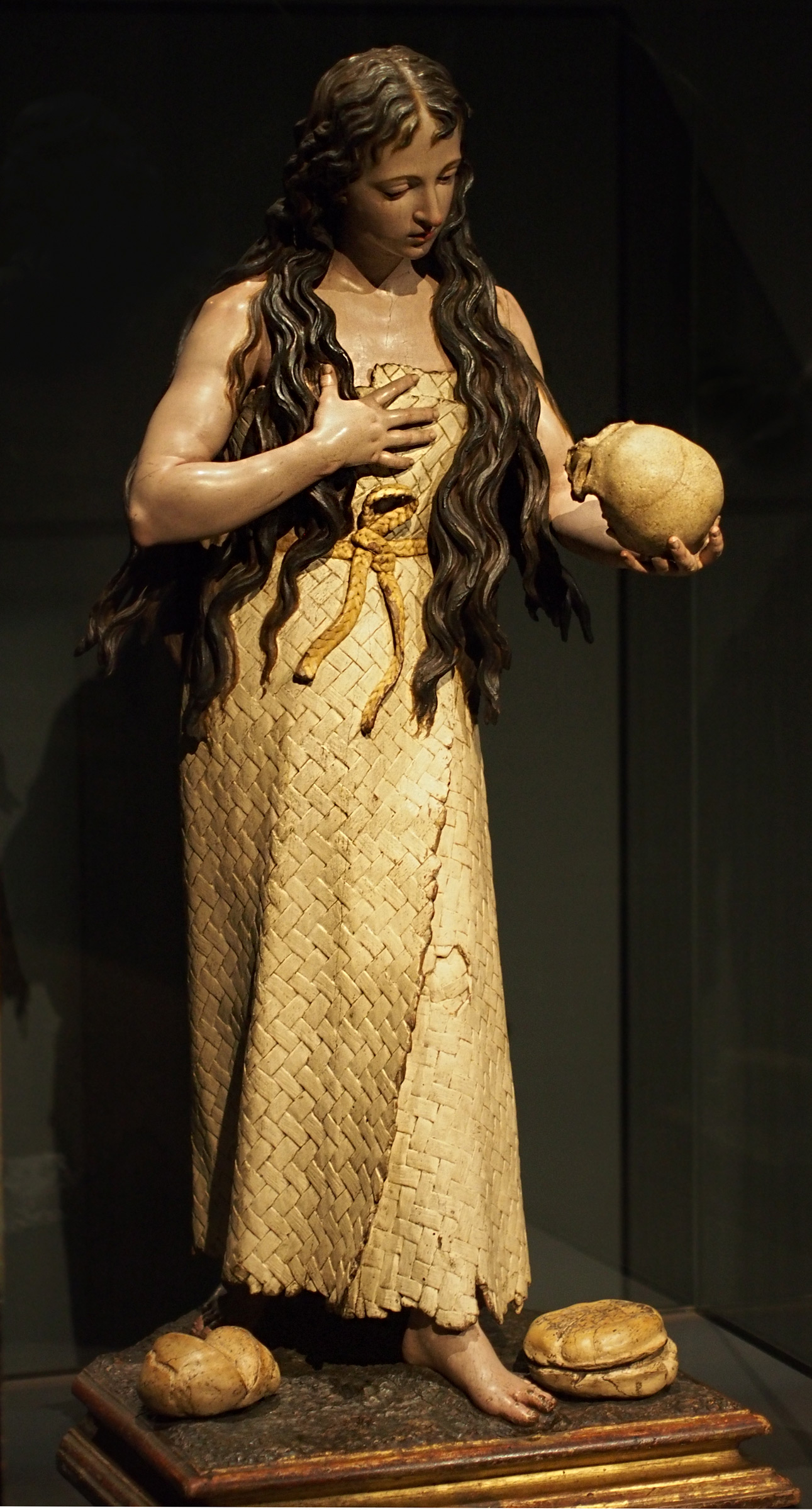
Saint Mary of Egypt

== Selected works ==
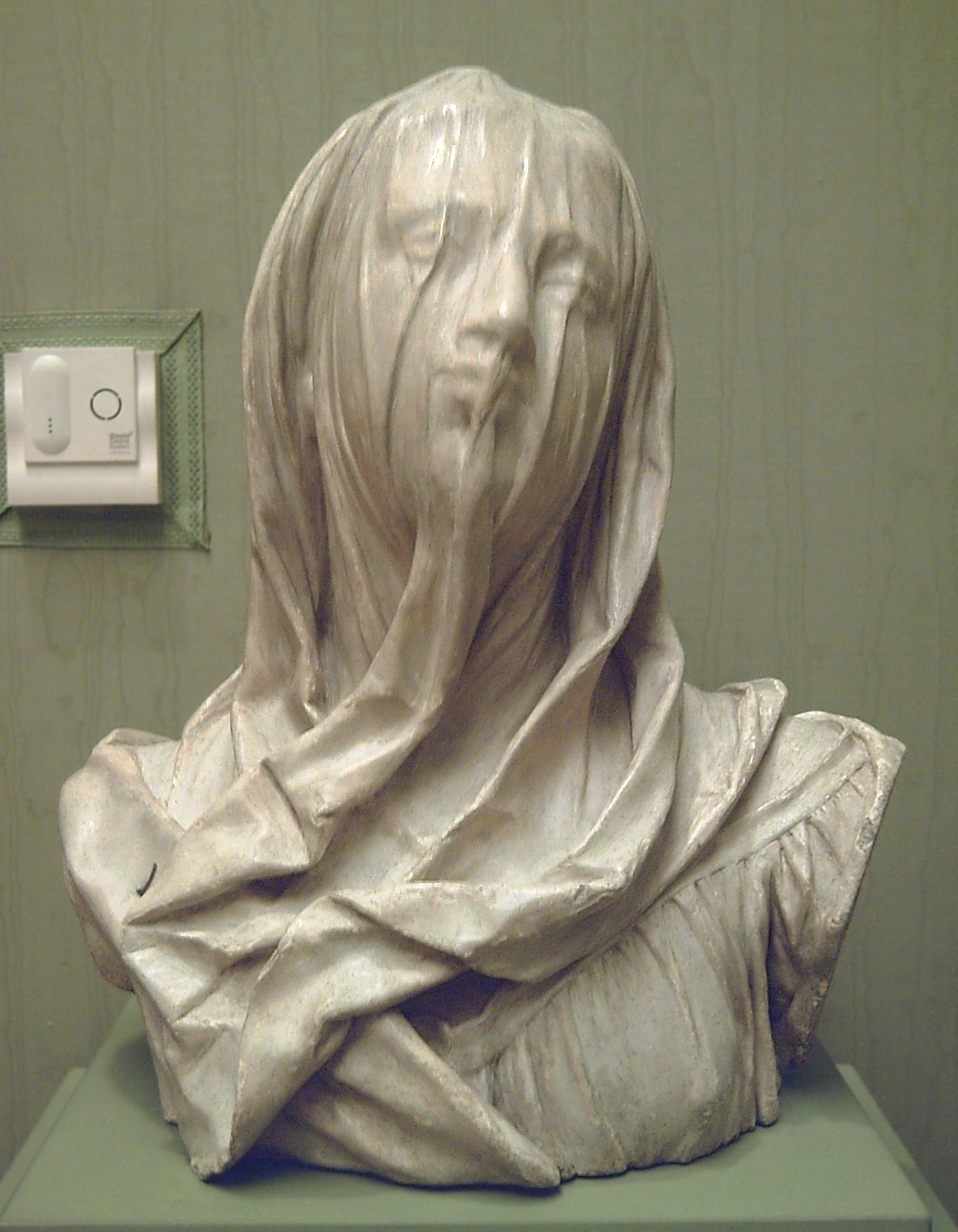
Faith

- Sculptures for the retable (1743-1747), Parish church, Segura
- Divina Pastora (1747), Convent of Capuchins, Nava del Rey
- Christ (1756), Convent of Capuchins, Nava del Rey
- Pieta (1760), New Cathedral, Salamanca
- Crucifix, National Museum of Sculpture, Valladolid
- Flagellated Christ (1760), La Clerecía, Salamanca
- Virgin and Child, Detroit Institute of Arts

== Sources ==
- Garcia Gainza, María Concepción. El escultor Luis Salvador Carmona (1990) ISBN 84-87146-26-0
- E. Lord, Luis Salvador Carmona en el Real sitio de S. Ildefonso de la Granja, Archivo Español de Arte, XXXVI, 101, 1953.
- J. J. Martín González, Escultura Barroca Castellana. Fundacion Lazaro Galdiano, 1959.
- F. J. Sánchez Cantón, Escultura y Pintura del s. XVIII, Ars Hispaniae, XVII. Madrid, 1965.
