= José del Castillo =

Spanish painter

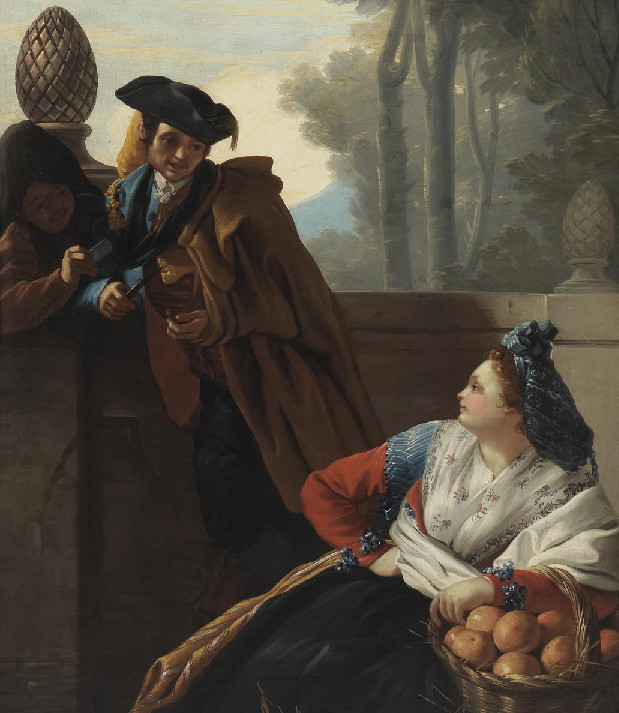
The Orange Seller and the Majo, at the Fuente de Abanico (detail)

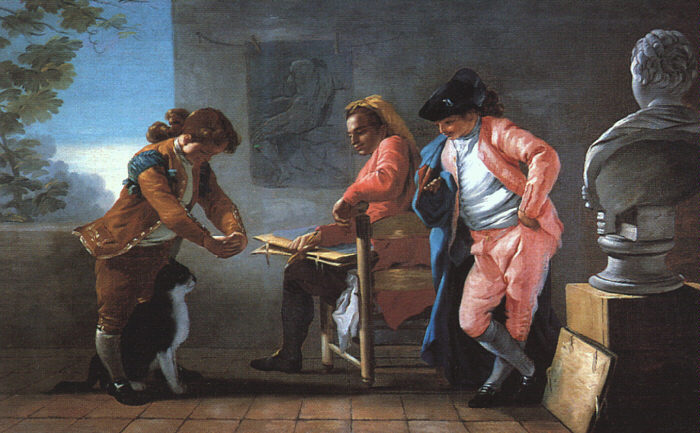
The Painter's Studio

José del Castillo (14 October 1737, Madrid - 5 October 1793, Madrid) was a Spanish painter and engraver in the Neoclassical style. Many of his paintings were done for tapestries.

== Life and work ==
At the age of ten, he became an assistant in the preparatory drawing classes at the Real Academia de Bellas Artes de San Fernando. He showed so much promise that, in 1751, the Secretary of State, José de Carvajal y Lancaster, personally provided him with the funds to go to Rome and study under the direction of Corrado Giaquinto. In 1753, when Giaquinto was called to Spain by King Ferdinand VI, Castillo returned with him and returned to the Academia, where he won a gold medal in 1756. Two years later, he received an official stipend to continue his studies in Rome, where he was married. After completing his studies, he went back to Madrid, travelling through Italy in the company of Juan de Villanueva. He arrived there in 1764.

He immediately joined the Royal Tapestry Factory; painting the designs and "cartones" (cartoons), under the stylistic direction of Anton Raphael Mengs. This would become his primary occupation. He originally copied works by other artists, such as Luca Giordano and his mentor, Giaquinto, but later created his own, based on scenes from daily life. He did execute an occasional religious painting, such as a depiction of Saint Dominic and Saint Francis embracing (1783), which is at the Basilica of San Francisco el Grande, Madrid. He also did some book illustrations: notably drawings for the 1780 edition of Don Quixote, which were engraved by Manuel Salvador Carmona and Fernando Selma.

In 1785, he was named an Academician of Merit at the Academia, but failed in his efforts to become a "Painter to the King". He also sought to become Director of the tapestry factory, with the support of Count Floridablanca, but was opposed by the painter Ramón Bayeu, who had the support of Count Aranda, a court favorite. Shortly after Bayeu's death (and not long before his own), he tried again, with recommendations from several artists, but was still unsuccessful and the post was left vacant.

He also did restorative work at the Palacio del Buen Retiro. Many of his sketches and engravings document works by other artists which have since been lost.
