= Carmona =

Carmona may refer to:

== Places ==
=== Angola ===
- the former name of the town of Uíge

=== Costa Rica ===
- Carmona District, Nandayure, a district in Guanacaste Province

=== India ===
- Carmona, Goa, a village located in the Salcette district of South Goa, India

=== Mexico ===
- Mexquitic de Carmona, a municipality in San Luis Potosí

=== Philippines ===
- Carmona, Cavite, a component city
- Carmona, Gandara, Samar, a barangay
- Carmona, Makati, a barangay

=== Spain ===
- Carmona, Spain, a town in Andalusia
- Carmona, Cantabria, a village in the municipality of Cabuérniga

=== United States ===
- an unincorporated area in Mercer County, Pennsylvania
- an unincorporated area in Polk County, Texas

== People ==
- Carmona (surname), including a list of people with the surname Carmona

== Other ==
- Carmona (plant), a genus of flowering plants in the family Boraginaceae
- Caños de Carmona, sections of a Roman aqueduct in the city of Seville, Spain
