= Emmanuel Reyes Carmona =

Mexican politician (born 1987)

Emmanuel Reyes Carmona (Note: In this Spanish name, the first or paternal surname is Reyes and the second or maternal family name is Carmona.) (born 29 June 1987) is a Mexican politician. Currently a member of the National Regeneration Movement (Morena), he formerly belonged to the Party of the Democratic Revolution (PRD). He was a federal deputy from 2018 to 2024 and, since 2024, sits in the Senate.

== Career ==
Emmanuel Reyes Carmona has a degree in marketing from the Universidad de Guanajuato and a degree in law from the Universidad Superior Bajío. He began his political activity as a member of the National Democratic Alternative current of the PRD and in 2011 he was president of the municipal committee of the PRD in the municipality of Villagrán, Guanajuato.

From 2012 to 2015 he was a regidor (councilor) of Villagrán chaired by Rubén Villafuerte Gasca and from 2015 to 2018 private secretary of the municipal president of Cortazar, Hugo Estefanía Monroy. In 2018 he was a PRD pre-candidate for municipal president of Villagrán but failed to secure the candidacy.

That same year, he was nominated as a candidate for federal deputy by the coalition For Mexico to the Front for Guanajuato's 13th district. He was elected to the 64th Congress that concluded in 2021. In it he was secretary of the Health Commission and member of the Transparency and anti-corruption commissions; Surveillance of the Superior Audit of the Federation; Attention to Vulnerable Groups; of Communications and Transportation; Social Economy and Promotion of Cooperatives; and, Budget and Public Account.

When he was elected, he joined the PRD parliamentary group, but on 19 February 2019, he resigned from his membership in that party and announced his non-cooperation with the Morena parliamentary group. In the 2021 elections, he was nominated for re-election to the 13th district but this time for the Juntos Hacemos Historia coalition; he was re-elected to the position for the 65th Congress from 2021 to 2024. In that legislature he was president of the Health commission; Secretary of the Infrastructure Commission; and member of the Surveillance commissions of the Superior Audit of the Federation; of Communications and Transportation; of Radio and Television; and, of Transparency and Anticorruption.

In the 2024 general election he ran as the alternate of Marcelo Ebrard for a proportional-representation seat in the Senate. Ebrard was elected but resigned his seat at the start of the congressional session to serve in the federal cabinet; Reyes was sworn in to replace him on 5 September.

== Personal life ==
Reyes Carmona is a member of the La Luz del Mundo Church, which has generated public accusations in response to the accusations and conviction for sexual crimes of the church leader Naasón Joaquín García, whom he has publicly defended, rejecting said accusations. The public accusations for his belonging to said religious organization became notorious again when on 1 May 2023 the National Electoral Institute granted registration as a national political association to Humanismo Mexicano, an organization chaired by Reyes Carmona, and in which the deputies and members of La Luz del Mundo Hamlet García Almaguer and Favio Castellanos Polanco are also reportedly involved.
