= Rigoberto (name) =

Rigoberto was a 1945 Argentine comedy film.

Rigoberto is a masculine given name.

== People ==
- Rigoberto Alpizar (1961–2005), Costa Rican-born United States citizen fatally shot by U.S. Federal Air Marshals
- Rigoberto Álvarez (born 1978), Mexican boxer
- Rigoberto Cabezas (1860–1896), Nicaraguan journalist, soldier, and politician
- Rigoberto Calderón (born 1970), Nicaraguan track and field athlete and javelin thrower
- Rigoberto Chang Castillo (born 1950), Honduran lawyer and politician
- Rigoberto Cisneros (born 1953), Mexican football defender
- Rigoberto Corredor Bermúdez (born 1948), Colombian Catholic priest
- Rigoberto Cruz (died 1967), Nicaraguan co-founder of the Sandinista National Liberation Front, known as Pablo Ubeda
- Rigoberto Fontao Meza (1900–1936), Paraguayan poet
- Rigoberto Fontt (born 1925), Chilean sports shooter
- Rigoberto Garibaldi (born 1956), Panamanian boxer
- Rigoberto Gómez (born 1977), Honduran-Guatemalan football midfielder
- Rigoberto Gómez (Honduran footballer, born 1944), Honduran footballer known as "Shula"
- Rigoberto González (born 1970), American writer and book critic
- Rigoberto González González, Mexican politician
- Rigoberto Guzmán (1932–2014), Salvadoran football player and manager
- Rigoberto Hernandez (born 1967), American chemist and academic
- Rigoberto López, Haitian filmmaker and artist
- Rigoberto López Pérez (1929–1956), Nicaraguan poet, artist, composer, and assassin of dictator Anastasio Somoza García
- Rigoberto Mendoza (disambiguation), several people
- Rigoberto Ochoa Zaragoza (born 1935), Mexican politician
- Rigoberto Padilla (born 1985), Honduran footballer
- Rigoberto Paredes (1948–2015), Honduran poet, essayist, and publisher
- Rigoberto Pérez (born 1912), Mexican pole vaulter
- Rigoberto Perezcano, Mexican director and screenwriter
- Rigoberto Riasco (1953-2022), Panamanian professional boxer also known as "Little Poison"
- Rigoberto Rivas (born 1998), Honduran football midfielder
- Rigoberto Rivero (born 1914), Venezuelan sports shooter
- Rigoberto Rojas Suárez (1917–2001), Bolivian singer, musician and composer, better known as Tarateño Rojas
- Rigoberto Romero Carmona (1940–1991), Cuban photographer
- Rigoberto Salazar (born 1954), Cuban decathlete
- Rigoberto Salgado Vázquez (born 1969), Mexican economist politician
- Rigoberto Sanchez (born 1994), American football punter
- Rigoberto Soler (1896–1968), Spanish post-Impressionist painter
- Rigoberto Tiglao (born 1952), Filipino diplomat and writer
- Rigoberto Torres (born 1960), Puerto Rican sculptor
- Rigoberto Trujillo (born 1978), Cuban judoka
- Rigoberto Urán (born 1987), Colombian professional road racing cyclist

== See also ==
- Rigobert (name)
- Rigoberta Menchú (born 1959), K'iche' political and human rights activist from Guatemala
