= Juan Alonso Villabrille y Ron =

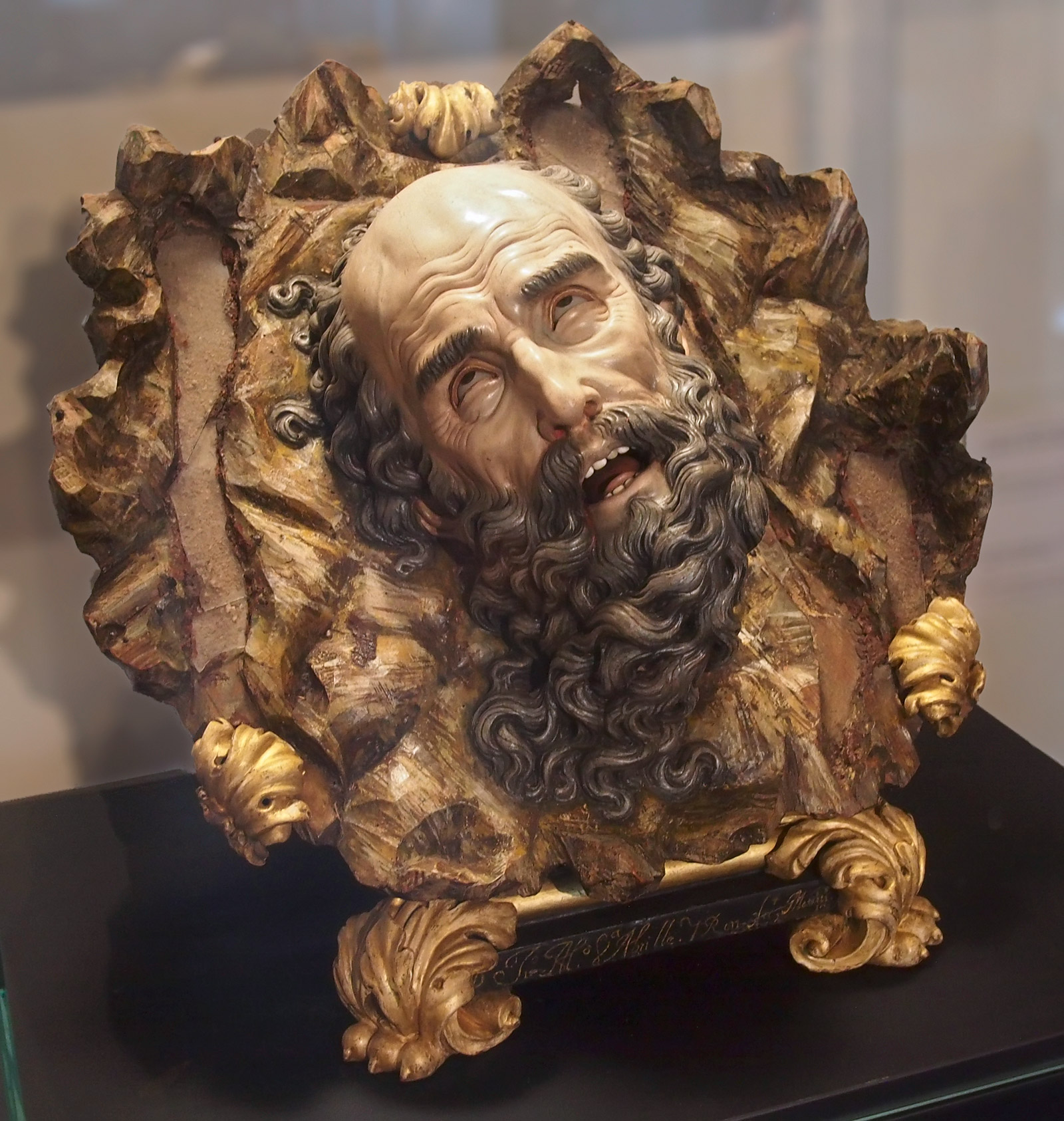
The Head of Saint Paul

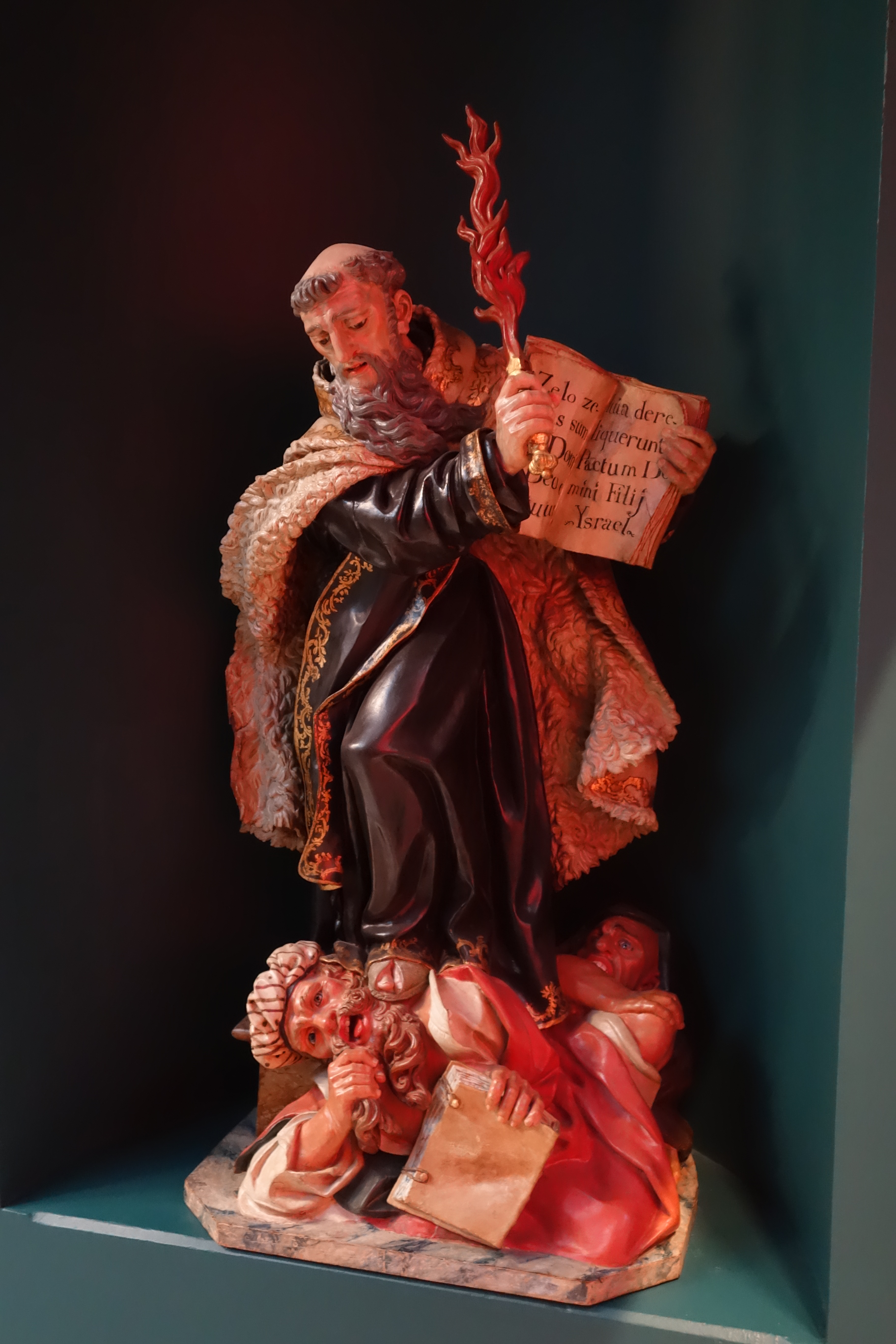
Saint Elijah (attributed)

Juan Alonso Villabrille y Ron (c. 1663, Pesoz - c. 1732, Madrid (?)) was a Spanish Baroque sculptor.

== Life and work ==
His only signed worked is a "Head of Saint Paul", dated 1707. From his will, it is known that he was married twice and had three children; Juan, Antonia, who married the sculptor, José Galbán, and Tomás, who became a Jesuit priest. There is also a confirmation of his place of birth and a claim to noble ancestry.

He settled in Madrid in 1686, living in the Church of San Ginés, where a bust of Saint Jerome, comparable to the Saint Paul, is very likely his work. He was apparently working as an independent sculptor by 1687, when he accepted an apprentice named Jerónimo de Soto, about whom nothing is known.

In 1718, he did a Saint John the Baptist for the altarpiece at Badajoz Cathedral and, in 1723, some stone sculptures for the Bridge of Toledo, which were minor works of a decorative nature. Three years later, he was involved in creating statues depicting Fernando III of Castile victorious over the Moors; in collaboration with the architect, Pedro de Ribera, who was in charge of works for the bridge. A "Holy Family" in the National Museum of Sculpture, Valladolid, and a Saint Elijah in the National Gallery of Ireland have been attributed to him.

Of less certain attribution are some figures in the "Chapel of the Good Death" at the Iglesia de San Miguel y San Julián in Valladolid, and others in the chapel of the Illustrious Brotherhood of the Holy Cross of the Redeemer and the Immaculate Conception, his Mother in Salamanca.

He may have had a brother, Pablo, who was also a sculptor, based on a signature on the statue of Saint Augustine in the Royal Monastery of La Encarnación, but nothing more is known.
