= Jesús Oviedo Herrera =

Mexican politician (born 1965)

- Born: 11 June 1965 (age 60); Guanajuato, Guanajuato, Mexico
- Occupation: Politician
- Political party: PAN

José de Jesús Oviedo Herrera (born 11 June 1965) is a Mexican politician affiliated with the National Action Party (PAN). In the 2012 general election, he was elected to the Chamber of Deputies to represent Guanajuato's 13th district during the 62nd session of Congress.
