= Rigobert (name) =

Rigobert is a masculine given name.

== People with the name ==
- Rigobert (died 743), saint and Benedictine monk
- Rigobert Roger Andely (born 1953), central banker from the Republic of the Congo
- Rigobert Bonne (1727–1794), French cartographer
- Rigobert Gruber (born 1961), German footballer
- Rigobert Massamba, Air Force major general in the Democratic Republic of the Congo
- Rigobert Ngouolali, politician from the Republic of the Congo
- Rigobert Onkassa Edhouba, Gabonese politician
- Rigobert Song (born 1976), Cameroonian footballer and football coach

== See also ==
- Rigoberto (name)
- Rigoberta Menchú (born 1959), K'iche' political and human rights activist from Guatemala
