= Diego de Saavedra Fajardo =

Spanish diplomat and man of letters

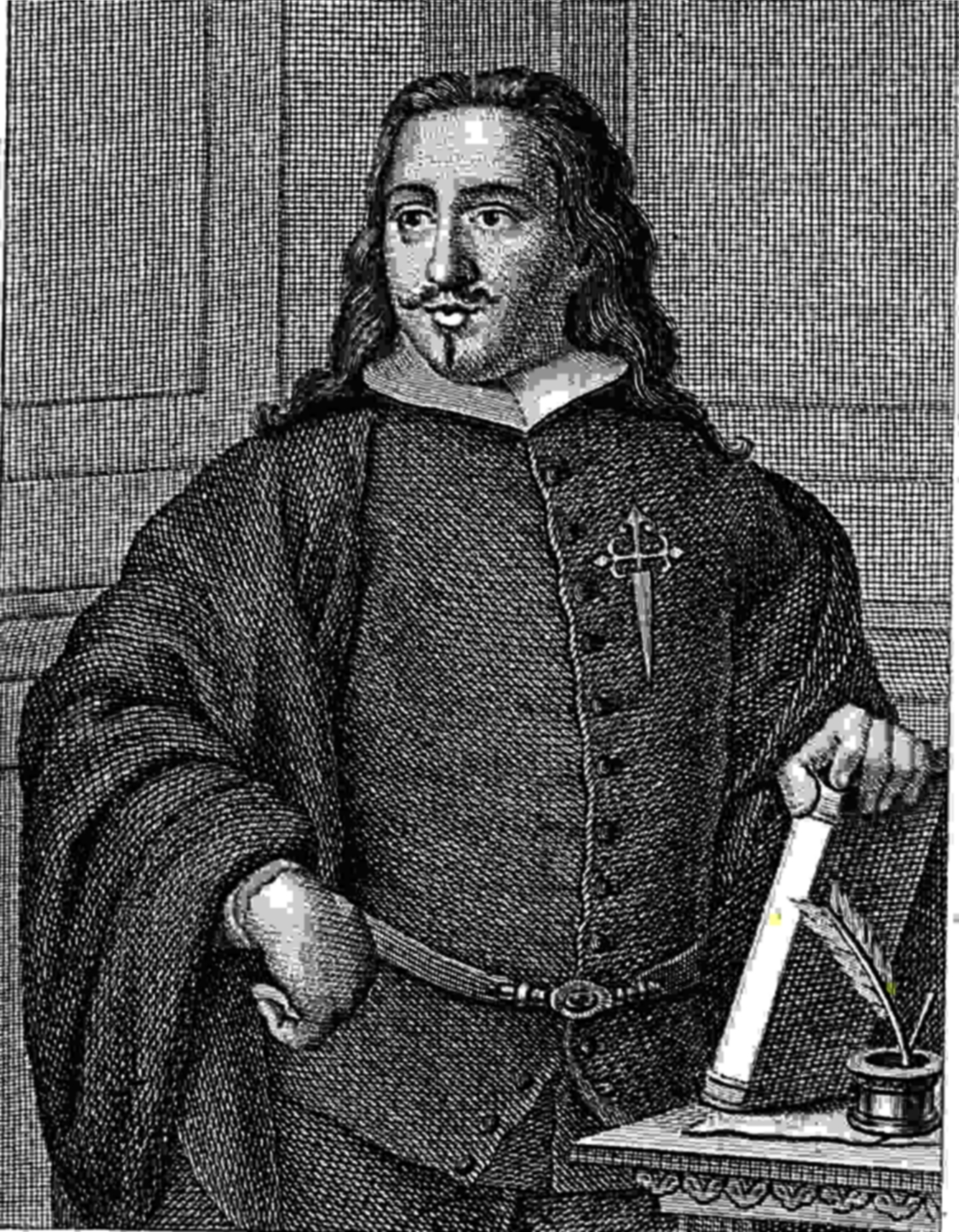
Portrait of Diego Saavedra Fajardo, by Fernando Selma

Diego de Saavedra Fajardo (6 May 1584 – 24 August 1648) was a Spanish diplomat and man of letters.

== Biography ==
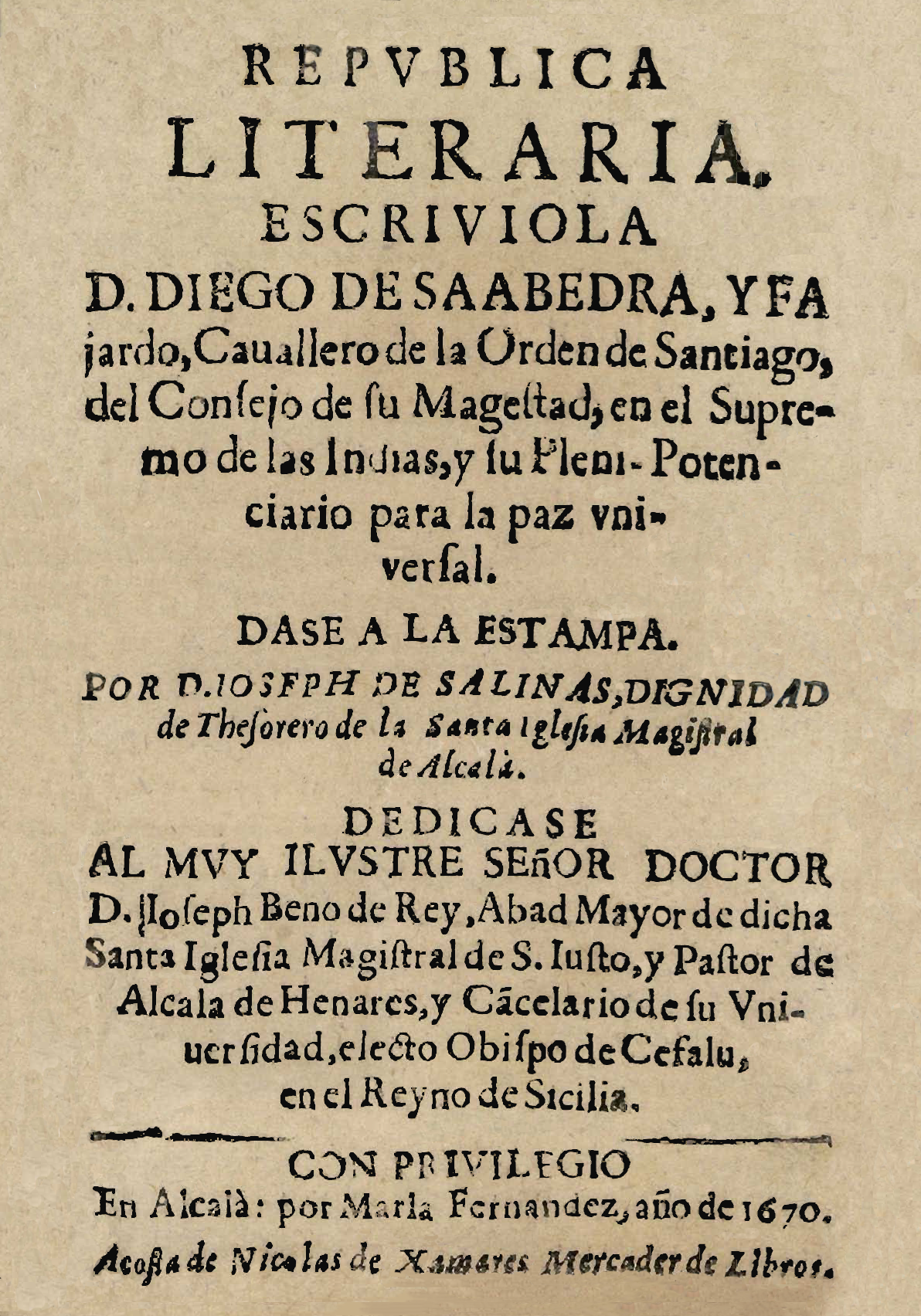
República literaria (Alcalá de Henares, 1670).

He was born in Algezares, in what is now the province of Murcia.

After receiving a religious education at Salamanca, he took minor orders, and in 1606 was appointed secretary to Cardinal Gaspar de Borja y Velasco, the Spanish ambassador at Rome.

Although he did not get to receive major orders, he was named canon of Santiago in 1617, which was worth the importunations to him of town hall, since he never attended its position; but he did on the contrary to conclaves who chose the Popes Pope Gregory XV (1621) and Urban VIII (1623). From this date its diplomatic activity did not know rest, because the confidence he had gained of Philip IV of Spain and he was in charge to manage a very important part of his political and diplomatic relations during twenty-five years in Italy, Germany and Switzerland, during the decline of the Spanish political power in Europe.

He was ambassador in Rome (1631) and marched to Bavaria in 1633, territory then at the center of the bloodiest fights of Thirty Years' War. Here, with the position of resident ambassador in the court of Maximilian I, Elector of Bavaria, leader of the Holy League, he pursued the union of the pro-Habsburg forces with the German Emperor Ferdinand II and with Catholic powers. In this year, the king Gustavus Adolphus of Sweden died in the battle of Lützen; this settled down a tense calm only interrupted by the murder of the marshal Wallenstein, head of the armies of Ferdinand II, when his alleged treason in favor of Sweden was discovered (no treason on the part of Wallenstein has ever been proven. This is pure speculation) .

In 1634, the battle of Nördlingen took place between the Swedish armies and those of the German empire supported by Spanish troops, the latter being victorious. In 1636, Emperor Ferdinand II died, and Diet of Regensburg took place for the election of his successor, where Saavedra went as representative of Spain. His diplomatic activity intensified when Richelieu declared war to Spain in 1635, and with the successive defeats of the Spanish troops by the French armies. Ultimately he became Spanish plenipotentiary at Regensburg in 1636 and at Münster in 1648.

After the signing of the Treaty of Münster, Saavedra retired into the Madrid convent of the Agustinos Recoletos. Here he died in 1648. He is buried at the Cathedral Church of Saint Mary in Murcia.

== Works ==
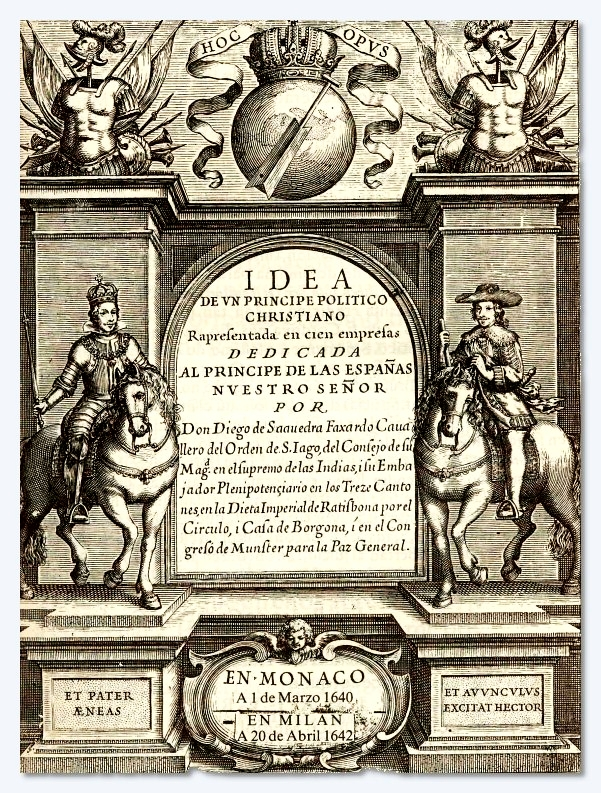
The Idea of a Christian political prince.

In 1640, Saavedra published the anti-Machiavellian emblem book Empresas Políticas. Idea de un príncipe político cristiano ("Political Maxims. Idea of a Christian Political Prince"), a hundred short essays about the education of a prince. This work was written primarily for the son of King Philip IV. It passed through a number of editions and was translated in several languages. An unfinished historical work, entitled Corona gótica, castellana, y austriaca políticamente ilustrada, appeared in 1646. Another work ascribed to Saavedra, the República literaria, was published posthumously in 1670; it is a satirical discussion on some of the leading characters in the ancient and modern world of letters. Saavedra's Idea de un príncipe político cristiano ("The Idea of a Christian political prince", 1640) was a very erudite work that uses the literary sort of emblem, put by Andrea Alciato with his Emblemata translated in 1549 and that has a mainly moral and philosophical character. His work, however, was mainly inspired by the Emblemata política (1618), by Jakob Bruck Angermunt, being the intention of the author to compose a guide for the suitable political formation of a Christian prince. As a historian wrote Corona gótica, castellana y austríaca (1648), that tried to be a biographical repertoire of the Visigothic kings of Spain.

== Legacy ==
A Spanish high school in the Infant Don Juan Manuel neighborhood of Murcia is named after Saavedra. In Algezares, his birthplace town, there is a school with his name. In addition, the main street of the town is also named after him.

Madrid has a street with his name in the 28011 postal code.
