= Fernando Selma =

Spanish engraver and illustrator

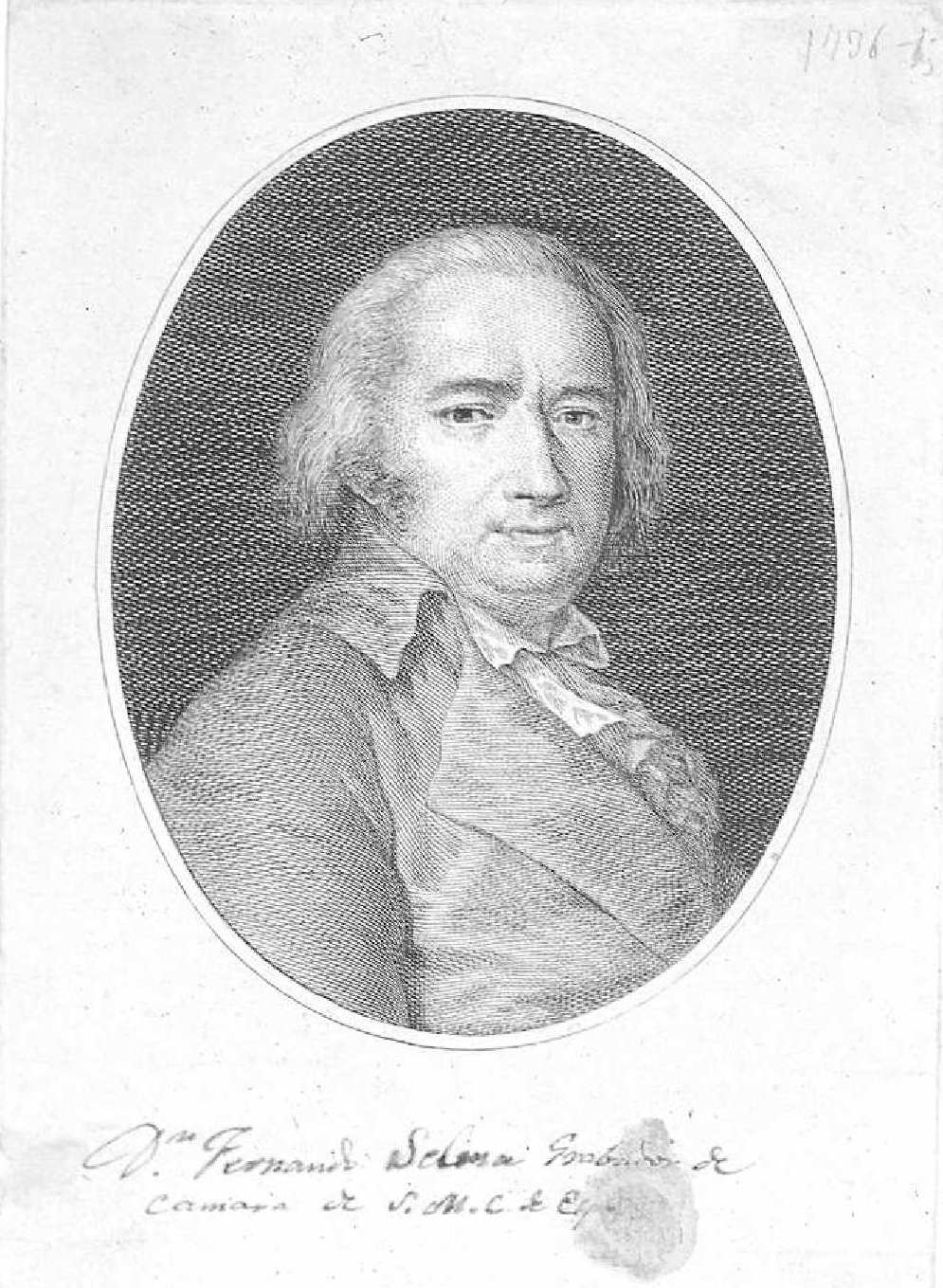
Fernando Selma, by an unknown artist

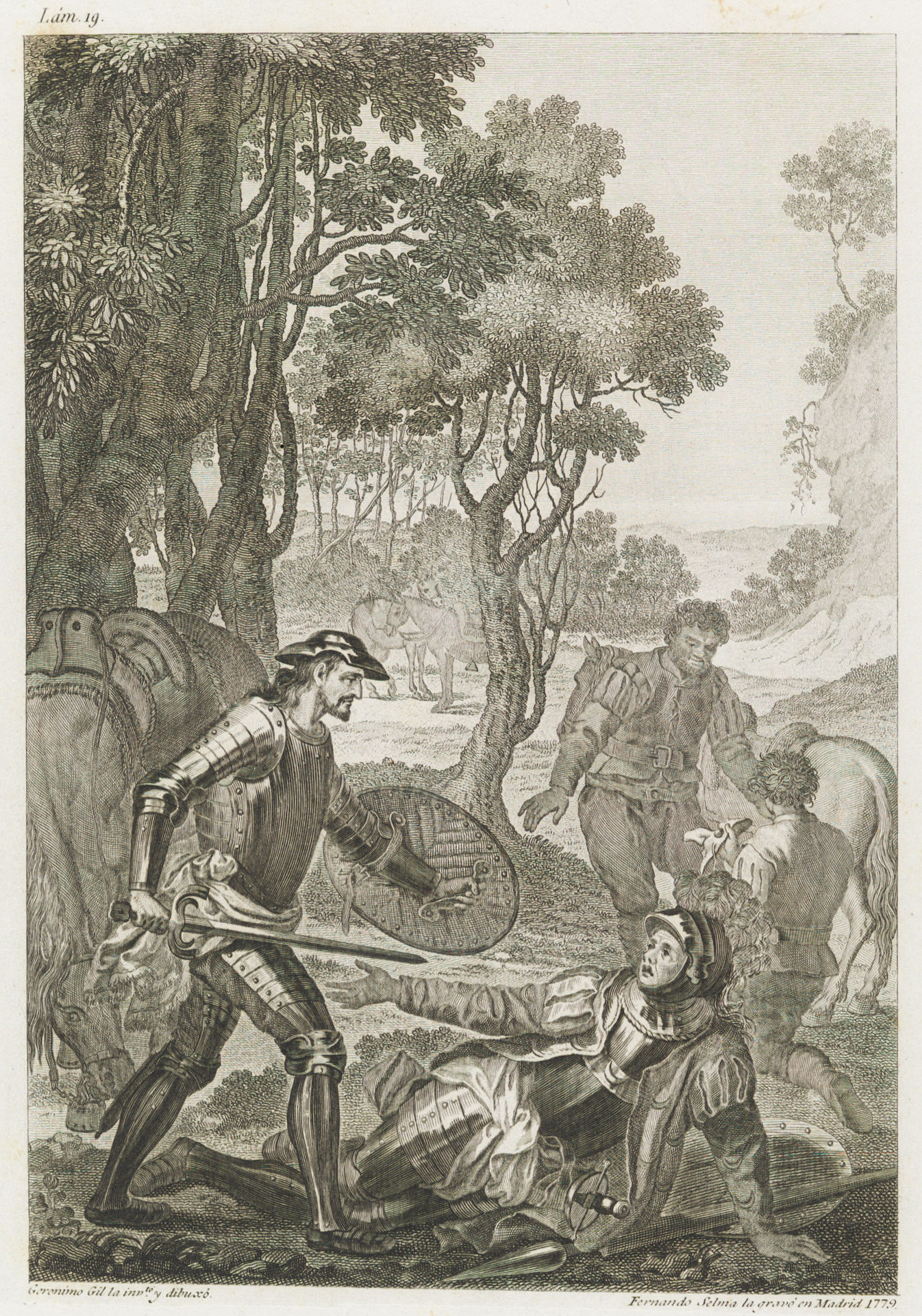
Don Quixote Defeating the Knight of the Mirrors

Fernando Selma (1752, Valencia - 8 January 1810, Madrid) was a Spanish engraver and illustrator.

== Life and works ==
He began his artistic studies with Ignacio Vergara at the Real Academia de Bellas Artes de San Carlos de Valencia. In 1768, he was granted a pension by King Charles IV to continue his studies at the Real Academia de Bellas Artes de San Fernando, where he attended the drawing classes of Francisco Bayeu and learned engraving from Manuel Salvador Carmona. Only one year later, he was awarded prizes from the Academia in both categories. He was named an Academician of Merit by the Academia of Valencia in 1780, and the Academia in Madrid in 1783.

His father-in-law, Jerónimo Antonio Gil, founder of the Academy of San Carlos in Mexico City, appointed him to be in charge of the engraving classes at that institution but, in 1786, just before his departure, he chose to remain in Madrid to attend to various projects at the Royal Printing Office.

As an expert in chalcography and intaglio, he participated in several ambitious editorial projects; notably the edition of Don Quixote, published by Joaquín Ibarra in 1780, under the patronage of the Royal Spanish Academy. He provided seven illustrations, the frontispiece for Part I, and some of the chapter and paragraph headings, after drawings by José del Castillo and Antonio Carnicero, among others. He also did illustrations for The Conspiracy of Catiline by Sallust (Ibarra, 1772).

For the Portraits of Illustrious Spaniards he provided the portraits of Lope de Vega (after a drawing by Rafael Ximeno y Planes), Miguel de Cervantes and Diego de Saavedra Fajardo. He also worked on the History of the Conquest of Mexico by Antonio de Solís, in the deluxe two volume edition published by Antonio de Sancha (1783-1784); providing the portrait of Hernán Cortés, from a drawing attributed to Titian. After 1786, he contributed to the Maritime Atlas of Spain. This resulted in his being criticized for abandoning historical works in favor of technical ones, to which he replied that he would rather provide images of practical use than ones to "delight the frivolous".

On behalf of the "Company for the Engraving of the King's Paintings", established in 1789, he reproduced works by Anthony van Dyck, Bartolomé Esteban Murillo and Guido Reni, among others. In 1799, he was named the Court Engraver by King Charles.
