= Juan Antonio Salvador Carmona =

Spanish engraver (1740–1805)

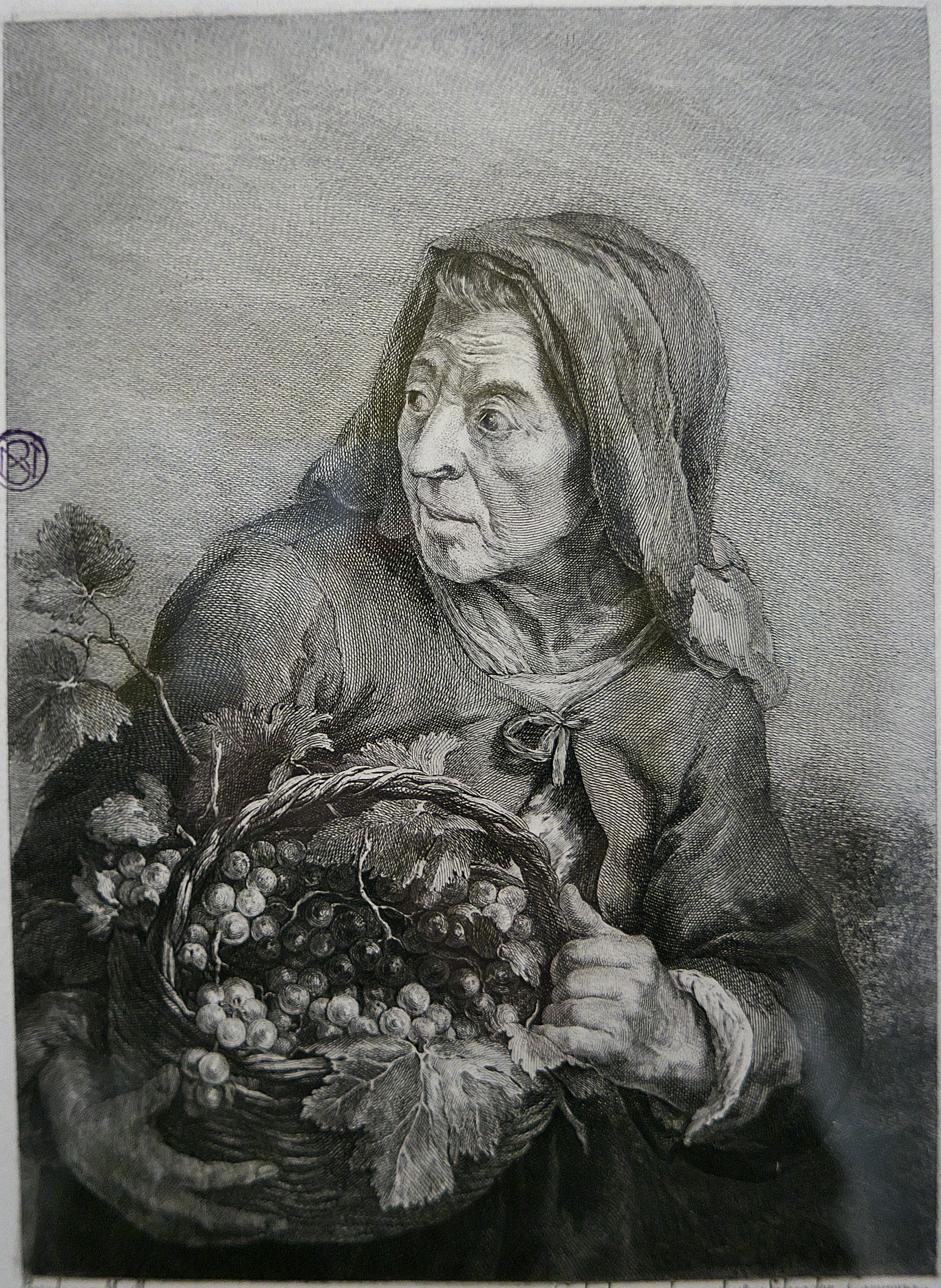
The Grape Harvester

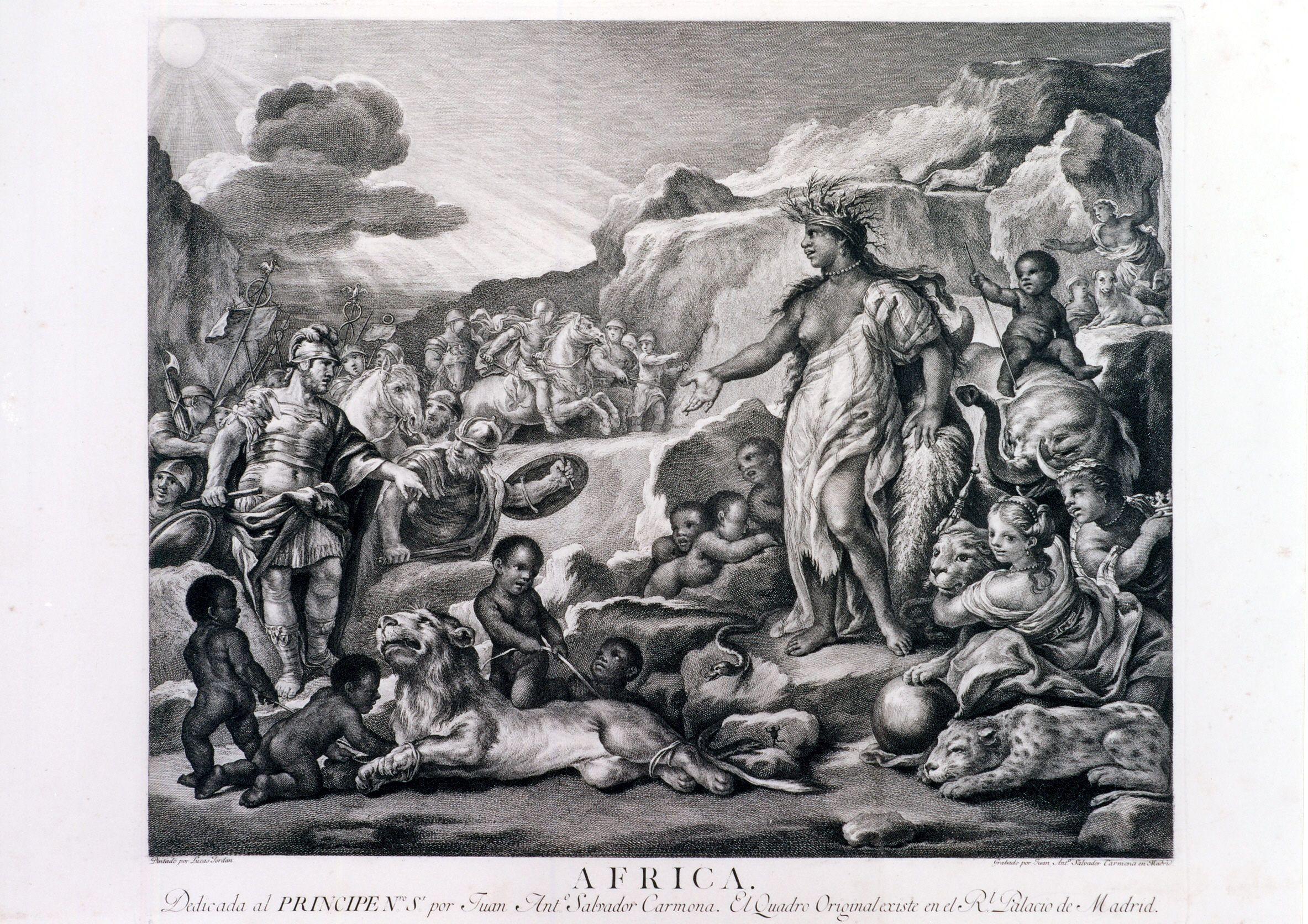
Africa

Juan Antonio Salvador Carmona (7 February 1740, in Nava del Rey – 20 January 1805 (?), in Madrid) was a Spanish engraver. His older brother, Manuel Salvador Carmona, was also an engraver and his eldest brother, José Salvador Carmona, was a sculptor.

== Life and work ==
He received his first lessons in Madrid from his brother, Manuel, who was studying with their uncle, the sculptor Luis Salvador Carmona. He initially planned to be a sculptor himself, and accompanied his uncle to the Royal Palace of La Granja de San Ildefonso, where they made plaster reliefs for the Pantheon there. In 1758, he applied for a scholarship at the Real Academia de Bellas Artes de San Fernando, but it was not approved, as he was already over the maximum age of sixteen.

He wanted to improve his engraving skills, but Manuel, who was on a scholarship in Paris, remained away longer than expected, so he obtained a position with Tomás López, a well-known map engraver, and studied with him for two years. When Manuel returned, in 1763, they began a lifelong artistic partnership.

In 1763, he participated in a competition at the Academia, but the award went to Juan Barcelón. The following year, he began accepting commissions. After establishing his reputation, he once again presented his works at the Academia in 1770 and was named a "Supernumerary Academician" for his engravings of works by Bartolomé Esteban Murillo, which are now on display at the Calcografía Nacional.

He produced many illustrations for printers. In 1772, he created some for a popular edition of The Conspiracy of Catiline, translated by the Infante, Sebastián Gabriel de Borbón, and published by Joaquín Ibarra. Among his later engravings were portraits of King Charles IV, when he was still a prince, and his consort, Maria Luisa of Parma. He also executed an engraving of Charles, that was based on an equestrian carving made of ivory, and an "Allegory on Spain", based on a design by Luis Paret. This was followed by a series of 41 plates depicting Apostles and Fathers of the Church. An allegorical set of the Four Continents, after Luca Giordano, was dedicated to Prince Charles. As a result, when Charles ascended to the throne in 1788, Juan Antonio was named "Court Engraver".

A curious autobiography (Noticias de la vida...hasta aquí) dates from 1795. Little else dates from these later years. His last known work, from 1802, is an engraving of Saint Lawrence, dedicated to the Marqués de Ariza, the King's sommelier. A personnel file at the Royal Palace gives his year of death as 1804, but the historian, Manuel Ossorio y Bernard, confidently sets it in January the following year, shortly before his family sold 107 items from his estate to the Calcografía Nacional at the Academia.

== Sources ==
- Moñino, A. and Lord E. A. (1952). "Juan Antonio Salvador Carmona. Grabador del siglo XVIII. (1740-1805". In Boletín de la Sociedad Española de Excursiones. Arte, Arqueología e Historia. Year LVI. Madrid: Hauser y Menet, pp. 47-86
- Biography, archived from tiendaciec.com
