= Miguel Luna Hernández =

Mexican politician (1953–2017)

- Born: 6 September 1953; Guanajuato, Mexico
- Died: 10 July 2017 (aged 63)
- Occupation: Politician
- Political party: PRD

José Miguel Luna Hernández (6 September 1953 – 10 July 2017 was a Mexican politician affiliated with the Party of the Democratic Revolution (PRD). In the 2003 mid-terms, he was elected to the Chamber of Deputies to represent Guanajuato's 13th district during the 59th session of Congress.

He died on 10 July 2017.
