= José Gómez de Navia =

Spanish engraver and draftsman

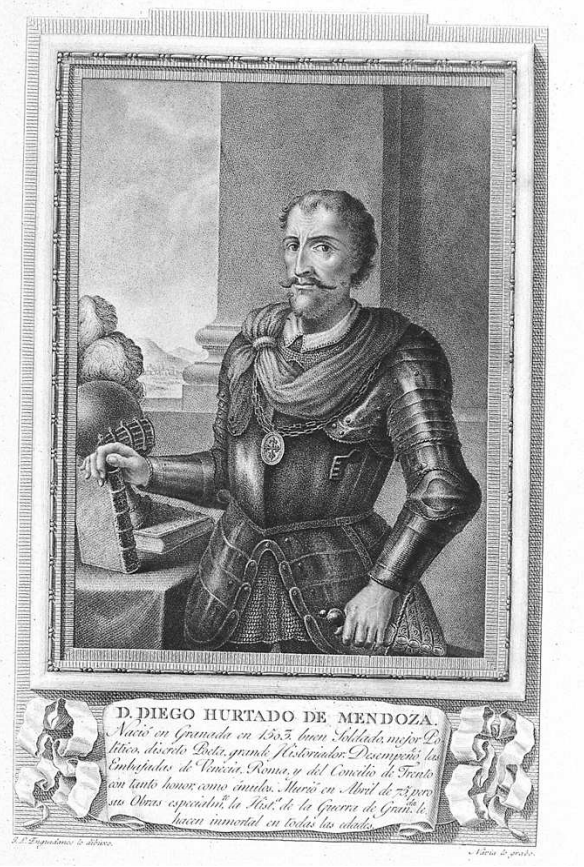
Portrait of Diego Hurtado de Mendoza, after José López Enguídanos

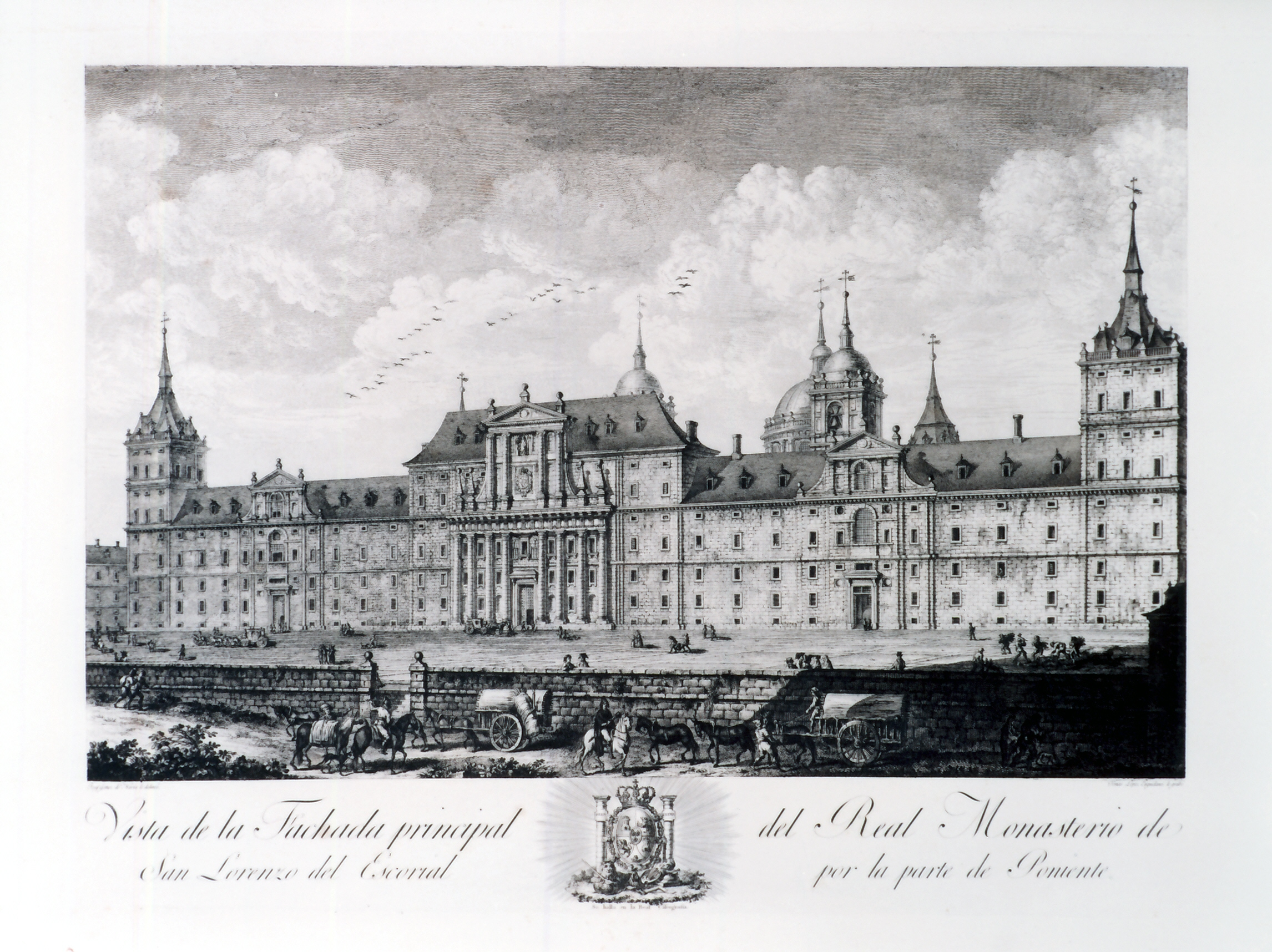
El Escorial, main façade

José Gómez de Navia (1757, in San Ildefonso – after 1812, in Madrid) was a Spanish engraver and draftsman.

== Life and works ==
He began his studies with Manuel Salvador Carmona at the Real Academia de Bellas Artes de San Fernando and won a prize for engraving in 1784. On numerous occasions, he collaborated on projects to illustrate the scientific publications of the Imprenta Real (Royal Printing Office), such as Elements of Theoretical and Experimental Physics, by the French physicist Joseph-Aignan Sigaud de Lafond (1787), The Ten Books of Architecture, by Vitruvius, translated by Joseph Ortiz y Sanz (1787), Physical-chemical Elements of General Water Analysis by Torbern Bergman (1794), and New Inquiries About Kneecap Fractures and the Diseases that are Related to it, by the Catalonian physician Leonardo Galli (1795).

He tried several new methods of engraving, and introduced the technique known as "stippling", which he used in his Collection of Devout Heads, Taken from Paintings by Famous Artists (1794), and in his portrait of Diego Hurtado de Mendoza in the Portraits of Illustrious Spaniards.

His culminating work is the Collection of Different Views of the Magnificent Temple and Royal Monastery of San Lorenzo de El Escorial, Factory of the Catholic and Prudent King Felipe II, built by the Distinguished Architects Juan Bautista de Toledo and Juan de Herrera his Disciple , which he undertook on his own initiative. In a letter addressed to the Academia in 1800, he noted that he was short of work and, pursuing his fondness for drawing, spent the summer sketching at El Escorial. King Charles IV was so pleased with them, he commissioned more, depicting Aranjuez, and provided an annual pension of 300 ducats. Possibly due to failing eyesight or other health issues, the actual engravings were executed by Tomás López Enguídanos and Manuel Alegre.

Similar projects followed, with the engravings done by Alegre, Esteban Boix and Alonso García Sanz (c. 1781-c. 1819). His last known work was a series entitled Collection of the Best Views and Most Sumptuous Buildings in Madrid (1812).
