= Rubén Arellano =

Mexican politician

- Born: 25 March 1947 (age 79); Guanajuato, Mexico
- Occupation: Politician
- Political party: PAN

Rubén Arellano Rodríguez (born 25 March 1947) is a Mexican politician from the National Action Party (PAN). In the 2009 mid-terms, he was elected to the Chamber of Deputies to represent Guanajuato's 13th district during the 61st session of Congress.
