= José María Anaya Ochoa =

Mexican politician (born 1957)

- Born: 19 July 1957 (age 68); Valle de Santiago, Guanajuato, Mexico
- Occupation: Politician
- Political party: PAN

José María Anaya Ochoa (born 19 July 1957) is a Mexican politician from the National Action Party (PAN). In the 2000 general election, he was elected to the Chamber of Deputies to represent Guanajuato's 13th district during the 57th session of Congress.
