= Ramón Lemus Muñoz Ledo =

Mexican politician (born 1954)

- Born: 4 April 1954 (age 72); Guanajuato, Mexico
- Occupation: Politician
- Political party: PAN

Ramón Ignacio Lemus Muñoz Ledo (Note: In this Spanish name, the first or paternal surname is Lemus and the second or maternal family name is Muñoz Ledo.) (born 4 April 1954) is a Mexican politician affiliated with the National Action Party (PAN). In the 2006 general election, he was elected to the Chamber of Deputies to represent Guanajuato's 13th district during the 60th session of Congress.
