= Fountain of Fame (Madrid) =

Monumental fountain in Madrid

- Spanish: Fuente de la Fama
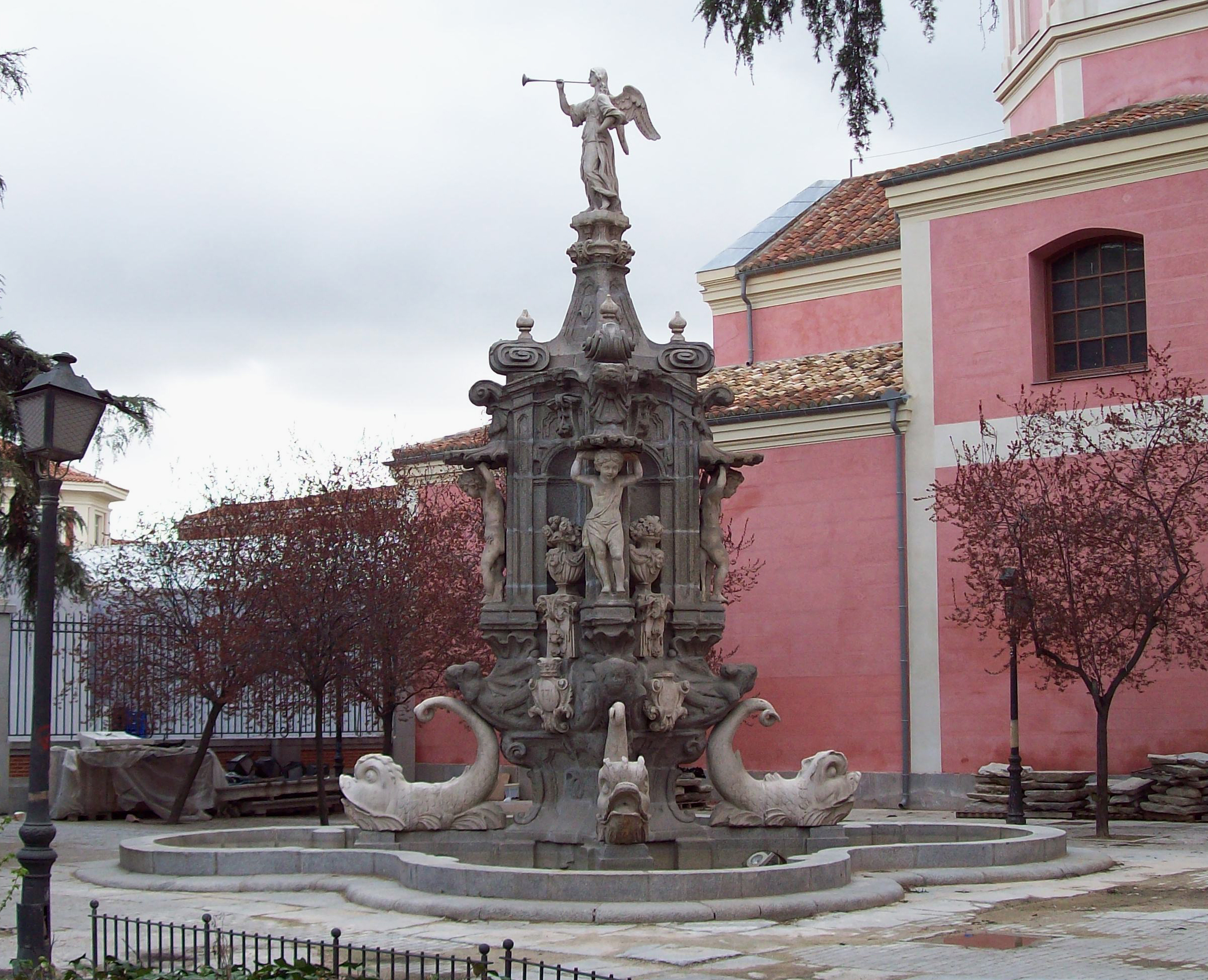
- Artist: Pedro de Ribera
- Completion date: 1732
- Medium: Limestone and granite
- Movement: Baroque
- Location: Jardines del Arquitecto Ribera, Madrid, Spain
- 40.426108°N 3.70057°W

The Fountain of Fame (Spanish: Fuente de la Fama) is a Baroque fountain located in Madrid, Spain.

== History and description ==
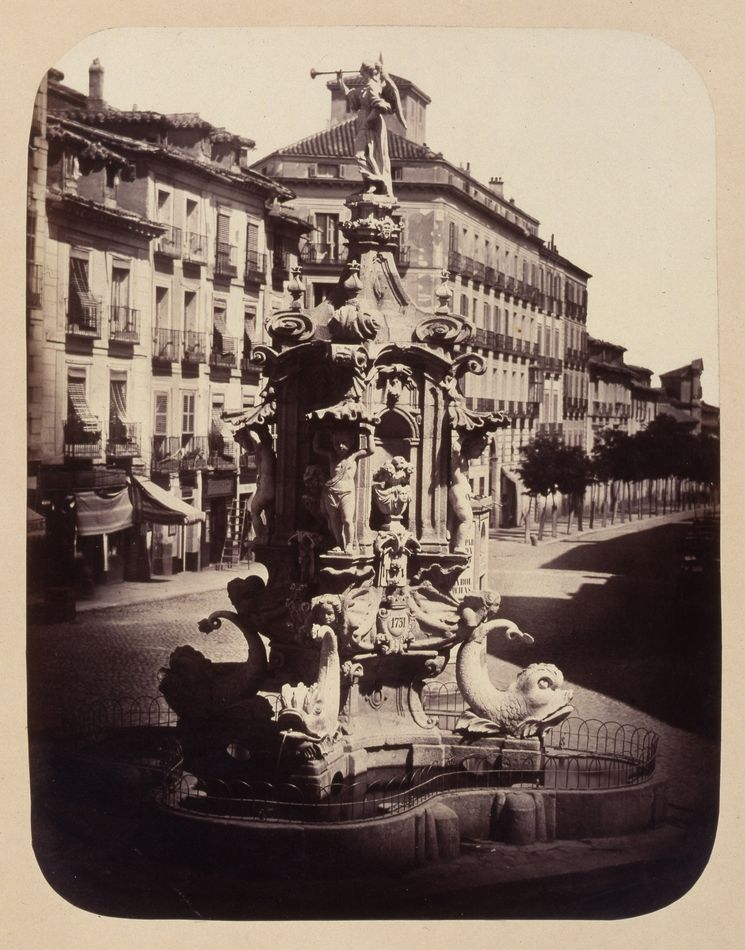
A 1864 photograph of the fountain by Alfonso Begué, then located at the Plaza de Antón Martín.

Commissioned during the reign of Philip V to Pedro de Ribera to be built at the Plaza de Antón Martín, the precise date for the beginning of the works is uncertain, although the process was already started by 1731. It was completed in 1732.

The ensemble presents a pylon shaped like a four-leaf clover. It features four dolphins as water fountains. The structure also incorporates other ornamental details such as angels holding seashells and niches with flowerpots. It is topped by the winged figure of Pheme, playing the trumpet.

It was torn down by 1880, and some of its parts were stored. In 1911, it was reconstructed by Ángel García in the Parque del Oeste, where it endured damage during the 1936–1939 Civil War. The fountain ended up in 1941 in a somewhat dull open space near the Museum of Municipal History, close to another Ribera's work, the Baroque frontispiece of the museum. As the fountain suffered several vandalic attacks, the surrounding space was enclosed by a fence in 1999.
