= 13th federal electoral district of Guanajuato =

Federal electoral district of Mexico

Guanajuato's 13th
- Electoral district of the Chamber of Deputies of Mexico

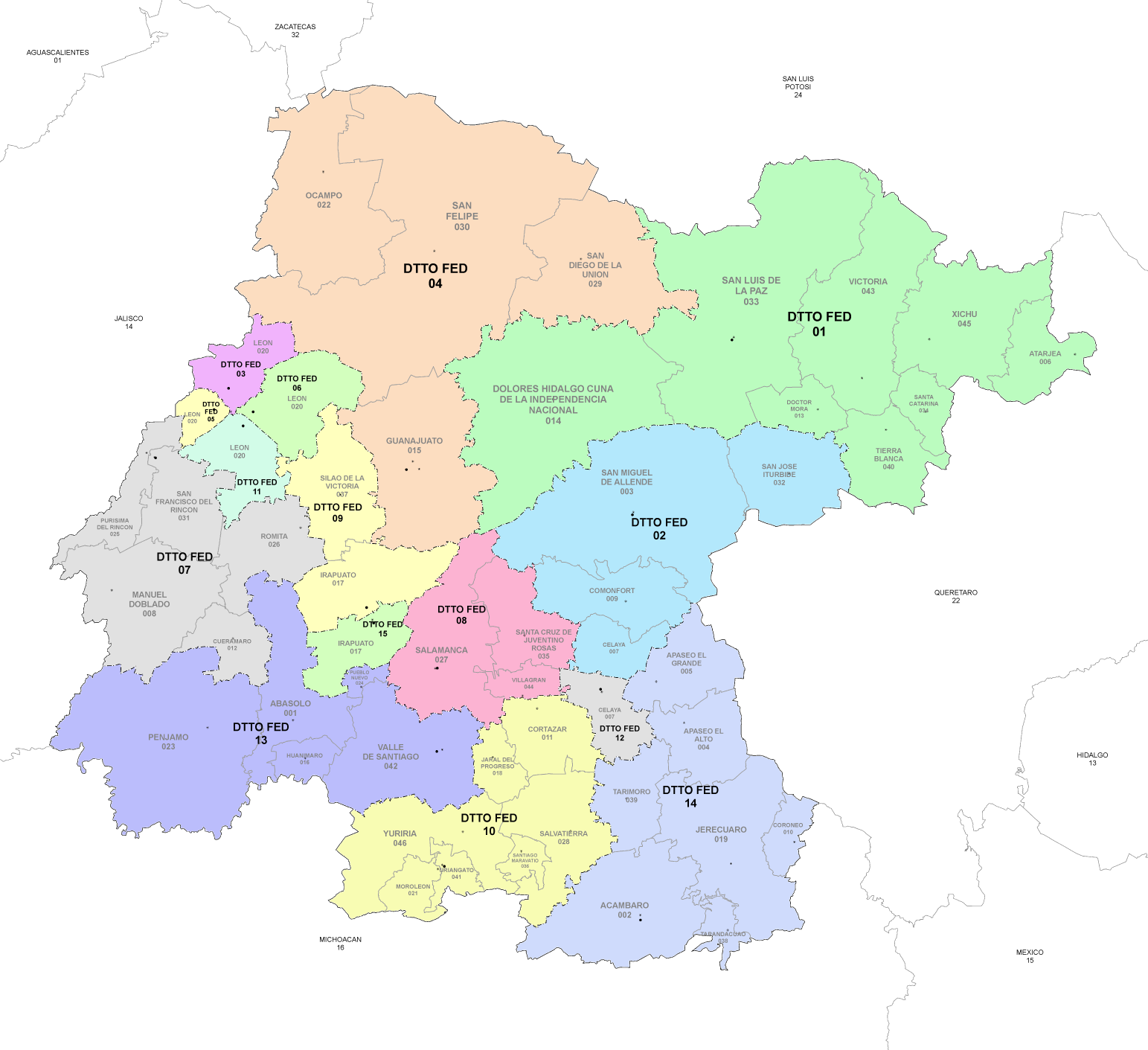
- 13th district since 2023

Incumbent
- Member: Lucero Higareda Segura
- Party: ▌Morena
- Congress: 66th (2024–2027)

District
- State: Guanajuato
- Head town: Valle de Santiago
- Coordinates: 20°23′N 101°11′W
- Covers: 5 municipalities: Abasolo, Huanímaro, Pénjamo, Pueblo Nuevo, Valle de Santiago
- PR region: Second
- Precincts: 260
- Population: 429,410 (2020 census)

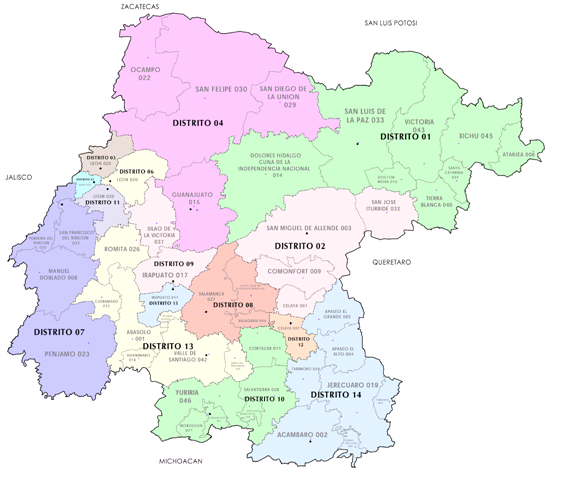
Guanajuato's districts in 2017–2022

The 13th federal electoral district of Guanajuato (Spanish: Distrito electoral federal 13 de Guanajuato) is one of the 300 electoral districts into which Mexico is divided for elections to the federal Chamber of Deputies and one of 15 such districts in the state of Guanajuato.

It elects one deputy to the lower house of Congress for each three-year legislative session by means of the first-past-the-post system. Votes cast in the district also count towards the calculation of proportional representation ("plurinominal") deputies elected from the second region.

Suspended in 1930, (Note: An amendment to Article 52 of the Constitution in 1928 changed the original provision of "one deputy per 60,000 inhabitants" to "one deputy per 100,000"; as a result, the size of the Chamber of Deputies fell from 281 in the 1928 election to 171 in 1934.) Guanajuato's 13th was re-established as part of the 1977 political reforms. The restored district returned its first deputy in the 1979 mid-term election.

The current member for the district, elected in the 2024 general election, is Lucero Higareda Segura of the National Regeneration Movement (Morena).

== District territory ==
Under the 2023 districting plan adopted by the National Electoral Institute (INE), which is to be used for the 2024, 2027 and 2030 federal elections, the 13th district covers the south-west of Guanajuato and comprises 260 electoral precincts (secciones electorales) across five of the state's 46 municipalities:

- Abasolo, Huanímaro, Pénjamo, Pueblo Nuevo and Valle de Santiago

The head town (cabecera distrital), where results from individual polling stations are gathered together and tallied, is the city of Valle de Santiago. The district reported a population of 429,410 in the 2020 census.

== Previous districting schemes ==
Evolution of electoral district numbers
	1974	1978	1996	2005	2017	2023
Guanajuato	9	13	15	14	15	15
Chamber of Deputies	196	300				

2017–2022

Between 2017 and 2022, the 13th district's head town was at Valle de Santiago and it covered seven municipalities:
- Abasolo, Huanímaro, Pueblo Nuevo and Valle de Santiago, as in the 2023 scheme, but without Pénjamo and instead including Cuerámaro, Jaral del Progreso and Romita.

2005–2017

Under the 2005 plan, Guanajuato had only 14 districts. This district's head town was at Valle de Santiago and it covered four municipalities:
- Jaral del Progreso, Valle de Santiago, Cortazar and 43 precincts in Celaya. (Note: In 2005–2017, the 12th district covered the remainder of Celaya.)

1996–2005

In the 1996 scheme, under which Guanajuato was assigned 15 seats, the district had its head town at Valle de Santiago and it comprised three municipalities:
- Cortazar, Jaral del Progreso and Valle de Santiago.

1978–1996

The districting scheme in force from 1978 to 1996 was the result of the 1977 electoral reforms, which increased the number of single-member seats in the Chamber of Deputies from 196 to 300. Under that plan, Guanajuato's seat allocation rose from 9 to 13. The new 13th district covered five municipalities:
- Cortazar and Jaral del Progreso, as in the later plans, plus Salvatierra, Tarimoro and Villagrán.

== Deputies returned to Congress ==
(Mexico) National parties
- Current
- PAN
- PRI
- PT
- PVEM
- MC
- Morena
- PAZ
- Somos
- Defunct or local only
- PLM
- PNR
- PRM
- PNM
- PP
- PPS
- PARM
- PFCRN
- CON
- PANAL
- PSD
- PES
- PES
- PRD

Guanajuato's 13th district
Election	Deputy	Party	Term	Legislature
1916	Fernando Lizardi		1916–1917	Constituent Congress of Querétaro
1917	José Siurob Ramírez		1917–1918	27th Congress
...
The 13th district was suspended between 1930 and 1979
1979	Enrique Betanzos Hernández	Institutional Revolutionary Party	1979–1982	51st Congress
1982	José Luis Caballero Cárdenas	Institutional Revolutionary Party	1982–1985	52nd Congress
1985	Juan Antonio Araujo Urcelay	Institutional Revolutionary Party	1985–1988	53rd Congress
1988	María del Carmen Moreno Contreras	Institutional Revolutionary Party	1988–1991	54th Congress
1991	Martín Santos Gómez	Institutional Revolutionary Party	1991–1994	55th Congress
1994	Martín Montaño Arteaga	Institutional Revolutionary Party	1994–1997	56th Congress
1997	Martín Contreras Rivera	National Action Party (Mexico)	1997–2000	57th Congress
2000	José María Anaya Ochoa	National Action Party (Mexico)	2000–2003	58th Congress
2003	J. Miguel Luna Hernández	Party of the Democratic Revolution	2003–2006	59th Congress
2006	Ramón Ignacio Lemus Muñoz Ledo	National Action Party (Mexico)	2006–2009	60th Congress
2009	Rubén Arellano Rodríguez	National Action Party (Mexico)	2009–2012	61st Congress
2012	José de Jesús Oviedo Herrera	National Action Party (Mexico)	2012–2015	62nd Congress
2015	Ariel Enrique Corona Rodríguez	National Action Party (Mexico)	2015–2018	63rd Congress
2018	Emmanuel Reyes Carmona (Note: Originally elected for the PRD, Reyes Carmona resigned from the party on 21 February 2019. He sat as an independent and subsequently joined the Morena bloc.)	Party of the Democratic Revolution Independent politician National Regeneration Movement	2018–2021	64th Congress
2021	Emmanuel Reyes Carmona	National Regeneration Movement	2021–2024	65th Congress
2024	Lucero Higareda Segura	National Regeneration Movement	2024–2027	66th Congress

== Presidential elections ==
Guanajuato's 13th district
Election	District won by	Party or coalition	%
2018	Andrés Manuel López Obrador	Juntos Haremos Historia	35.1820
2024	Claudia Sheinbaum Pardo	Sigamos Haciendo Historia	54.5576
