= Bridge of Toledo (Madrid) =

- Puente de Toledo (Spanish)
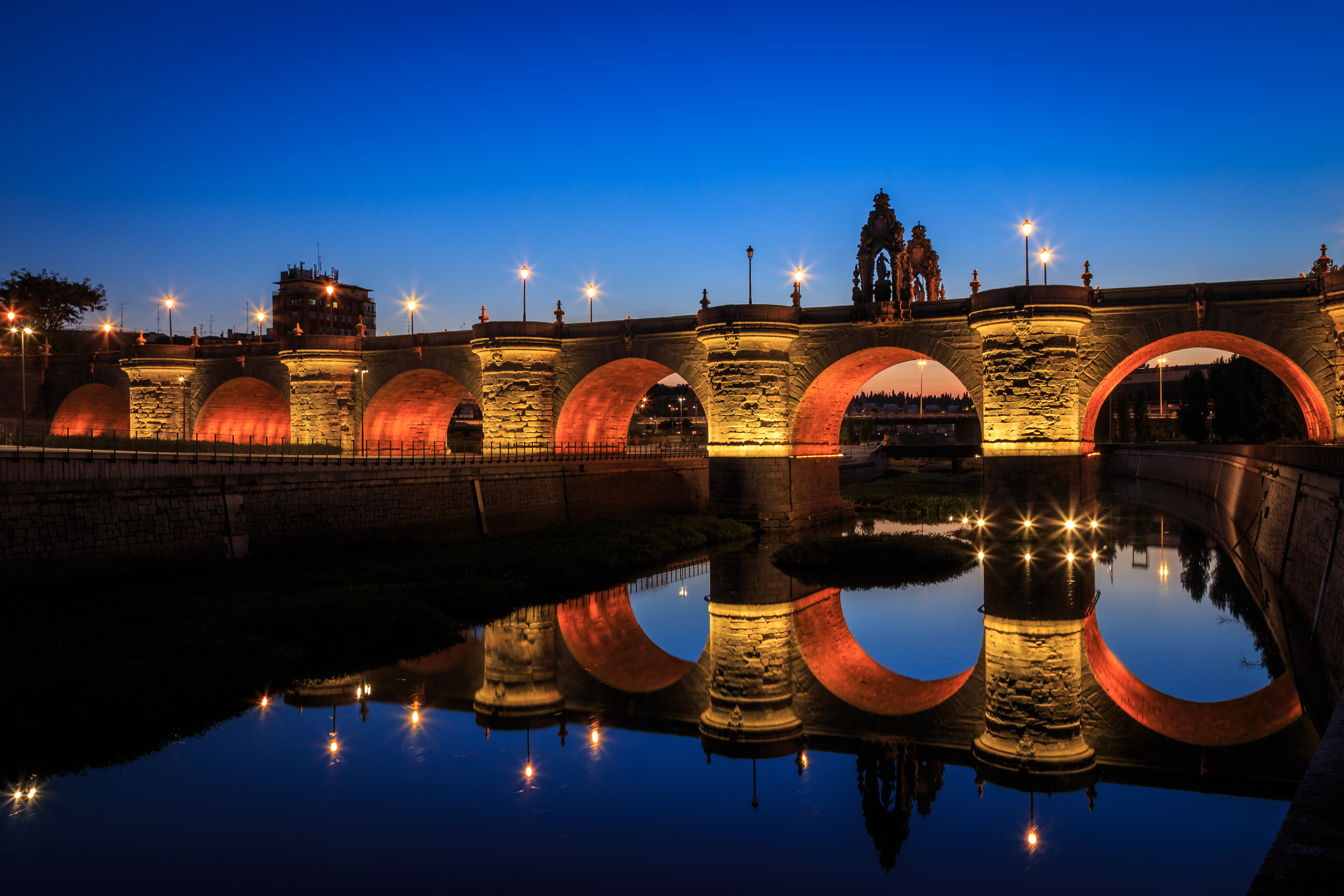
- The bridge of Toledo at night (2013)

- Location within Spain
- 40.399678°N 3.714941°W
- Location: Madrid, Spain

History
- Built: 1732

Site notes
- Architect: Pedro de Ribera
- Architectural style: Baroque

Spanish Cultural Heritage
- Official name: Puente de Toledo
- Type: Non-movable
- Criteria: Monument
- Designated: 1956
- Reference no.: RI-51-0001257

The Bridge of Toledo (Spanish: Puente de Toledo) is a bridge located in Madrid, Spain. It was built in a Baroque style between 1718 and 1732 by architect Pedro de Ribera and spans the Manzanares River, linking the Pyramids roundabout on the east bank with Marqués de Vadillo Square on the west bank.

It was declared Bien de Interés Cultural in 1956.

== Gallery ==
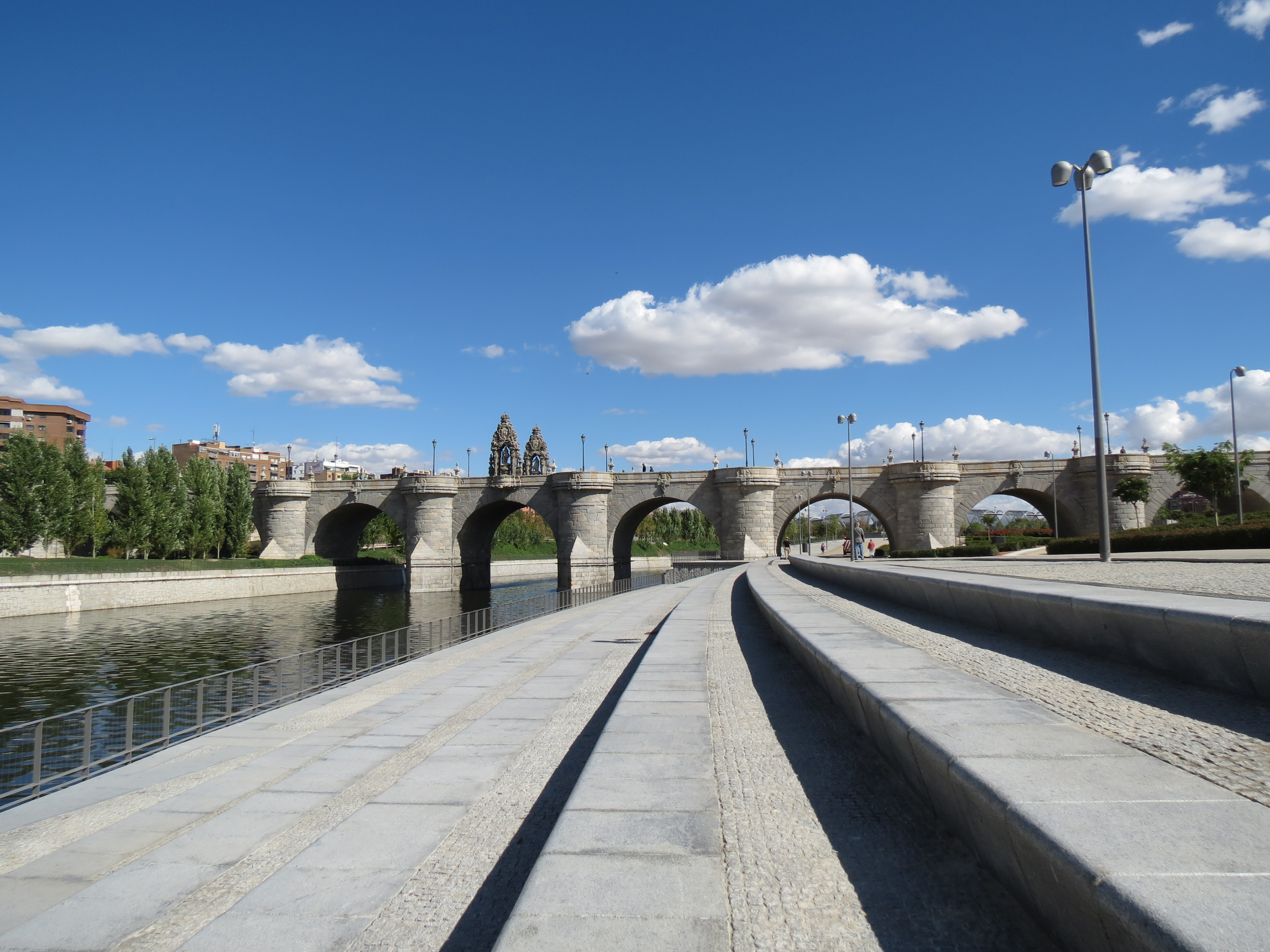

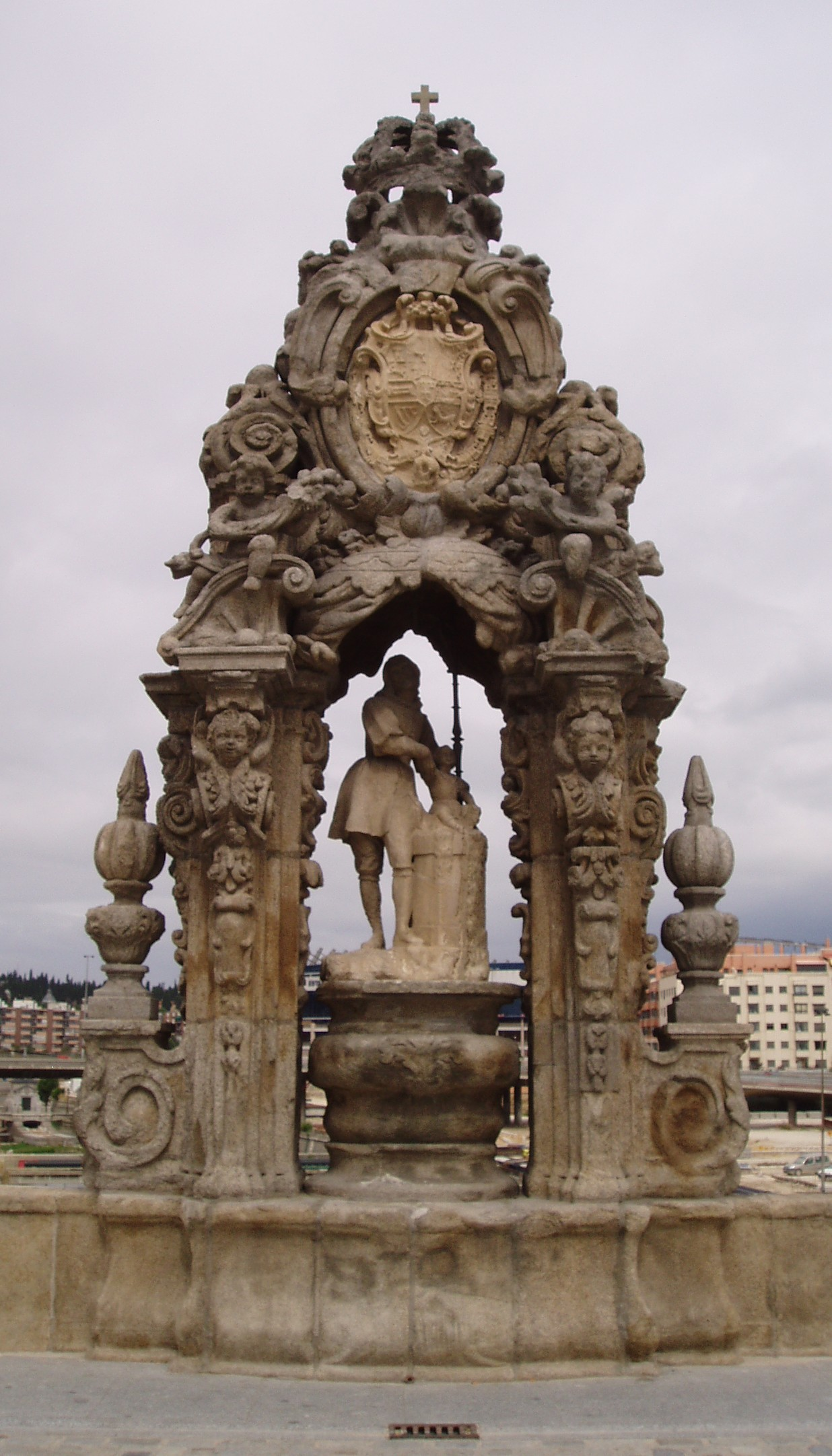
Statue of Isidore the Laborer

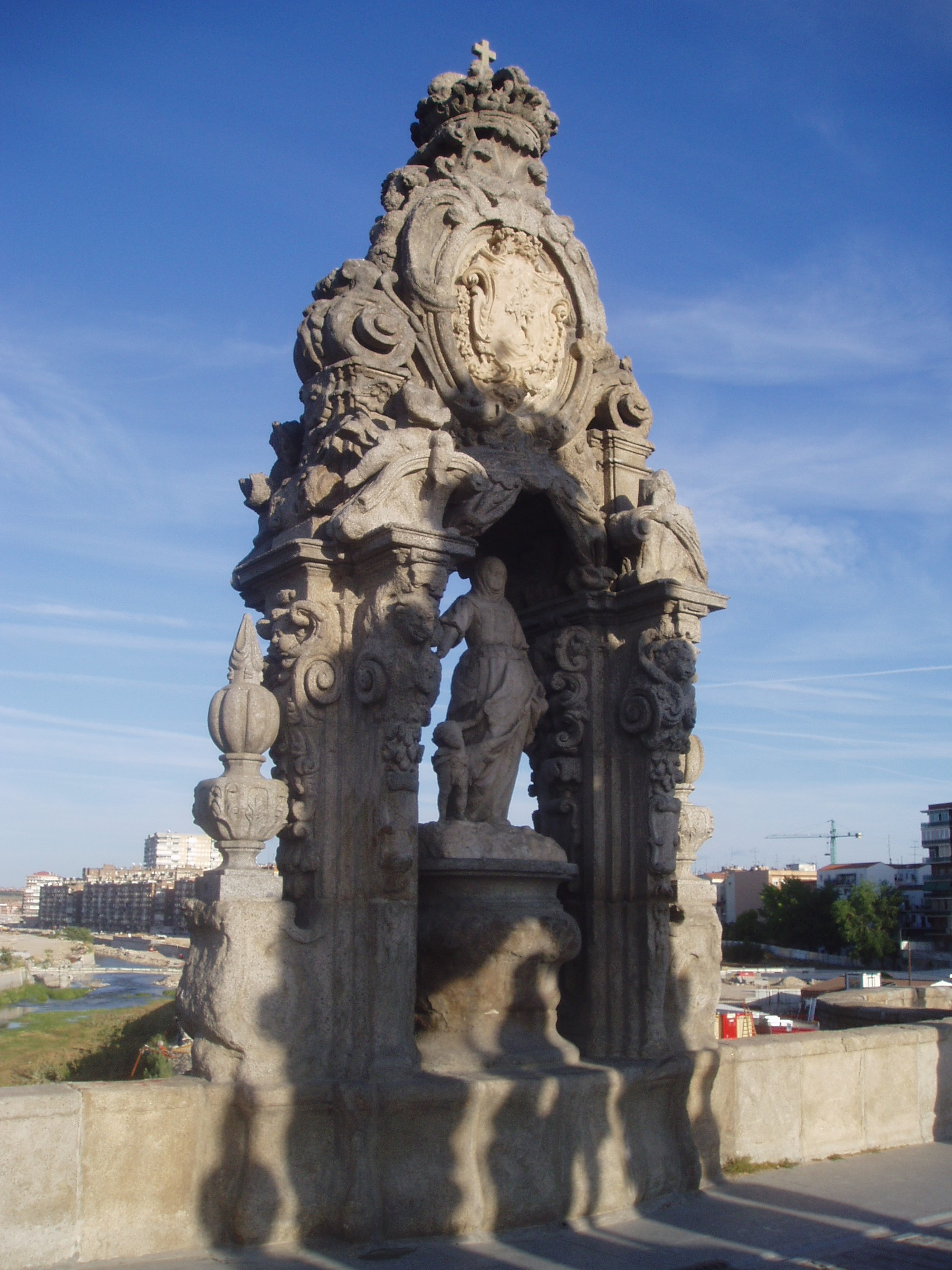
Statue of Maria Torribia
