= Teodoro de Almeida =

The Reverend Teodoro de Almeida Cong. Orat. FRS
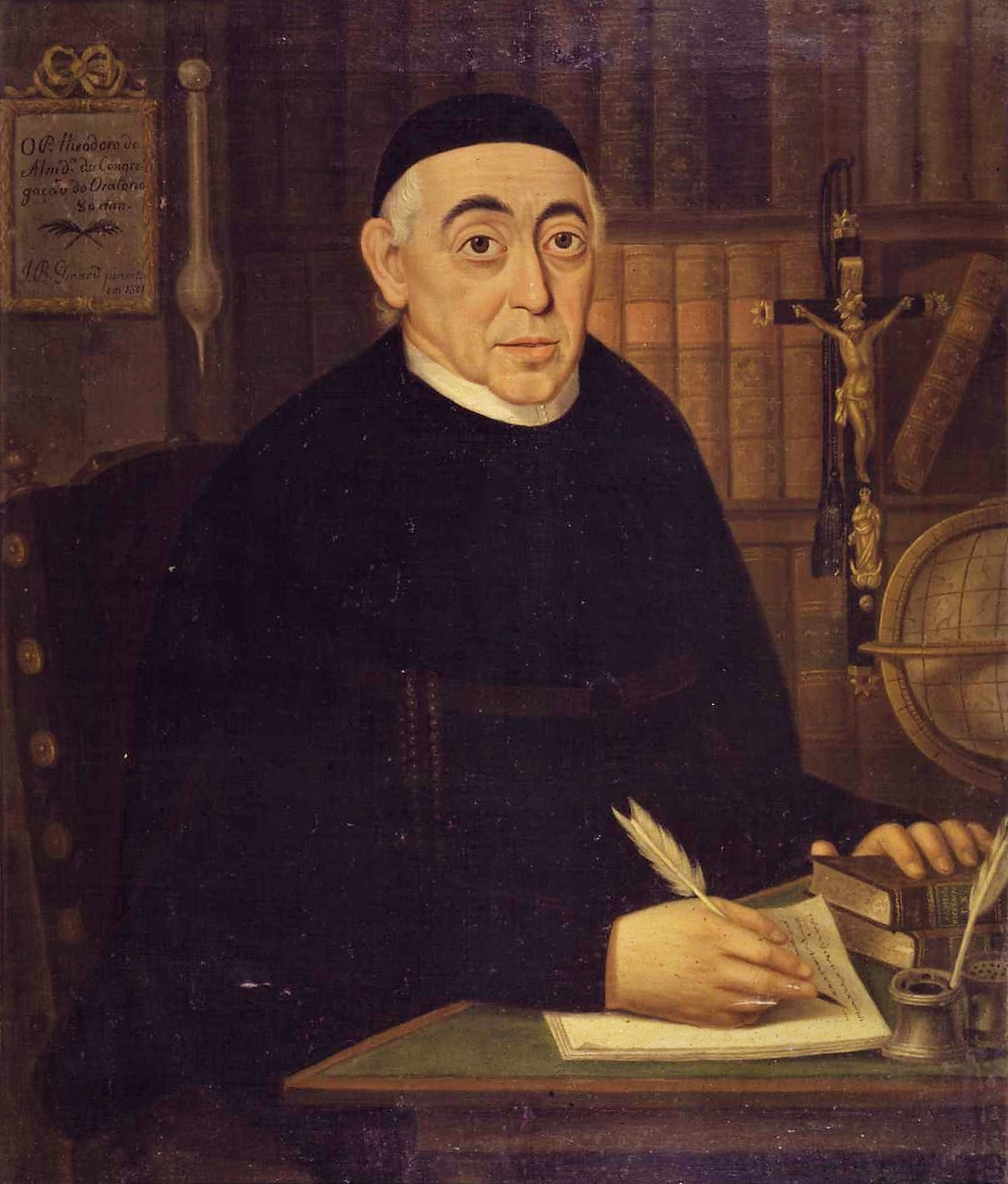
- Born: 7 January 1722; Lisbon, Portugal
- Died: 18 April 1804 (aged 82); Lisbon, Portugal
- Notable work: O Feliz Independente do Mundo e da Fortuna (1779)

Teodoro de Almeida C.O. FRS (7 January 1722 – 18 April 1804) was a Portuguese Catholic priest, member of the Congregation of the Oratory of Saint Philip Neri, a writer and philosopher, and a leading personage of the Portuguese Enlightenment.

Almeida is noted for his popularisation of the experimental sciences through his ten-volume Recreação Filosófica ou Diálogo sobre a Filosofia Natural ("Philosophical Recreation, or, a Dialogue on Natural Philosophy", published 1751–1799), written "not for those who are educated in deep learning, but for those that, by lack of books written in their mother tongue, live without instruction". His ideas on natural philosophy were marked by Enlightenment views on the use of reason and the scientific method, a theological understanding of nature (a sense of harmony between natural philosophy and religious orthodoxy), and a methodological eclecticism that opposed appeals to authority. He was elected Fellow of the Royal Society of London in 1758.

As a writer, Almeida was influenced by the literary currents of the Arcádia Lusitana in the mid-century, which stressed realism as well as the utility of poetry. He shared a concern about the melancholia of the Pre-Romantics with others like the Marquise of Alorna or Bocage, but his optimism derived from the knowledge gained from reason and religion. His O Feliz Independente do Mundo e da Fortuna ("The Happy Man, Independent of World and Fortune", published 1799), sought to show "with the demonstrative force of geometry and with poetic grace, the means to be happy in this world."

Because of his opposition to the enlightened despotic policies of the Marquis of Pombal, Almeida was banished to Porto in 1760 and from there to Spain in 1768, and on to France in 1769. While in France, he settled in Bayonne, and chose Ambroise de Lombez as his spiritual director, subscribing to his brand of piety based on interior resignation and confidence in God's grace. He returned to Lisbon after the accession of Queen Maria I, where he continued his successful teaching career, and was one of the founding members of the Lisbon Academy of Sciences in 1779. He delivered the controversial inaugural address at the Academy's first formal session, on 4 July 1780, in which he compared the country's backwardness in scientific matters to that of the Kingdom of Morocco.

Like the rest of the Portuguese elites, Almeida was horrified by the worst excesses of the French Revolution, and spent his final years as a vocal champion of Portugal's Christian heritage against atheism and the errors of a society based on the political philosophy of Jean-Jacques Rousseau.
