= Arthur Paul Carmona =

American wrongfully convicted of armed robbery

Arthur Paul Carmona (February 5, 1982 – February 17, 2008) served more than two years in prison after being wrongfully convicted of two armed robberies on the basis of eyewitness testimony. His case took on prominence in the ongoing debate in the legal community over the reliability of eyewitness identification. After his release, he had become an activist for the wrongfully accused.

== Trial and conviction ==
Carmona was arrested in Costa Mesa, California, just days after his 16th birthday; he had no prior criminal record and steadfastly maintained his innocence. When eyewitnesses failed to identify Carmona, police retrieved a Lakers cap obtained from the getaway driver and placed the hat on Carmona's head. With the hat from the getaway driver placed on Carmona's head, the eyewitnesses finally said Carmona was the robber. During his interrogation with Irvine detectives, police repeatedly lied when they told Carmona that they had evidence—including videotape—proving that he had committed the robbery. A 33-year-old man who admitted being the driver in the robberies identified Carmona as his accomplice as part of a plea bargain. An investigator for Carmona later said the man recanted and said he had never met Carmona until they were arrested. Police never established a link between the two. No physical evidence linked him to the crimes, even though police recovered a handgun, a backpack and a getaway car used in the crimes.

== Appeal and exoneration ==
Starting several months after Carmona's October 1998 conviction, it was Nadia Maria Davis, an attorney and activist, who first took on and brought attention to his plight. Los Angeles Times columnist Dana Parsons wrote a series of columns that raised questions about the evidence and argued for a new trial. In January 2000, the law firm of Sidley & Austin (now called Sidley Austin) took on the case for free and in February persuaded the California Court of Appeal to order the lower court to hold a hearing on the new evidence. On August 22, 2000, Sidley attorney Deborah Muns-Park, along with James M. Harris, Robert Fabrikant, and Steve Ellis, convinced Orange County Superior Court Judge Everett Dickey that Carmona had been convicted of a crime he did not commit, and the judge ordered him released. Instead of apologizing for bad police work, overzealous prosecutors and Carmona's two years in state prison, Orange County District Attorney Tony Rackauckas told Carmona he was lucky to be walking free and blamed the media for ruining his case.

After getting out of jail, Carmona moved to San Diego and got a job installing carpet with his father. He also traveled with his mother, a paralegal, to Sacramento to meet with groups like the California Innocence Project, which seeks to free wrongfully convicted inmates in the state's prison system.

== Death ==
In the months leading up to his death, Carmona had been dividing his time between advocating on behalf of wrongfully convicted inmates in the California prison system and taking firefighting classes at Santa Ana College. On February 17, 2008, his cousin began a fight and Carmona had attempted to stop the fight; which led to him being chased by those his cousin were fighting with and hit by a car. An ambulance took him, unconscious, to Garden Grove Medical Center, where he was pronounced dead.

== See also ==
- List of wrongful convictions in the United States

== Notes ==
1. Minsker, N: "OC Register", 2008.
2. Schou, N: "OC Weekly", 2006.
3. Berthelsen, C: "Los Angeles Times", 2008.
4. Schou, N: "OC Weekly", 2006.
5. Schou, N: "OC Weekly", 2008.
