= Manuel Salvador Carmona =

Spanish artist (1734–1820)

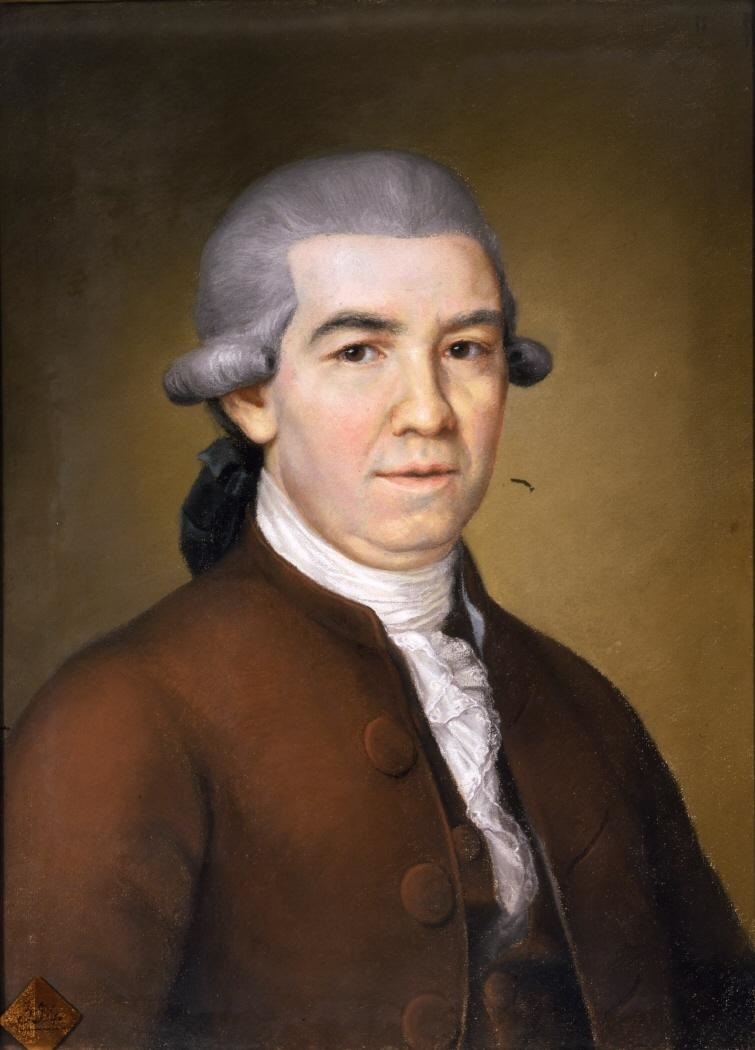
Manuel Salvador Carmona; portrait by Anna Maria Mengs

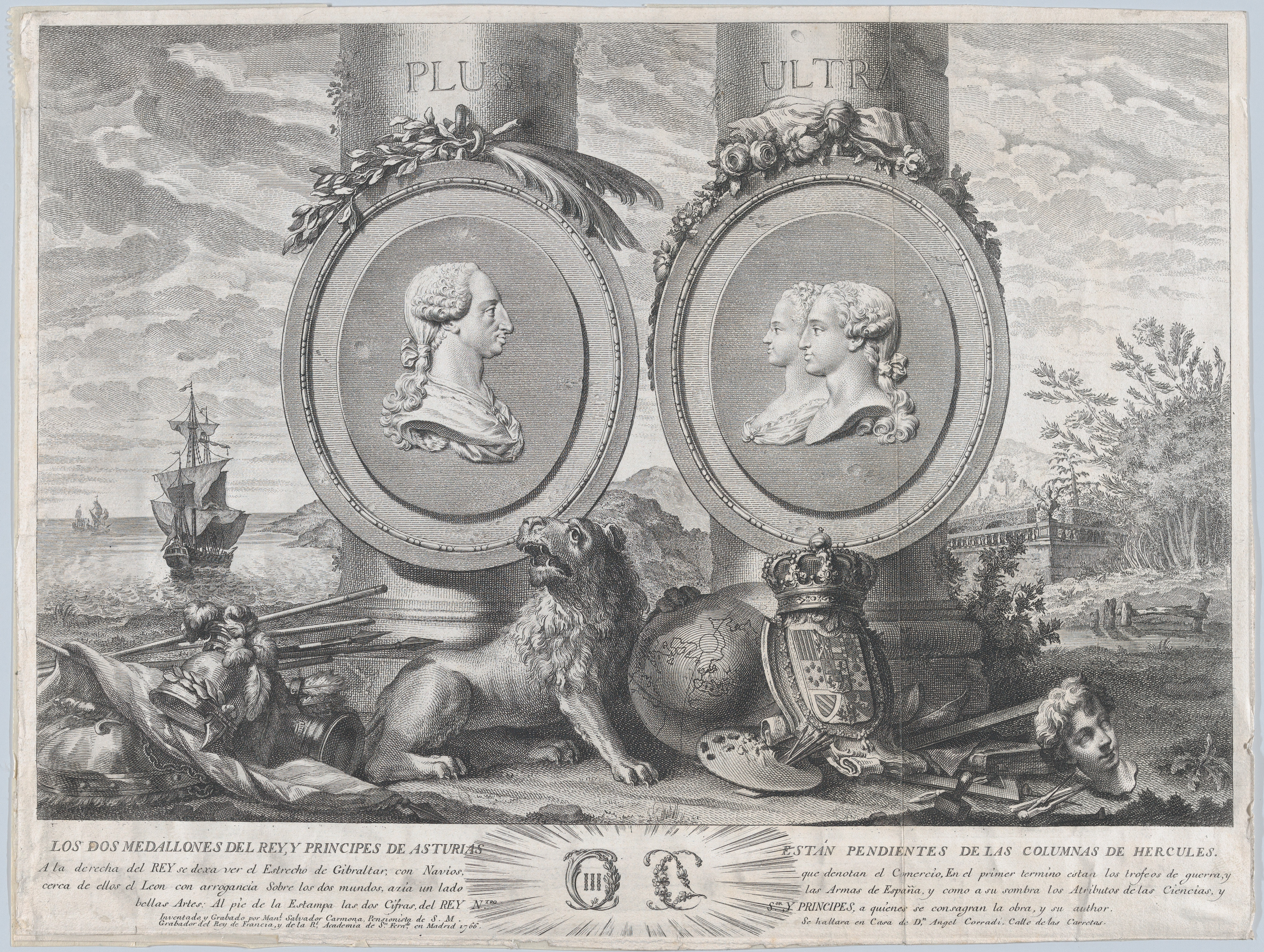
Bust Portraits of Charles III, with Charles IV and Queen Maria Luisa

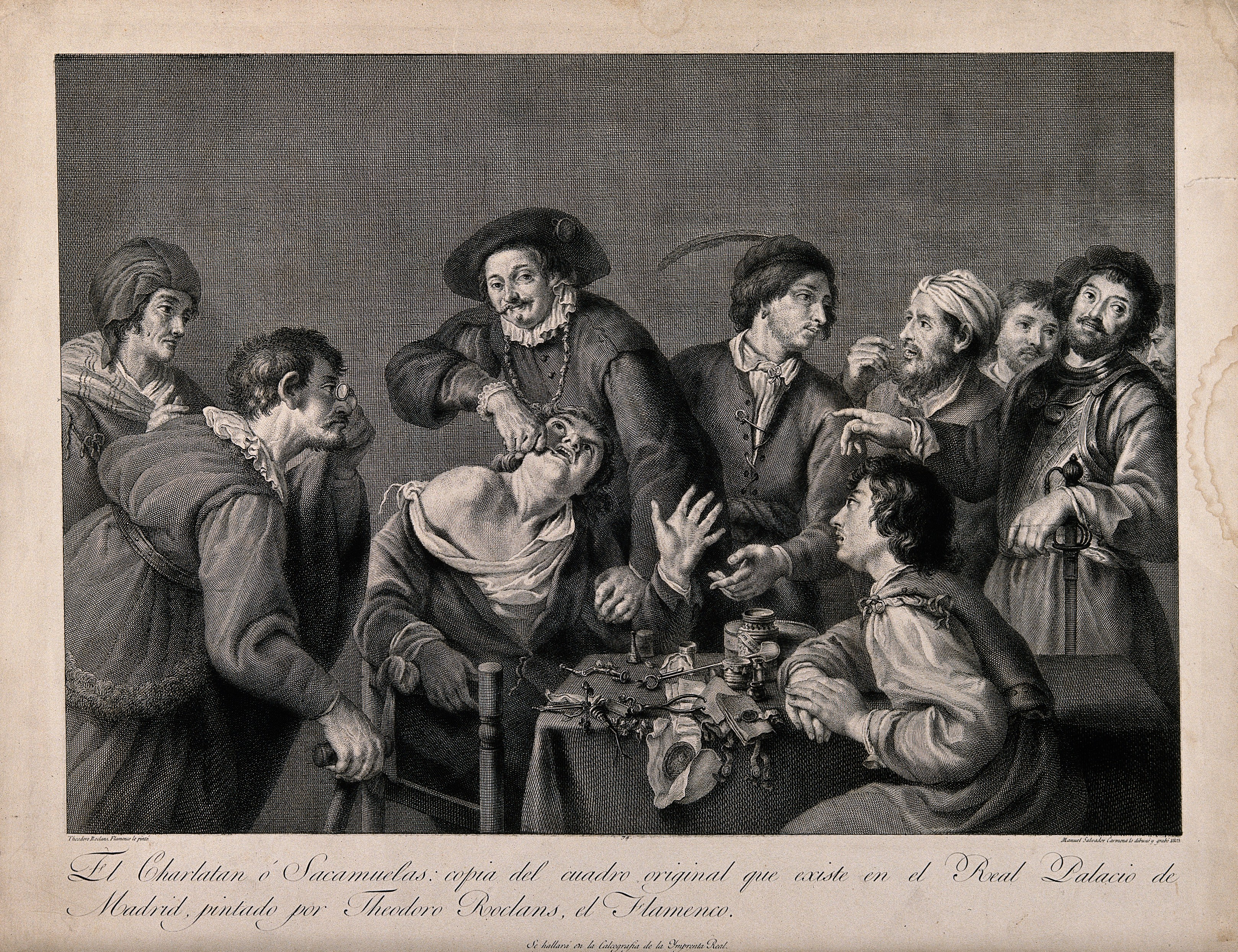
A Tooth-puller and his Patient

Manuel Salvador Carmona (20 May 1734 – 15 October 1820) was a Spanish engraver, designer and illustrator. Two of his brothers were also artists: José Salvador Carmona, a sculptor, and Juan Antonio Salvador Carmona, also an engraver.

== Biography ==
Carmona was born in Nava del Rey. His first studies were with his uncle, the sculptor Luis Salvador Carmona, at the Real Academia de Bellas Artes de San Fernando. Later, he studied in París, learning the burin technique from Nicolas-Gabriel Dupuis and becoming married to Marguerite Legrand. In 1759, he became an assistant at the Académie Royale de Peinture et de Sculpture. Two years later, he was admitted as a member and received the right to style himself "Engraver to the King".

In 1762, with his reputation at its height, he returned to Madrid, presenting himself at the Academia with a request to be named "honorary director". This was not granted but, in 1764, he was named an Academician of Merit and, in 1777, upon the death of Juan Bernabé Palomino, he became Director of Engraving. The following year, having become a widower, he married the artist Anna Maria Mengs, daughter of the court painter, Anton Raphael Mengs. In 1783, he became the court engraver. He died in Madrid.

He also served as a teacher. Among his notable students were his brother, Juan Antonio, José Gómez de Navia, Manuel Alegre, Luis Fernández Noseret and Fernando Selma. A few decades after his death, he was largely forgotten.

== Selected works ==
- An Allegory in honour of Charles III of Spain; after Francesco Solimena.
- Bacchus crowning his Votaries; after Velázquez.
- A Madonna seated on Clouds; after Murillo. 1802.
- A Madonna; after Van Dyck. 1757.
- The Resurrection; after Van Loo. 1757.
- St. John the Baptist; after Anton Raphael Mengs. 1784.
- The Magdalene; after the same.
- St. Ferdinand praying; after Murillo. 1791.
- Angels appearing to Mary Magdalene; alter Guercino.
- Portrait of François Boucher; after Roslin Sedois
- Portrait of Collin de Vermont; ibid
- Portrait of Charles III.; after Anton Raphael Mengs. 178Í!.
- Don Alfonso de Guzman; after Van Dyck.
- Joseph, a Carmelite Monk; after Velázquez

== Sources ==
- Carderera, Valentín: Manuel Salvador Carmona (1734-1820). Grabador de las cortes reales de España y Francia; ed. de Juan José Antequera Luengo; Sevilla, Facediciones, 2010.
- Carrete Parrondo, Juan, El grabado a buril en la España Ilustrada. Manuel Salvador Carmona, Madrid, Fábrica Nacional de Moneda y Timbre, 1989
- Carrete Parrondo, Juan, Diccionario de grabadores y litógrafos que trabajaron en España. Siglos XIV a XIX
- Gallego, Antonio, Historia del grabado en España, Madrid, Ediciones Cátedra, 1999, ISBN 84-376-0209-2
