= Pedro de Ribera =

Spanish architect

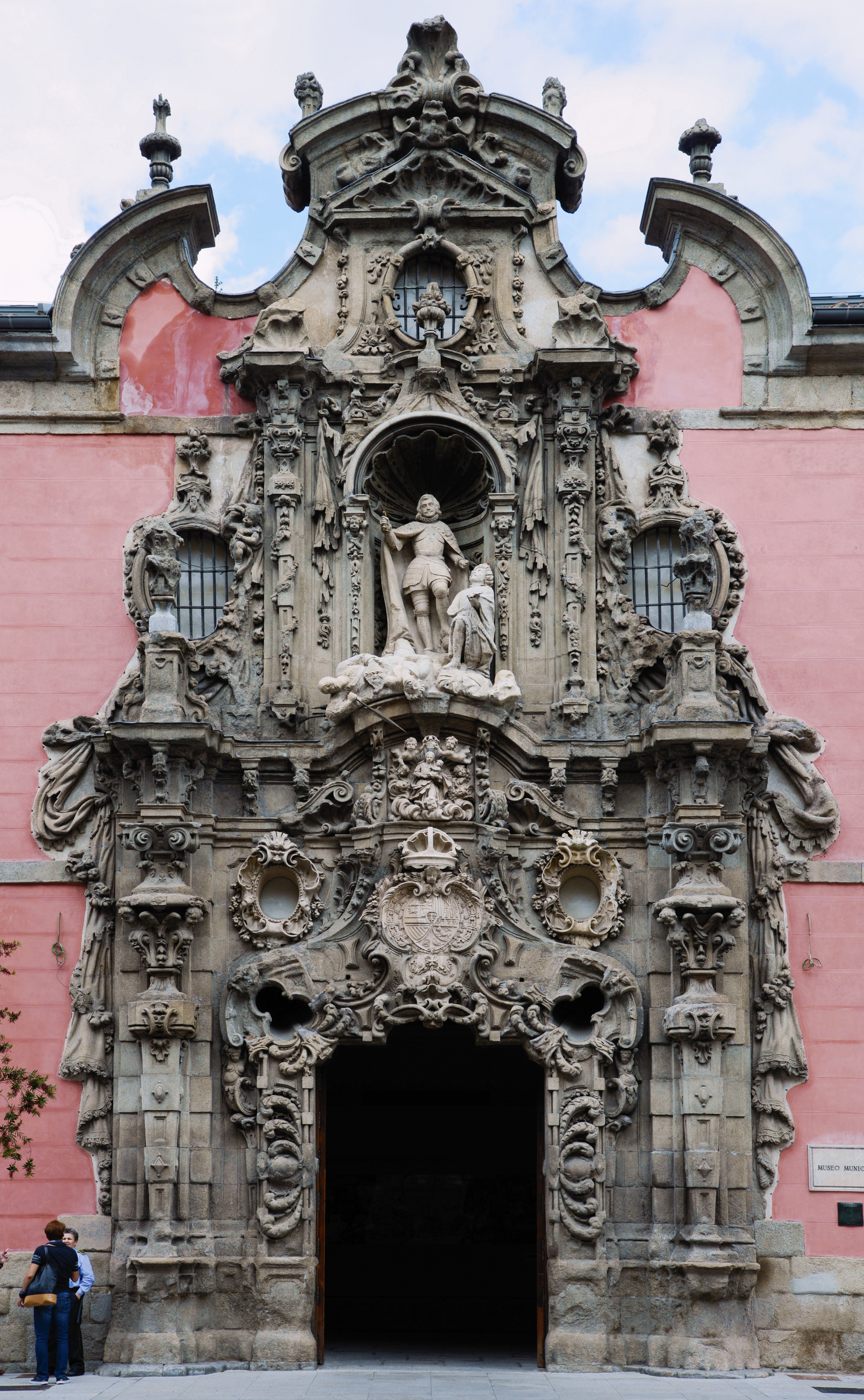
Royal Hospice of San Fernando. Madrid

Pedro de Ribera (Madrid 4 August 1681 - Madrid, 1742) was a Spanish architect of the Baroque period.

== Biography ==
Ribera worked almost exclusively in Madrid during the first half of the 18th century. He was a disciple of José Benito de Churriguera (creator of the style Churrigueresque). Following in the footsteps of his master, Ribera is considered one of the most important architects of the late Baroque period in Spain. He designed a remarkable quantity of work in Madrid, the capital of Spain, giving the city bridges, palaces, monumental fountains, churches and a variety of public buildings, many of which can still be seen.

Between 1718 and 1719, he was Lieutenant Major Master of Works and sources of Madrid, succeeding Teodoro Ardemans following his death. This position cemented his reputation and allowed him to occupy an important position at court, despite the clear preference of King Philip V of Spain of the sort of foreign architects working in Madrid in the 1720s.

Many of Ribera's creations were destroyed or modified later, especially in the 18th century, when Neoclassicism was a dominating movement. Ribera's architectural style was attacked by influential art scholars like Antonio Ponz.

== Works ==
Francisco Antonio de Salcedo and Aguirre, Marqués de Vadillo, was a patron of Ribera who encouraged him and funded many of his projects. These may include:

- Paseo Nuevo. Puerta de San Vicente (1726–1727)
- Ermita de Nuestra Señora del Puerto (1716–1718)
- Cuartel del Conde-Duque (Guardias de Corps) (iniciado en 1717)
- Puente de Toledo (1718–1732)
- Iglesia de Nuestra Señora de Montserrat (1720)
- Real Hospicio del Ave María y San Fernando (1721–1726)
- Iglesia de San Cayetano (1722–1737)
- Iglesia de San José (1730)
- Portada de la capilla del antiguo Monte de Piedad de Madrid (1733)
- Real Seminario de Nobles (finalizado en 1725)
- Fuente de la Mariblanca (1726)
- Puente Verde (1728–1732)
- Puente sobre el Abroñigal (1729–1732)
- Carmelitas Descalzas (1730–1742)
- Monasterio de Uclés (1735)
- Teatro de la Cruz (1743)
- Camino nuevo del Escorial (1737)
- Palacio de Torrecilla (1716–1731)
- Palacio del marqués de Miraflores (1731–1732)
- Palacio de Santoña (1730–1734)
- Palacio de Perales (1732)
- Fuente de la Fama (c. 1732)
