= Rigoberto Romero Carmona =

Cuban photographer

- Born: September 22, 1940; Pinar del Río, Cuba
- Died: August 25, 1991 (aged 50); Havana
- Occupation: Photographer

Rigoberto Romero Carmona (September 22, 1940 in Pinar del Río, Cuba – August 25, 1991 in Havana) was a Cuban photographer.

== Individual exhibitions ==
In 1982, Romero presented the solo exhibition El patio de mi casa no es particular, seen at the Premio de Fotografía Cubana, Galería 10 de Octubre, Havana. That same year he presented Dos fotógrafos cubanos [Iván Cañas/Rigoberto Romero] at the Asociación de Amistad Cuba Finlandia, in Helsinki, Finland. In 1988, he exhibited Con sudor de millonario at the Casa de la Amistad Cubano Finlandesa, Helsinki.

In 1992, he presented Direct from Cuba [José A. Figueroa/Rigoberto Romero/Mario Díaz] at Raleigh Studios, Hollywood, California.

== Collective exhibitions ==
In 1986, Romero participated in the Second Havana biennial, held at the Museo Nacional de Bellas Artes, Havana.

In 1991, his work was included in the show Fotografía Cubana Contemporánea en 150 Imágenes, Taller Internacional de la Imagen Fotográfica, a collateral exhibition to the Cuarta Havana Biennial, shown at the Centro de Prensa Internacional, Havana. In 1998 he was one of the selected artists for Cuba: 100 años de fotografía, seen at Casa de América, Madrid, Spain.

== Awards ==
In 1976 Romero received a Mention in the VI Salón Nacional de Fotografía, Unión de Periodistas de Cuba, Havana. In 1981 he won the Prize (collective) at the Premio de Fotografía Contemporánea Latinoamericana y del Caribe, Galería Latinoamericana, Casa de las Américas, Havana. In 1982, he was awarded a Mention in Photography at the Salón de Artes Plásticas UNEAC '82, Museo Nacional de Bellas Artes, Havana.

== Collections ==
His works are in collections such as the Casa de las Américas, Havana, and the Center for Cuban Studies, New York. His works can be seen in the Consejo Mexicano de Fotografía, Mexico, and in the Fototeca de Cuba, Havana.
