= Nava del Rey =

Coordinates: 41°20′N 5°05′W

Nava del Rey, Spain
- Coat of arms

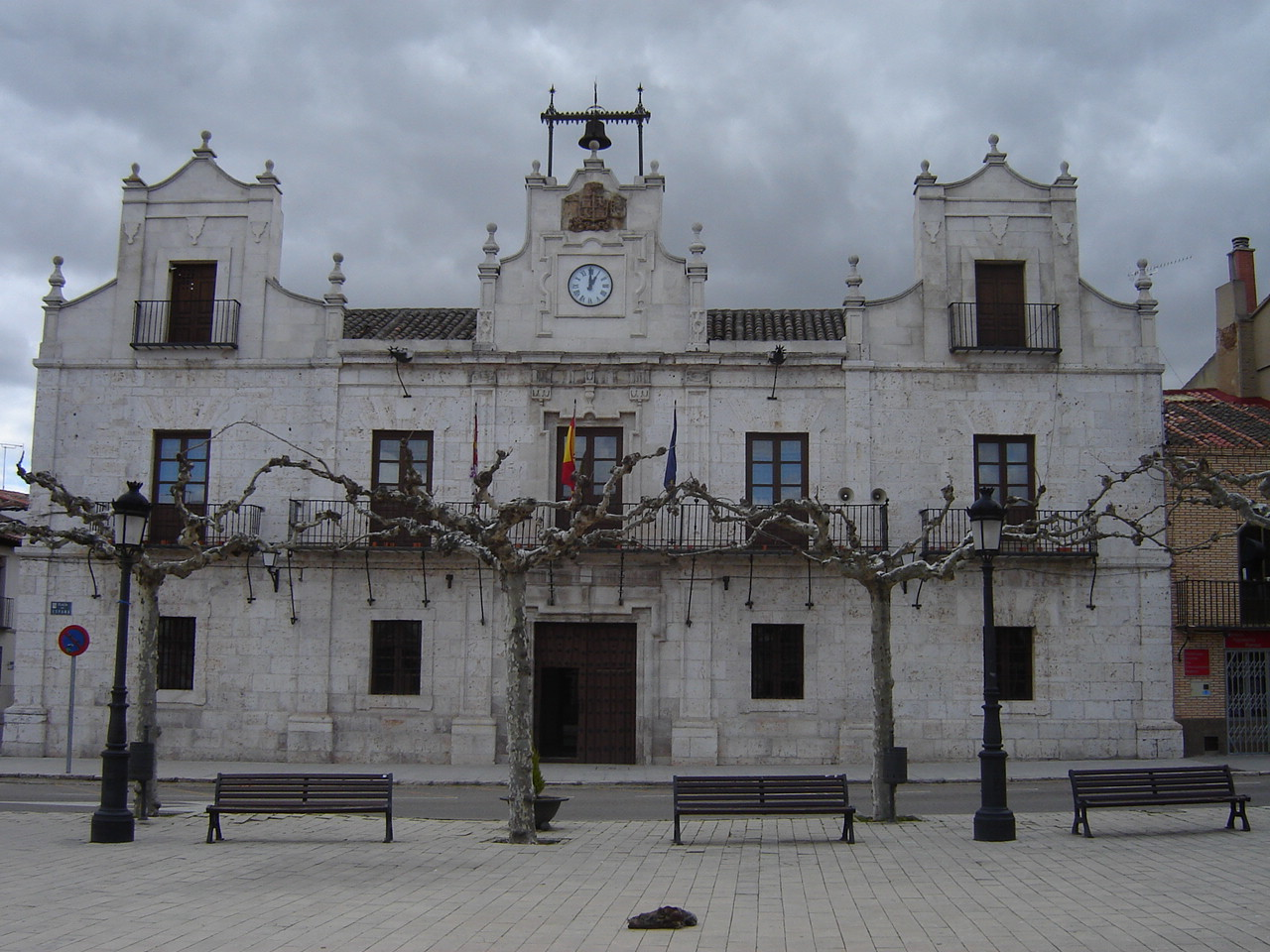
- town hall
- Country: Spain
- Autonomous community: Castile and León
- Province: Valladolid
- Municipality: Nava del Rey

Area
  - Total: 126 km^{2} (49 sq mi)

Population (2025-01-01)
  - Total: 1,924
  - Density: 15.3/km^{2} (39.5/sq mi)
- Time zone: UTC+1 (CET)
  - Summer (DST): UTC+2 (CEST)

Nava del Rey is a municipality located in the province of Valladolid, Castile and León, Spain. According to the 2004 census (INE), the municipality has a population of 2,127 inhabitants.

== Transportation ==
Nava del Rey has a station on the Medina del Campo-Zamora Railway, providing passenger on the Renfe Media Distancia service #18 from Zamora to Valladolid.
