= Mengs (disambiguation) =

Anton Rapael Mengs was a German Neoclassical painter. Mengs may also refer to:

- Ismael Mengs (1688–1764), Danish-born portrait painter and court painter to Augustus II of Poland; father of Anton Raphael Mengs.
- Therese Mengs (1725–1806), German-born pastel artist and teacher; daughter of above and wife of Anton von Maron.
- Julia Charlotte Mengs (1730–after 1806), German painter and nun; sister of above.
- Anna Maria Mengs (1751–1792), German pastel and miniature artist; daughter of Anton Raphael Mengs and niece of above.

== See also ==
- Meng (disambiguation)
