= Mengzhou =

Mengzhou or Meng Zhou may refer to:

- Mengzhou (spacecraft) (Mandarin Chinese: 梦舟, romanized: Mèng-zhōu, lit. 'Dream Boat'), a Chinese crewed space capsule for cis-lunar operations
- Mengzhou, Henan (Mandarin Chinese: 孟州, romanized: Mèngzhōu), Henan, China; a county-level city

== People ==
- Mengzhou (Chinese: 猛昼), a Miao tribe in Huaning County, Yunnan Province, China

=== Given name: Mengzhou, Meng-zhou ===
- Hu Mengzhou (Chinese: 胡梦周, romanized: Hú Mèng Zhōu; stagename: CORSAK), Chinese producer-singer-songwriter musician
- Jiang Mengzhou（Chinese: 姜梦周, romanized: Jiāng Mèng Zhōu; 1883—1929), Chinese revolutionary from Shatian Township, Ningxiang City, Hunan Province, China

=== Given name: Meng; surname: Zhou ===
- Zhou Meng (Chinese: 周萌, romanized: Zhōu Méng; born 2001), Chinese badminton player, silver medalist at the 2019; and gold medalist at the 2017 and 2018 BWF World Junior Championships
- Zhou Meng (Chinese: 周萌, romanized: Zhōu Méng; born 1957), Chinese politician, a member of the 11th National People's Congress

== See also ==
- Zhou (disambiguation)
- Meng (disambiguation)
