= Self-Portrait (Mengs) =

Painting by Anton Raphael Mengs

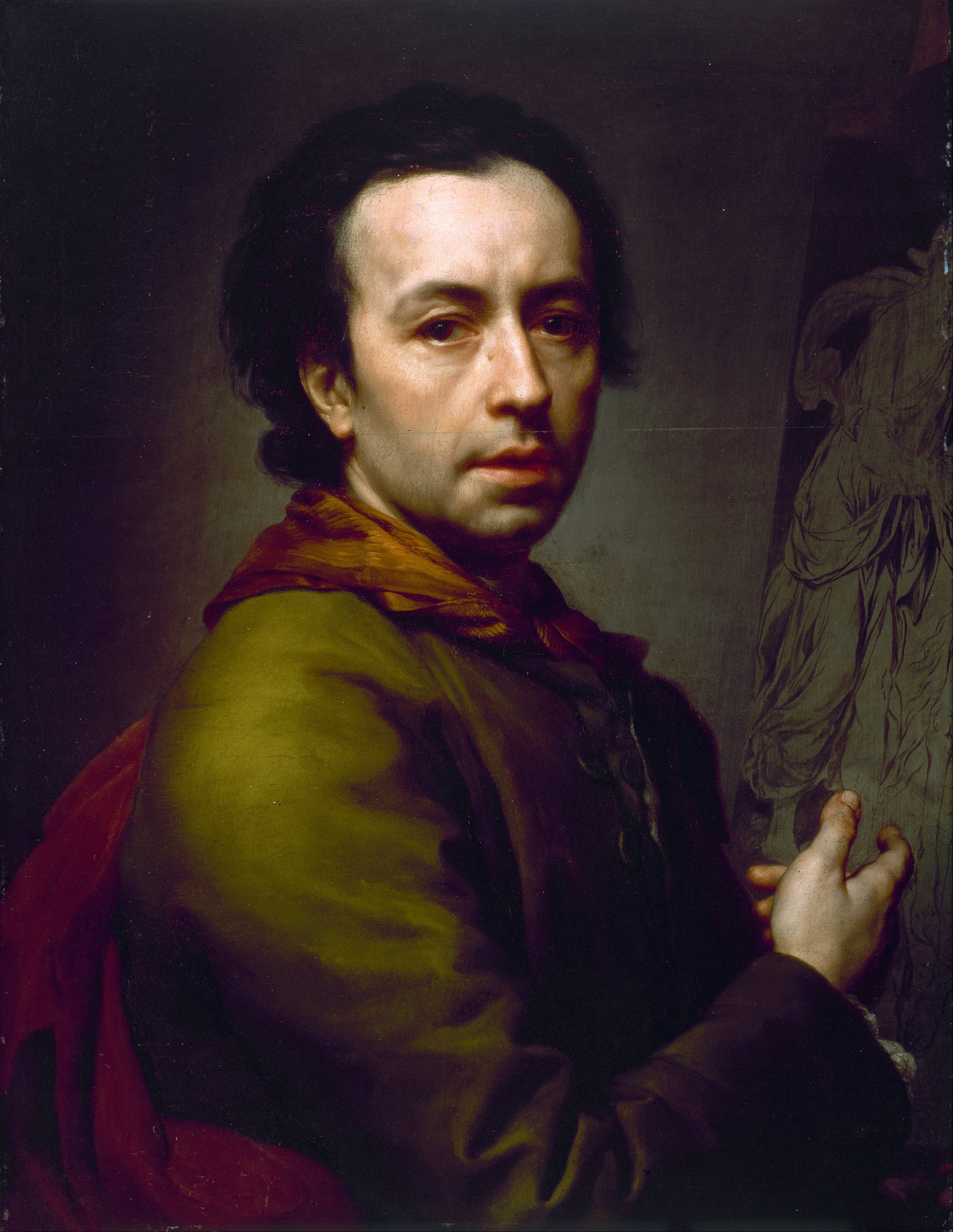
- Artist: Anton Raphael Mengs
- Year: 1774
- Type: Oil on panel, portrait painting
- Dimensions: 73.5 cm × 56.2 cm (28.9 in × 22.1 in)
- Location: Walker Art Gallery, Liverpool

Self-Portrait is a 1774 oil painting by the German artist Anton Raphael Mengs. A self-portrait, if shows the artist at work on Perseus and Andromeda, one of his last major paintings. Both that and this work were commissioned by British patrons, demonstrating his popularity there. It appears to capture a degree of his exhaustion under the weight of his work. This picture was produced for the aristocrat Earl Cowper who lived in Italy.

Mengs was a major figure in the Neoclassical movement which was then at its height. The painting was acquired by the Walker Art Gallery in Liverpool in 1953. Around the same time he produced another notable Self-Portrait, now in the collection of the Uffizi in Florence.

== Bibliography ==
- Bell, Alex. Anton Raphael Mengs And His British Patrons. Zwemmer, 1993.
- Bietoletti, Silvestra Neoclassicism and Romanticism. Sterling Publishing, 2009
