= Meng =

Meng may refer to:

- Meng (surname) (孟), a Chinese surname
- Master of Engineering (MEng or M.Eng.), an academic or professional master's degree in the field of engineering
- ɱ, "M with hook", letter used in the International Phonetic Alphabet
  - Labiodental nasal consonantal sound, the sound transcribed by that letter
- Meng (designer), British fashion house
- Marketing Executives Network Group, American non-profit professional association
- Haku (wrestler), a former wrestler who used "Meng" as his stage name in World Championship Wrestling
- Meng (river), in Austria, tributary of the Ill
- Meng and Ecker, British underground comic
- Mueang, pre-modern Tai polities in southwestern China, mainland Southeast Asia, and parts of India, pronounced "Meng" in Chinese
- League (China) (Chinese: 盟; pinyin: méng), a prefecture-level administrative unit of the autonomous region of Inner Mongolia in the People's Republic of China.

== See also ==
- 猛 (disambiguation)
