= Anton von Maron =

Austrian painter (1733–1808)

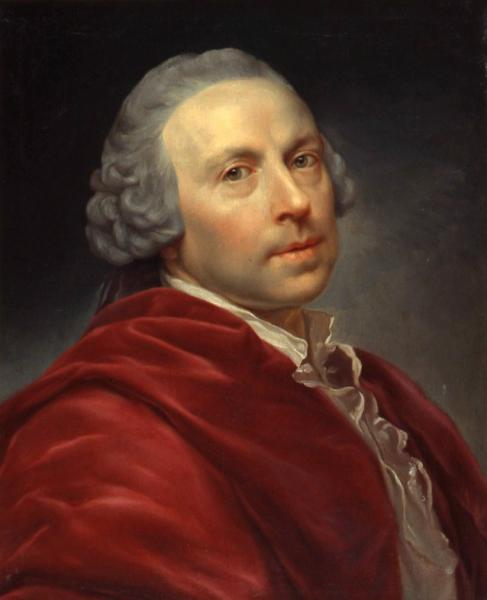
Self-portrait (late 1700s)

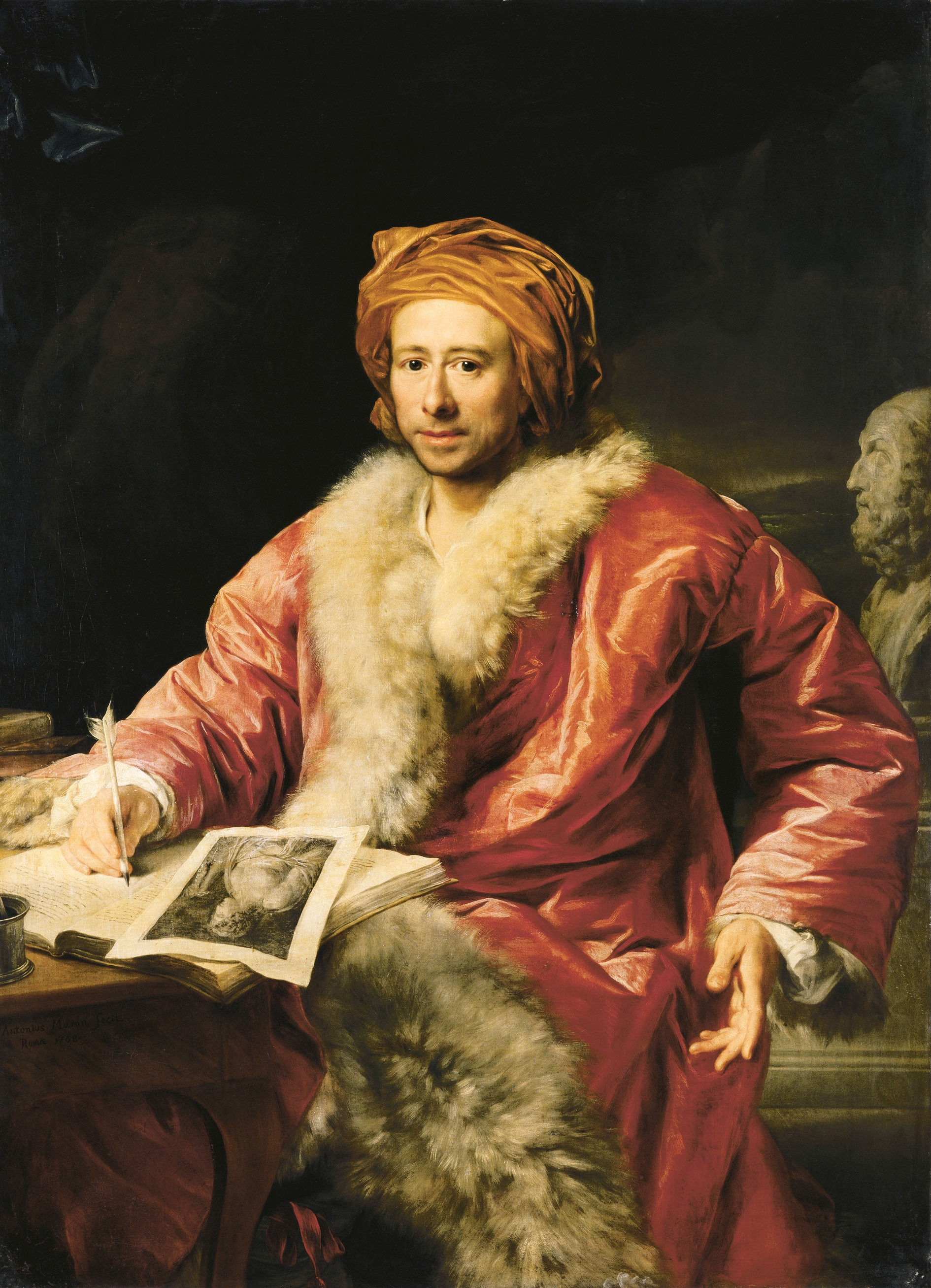
Portrait of Johann Joachim Winckelmann (1768)

Anton von Maron (8 January 1733 – 3 March 1808, Rome) was an Austrian painter who specialized in portraits.

== Life and work ==
Maron was born on 8 January 1733, in Vienna, to painter Johann Leopold Maron (1696–1770) and his wife Anna Catharina (née Schuster). From 1741 to 1744, he was a student at the Academy of Fine Arts Vienna, where he trained under Karl Aigen. He also studied with Daniel Gran. In 1755, Maron moved to Rome.

In 1754, Anton Raphael Mengs became director of the Vatican painting school. From 1756 to 1761, Maron served as Mengs' pupil and assistant. In 1765, he married Mengs' sister, Therese, who was also an artist.

The following year, he became a member of the Accademia di San Luca. This brought him into contact with several important persons who helped him establish a connection between the Viennese and Roman art communities. His classically-inspired works made a lasting impression on the work of fellow Austrian Martin Knoller.

Maron became one of the most highly regarded portrait painter in eighteenth-century Rome. He received a number of commissions from both church dignitaries and English aristocrats passing through on the Grand Tour. His first portrait to attract critical attention was one of the art historian, Johann Joachim Winckelmann; now in the Schloss Weimar. From 1770, he painted several members of the Habsburg family, including Empress Maria Theresa. In addition to portraits, he and Mengs worked together on frescoes in the Church of San Eusebio and at the Villa Albani (1757-1760). His portrait of British merchant Peter Du Cane Sr. hangs in the Birmingham Museum and Art Gallery.

In 1772, he served as a consultant for the reorganization of the Vienna Academy. Following his recommendations, the Academy began sending scholarship holders to study in Italy, and placed them under his supervision. Shortly after, he was raised to the nobility and given the title of Baron. He held academic positions in both cities, became a lecturer, and wrote some treatises on art.

For most of his career he was successful and respected, but by the time of the Napoleonic period, his style fell out of fashion.

== Sources ==
- Constantin von Wurzbach: "Maron, Anton von." In: Biographisches Lexikon des Kaiserthums Oesterreich (Biographical Lexicon of the Empire of Austria). Part 17 Kaiserlich-königliche Hof- und Staatsdruckerei, Vienna 1867, p. 5–7 (digitalised).
- Albert Ilg (1884). "Maron, Anton von" . Allgemeine Deutsche Biographie (in German). Vol. 20. Leipzig: Duncker & Humblot. pp. 403–404.
- Elisabeth Hermann-Fichtenau (1990). "Maron, Anton von". Neue Deutsche Biographie (in German). Vol. 16. Berlin: Duncker & Humblot. pp. 233–234. (full text online).
