= Portrait of Ferdinand IV =

1759 painting by Anton Raphael Mengs

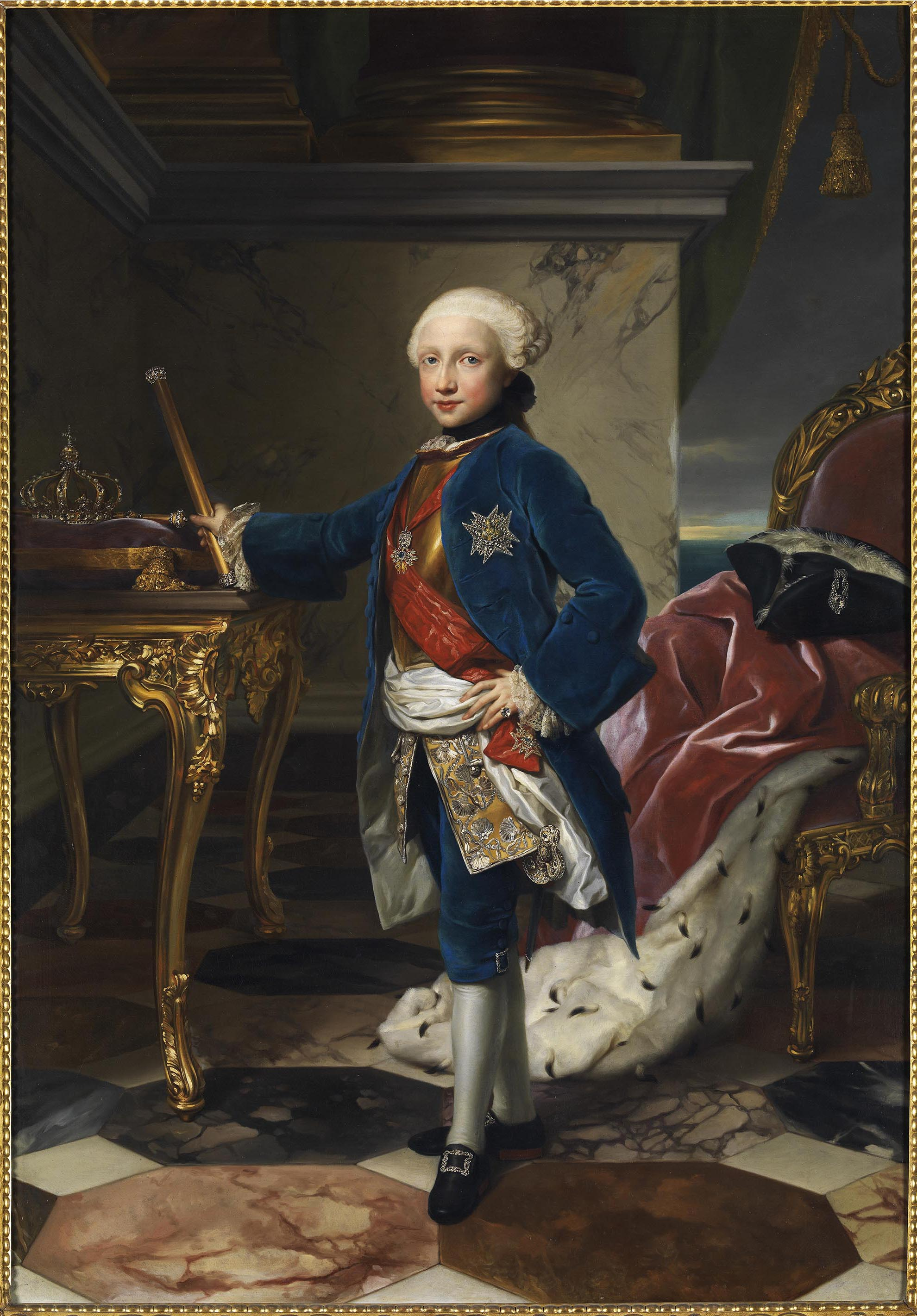
- Artist: Anton Raphael Mengs
- Year: 1759
- Medium: oil on canvas
- Dimensions: 180 cm × 126 cm (71 in × 50 in)
- Location: Museo di Capodimonte, Naples

Portrait of Ferdinand IV is a 1759 painting by Anton Raphael Mengs, now in the National Museum of Capodimonte, in Naples.

== Description ==
It depicts Ferdinand IV of the Kingdom of Naples, later (after 1816) known as Ferdinand I of the Two Sicilies, and was commissioned by his mother Maria Amalia of Saxony to celebrate Ferdinand's accession to the throne of Kingdom of Naples aged eight after his father Charles of Bourbon's abdicated that throne to be king of Spain. This makes it the first official painting of the new king, produced by the artist in October 1759 in around a month, though it was critiqued by the other court artists Luigi Vanvitelli, Giuseppe Bonito and Francesco Liani, who had been passed over for the commission. Mengs also produced in 1760 a second copy of the painting, which was sent to Ferdinand's parents in Madrid and which is now in the Prado Museum. Visually the main difference between the two paintings is the signature on 1760 copy, located on the square tile in bottom left corner.

== Gallery ==
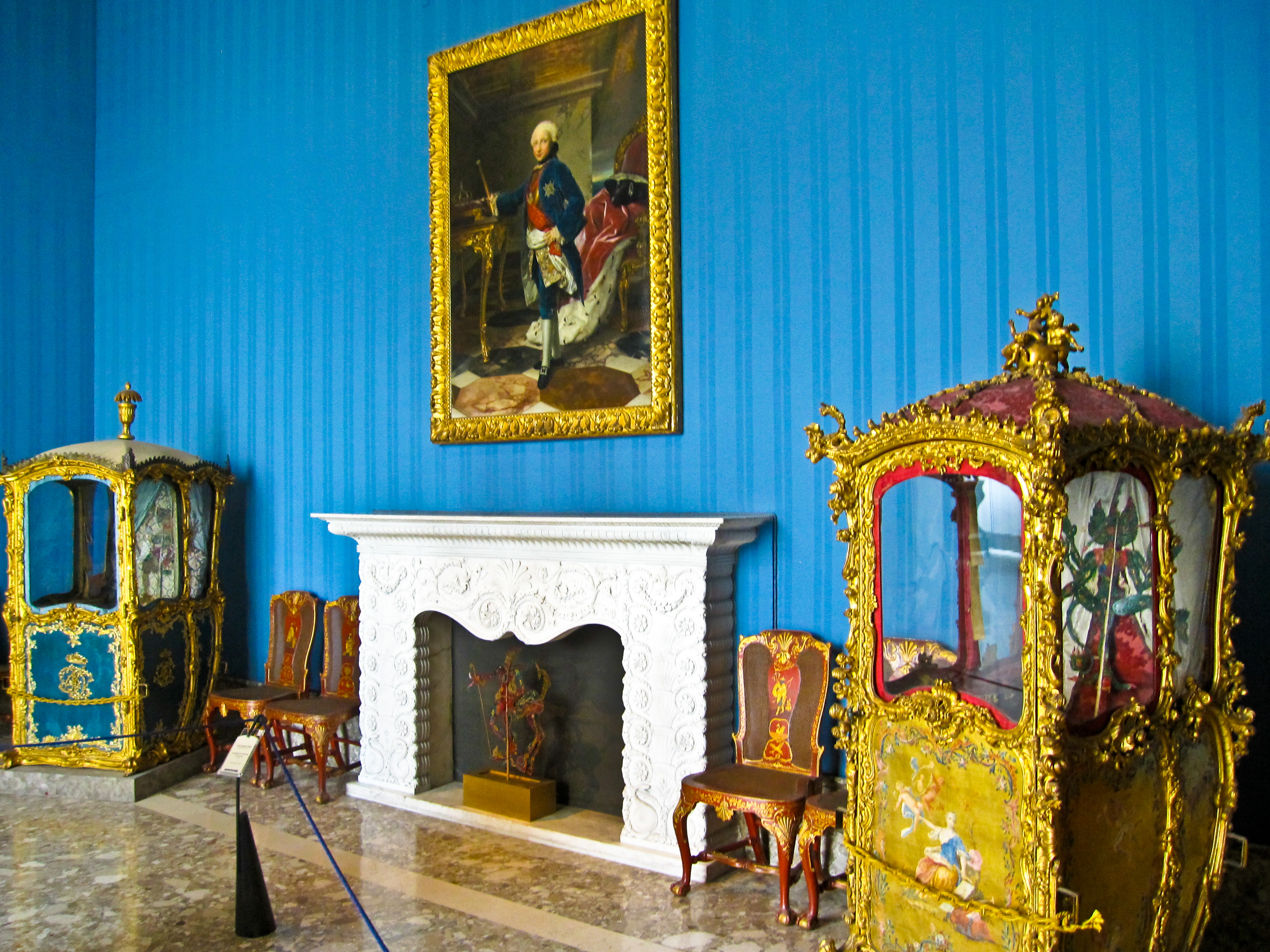
The painting displayed in the room 33 of the Palace of Capodimonte.

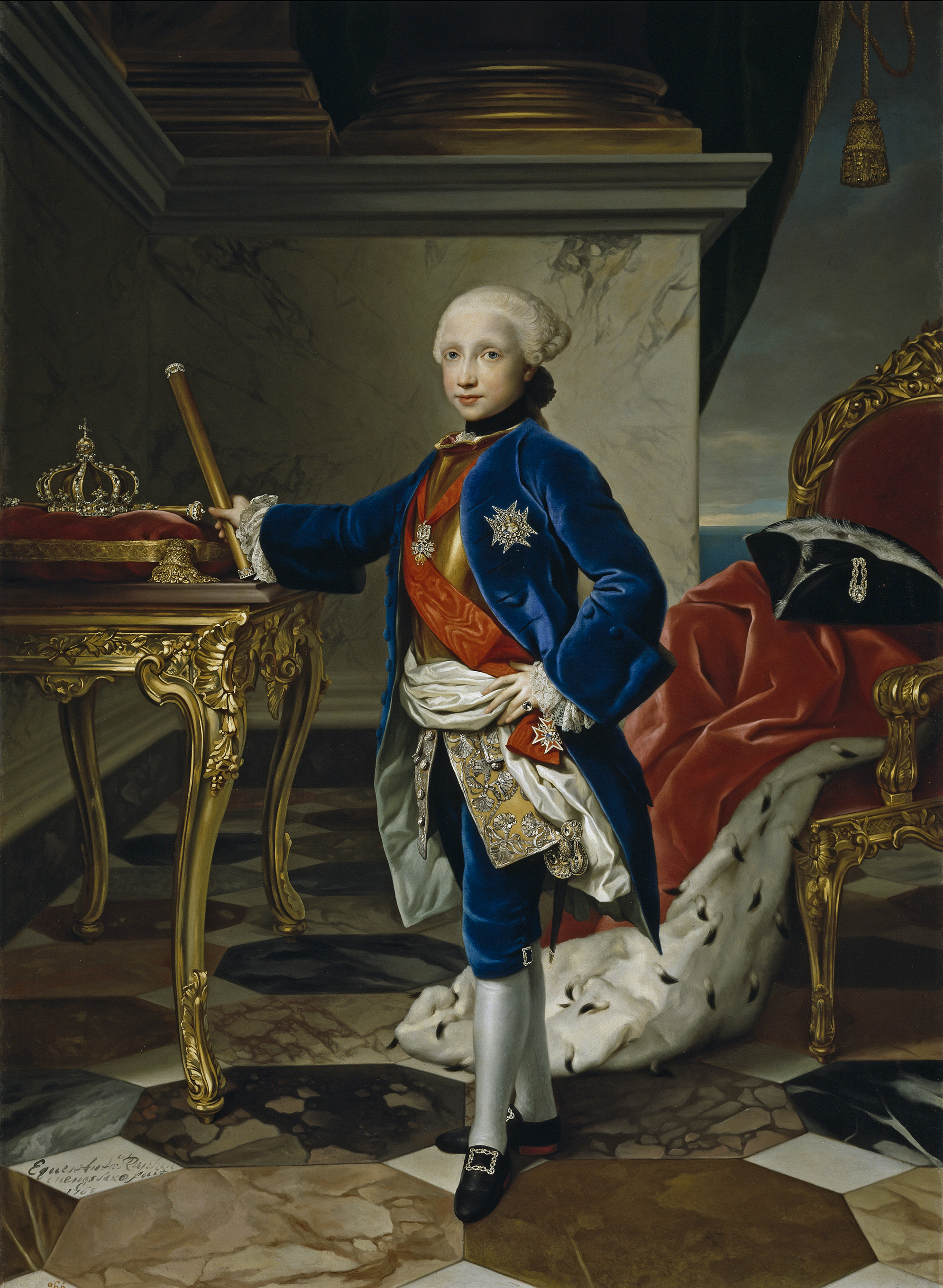
The 1760 copy now in the Museo del Prado, Spain.

== Sources ==
- http://cir.campania.beniculturali.it/museodicapodimonte/itinerari-tematici/galleria-di-immagini/OA900326
- Mario Sapio, Il Museo di Capodimonte, Napoli, Arte'm, 2012. ISBN 978-88-569-0303-4
- Touring Club Italiano, Museo di Capodimonte, Milano, Touring Club Editore, 2012. ISBN 978-88-365-2577-5
