= 猛 =

猛, meaning 'fierce', may refer to:

- Meng, a Chinese given name for Wang Meng (Former Qin) (325–375) and Wang Meng (footballer) (born 1993)
- Takeshi, a masculine Japanese given name

== See also ==
- Meng (disambiguation)
