= Julia Charlotte Mengs =

German painter (c. 1730 – after 1806)

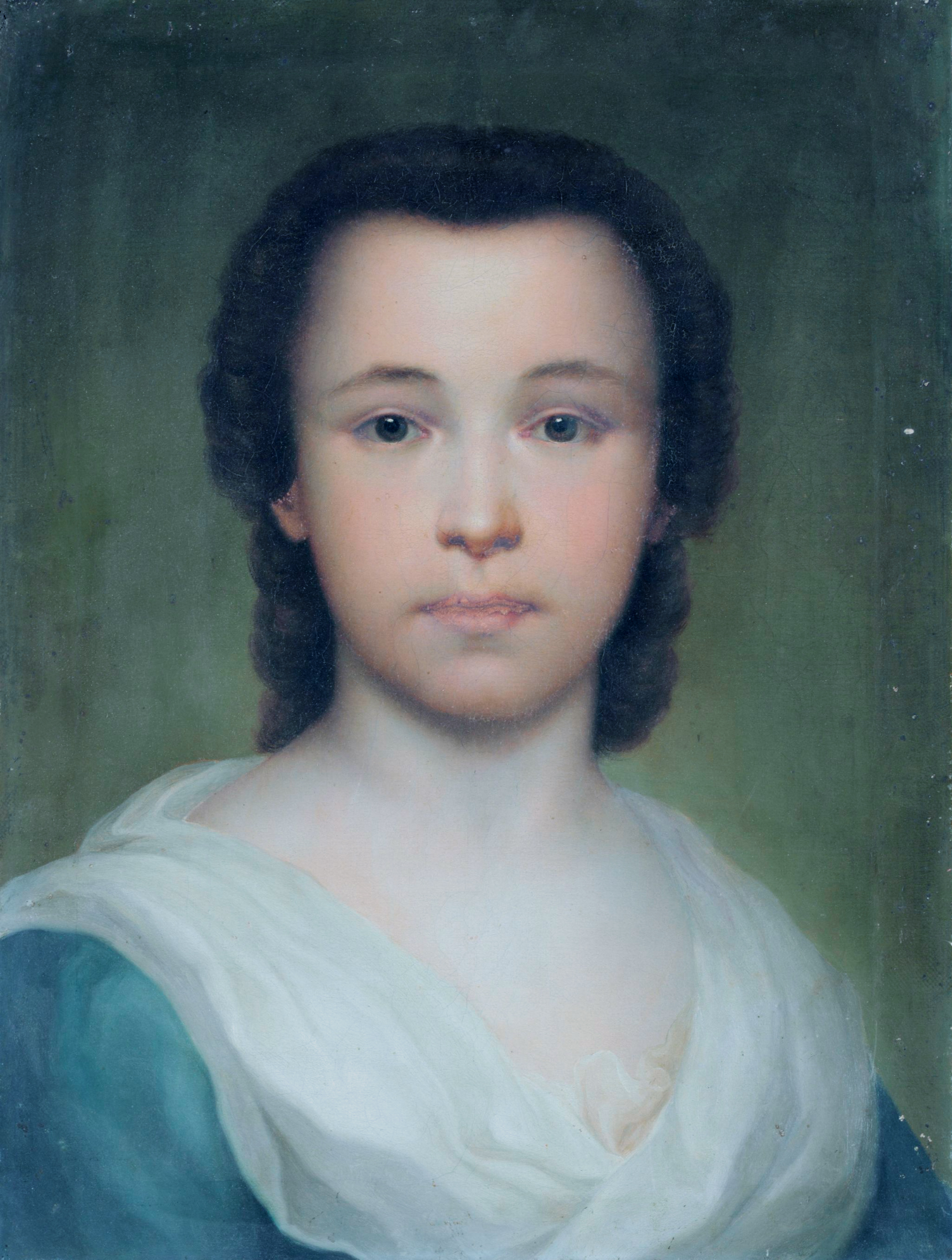
- Portrait attributed to Therese Mengs, c. 1748
- Born: 1730; Bohemia, Habsburg Empire
- Died: after 1806; Ancona, Italy
- Occupation: Painter
- Relatives: Anton Raphael Mengs (brother); Therese Mengs (sister); Anna Maria Mengs (niece)

Julia Charlotte Mengs (c. 1730 – after 1806) was a German painter.

Julia Charlotte was born in Bohemia, into the Lutheran family of Danish painter Ismael Mengs, a hofmaler (court painter) at the court of Saxonian-Polish electors and kings. She was the younger sister of Therese Maron and Anton Raphael Mengs, and also embarked on a career as a court painter. However, in 1765, she entered the Belvedere Convent in the March of Ancona, taking the name of Sister Maria Speranda. She died there sometime after 1806. No work by Julia appears to have survived, although a pastel portrait of her traditionally described as being by her sister has sometimes been suggested to be a self-portrait instead.
