= Meng (designer) =

British fashion house

MENG
- Industry: Fashion
- Founded: 2012; 13 years ago
- Founder: Meng Zhang
- Headquarters: London, England, United Kingdom
- Website: meng.co.uk

MENG is a luxury lifestyle label based in London. Founded by Meng Zhang in 2012., the company creates ready to wear, homeware and accessories with art prints. The collections are based on these prints which are hand-drawn in London, the fabric is printed and all garments are made in the UK.

The collections were stocked by Selfridges and Neiman Marcus in the first season. Since launching, Meng has expanded their list of stockists across 13 countries, to include Harrods, Matches Fashion, Nordstrom (Canada), Steffl (Austria), Tsum (Russia), Coin (Italy), Kadewe (Germany) amongst other boutiques internationally, the US being their biggest market

== Background ==
Meng founded the company in London in 2012. Meng's career includes a senior role at Chanel, head of buying position at Lane Crawford China and a country director role at Inditex, managing the expansion of the group's 8 brands in China.

Meng combined business and fashion studies, completing an MBA from London Business School, an MA from London College of Fashion and art studies at Central Saint Martins and Royal College of Art.

== Collections ==
Meng's first collection was loungewear. Later the company added beachwear, homeware and are now developing a women's ready-to-wear range. Meng has also exhibited their loungewear collection at New York Trade event Curve Expo. A capsule collection of made-to-order evening gowns was recently shown alongside their lounge and beach ranges at London Fashion Week. Their first menswear collection was shown at London Collection's Men in June 2016 and will be stocked at Harrods & Matches Fashion in November 2016.

== Loungewear ==
Loungewear was MENG's first collection and has the largest variety of styles. The loungewear shapes are designed to be worn at home and include kimonos and wraps, pajama sets and slips with elaborate prints in many colours.

== Printing ==
MENG's prints contain motifs from nature, art, culture, fashion, interiors and architecture. These elements are used by MENG's in-house artists and designers to create prints and designs with multiple influences.

The artists hand-draw each piece in the London studio several months in advance of the collection launch. The surface design on the silk is printed at a specialist mill in the UK. The printed silks then come back to London, where they are made into the final garments in factories or the brand's studio.

== E-commerce ==
MENG products are available internationally through stockists and through their recently launched e-commerce site.

== In popular culture ==
MENG products have been featured in TV shows, including: Scandal, True Detective, Grace and Frankie, and Made in Chelsea.
