= Ismael Mengs =

Danish-born painter (1690–1765)

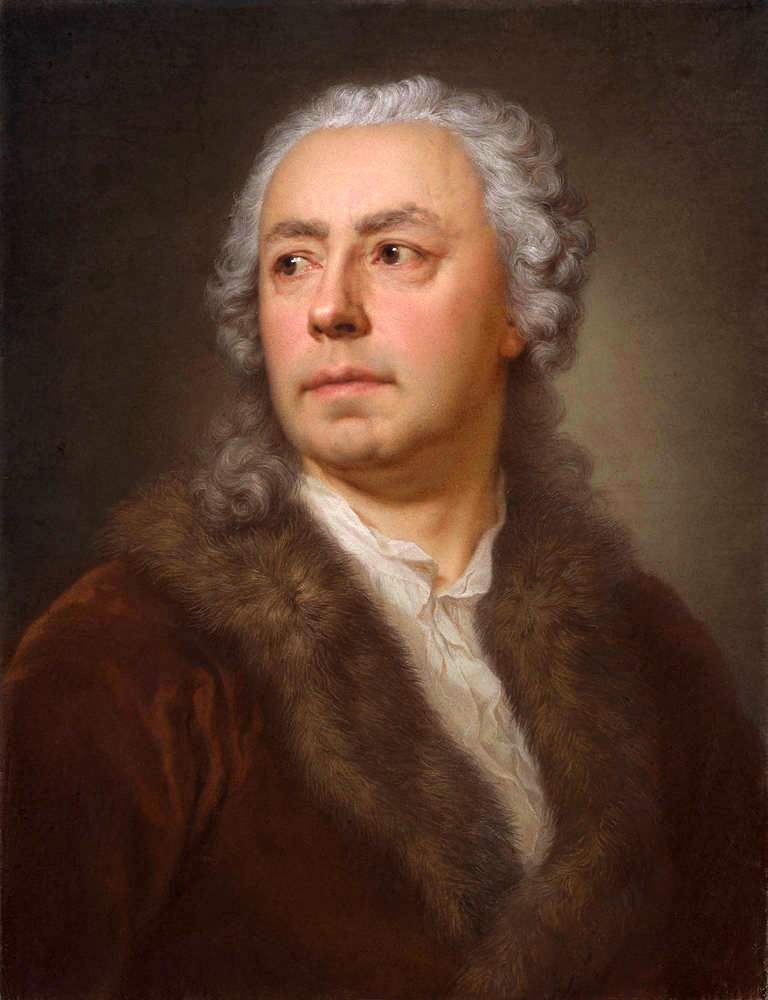
- Portrait by his son Anton Raphael Mengs (c. 1744–1745)
- Born: 1688; Copenhagen
- Died: 26 December 1764 (aged 75–76); Dresden
- Spouse: Charlotte Burmann (m. 1720)
- Children: Anton Raphael Mengs; Therese Concordia Maron; Julia Charlotte Mengs

Ismael Israel Mengs (1688–1764) was a Danish-born portrait and enamel painter of Jewish ancestry; active mainly at the court of Dresden.

== Biography ==
His family was originally from Lusatia. He began by studying enamel painting with Benoît Le Coffre, a French artist who worked for the Danish court. In 1709, after further training in Hamburg and Schwerin, he studied oil painting with Paul Heinecken in Lübeck. Following travels in Germany, Austria and Italy, he settled in Dresden and worked as a miniaturist.

Shortly after, he was baptized as a Lutheran. In 1714, he became a Court Painter to Augustus II, the King of Polish-Lithuanian Commonwealth and Elector of Saxony.

He made a study trip to Italy in 1718. There, he was impressed by the works of Raphael and Correggio. Later, when teaching his children, he employed the lessons he had learned from examining their works. His best-known offspring, Anton Rafael, was said to consider him a strict and often tyrannical teacher. He also had two daughters who became miniaturists. On several occasions, their training included study trips to Italy.

In addition to painting, he used his knowledge of chemistry to develop colors for the Meissen Porcelain manufactory. For several years, he taught at the drawing school there. In 1764, not long before his death, he was named an honorary professor at the newly established Academy of Fine Arts.

== Selected works ==
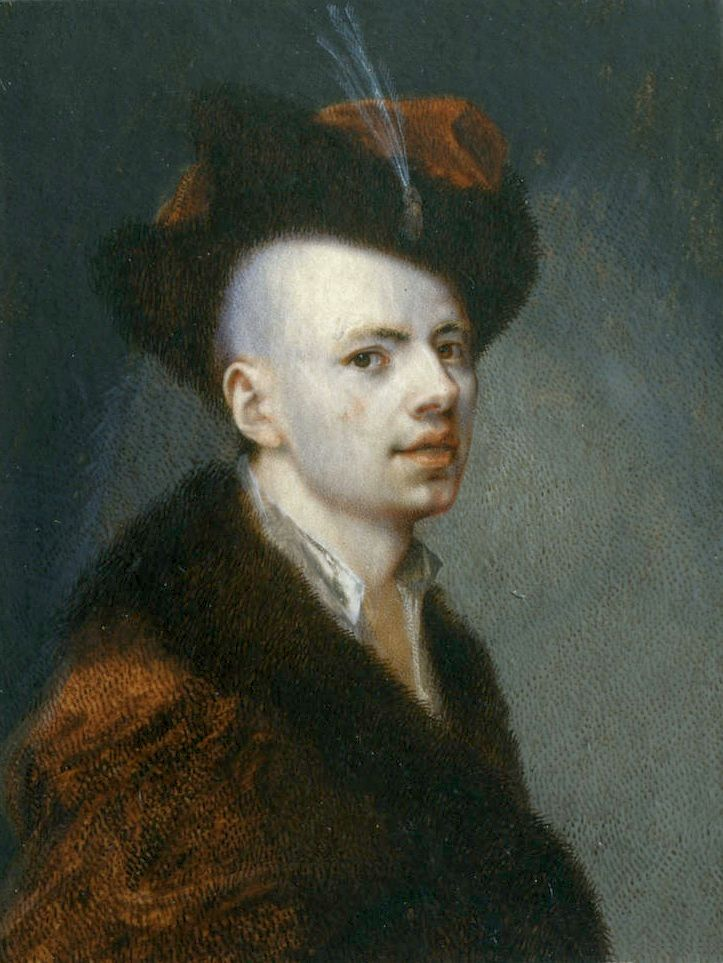
Self-portrait in Polish Costume (1710s)

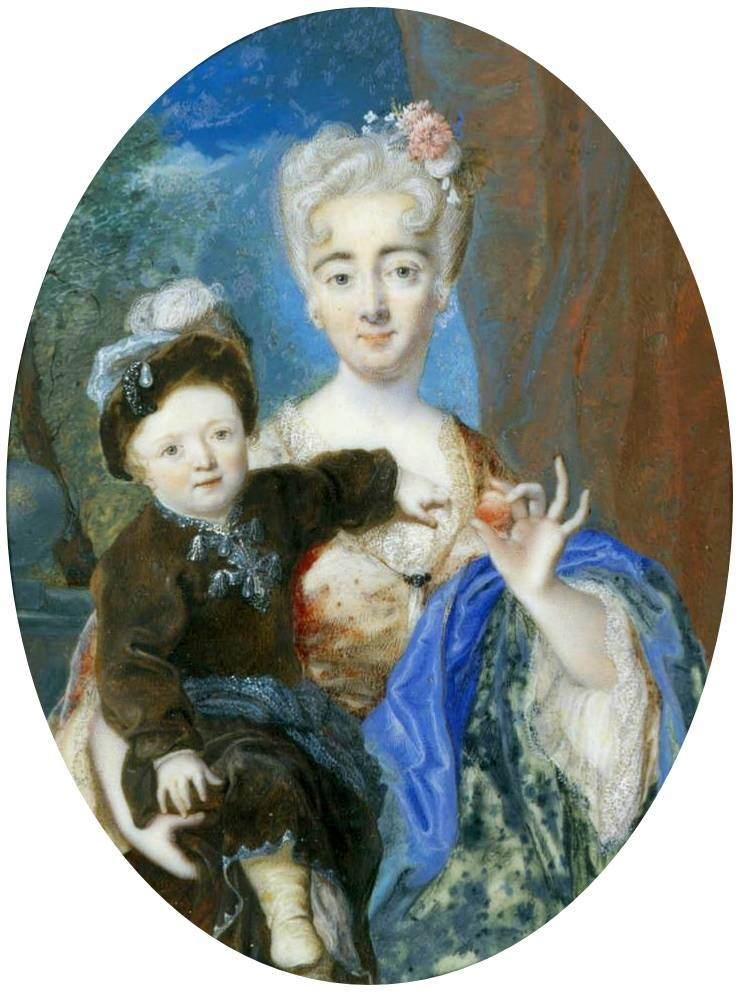
A Woman and her Son in Polish Costume

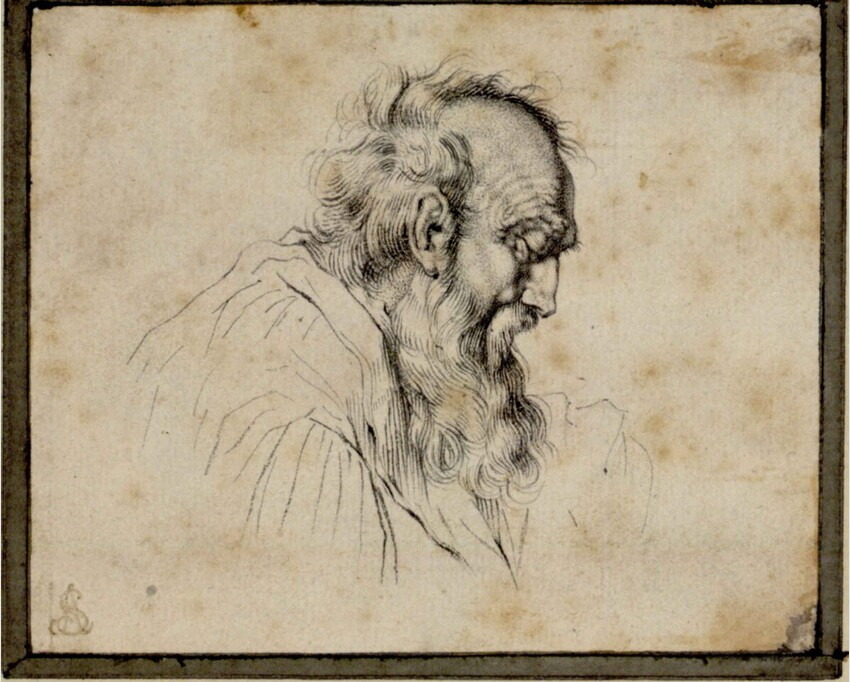
An Old Man's Head

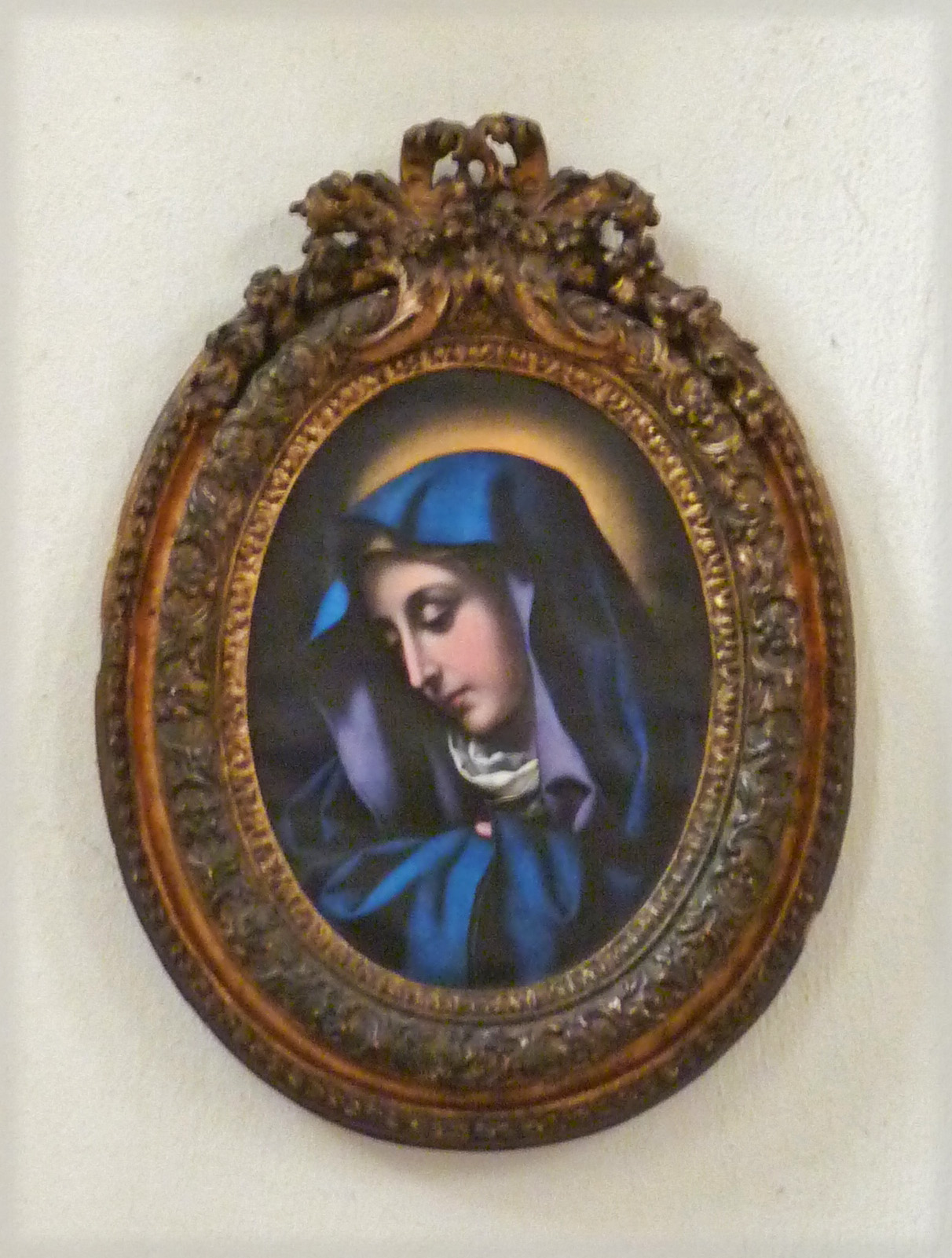
The Aussiger Madonna
