= Therese Concordia Maron =

German artist (1725–1806)

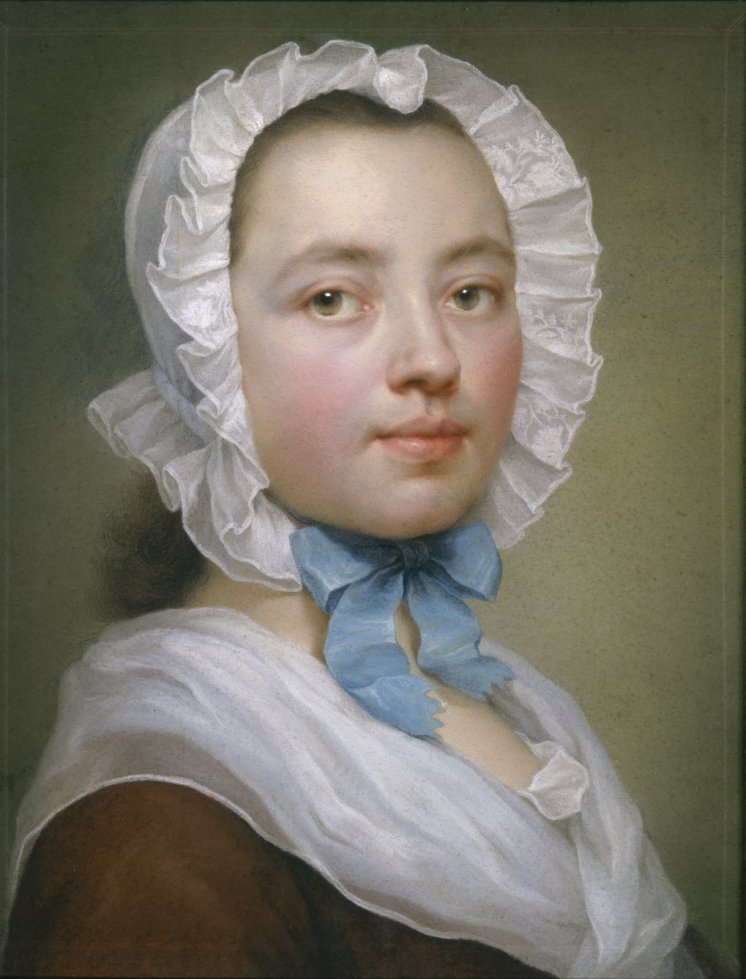
- Self-portrait in pastels (1745)
- Born: Therese Concordia Mengs; 1725; Ústí nad Labem, Bohemia, Habsburg Empire (now Czech Republic)
- Died: October 10, 1806 (aged 80–81); Rome, Papal States (now Italy)
- Occupation: Painter
- Spouse(s): Anton von Maron (m. 1765)
- Relatives: Anton Raphael Mengs (brother); Julia Charlotte Mengs (sister); Anna Maria Mengs (niece)

Therese Concordia Maron (née Mengs; 1725 – October 10, 1806) was a German painter. She was the elder sister of painter Anton Raphael Mengs.

== Life and work ==
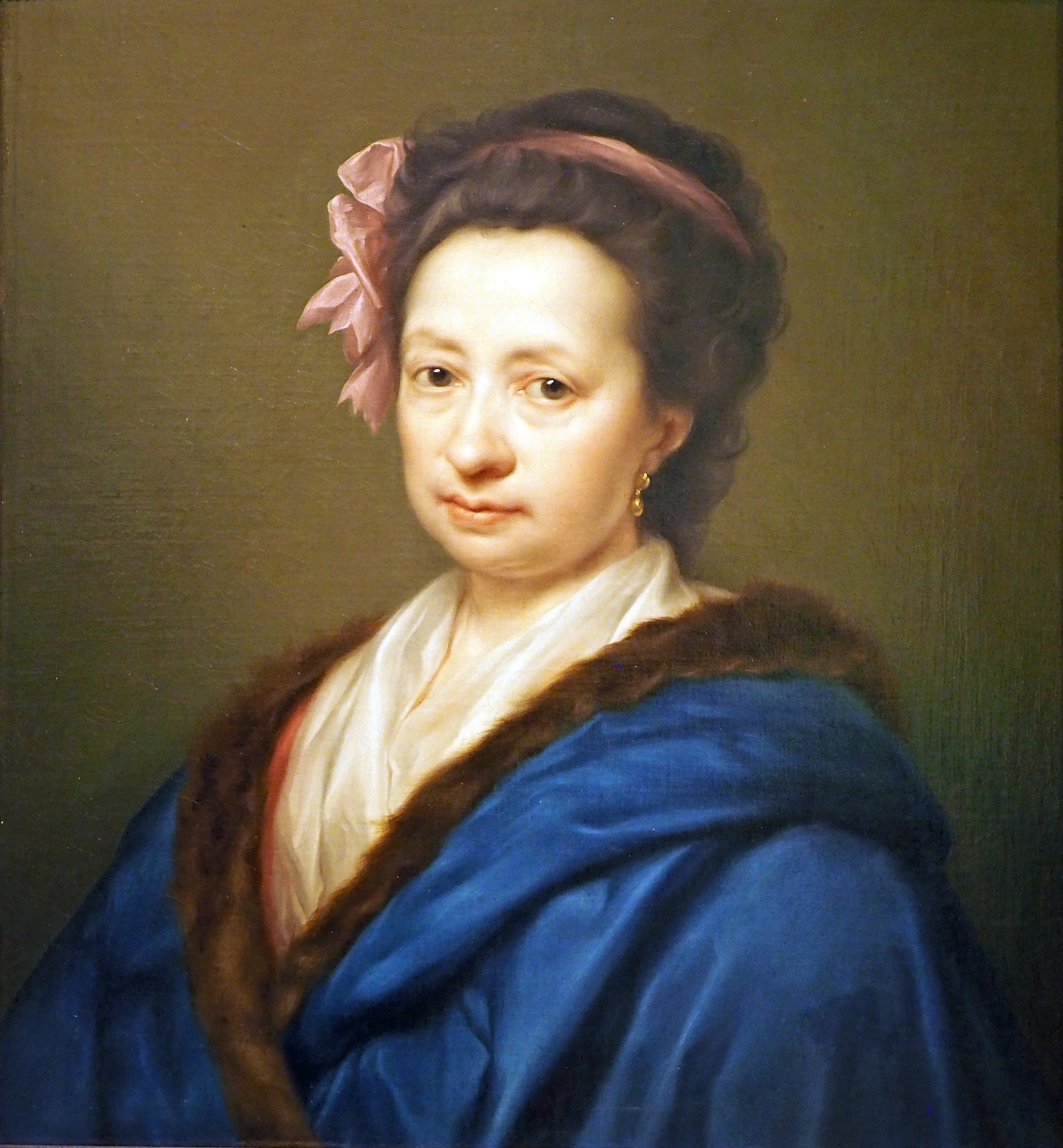
Portrait of Therese, circa 1789, by Anton von Maron

Mengs was born in the northern Bohemian town of Ústí nad Labem (German: Aussig) into the Lutheran family of Danish painter Ismael Mengs, a hofmaler (court painter) at the court of the Saxon-Polish electors and kings.

Her birth in Bohemia was coincidental. Her father maintained an extramarital relationship with his housekeeper, Charlotte Bormann. In an effort to conceal the birth of their illegitimate child, he decided to take her along with him on a "vacation" to the nearest bigger town abroad. There, she gave birth to daughter Therese Concordia. After a few weeks, Mengs took his child and her mother back to Dresden, the Saxon capital, where they lived. (Three years later he did the same to conceal the birth of his son, Anton Raphael).

At the age of sixteen, she moved with her family to Rome. From 1741, she worked as a miniaturist and pastel painter; producing a number of enamels and portraits, including a self-portrait and a portrait of her younger sister Julia. In 1765, she married Anton von Maron, an Austrian-born portrait painter and pupil of her brother. She died in Rome in 1806.

Maron was also active as a teacher. Among her pupils were Apollonia Seydelmann, her niece Anna Maria Mengs, and Sofia Clerc.

== See also ==
- List of German women artists
