= Marketing Executives Network Group =

Marketing Executives Networking Group
- Abbreviation: MENG
- Formation: 1995
- Type: Non-profit
- Purpose: Marketing profession
- Location: Primarily United States membership with local chapters
- Region served: Global digital online networking group
- Members: 1,800+ (as of 29 April 2009)
- Official language: English
- Website: www.mengonline.com

The Marketing Executives Networking Group (MENG) is a non-profit professional association established in 1995 for small business, consultant, corporate executive-level marketing managers in leadership roles at companies and non-profit organizations across many diverse industries and areas of marketing expertise.

== Organization ==
=== Membership ===
Members are a diverse group from a variety of industries with a focus on marketing. Members are typically:

- currently hold, or have held the position of vice president, senior vice president, chief marketing officer, chief operating officer or president
- Currently 84% have Fortune 500 experience
- 70% have graduate or post-graduate degrees
- Over 50% of members with graduate and post-graduate degrees received them from top-20 Business Schools
- Over 21% of members have attended an Ivy League school

=== Structure ===
The organization consists of a governance board of directors and currently has fourteen (14) local chapters in major cities in the continental United States. Local chapters provide a regional and local forum and opportunity for members to meet, engage and network with other executive-level marketing professionals. A web based forum also provides an exchange point for special interest groups to discuss category-specific news and exchange ideas. Newer forms of social media are also utilized including LinkedIn (with over 1200 members) and Twitter

=== Service ===
Members contribute to their industries through textbooks and other books they have authored and white papers as well. The group also provides outreach through a distinguished lecturer series program and speakers bureau on a variety of marketing topics. A comprehensive online training program in the form of The MENG Webinar Series is offered. Past and current topics have included: Social Media University, Marketing Masters, Career Maximization, and Innovation.

=== Leadership ===
Members elect the National Board of Directors every year, including the National Chairman - Richard Guha (2001-2007), Richard Sellers (2007-2011) and Joey Iazzetto (2011-present). Individual chapters each nominate their own Chapter Chair and local leadership.

=== Research and Education ===
The organization is perhaps best known for its research including the annual Marketing Trends Survey which captures marketing leaders' perspectives on the coming year and published in leading marketing trade journals such as Crain Communications' Advertising Age and BtoBonline.com. This survey has been produced and published by MENG, along with Anderson Analytics since 2007. Its findings are often cited as references in digital media and print.

The group also partners with others on topics and factors affecting the marketing profession including employment prospects, job satisfaction and executive compensation. The Economist (print and online). Pace University, and PM Network (the monthly magazine of the Project Management Institute) referenced MENG research and its leadership position in the area of augmenting and accelerating traditional market research with a new methodology called open innovation and crowdsourcing.

=== Honors and awards ===
The organization is the official marketing partner of the 2009 Edison Best New Product Awards for innovation and advancement in products and services. The first recipients under the new partnership were awarded on 1 April 2009 in a variety of categories and industries.

== See also ==
- American Marketing Association
- Direct Marketing Association
