= Anton Raphael Mengs =

German painter (1728–1779)

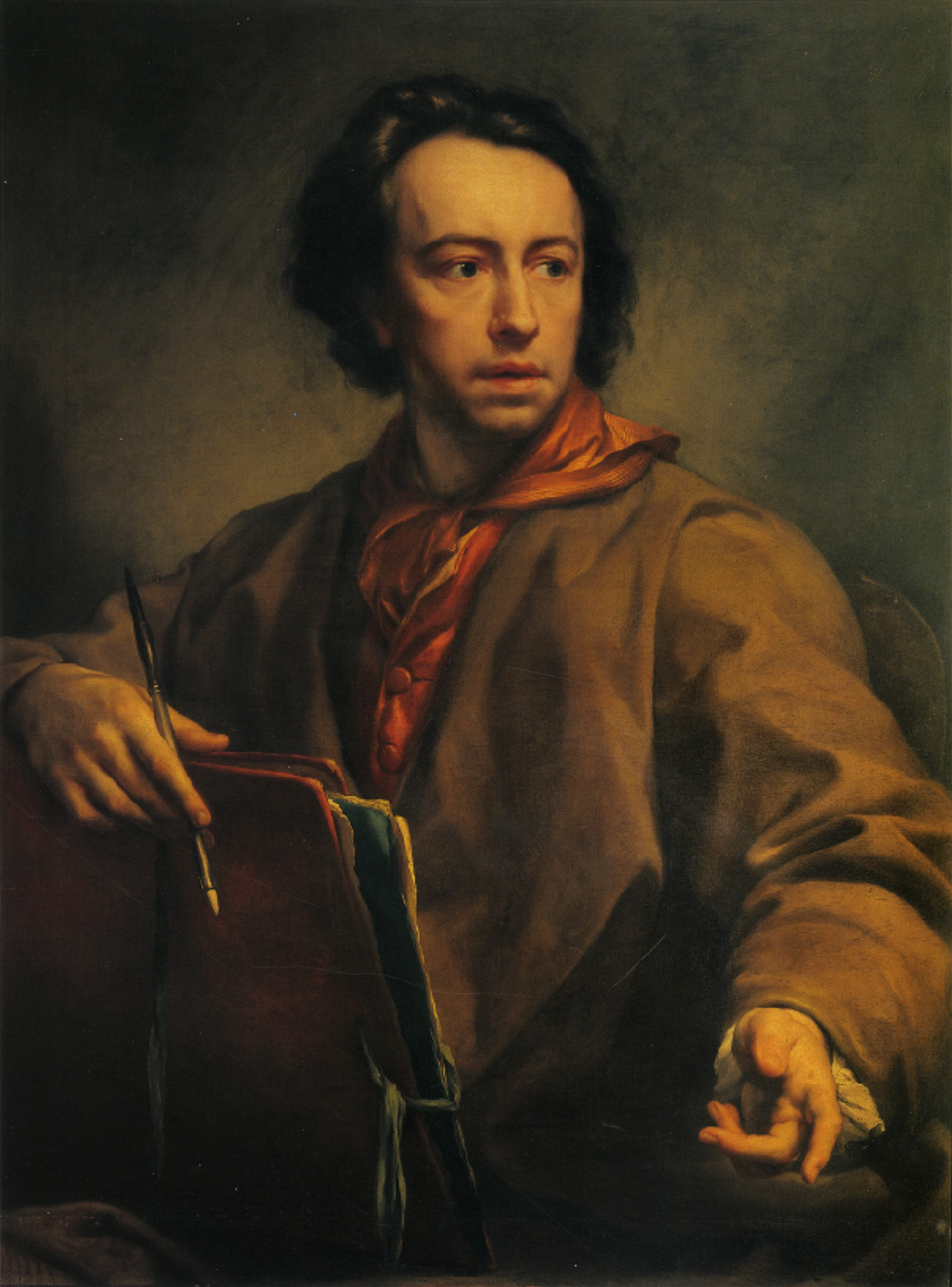
- Self-Portrait, c. 1775, Uffizi, Florence
- Born: 12 March 1728; Ústí nad Labem, Bohemia, Habsburg Empire
- Died: 29 June 1779 (aged 51); Rome, Papal States
- Occupation: Painter
- Movement: Neoclassical
- Children: Anna Maria Mengs
- Father: Ismael Mengs
- Relatives: Therese Mengs (sister); Julia Charlotte Mengs (sister)

Anton Raphael Mengs (12 March 1728 – 29 June 1779) was a Czech-Born German Neoclassical painter of Danish descent.

== Early life ==
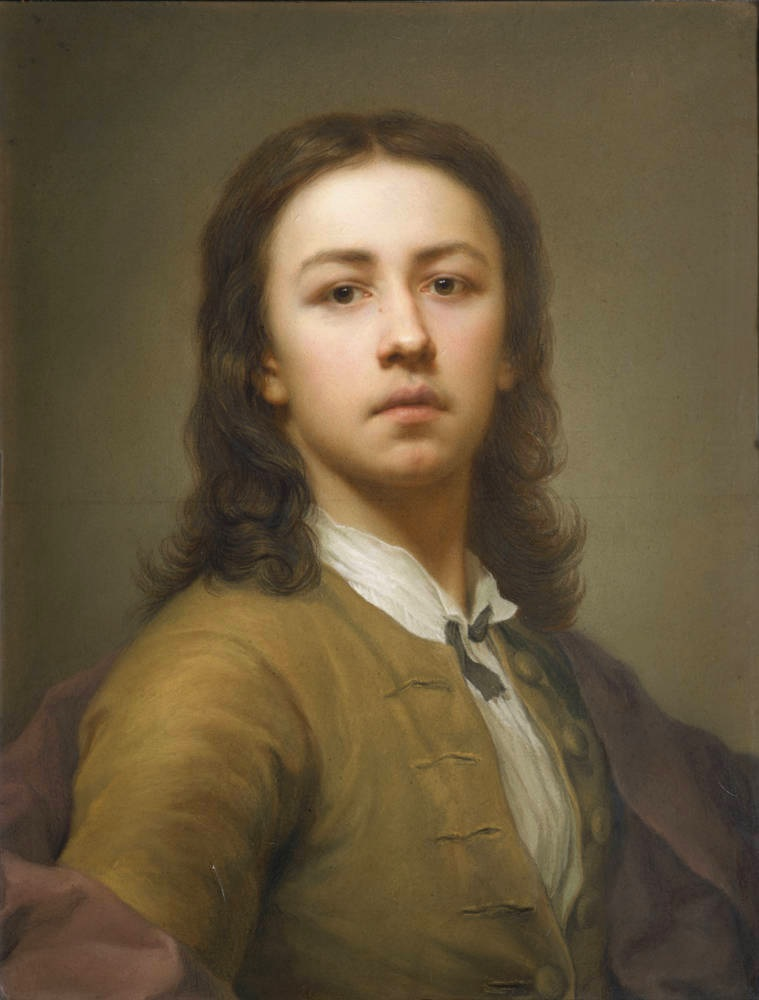
Self-portrait, 1744

Mengs was born on 12 March 1728, at Ústí nad Labem in the Kingdom of Bohemia, the son of Ismael Mengs, a Danish-born painter who eventually established himself at Dresden, where the court of Electorate of Saxony and Polish-Lithuanian Commonwealth electors and kings was. His older sister, Therese Concordia Maron, was also a painter, as was his younger sister, Julia.

His and Therese's births in Bohemia were mere coincidence. Their mother was not their father's wife; Ismael carried on a years-long affair with the family's housekeeper, Charlotte Bormann. In an effort to conceal the births of two illegitimate children, Ismael took Charlotte, under the pretext of "vacations", to the nearest bigger town abroad, Ústí nad Labem (90 km upstream of the Elbe river). At least in Anton's case, Ismael Mengs took his baby and Charlotte back to Dresden a few weeks after the birth. There they lived for the next 13 years.

In 1741, Ismael moved his family from Dresden to Rome, where he copied in miniature some works of Raphael for the Elector of Saxony, which were intended for Dresden.

== Adulthood ==
In 1749, Anton Raphael Mengs was appointed the first painter to Frederick Augustus, Elector of Saxony, but this did not prevent him from continuing to spend much of his time in Rome. There he married Margarita Guazzi, who had sat for him as a model in 1748. In 1749, Mengs accepted a commission from the Duke of Northumberland to make a copy, in oil on canvas, of Raphael's fresco The School of Athens for his London home. Executed in 1752–5, Mengs's painting is full-sized, but he adapted the composition to a rectangular format and added other figures. It is now in the collection of the Victoria and Albert Museum.

He converted to Catholicism, and in 1754 he became director of the Vatican painting school. In 1757, Mengs painted a superb fresco on the dome of the church of Sant'Eusebio in Rome. His fresco painting Parnassus at Villa Albani gained him a reputation as a master painter.

On two occasions he accepted invitations from Charles III of Spain to go to Madrid, first in 1761. There he produced some of his best work, most notably the ceiling of the banqueting hall of the Royal Palace of Madrid, the subject of which was the Triumph of Trajan and the Temple of Glory. After the completion of this work in 1777, Mengs returned to Rome, where he died two years later, in poor circumstances, leaving twenty children, seven of whom were pensioned by the king of Spain.

Mengs died in Rome in June 1779 and was buried there in the Church of Santi Michele e Magno.

== Career ==
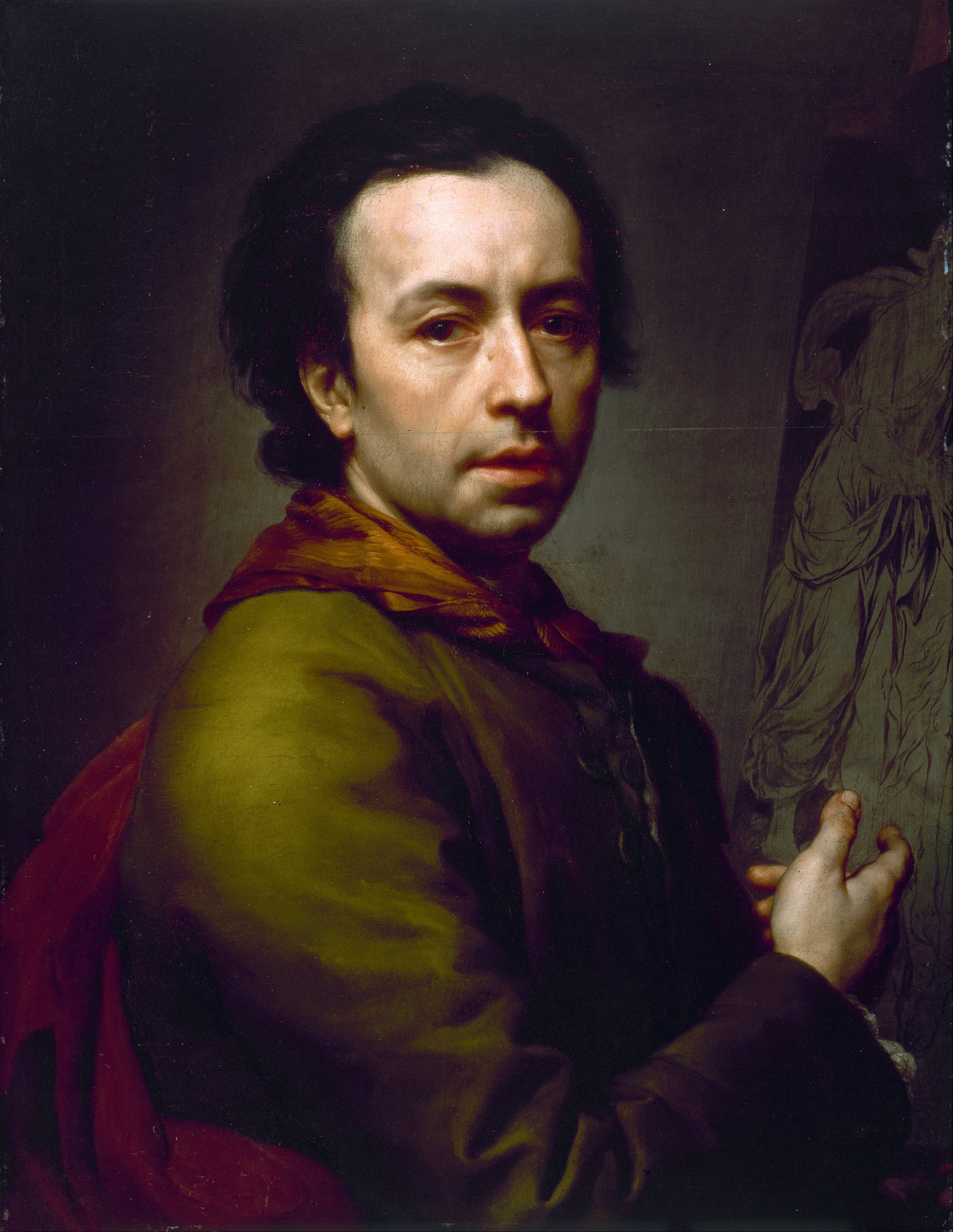
Self-Portrait, 1774 (on display at the Walker Art Gallery, Liverpool)

His portraits and self-portraits show an attention to detail and insight often lost in his grander paintings. His closeness to Johann Joachim Winckelmann has enhanced his historical importance. Mengs came to share Winckelmann's enthusiasm for classical antiquity, and worked to establish the dominance of Neoclassical painting over the then popular Rococo style. At the same time, however, the influence of the Roman Baroque remained strong in his work, particularly in his religious paintings. He would have fancied himself the first neoclassicist, while, in fact, he may be the last flicker of Baroque art. Rudolf Wittkower wrote: "In the last analysis, he is as much an end as a beginning". Goethe regretted that "so much learning should have been allied to a total want of initiative and poverty of invention, and embodied with a strained and artificial mannerism."

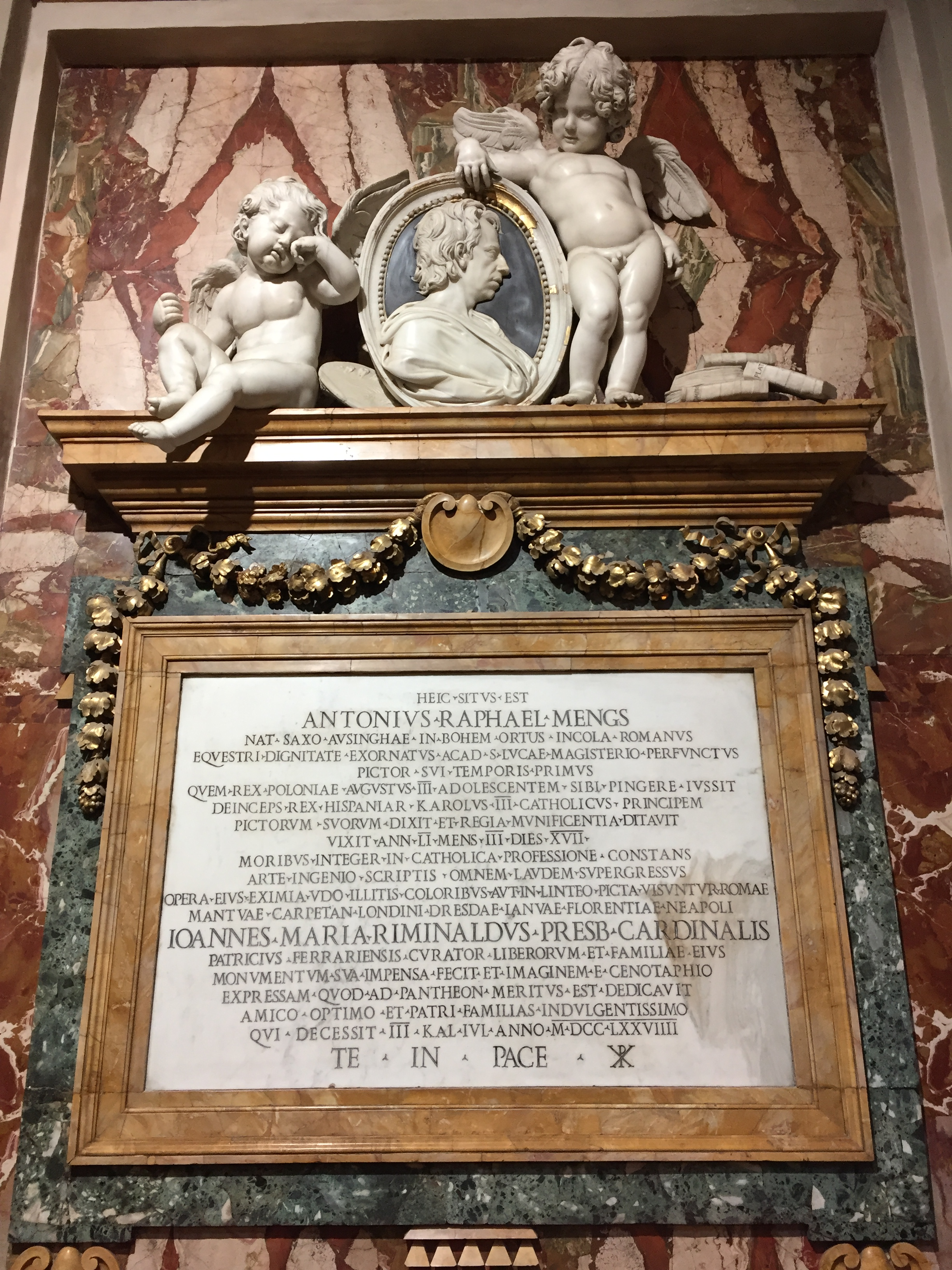
Mengs's grave in Rome

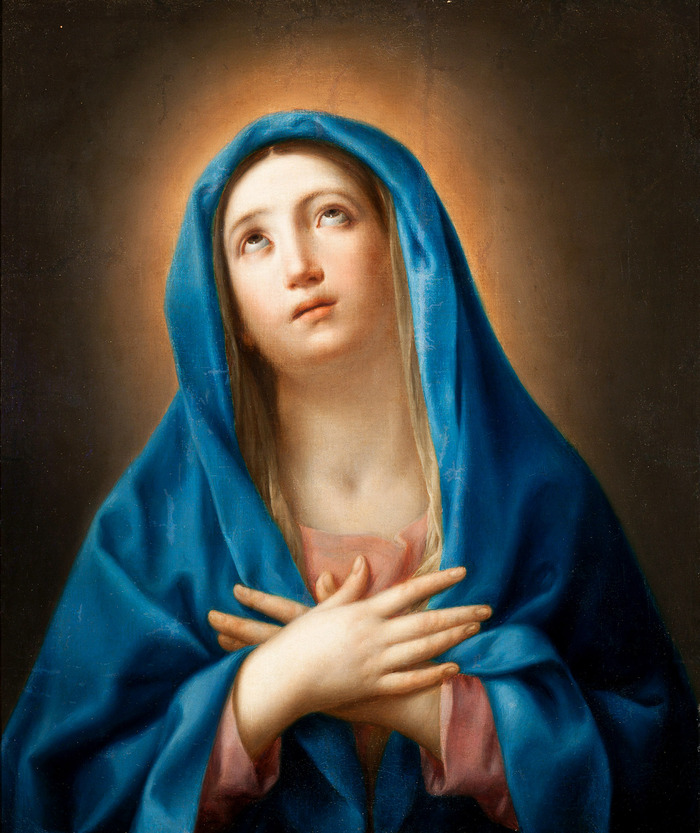
Our Lady of Sorrows (1765–1769), Museo Camón Aznar

Mengs had a well-known rivalry with the contemporary Italian painter Pompeo Batoni. He was also a friend of Giacomo Casanova. Casanova provides accounts of his personality and contemporary reputation through anecdotes in his Histoire de ma vie. Among his pupils in Italy were Anton von Maron (Antonio Maron; (Vienna, 1731- Naples, 1761). His pupils in Spain included Agustín Esteve, Francisco Bayeu and Mariano Salvador Maella.

Besides numerous paintings in Madrid, the Ascension and St Joseph at Dresden, Perseus and Andromeda at Saint Petersburg, and the ceiling of the Villa Albani are among his chief works. A Noli me tangere was commissioned as an altar-piece by All Souls College, Oxford, and is now held in the National Gallery, London. Another altar-piece was installed in Magdalen College, Oxford.

=== Theoretical writings ===
Mengs wrote about art in Spanish, Italian, and German. His friendship with Winckelmann notwithstanding, Mengs was little influenced by Winckelmann's ideas; the basis of his extensive writings on art is to be found in the traditional theories that go back to Bellori. He reveals an eclectic theory of art that sees perfection as attainable through a well-balanced fusion of diverse excellences: Greek design combined with the expression of Raphael, the chiaroscuro of Correggio, and the colour of Titian. All his theories and opinions (as well as biography) are in his 646 paged works, which were translated into English.

== Selected works ==
- Ascension (Dresden, Court Church), 1751/1766
- St Joseph (Dresden, Court Church), 1751/1766
- The Glory of Saint Eusebius (ceiling fresco, Sant'Eusebio, Rome), 1757 (modello, oil on canvas, National Gallery of Canada Ottawa)
- Portrait of Ferdinand I (National Museum of Capodimonte, Naples, Italy), 1759
- Charles III (Museo del Prado, Madrid), 1761
- Infante Don Louis de Borbon (Cleveland Museum of Art, Cleveland, Ohio)

== Gallery ==
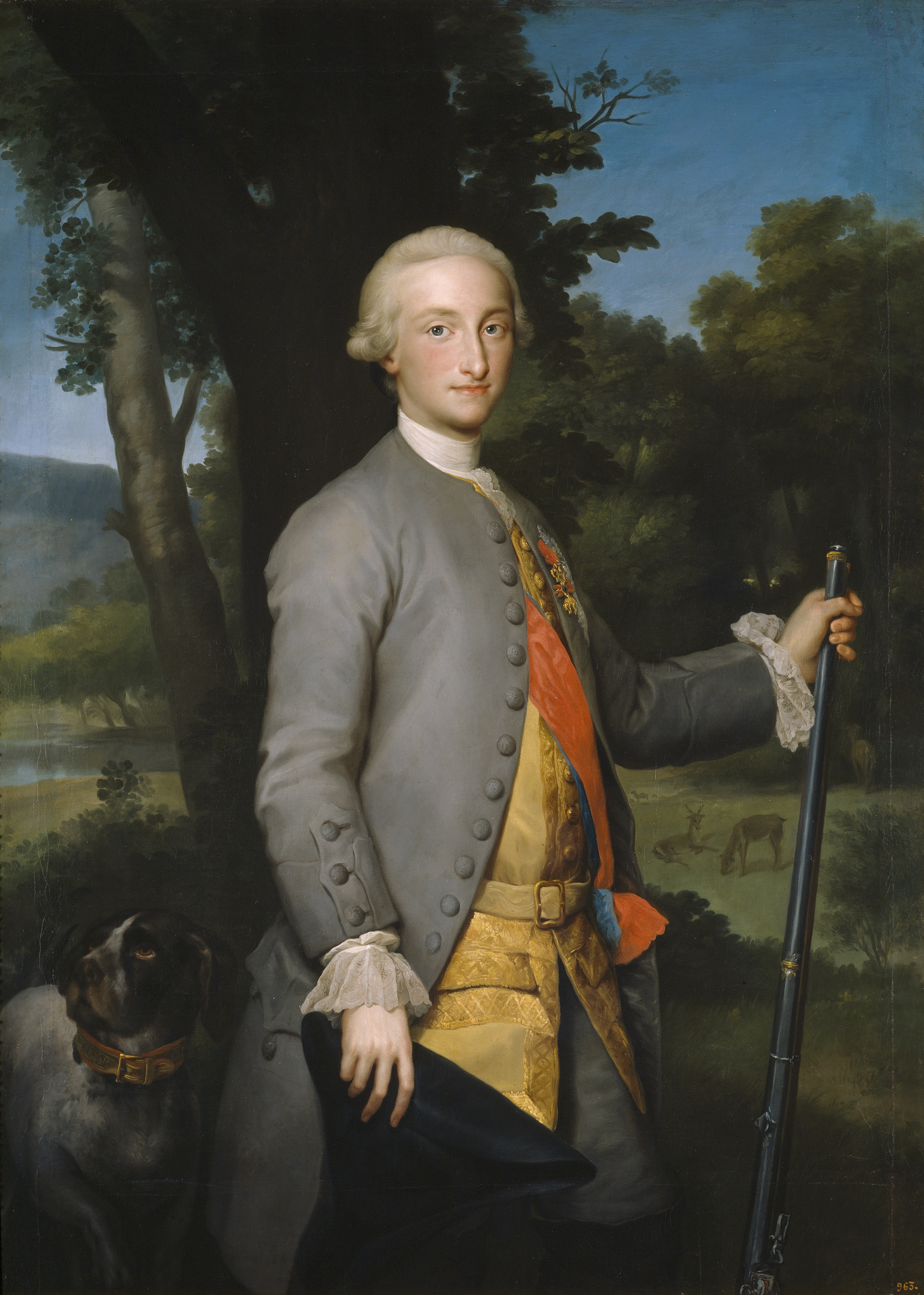
Prince of Asturias, Future Charles IV of Spain (са. 1765)

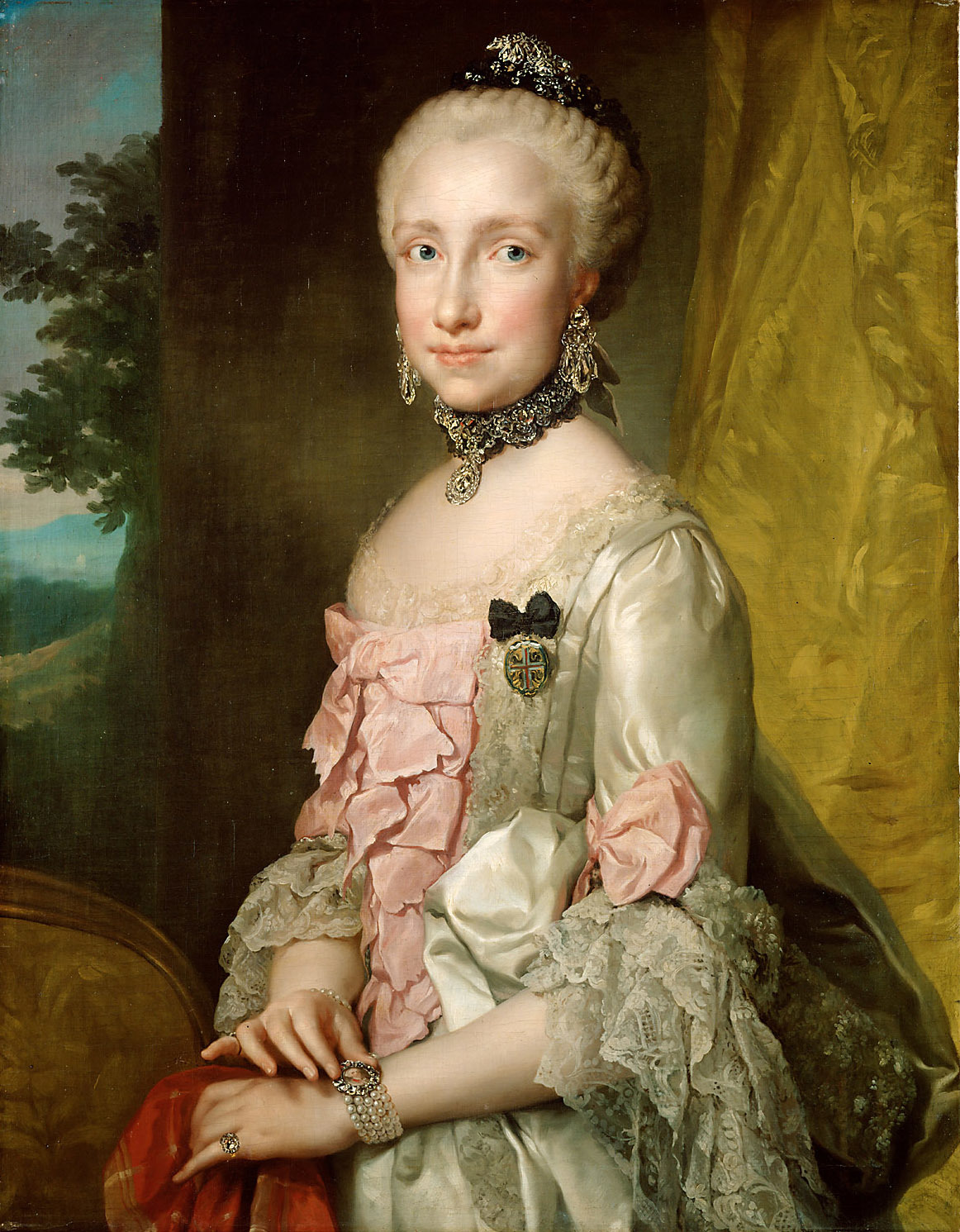
Portrait of Maria Luisa of Spain

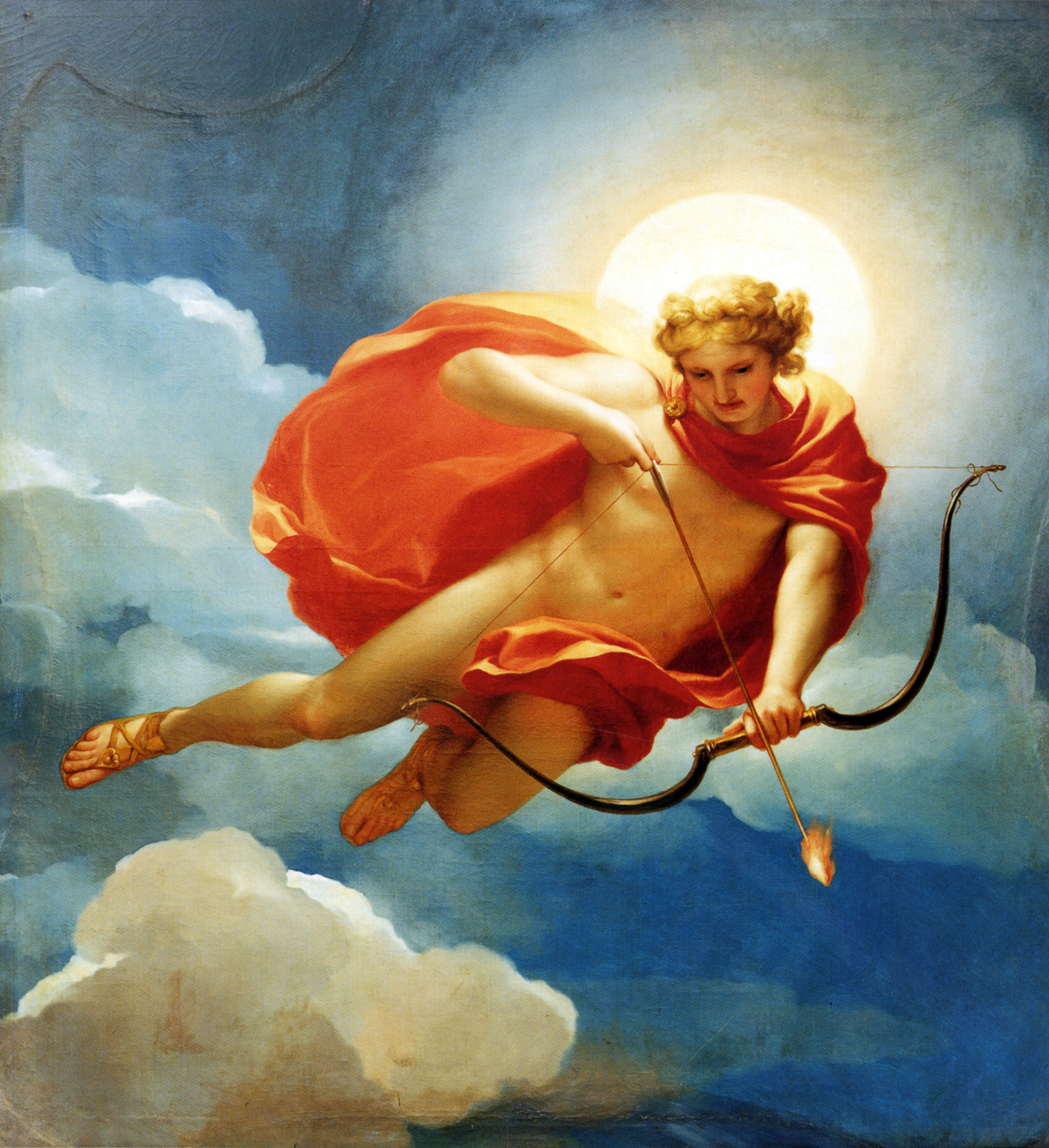
Helios as Personification of Midday (ca. 1765)

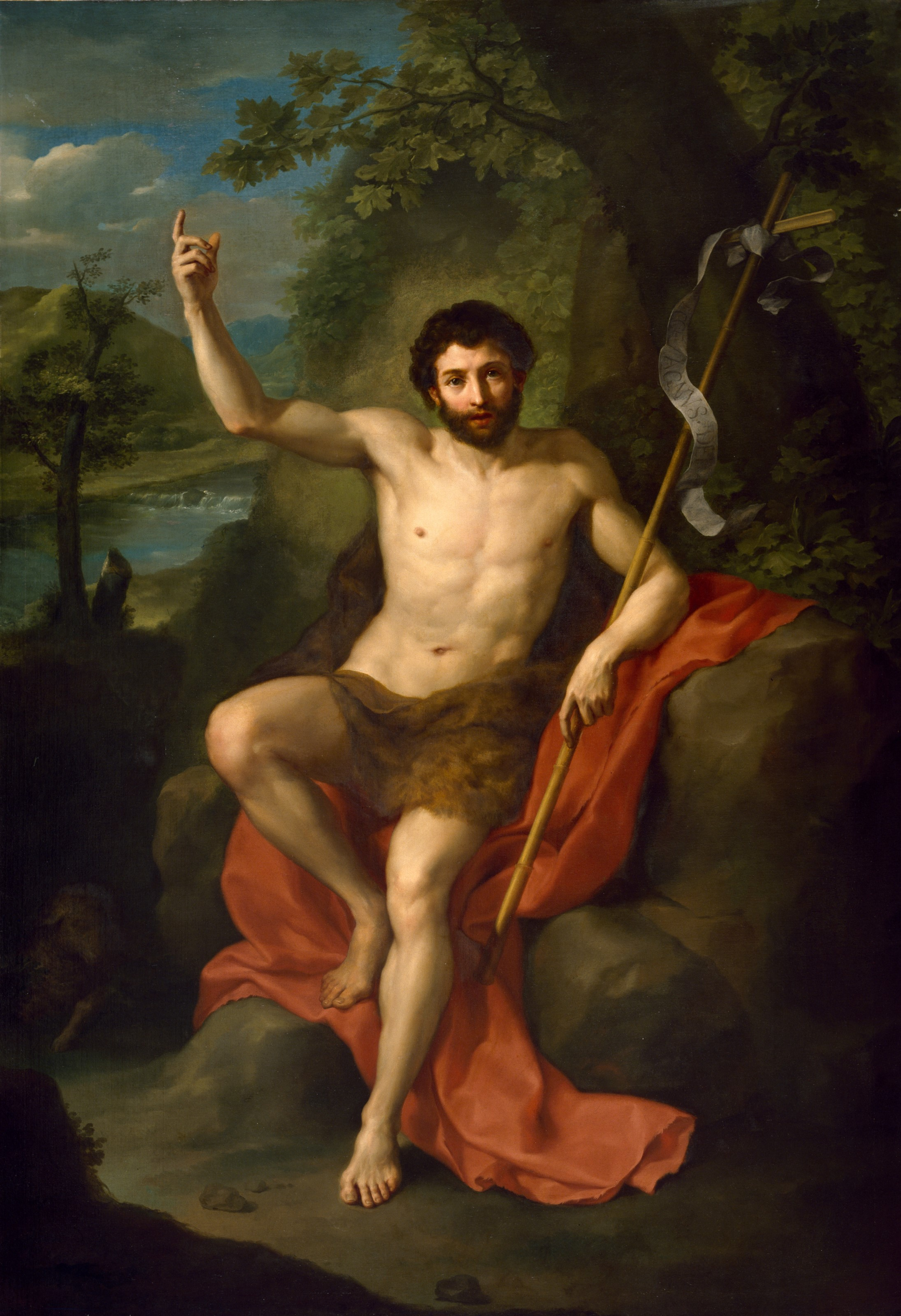
St. John the Baptist Preaching in the Wilderness

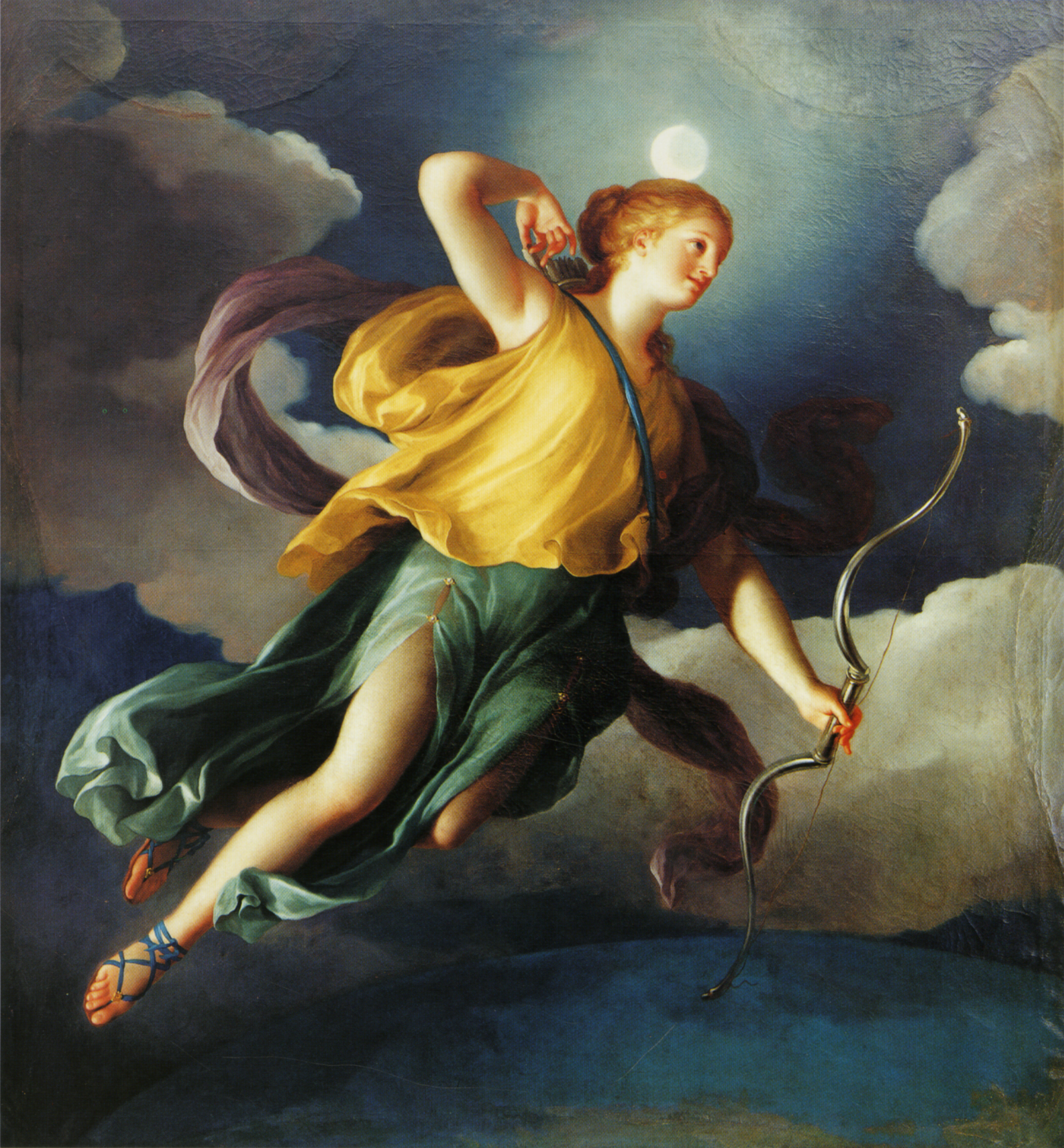
Diana as Personification of the Night (ca. 1765)

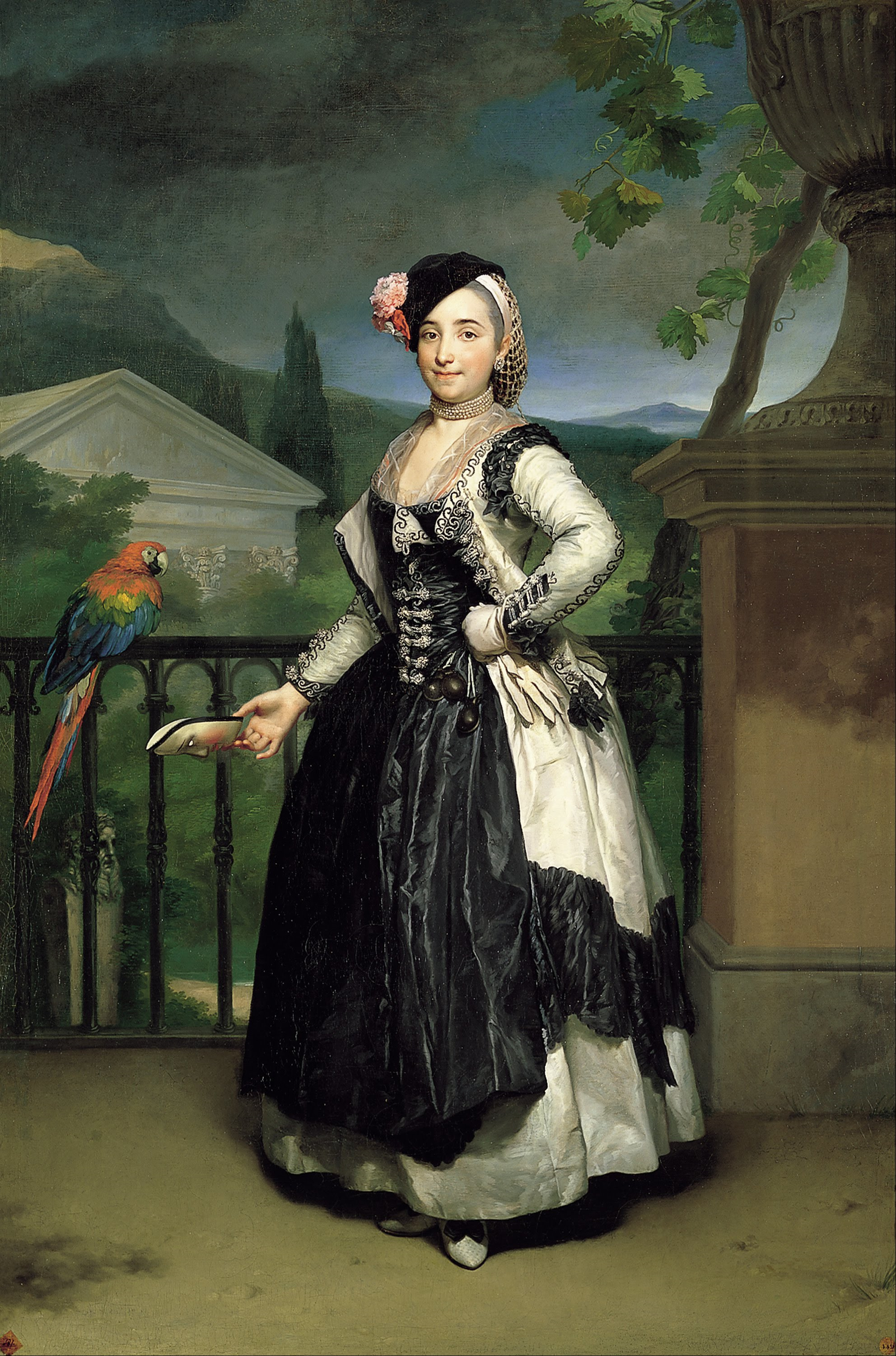
La marquesa de Llano (ca. 1775)

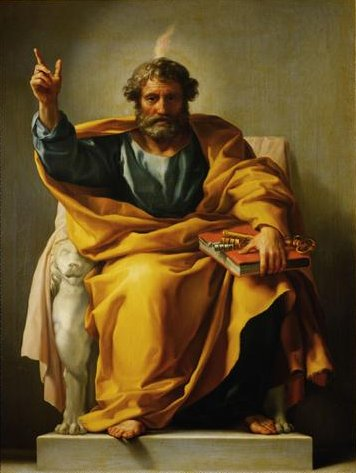
Saint Peter

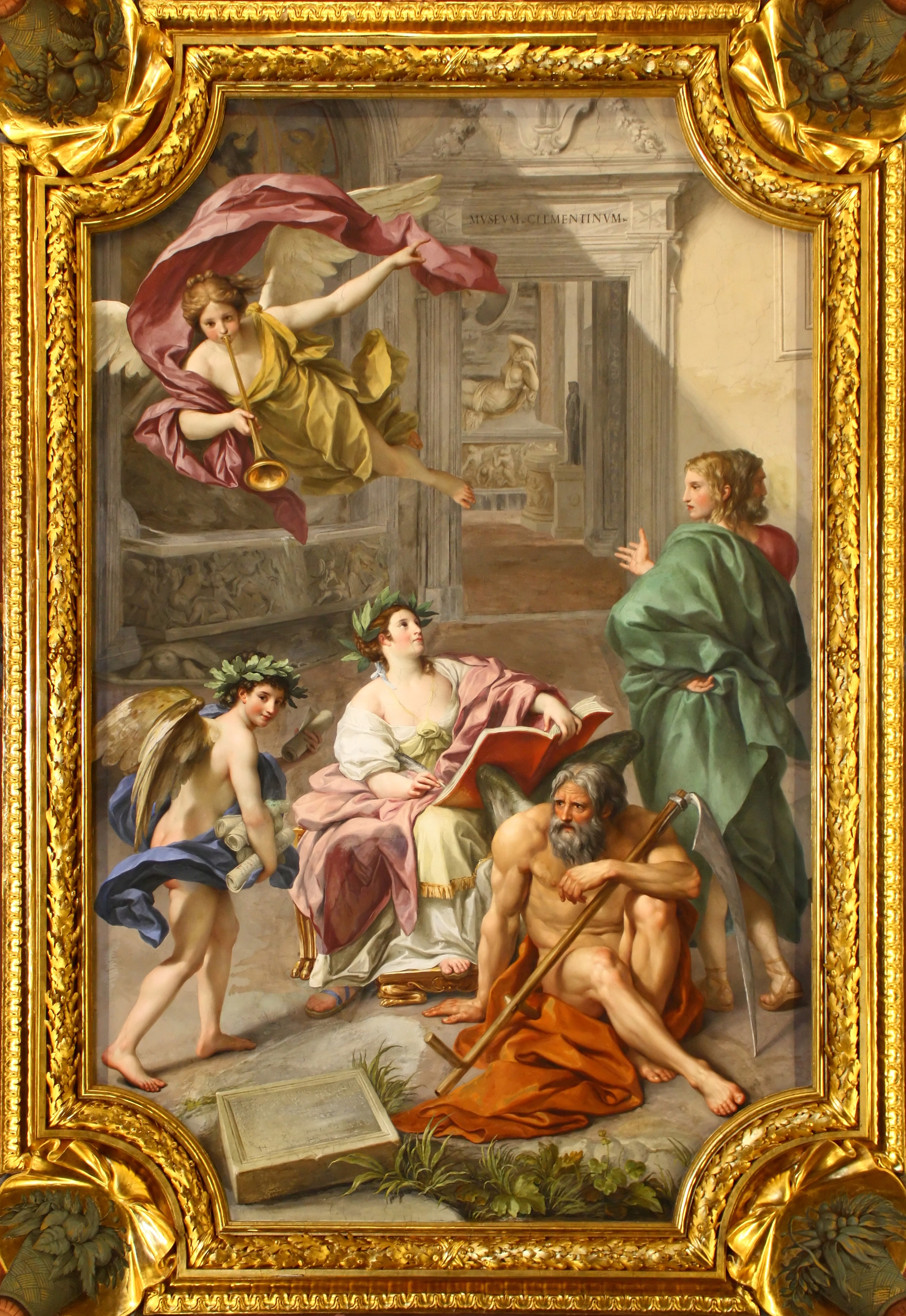
The Triumph of History over Time, ceiling Vatican Library.

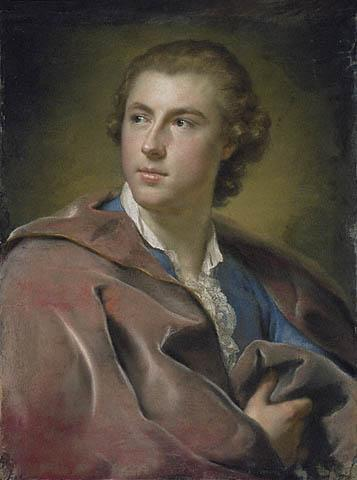
Portrait of William Burton Conyngham (1733–1796)

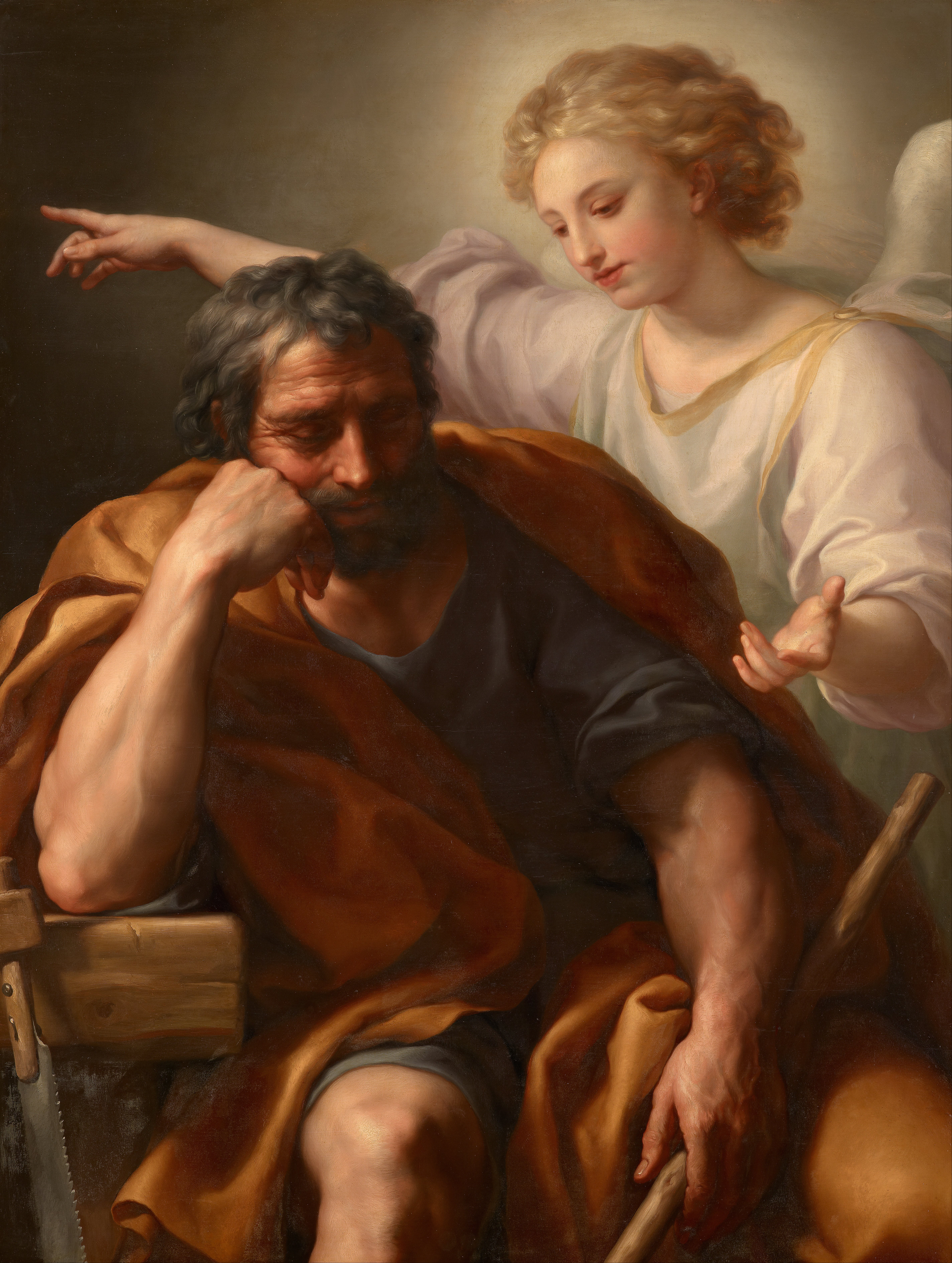
The Dream of St. Joseph (ca. 1774)

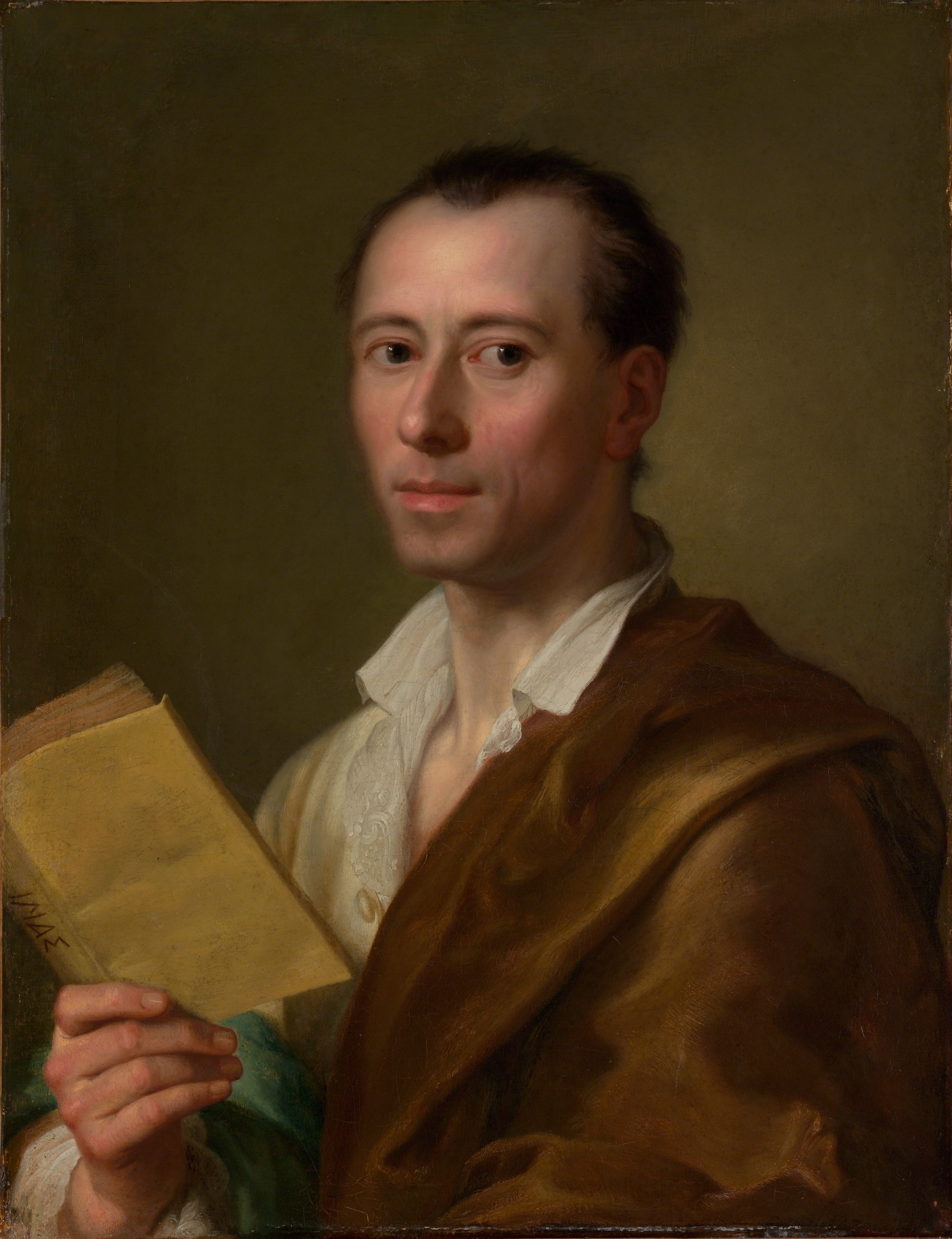
Johann Joachim Winckelmann at the Metropolitan Museum of Art (ca. 1777)

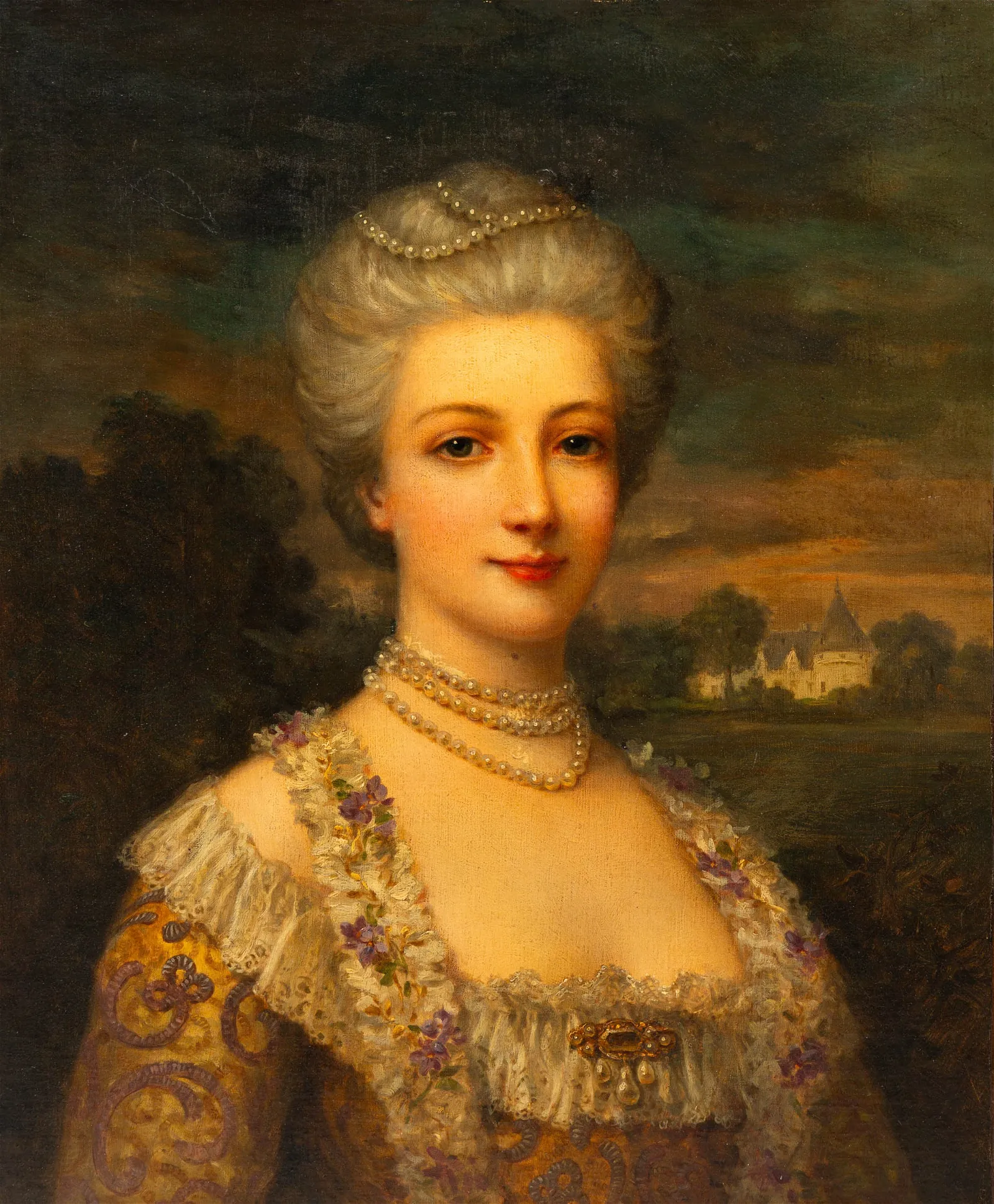
Portrait of an Elegant Lady (1775), Germany

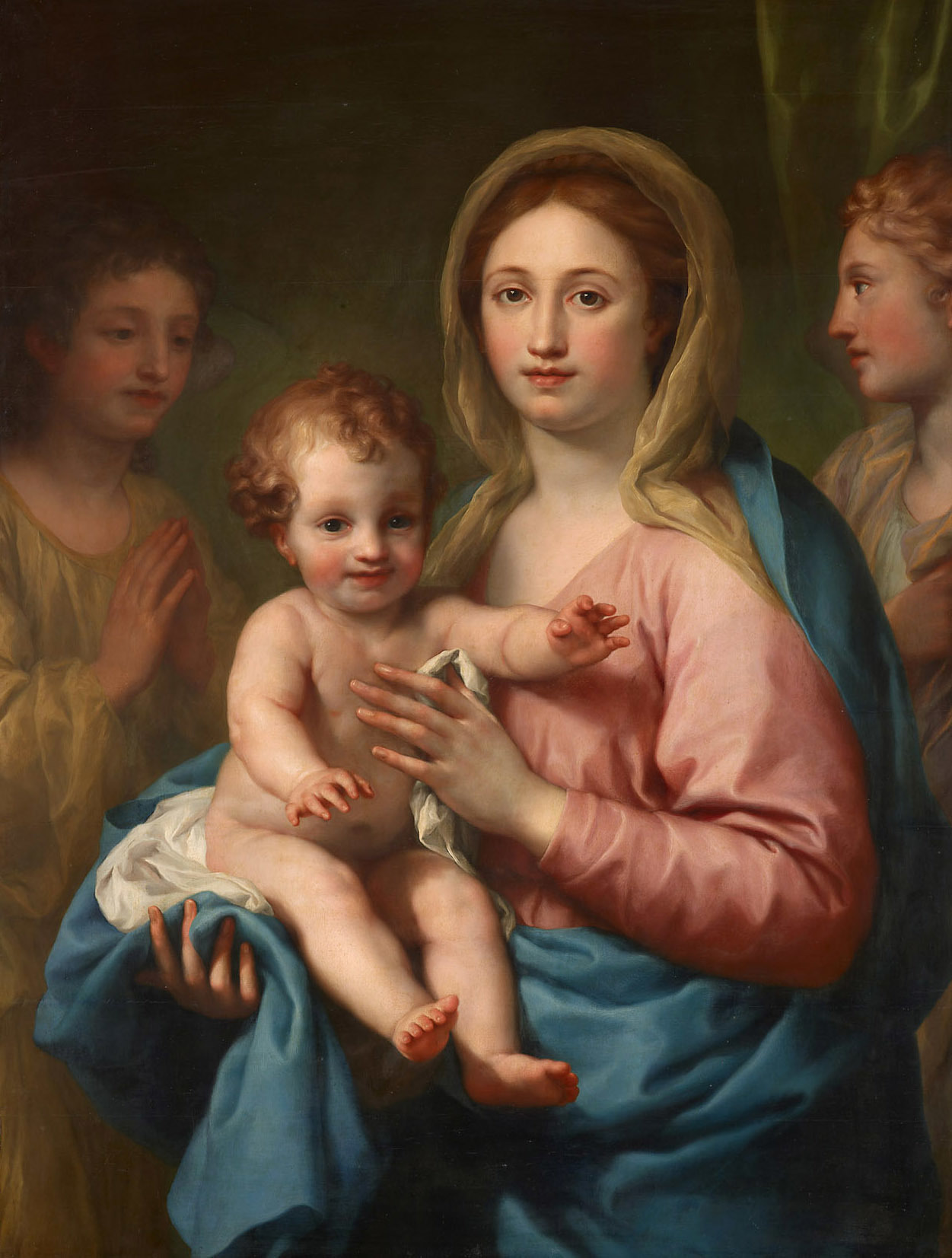
Madonna with Child and Two Angels (1770–1773), Kunsthistorisches Museum

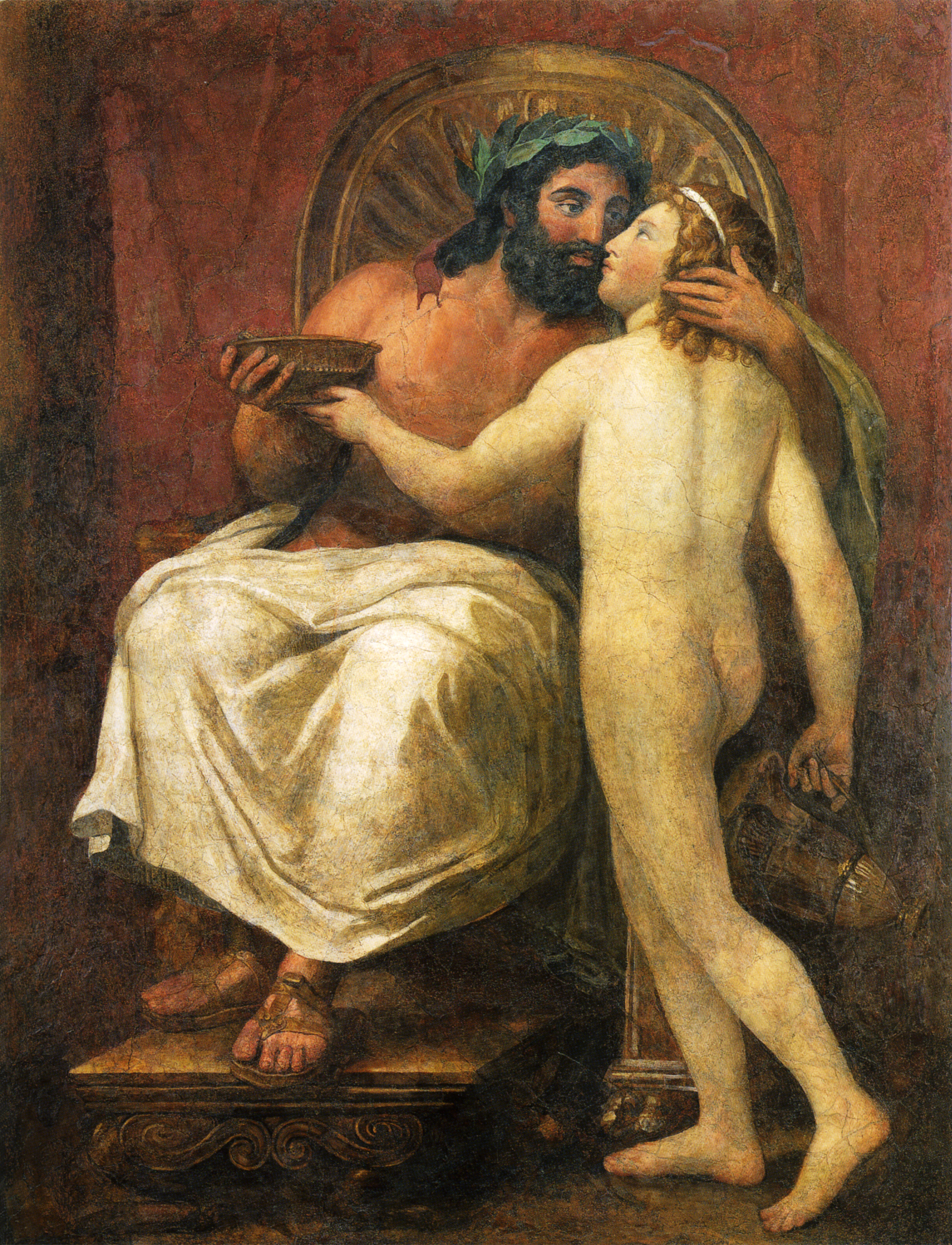
Jupiter Kissing Ganymede (1760), Galleria Nazionale d'Arte Antica

== Sources ==
- Wittkower, Rudolf (1993). "Art and Architecture Italy, 1600–1750". Pelican History of Art. 1980. Penguin Books Ltd. p. 469.
- Herbermann, Charles, ed. (1913). "Anthon Rafael Mengs" . Catholic Encyclopedia. New York: Robert Appleton Company.
- Neil Jeffares, Dictionary of pastellists before 1800, online edition
- Paintings by Anton Raphael Mengs at WikiGallery.org
