= Anna Maria Mengs =

German artist (1751–1792)

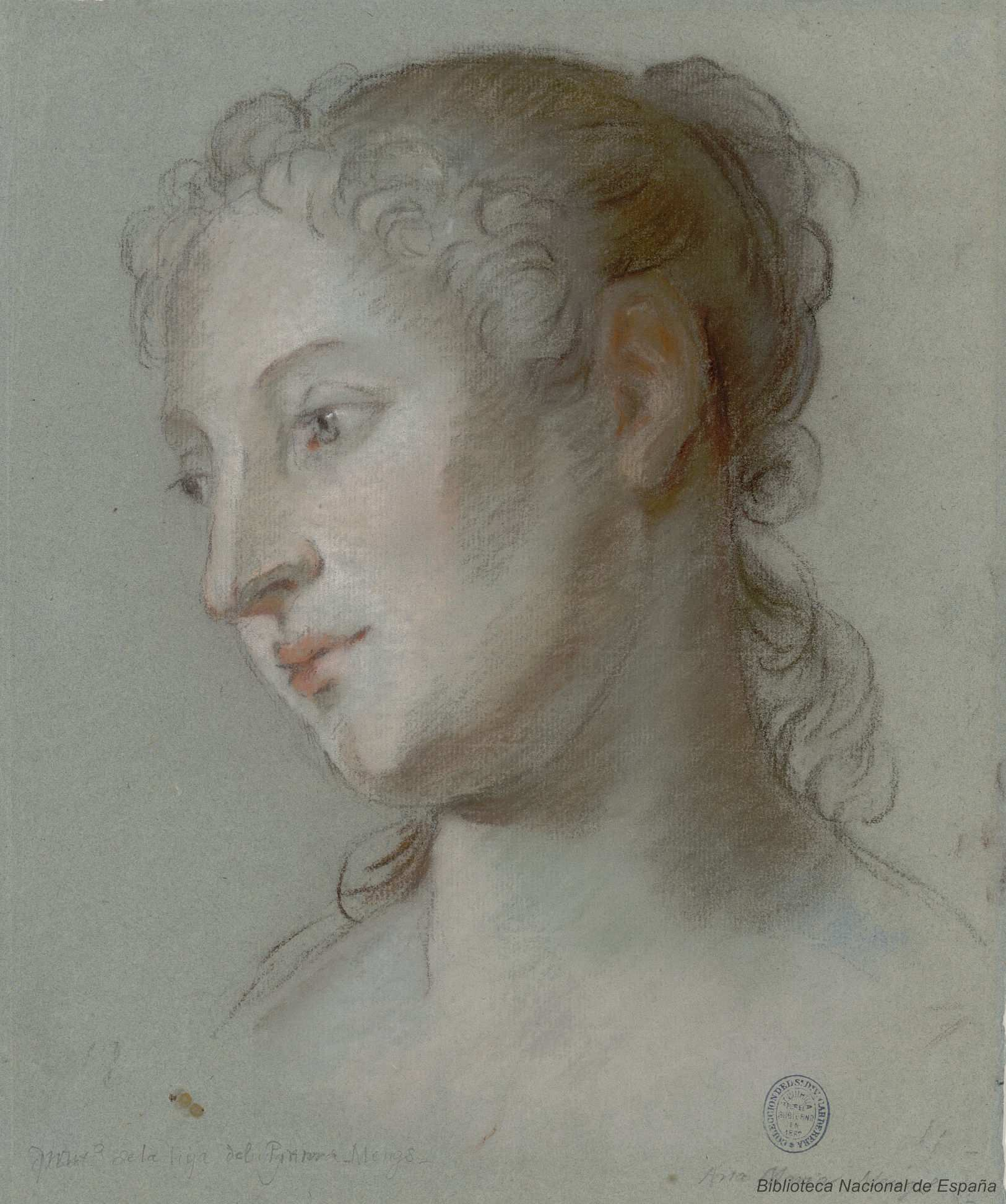
- Anna Maria Mengs, selfportrait.
- Born: Anna Maria Mengs; 1751; Dresden, Saxony, Holy Roman Empire
- Died: 29 October 1792 (aged 40–41); Madrid, Spain
- Occupation: Painter
- Spouse(s): Manuel Salvador Carmona (m. 1777)
- Children: 7
- Parent(s): Anton Raphael Mengs; Margarita Guazzi
- Relatives: Therese Mengs (aunt); Julia Charlotte Mengs (aunt)

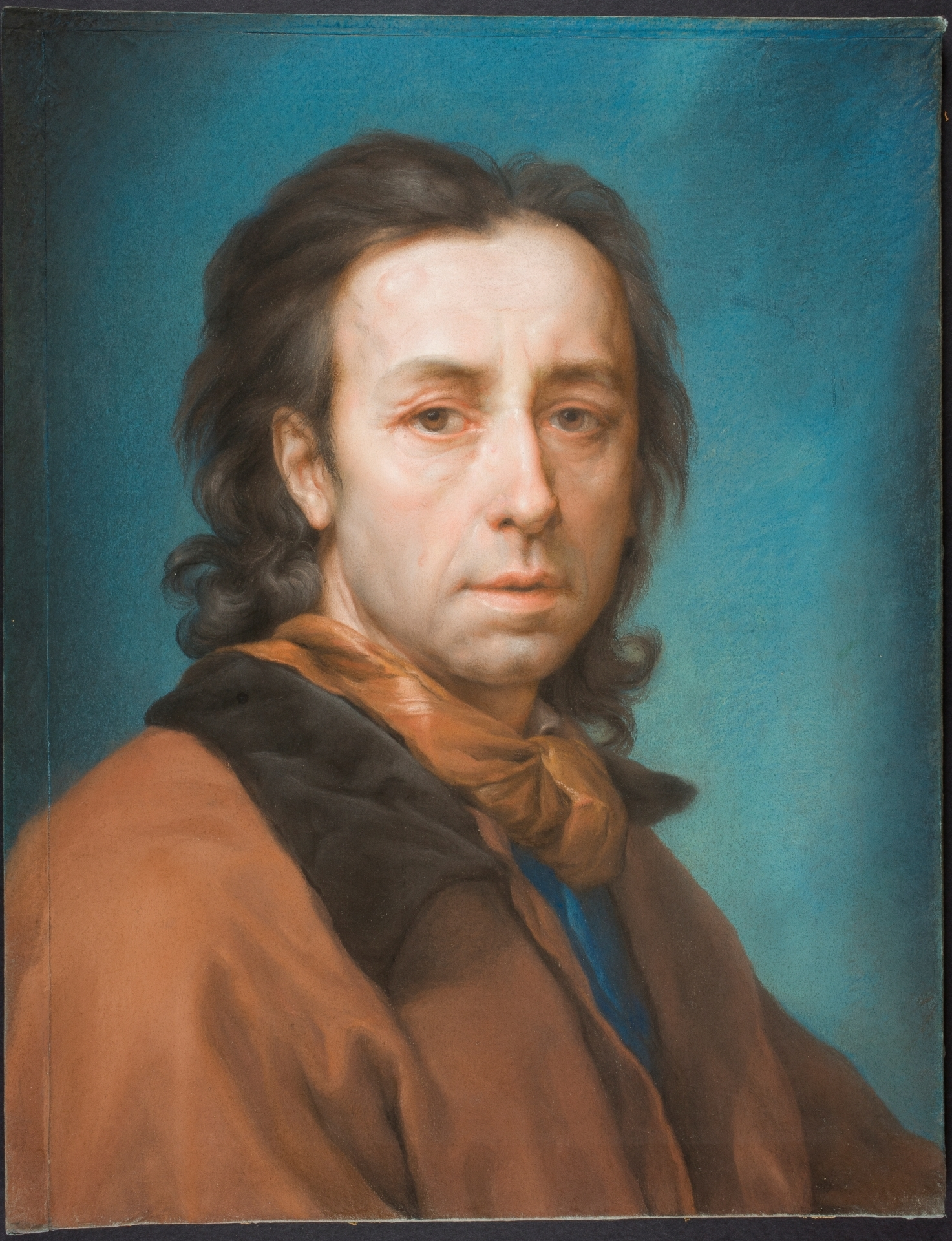
Portrait of Anton Raphael Mengs by Anna Maria Mengs, Museo del Prado

Anna Maria Mengs, or Ana Carmona (1751–1792), was a German artist; known largely for portraits.

== Biography ==
Born in Dresden, she was the daughter of the painter Raphael Mengs and his wife, Margarita Guazzi. She studied art with her father. In 1777, she married the Spanish engraver Manuel Salvador Carmona. They had seven children.

Her works include portraits in pastel and miniature; that of her husband is in the Real Academia de Bellas Artes de San Fernando, to which Mengs was admitted as a member of merit on August 29, 1790. She died in Madrid in 1792 and was interred at St Sebastian's Church.

In 1793, to mark the first anniversary of her death, the Academy of San Fernando presented an exhibition of Mengs' work. In 1800, in his Diccionario histórico de los más ilustres profesores de las Bellas Artes en España, Juan Agustín Ceán Bermúdez wrote of her that despite "seven births, and the care and education of her children, she did not stop painting miniatures and pastels with good taste and intelligence."
