= Salamanca =

- Municipality
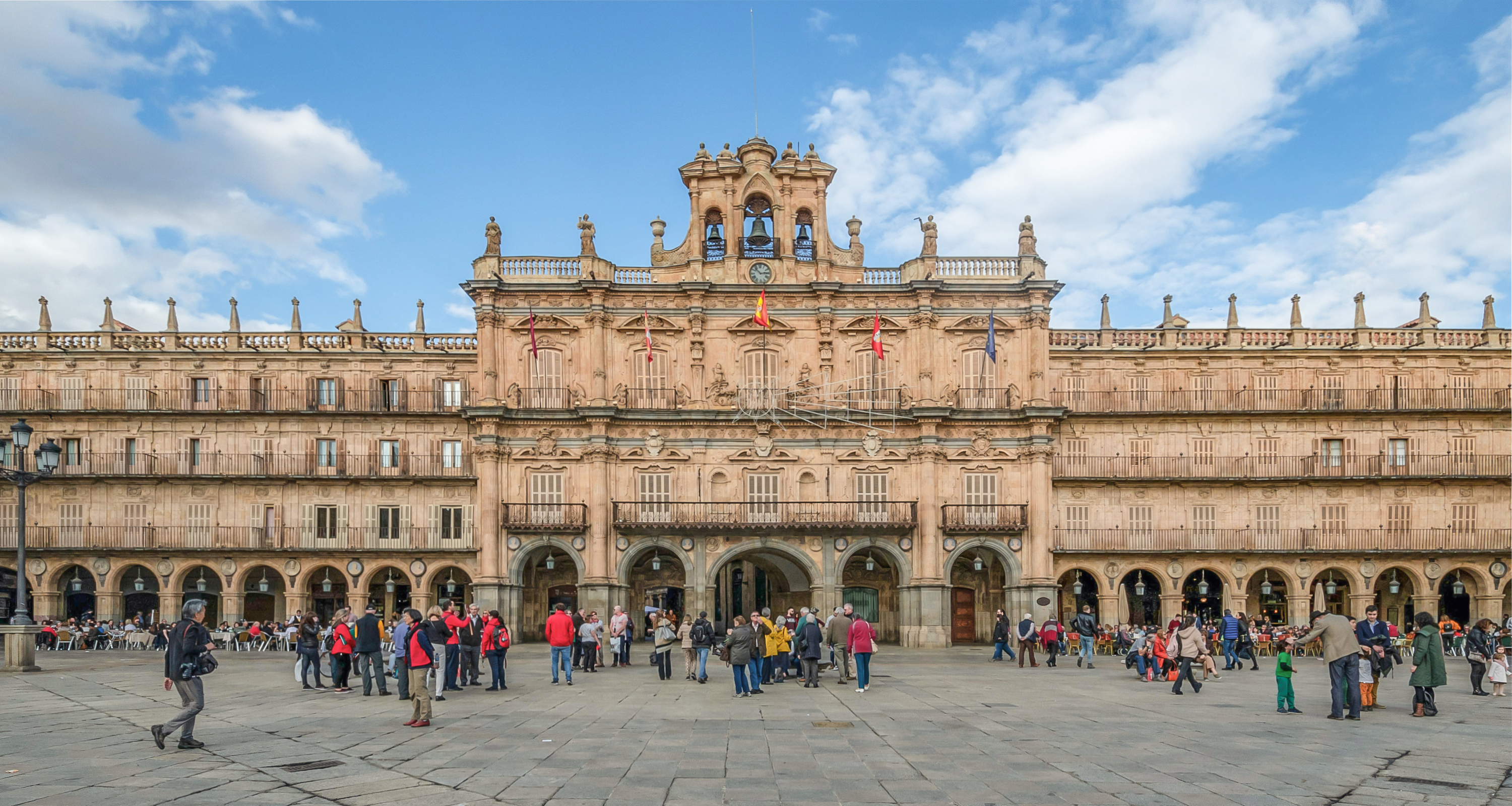
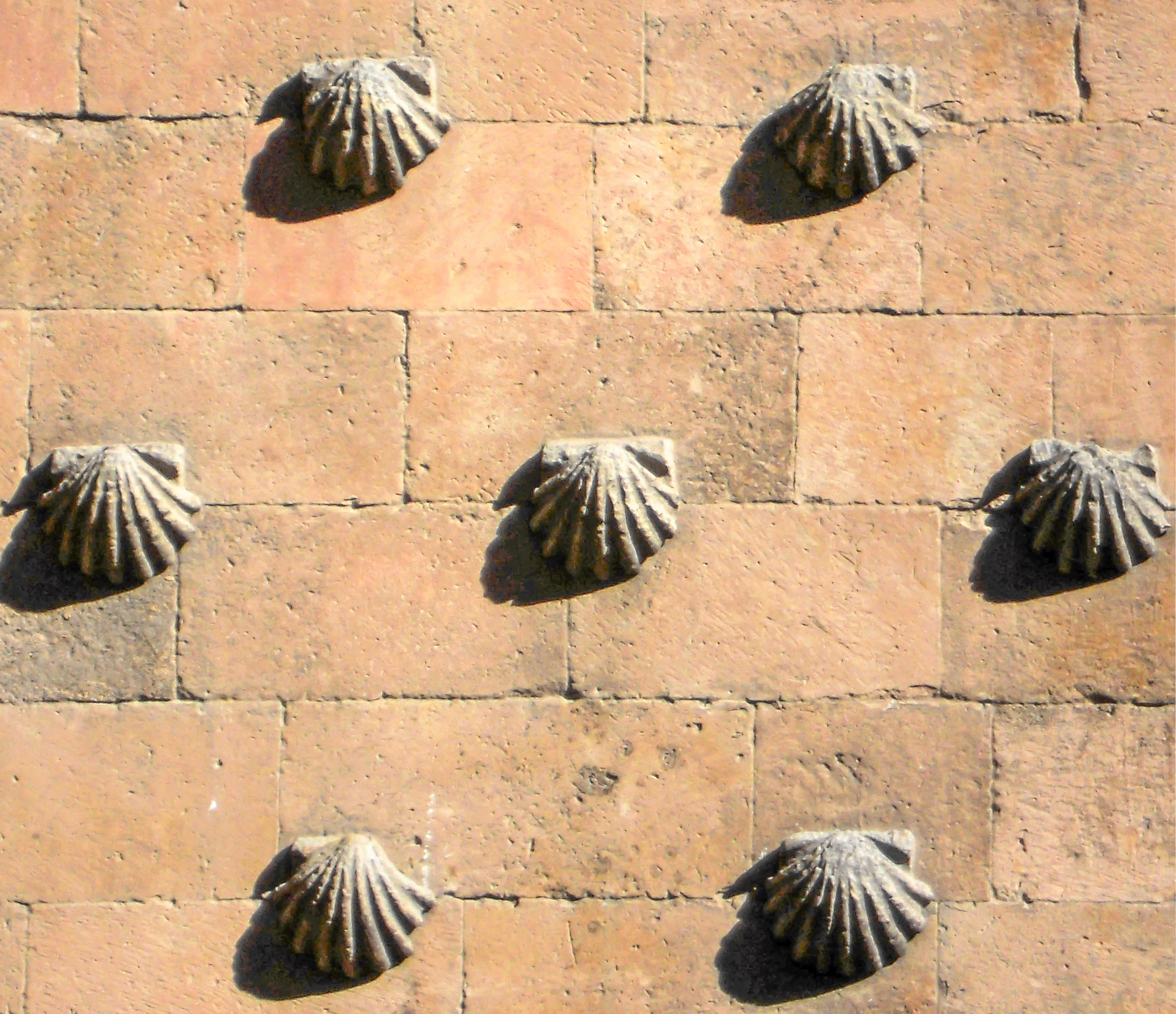
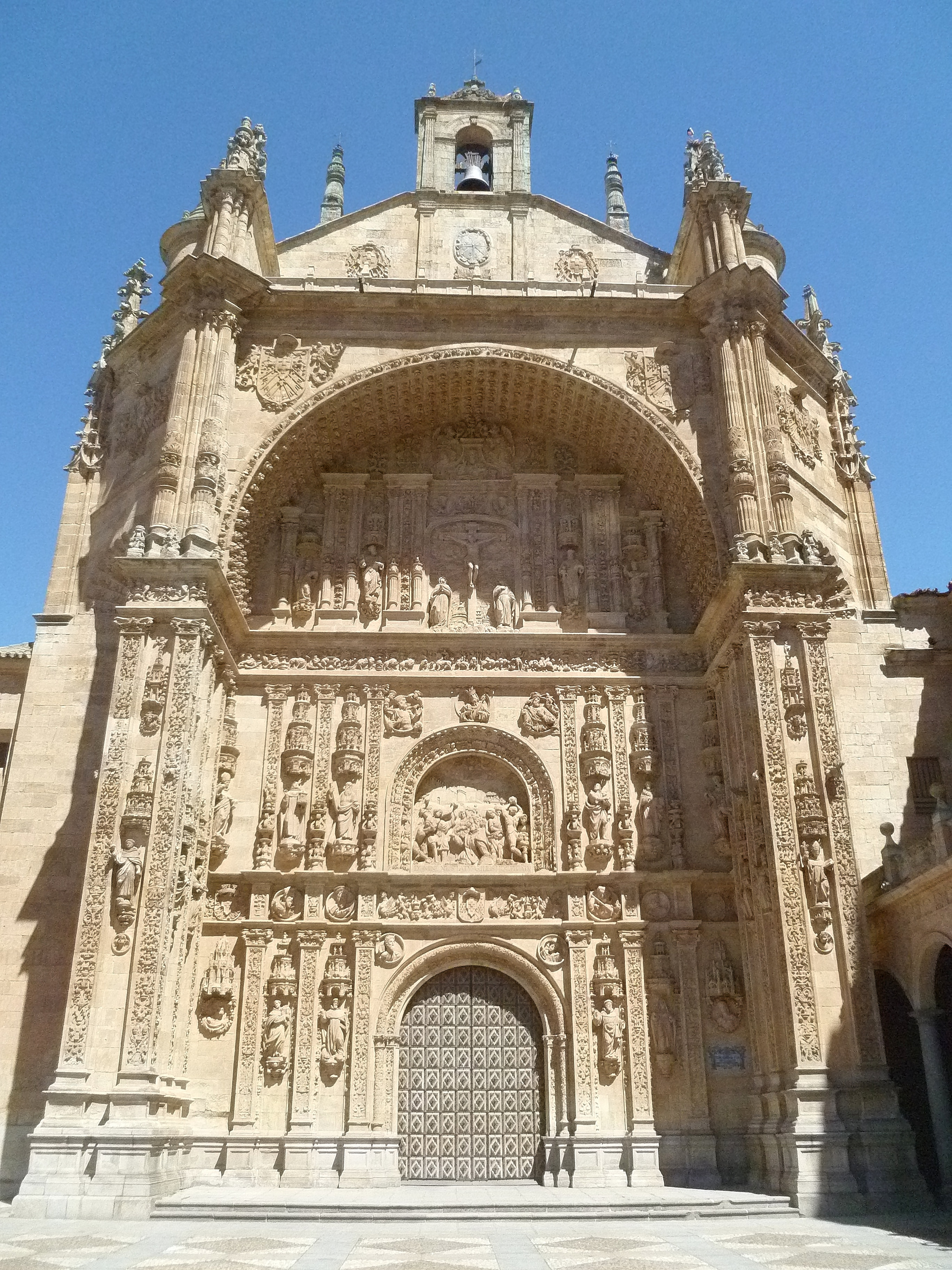
- Plaza Mayor Rúa Mayor Casa de las Conchas Convento de las Dueñas University Convento de San Esteban The Old and New Cathedral reflected on the Tormes river

- Flag Coat of arms
- Location of Salamanca
- Coordinates: 40°57′54″N 05°39′51″W
- Country: Spain
- Autonomous community: Castile and León
- Province: Salamanca

Government
  - Mayor: Carlos García Carbayo

Area
  - Total: 39.56 km^{2} (15.27 sq mi)
- Elevation: 802 m (2,631 ft)

Population (2025)
  - Total: 145,583
  - Rank: 46th in Spain
  - Density: 3,680/km^{2} (9,531/sq mi)
- Demonym(s): Salamancan, Salmantino, Salmantina, Charro, Charra
- Time zone: UTC+1 (CET)
  - Summer (DST): UTC+2 (CEST)
- Postal code: 37001-37010
- Area code: 34 (Spain) + 923 (Salamanca)
- Website: salamanca.es

UNESCO World Heritage Site
- Official name: Old City of Salamanca
- Type: Cultural
- Criteria: i, ii, iv
- Designated: 1988 (12th session)
- Reference no.: 381
- Region: Europe and North America

Salamanca (Spanish: [salaˈmaŋka]) is a municipality and city in the autonomous community of Castile and León in Spain, and the capital of the Province of Salamanca. Attached to the comarca of Campo Charro, the city lies on the northern half of the Meseta Central, in the western-central part of the Iberian Peninsula, straddling the Tormes river. Its population in 2024 was 144,458. It is the main municipality of a urban area that makes the most of the population and business activity in the province.

The Iron Age hilltop site of Cerro de San Vicente on the right bank of the Tormes is considered the first human settlement in the current city. By the 3rd century BC, urban settlement in the nearby Teso de las Catedrales had consolidated under the influence of the Vaccaei and Vettones. Following Roman subjugation, the indigenous oppidum became the Roman civitas of Salmantica. Little is known of the history of the place after the Migration Period. Christian settlement under the Kingdom of León led by Raymond of Burgundy took hold in the 11th century. The University of Salamanca, founded in 1218, gained widespread recognition in the 16th century for the intellectual production of the so-called School of Salamanca. In addition, the city has also recently developed as a centre for Spanish-language learning.

The Old City of Salamanca is a World Heritage Site, featuring notable examples of plateresque architecture. The Holy Week in Salamanca enjoys the status of Fiesta of International Tourist Interest.

== Etymology ==
The origin of the toponym Salamanca is not clear. Greeks Polybius of Megalopolis and Stephanus called the city Helmantike, a Greek name that meant "Land of divination" Ptolemy appeals to a polis dominated by the Vacceis with the name of Salmatica or Salmantica. Roman Livy and Plutarch will call it Hermandica and Polyaenus calls it Salmantida or Salmatis. Other historians even call it Selium and Sentica.

On the other hand, some others like Justin and later Rui Méndez or Murillo attributed the creation of the city to Teucer, son of Telamon, king of Salamis, who after being defeated in the Trojan War, came to the Iberian Peninsula and founded a city, which remembering his homeland he would call Salamatica. Another theory is the existence of a god of the first inhabitants — nomadic shepherds and Neolithic farmers — called Helman, whose name derived from the toponym Helmantica.

The philologist Martín S. Ruipérez contributes a new interpretation summarized in that "the first element of Salamanca, sala- is the designation of the ford of a river", "sal and hel- cannot be linguistically related one from the other" and regarding the second element -manca "where some believe to see the same element in the toponym Talamanca (de Jarama) which, in turn, would coincide in its first element with Talavera, and in Simancas, all of which is undemonstrable".

== History ==
=== Antiquity ===
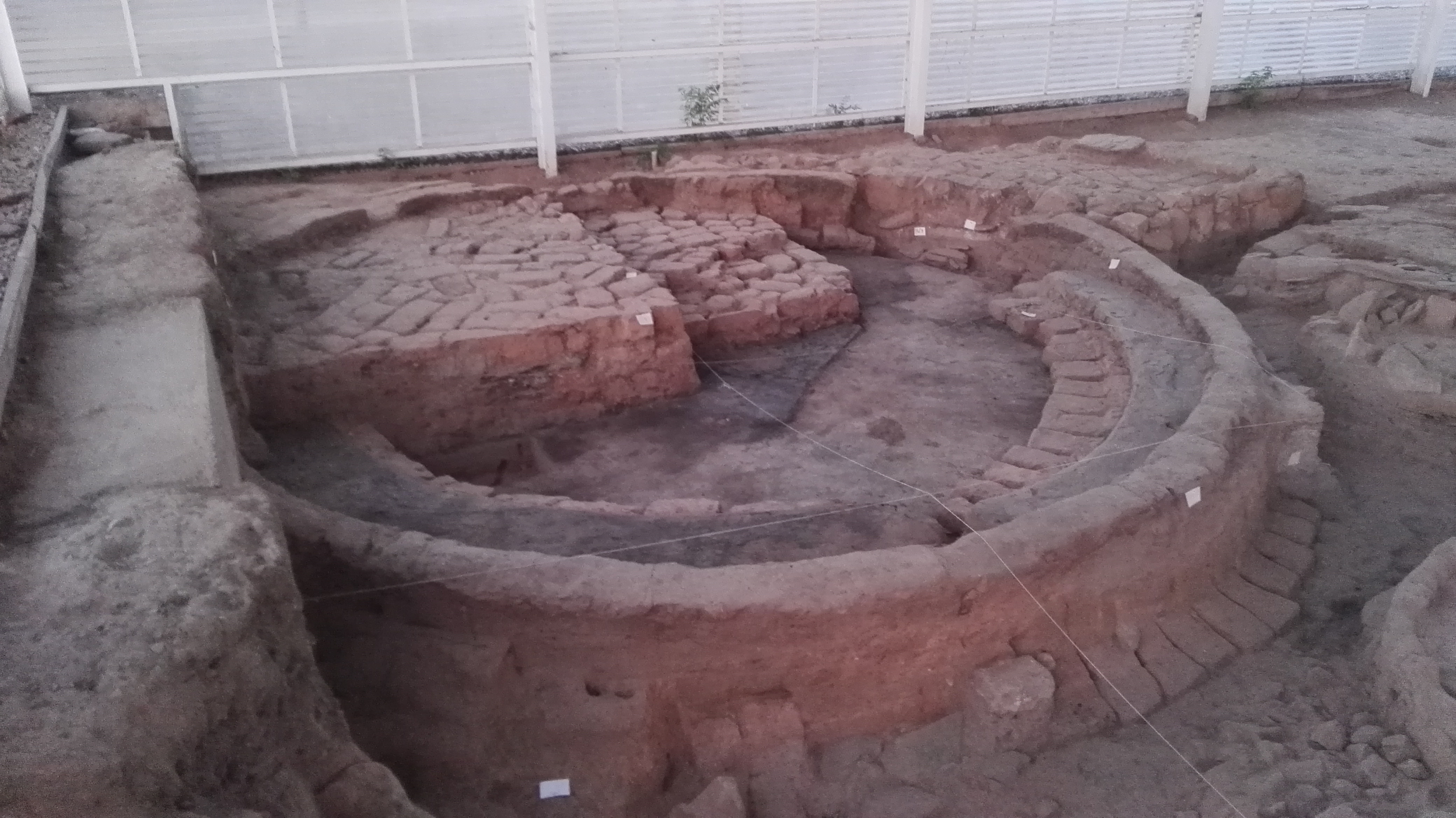
Remains of a house at the Cerro de San Vicente Archaeological Park (c. 800–400 BC), a hamlet assigned to the Early Iron Age

The first human habitat in the Salamanca area has been dated to the beginning of the first millennium BC. This is attested by the ceramic remains found in the "San Vicente hill" and which have been ascribed to the Las Cogotas I culture of the Final Bronze Age. In this same hill has been found what to date is considered the first human settlement of stable and continuous character, although already ascribed to the culture of the Soto de Medinilla of the first Iron Age (7th century BC). Later, already in the second Iron Age (from the 4th century BC), it has been found that a new population center developed in the so-called "teso de las catedrales or cerro de San Isidro", this already of Castro character and that lasted until the definitive Romanization of the city. All these settlements, and therefore the current site of Salamanca, owe their existence to the special geomorphological characteristics of the terrain on which they settled. Thus, the choice of the location of these successive settlements must have had a special influence on the fact that this area had three tesserae -formed by the erosion of the San Francisco and Santo Domingo streams-, their corresponding watercourses and especially the proximity of the Tormes River. These details point to the suitability of this territory for the primitive functions of defense and control of the surrounding territory.

The settlement of the hill of San Isidro must have been a city of great importance between the 4th and 2nd centuries BC, not only for its dimensions, but also for its optimal orographic conditions and defensive protection, since it had a wall and moat. In 220 B.C., Hannibal, in his advance through Iberia, besieged and conquered the ancient city of Helmantica (Salamanca). Thus, Plutarch says that "Hannibal besieged it and its inhabitants, to avoid further damage, submitted to him offering them three hundred talents of silver and as many hostages, raising the siege, the Helmantiqueses, failed to keep their promises and protected by their women who had hidden their weapons and managed to defeat Hannibal's troops". However, the Carthaginian general ended up seizing them and, according to Polybius, "admired by the bravery of his women, by them he returned to his men the homeland and wealth".

After the Second Punic War, the victorious Roman army began its expansion throughout most of the Iberian Peninsula. Salamanca began an intense period of Romanization as a city annexed to the province of Lusitania. The Roman Salmantica was restructured, limiting its settlement to the so-called teso de las catedrales, abandoning the site of the hill of San Vicente. Its new configuration kept it as a remarkable city, not only for its particular defensive and accessibility characteristics, but also for being a center of exchange.

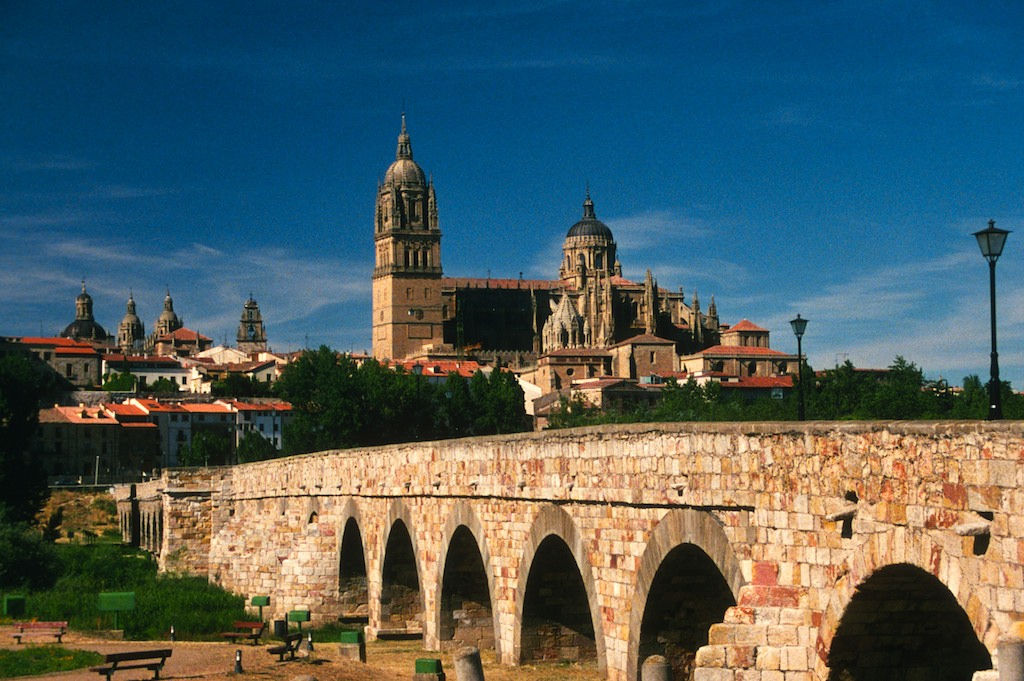
The Roman bridge of Salamanca is an infrastructure that, since the 1st century, has provided passage over the Tormes River

Three of the cultural elements that have had the greatest influence on the configuration and development of the city of Salamanca come from the Roman period. In the first place, the Calzada de la Plata, considered as its main communication infrastructure, the main axis of city planning and a milestone in the development of its commercial function. Secondly, the Roman bridge, as an infrastructure that since the 1st century guaranteed the passage over the Tormes river and therefore the access to the city from the south. The Roman bridge still remains today in the northern half, since the other half had to be rebuilt in the 17th century after the San Policarpo flood. Finally, the so-called Cerca Vieja, primitive wall of the city that surrounded the perimeter of the hill of San Isidro or of the cathedrals on the layout of the previous Castro.

In November 2015, in the course of an emergency excavation carried out in the subsoil of a house located in calle Libreros, several fragments of a male marble statue of a togado character were found, which must have been originally located somewhere in the Roman forum of the city of Salmantica, although it must have been later reused as filler material in the place where it was discovered. The statue is exhibited in the Museum of Salamanca and is the first, and to date, the only sculptural find from the Roman period that has appeared in the subsoil of the city. Some specialists consider that this finding, put in relation with several Roman inscriptions from the beginning of the Empire found in the ancient Salmantica, allows to defend the hypothetical juridical promotion of the ancient indigenous oppidum to Roman civitas during the reign of Augustus.

=== Middle Ages ===
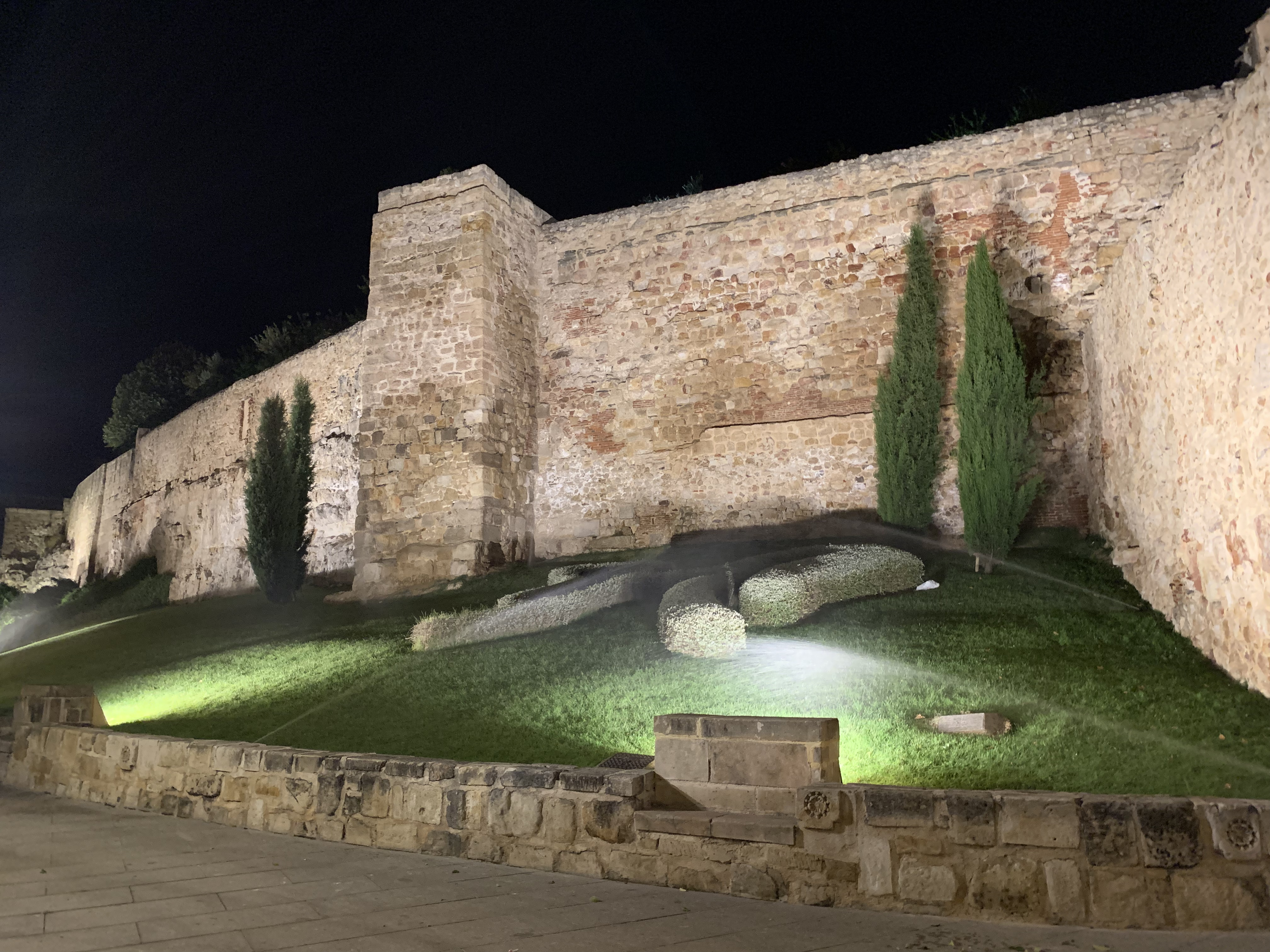
Walls of Salamanca

With the end of the Western Roman Empire, the Alans settled in Lusitania and the city became part of this region. Later the Visigoths conquered the city and annexed it to their territory. There is little information about the development of Salamanca in the Visigothic period, it is only known that in the 4th century the Roman walls were extended with keeps on the same layout, and that the remains of the previous walls were destroyed practically in their entirety. It is known that in 589 the city was an episcopal seat because it was among the cities that sent bishops to the councils of Toledo.

In 712, with the Muslim invasion of the Iberian Peninsula, Musa ibn Nusayr conquered the city. During the Early Middle Ages, the area remained a "no man's land" and most of its population centers were destroyed by the frequent incursions (algaradas) of the Arabs. Salamanca was reduced to an unimportant and almost uninhabited nucleus, although the bridge remained intact, with some settlers in the surrounding area. The successive attempts of the Christian kingdoms to stabilize the area caused many clashes with Muslim expeditions to the north, which caused several skirmishes and battles, such as that of Alfonso I of Asturias in 754, which ended up destroying what was left of the town.

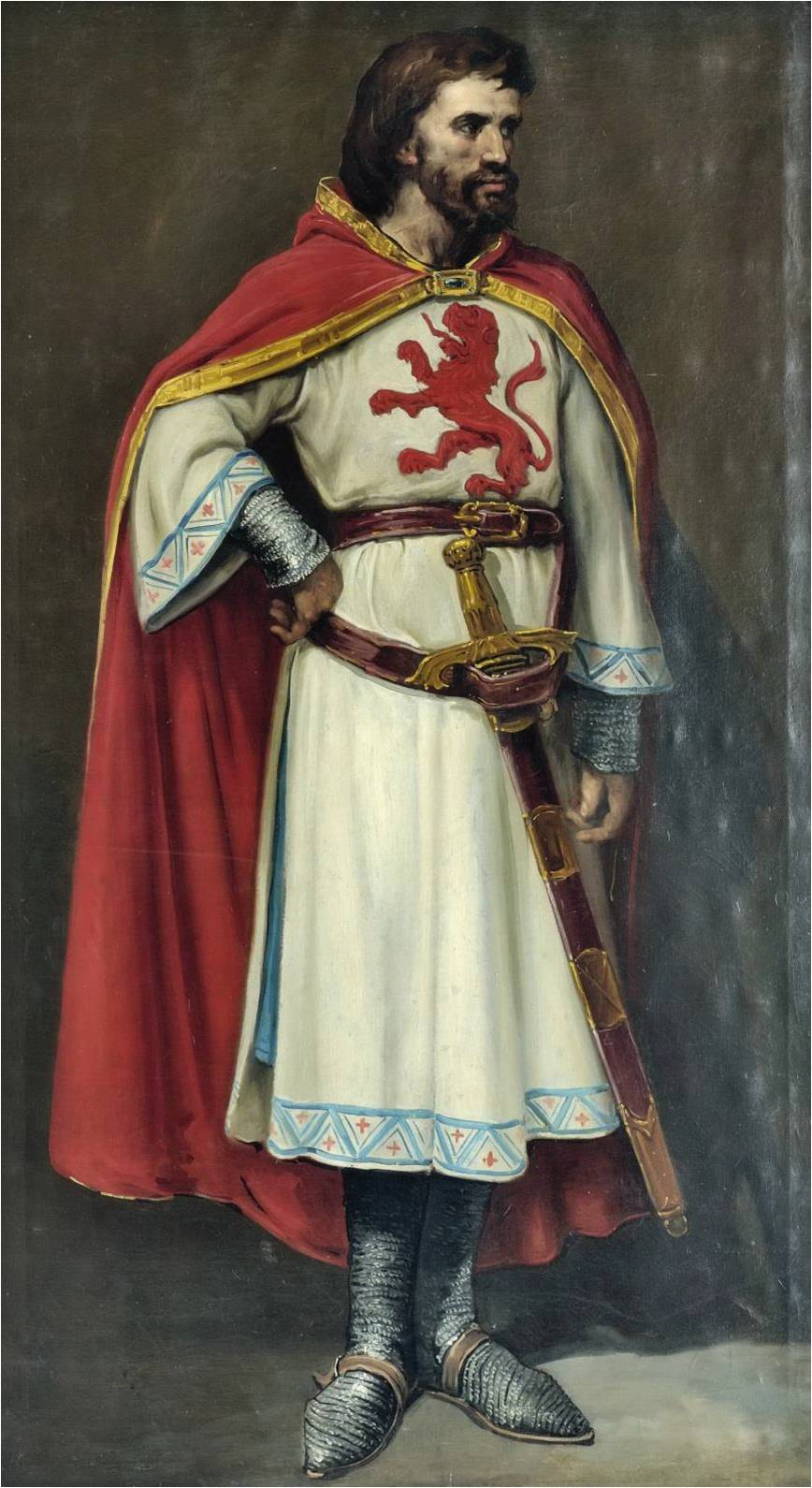
Ramiro II of León undertook a first repopulation in the 10th century.

The area remained more or less depopulated until after the important Christian victory, in the Battle of Simancas of 939, the effective repopulation of the riverside area of the Tormes began. According to the Pelagian wording of the Chronicle of Sampiro, two months after the end of the Islamic attack, Ramiro II of León ordered the advance of his army towards the banks of the Tormes, where he says that the repopulation began:

Civitates desertas ibidem populavit; hae sunt: Salamantica, sedes antiqua castrorum, Letesma, Ribas, Balneos, Alphandiga, Penna et alia plurima castella, quod longum est prenotare.
He repopulated deserted cities in the same place; these are: Salamantica, the ancient seat of the castrum, Letesma, Ribas, Balneos, Alphandiga, Penna, and many other fortified places, of which the list is long.

— Sampiro, Chronicle of Sampiro, 11th century.

Everything seems to indicate that to the pre-existing population was added during this phase the emigration that came fundamentally from comarcas located to the north of the Duero; in the case of Salamanca it is undoubtedly that it is preferably emigrants arriving from the vicinity of León, according to the donation made by Ordoño III of León in the year 953 to the church of León of all the churches recently constructed in the alfoz of Salamanca.

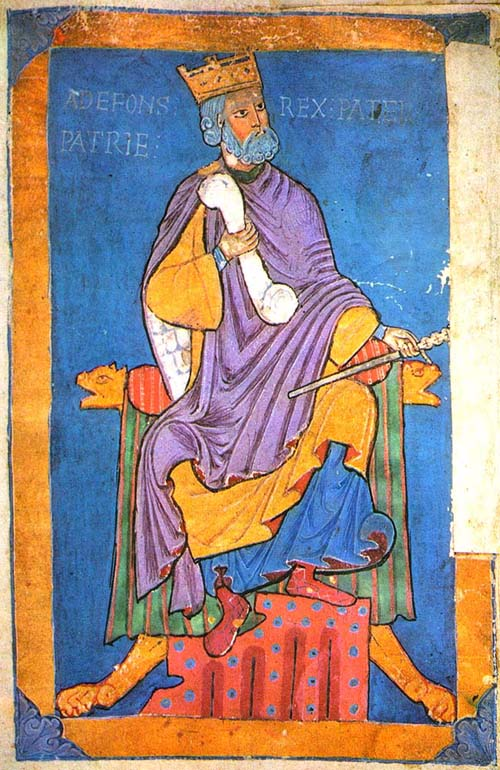
King Alfonso VI of León definitively repopulated the city in 1085, entrusting the direction of this repopulation process to his son-in-law Raymond of Burgundy

After the conquest of Toledo by Alfonso VI of León in 1085, the definitive repopulation of the city took place. In 1102, Raymond of Burgundy went to the city with a large group of settlers of diverse origins, with a composition similar to the new inhabitants of the city of Ávila -Franks, Castilians, serranos, Mozarabs, Toroans, Portugueses and Bragançans, as well as with the occasional collaboration of Galicians, Jews and Muslims; which are collected in the Fuero de Salamanca, by order of his father-in-law Alfonso VI. These founded their respective churches and parishes. Of all the repopulating groups the most important was that of the Serranos (mountainous-Castilian people), also called the warrior-shepherds, dedicated exclusively to the care of their livestock and warfare. It should not be forgotten that all of medieval Extremadura, territory between the Duero and the Central System, was known in the Arab chronicles as "Country of the Serranos". Even today there is still a street "calle Serranos" around which this repopulating group was agglutinated.

The new settlers occupied the old walled enclosure and colonized new lands in the surrounding area. The occupation of the city responded to social, ethnic and power criteria. Thus, the social elite was located in the center of the city, a space that coincided with that of the ancient Celtiberian city. The Serranos, linked to political and military power, occupied the western part (house of the royal representative and Alcázar) and the Franks to the east, together with the Episcopal see and the commercial center around the Azogue Viejo. The Jews will be located next to the Alcázar and the remaining groups of repopulators (Castilians, Portuguese, Jews, Mozarabs, Toroans and Galicians, among others) will be located in the spaces outside the walls.

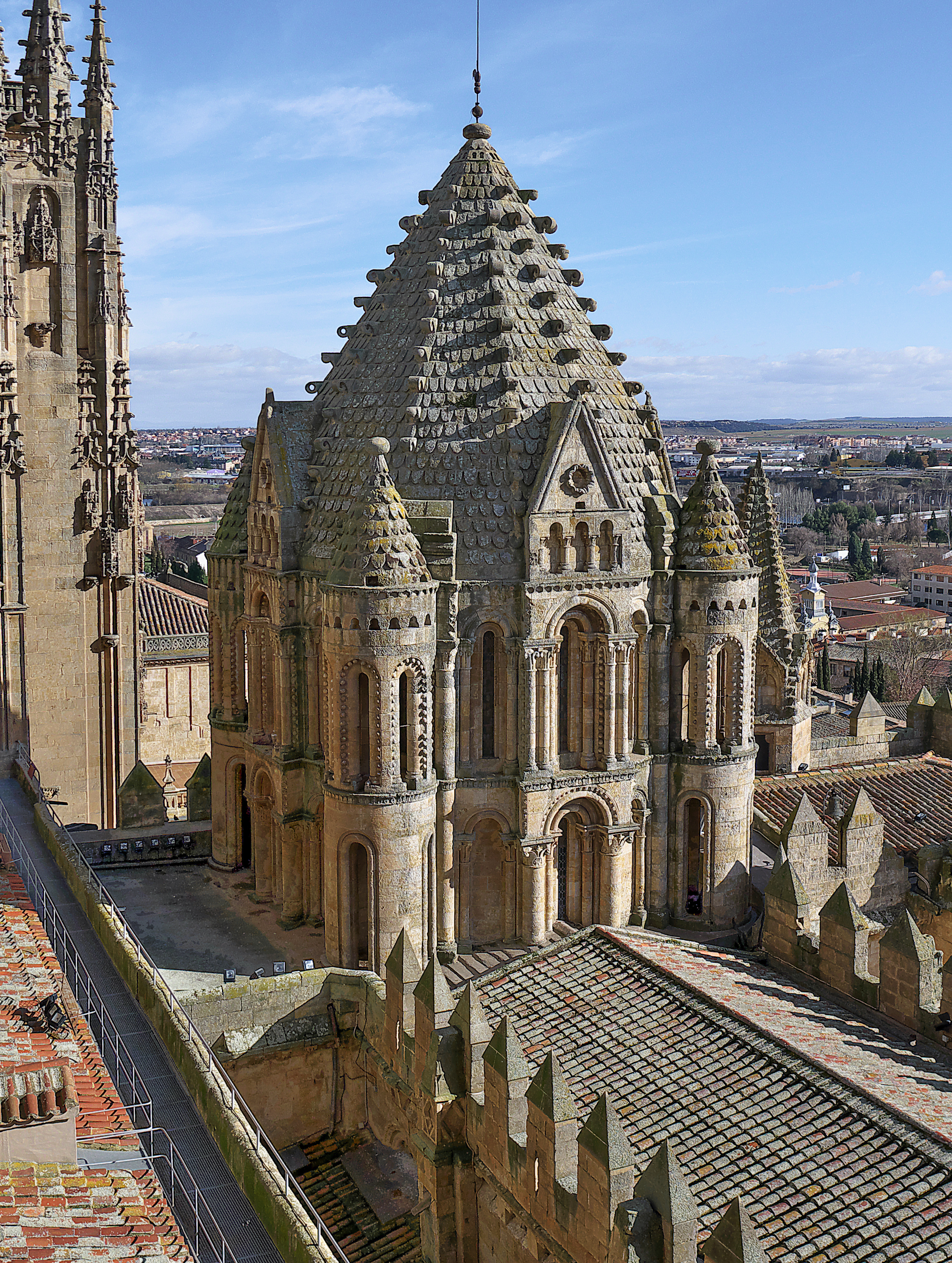
The Old cathedral of Salamanca, built between 1120 and 1236, on the initiative of its first bishop Jerome of Périgord.

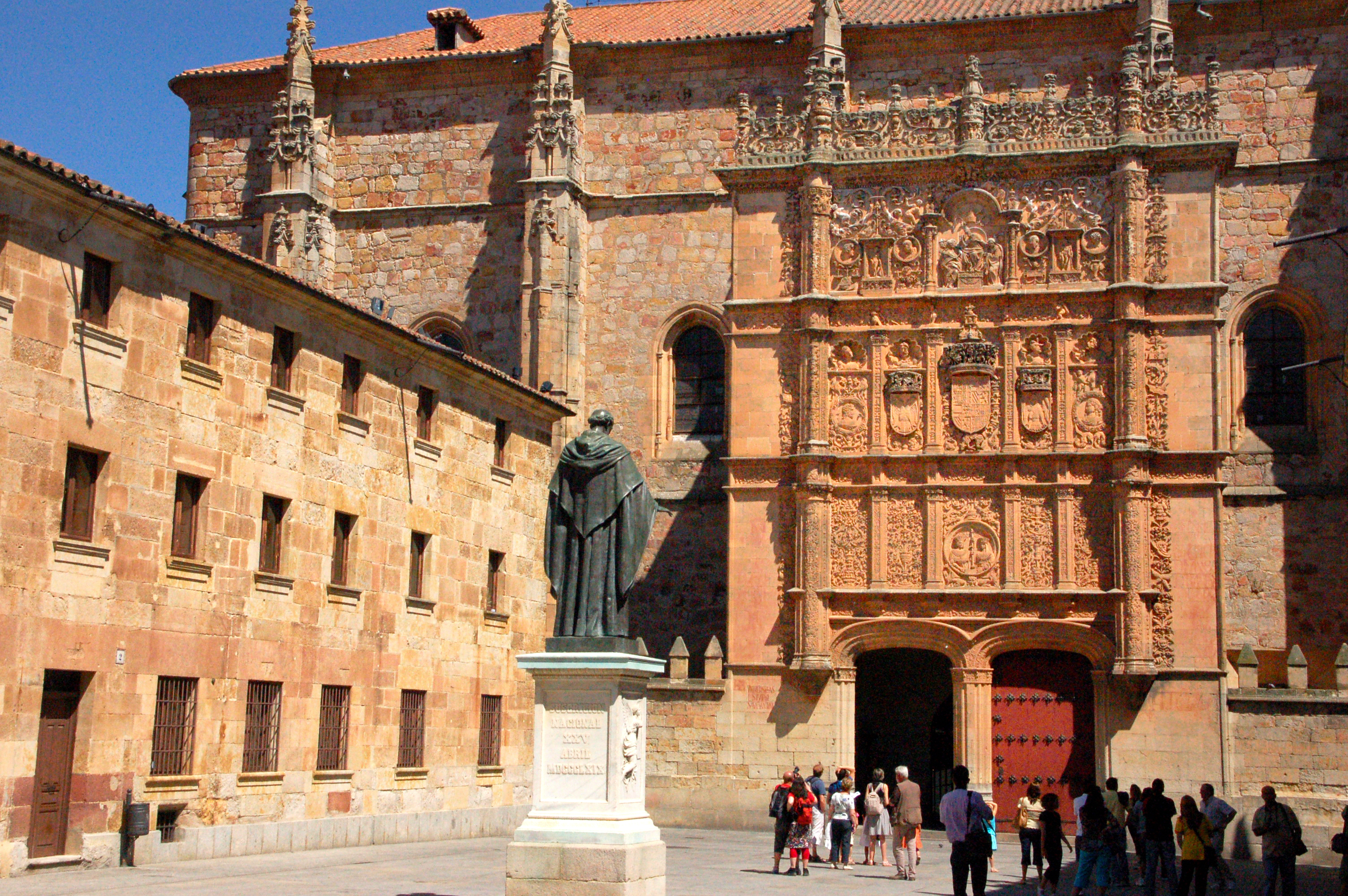
Current buildings of the University of Salamanca, built between 1401 and 1611. Until the 15th century, classes were held in the cloister of the Old Cathedral, in houses rented from the chapter and in the church of San Benito.

The Diocese of Salamanca was restored (the first bishop being Jerome of Périgord) and the construction of the Old Cathedral was begun, at whose side some schools were founded, which would be the seed of the future university.

In 1218, the monarch Alfonso IX of León granted privileges that attracted new settlers -among them a large Jewish community-, the city expanded its walled perimeter and granted the cathedral schools the rank of studium generale which, in 1254, would become University of Salamanca by royal decree of Alfonso X of Castile, later ratified by Pope Alexander IV, in 1255:

To the University of Salamanca's teachers and schoolchildren:
We consider it worthy and convenient that those who daily cultivate with lessons the field of study so that they may receive the daisy of science find us favorable and benign in their petitions so that their study may be exercised all the more freely the more they feel protected by apostolic favor.
And consequently, in accordance with your request, informed that it sometimes happens that those who have been examined in the Salamancan study and are declared suitable are not allowed to dictate elsewhere if they do not undergo another examination, attending to the request of the illustrious king of Castile and León and yours, we declare that, after some teacher or scholar of Salamanca has taken the relevant examination in some faculty and was declared suitable, he may practice in any other study, without new examination, except in Paris and Bologna.

— Letter of Pope Alexander IV to the University of Salamanca. 1255.
I. Rodríguez de Lama, The pontifical documentation of Pope Alexander IV. 1976.

The university would eventually achieve great prestige.

On August 12, 1311, the only king of Castile and León that the city has ever produced, Alfonso XI "the Avenger", was born within Salamanca's walls. He acceded to the throne at the age of fourteen and conquered Gibraltar in command of the militias of the Crown, in which the large presence of Salamancan contingents stood out.

During the 15th century, Salamanca was the scene of great rivalries that affected all areas of urban life, triggering the so-called War of the Bandos, which pitted two factions led by families of the nobility - the Benitinos and the Tomesinos, so called because they were grouped around the parishes of San Benito and Santo Tomé- that disputed the control of the city and that years later concluded with the signing of a Concord achieved by a brave Augustinian friar who, in time, became the patron saint of the city: Saint John of Sahagún.

The 15th century was plagued by social conflict and tensions among the urban elites (a complex development, often oversimplified as an infighting between bandos), with occasional outbursts of grave episodes of violence, conveying a chronic feeling of insecurity.

The late 15th century population has been tentatively estimated at 15,000–25,000. By the turn of the 16th century most of the population dwelled at the right (north) bank of the Tormes, with a small arrabal in the south bank inhabited by roughly 300 people.

With the rise of the Mesta, Salamanca gained importance as a center of manufacturings draperies and as an exporter of wool.

=== Early modern Age ===
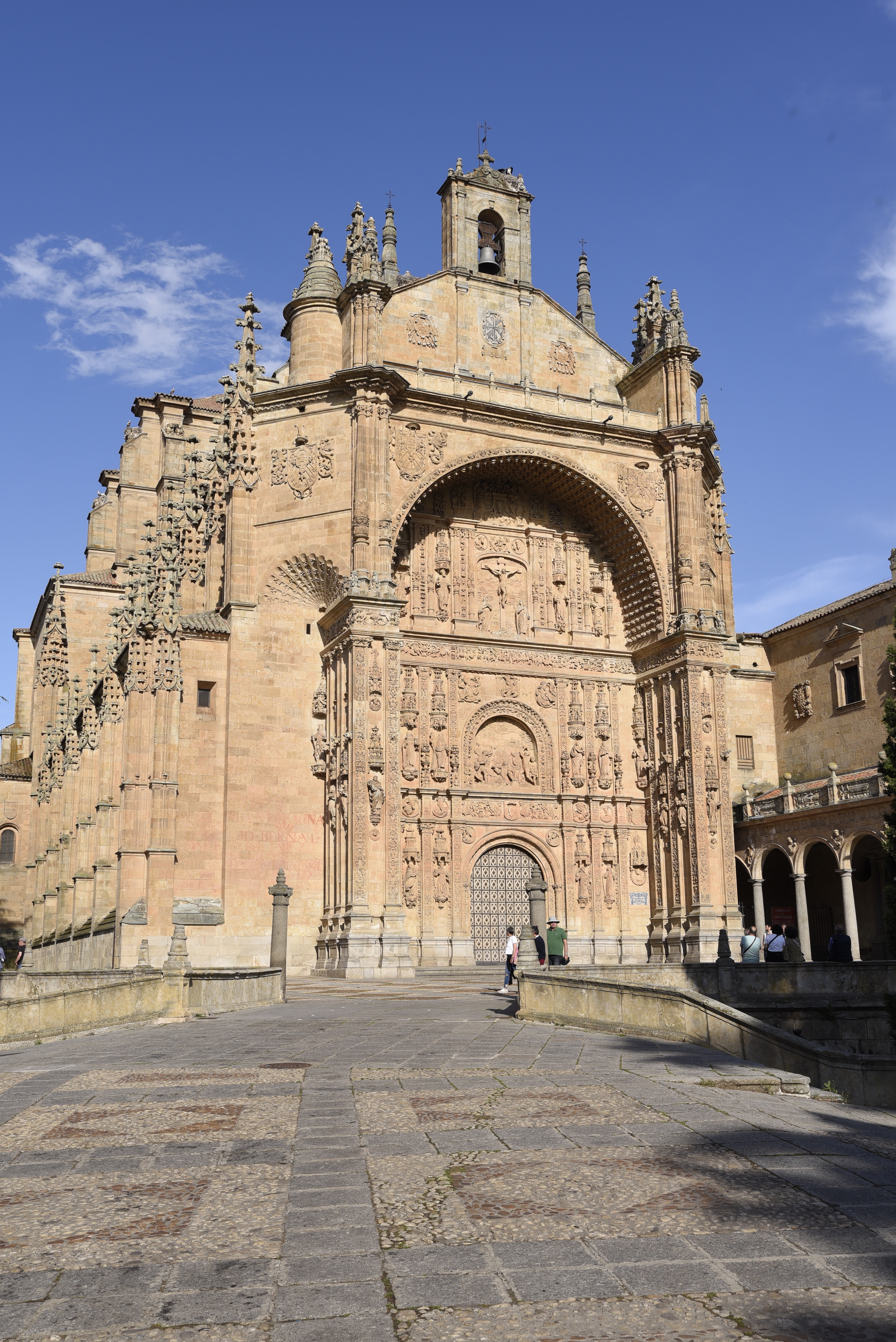
Plateresque Convento de San Esteban, built between 1524-1610.

Like the rest of the historical nuclei of the Crown that had representation in Cortes, Salamanca joined the movement of the Communities of Castile (1520) against the new taxes demanded by Charles V, Holy Roman Emperor in the Cortes of Castile and in defense of its textile manufactures against the privileges of the wool exporters. After the defeat of the Comuneros, King Carlos V had the upper part of the towers of the palaces of the Salamancans who joined the revolt removed.

The 16th century was the period of greatest splendor of the city, both in demography and in university life, thanks to the prestige of its professors, with the so-called School of Salamanca. Then it joined the general decline of the cities of the Crown of Castile in the Meseta Norte (12,000 inhabitants in 1651). Moreover, it was around that time that the Church of San Isidoro was built.

The juridical doctrine of the School of Salamanca represented a change in trajectory from medieval law, which relied extensively on the tradition of casuistry and on Roman law, to a system that focused more on scholasticism and Thomism, and which tried to be more explicitly universal. Since Spain had just started colonizing the Americas, the School of Salamanca was interested in the rights on non-Europeans, including rights as a corporeal being (right to life), economic rights (right to own property) and spiritual rights (rights to freedom of thought and rights related to intrinsic human dignity). Due to the institutional connections of Dominicans at the University of Salamanca (especially Francisco de Vitoria) and Dominican missionaries in the colonies (such as Antonio de Montesinos and Bartolomé de las Casas), the School of Salamanca was critical of the Spanish colonists and the laws that permitted their abusive treatment of native peoples. Their work on the idea of ius gentium, or "rights of peoples/nations", was a crucial contribution to the modern development of human rights and international law.

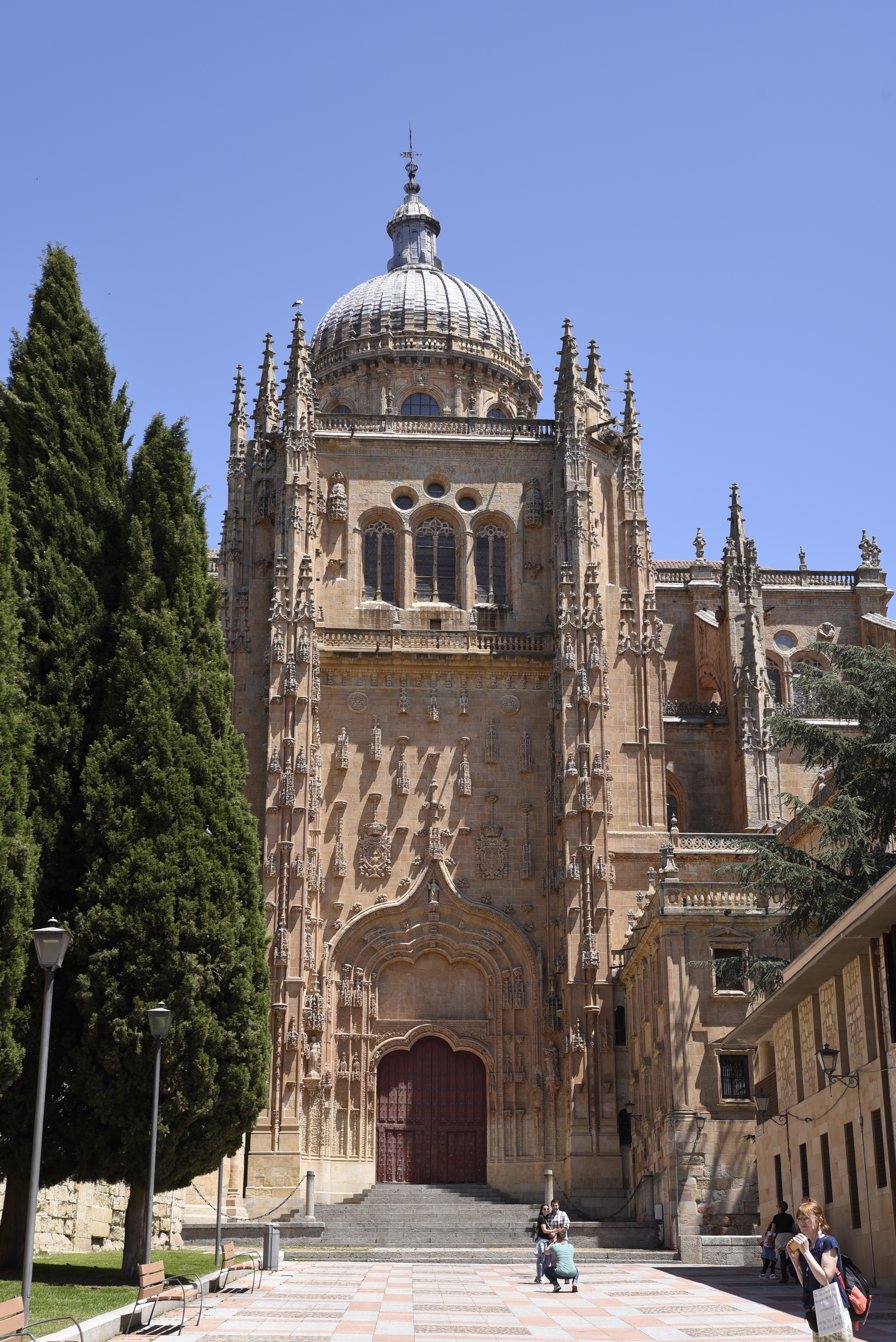
Plateresque South facade of the New Cathedral of Salamanca, church built between 1513 and 1733.

During the 16th century, the city reached its height of splendour (it is estimated that Salamanca had about 24,000 inhabitants and around 1580 6500 students were enrolled each year). During that period, the University of Salamanca hosted the most important intellectuals of the time; these groups of mostly-Dominican scholars were designated the School of Salamanca.

In 1551, the Holy Roman Emperor Charles V, Holy Roman Emperor ordered an inquiry to find out if the science of Andreas Vesalius, physician and anatomist, was in line with Catholic doctrine. Vesalius came to Salamanca that same year to appear before the board and was acquitted.

The Jewish quarter of Salamanca was located to the north, next to the walls (more or less the current avenida de Mirat). When, in 1492, they were expelled, the neighborhood was walled up and respected by the Salamancans, probably thinking of a possible return, and when it became uninhabited it was filled with rabbits, so it has been known until recently as barrio del Conejal.

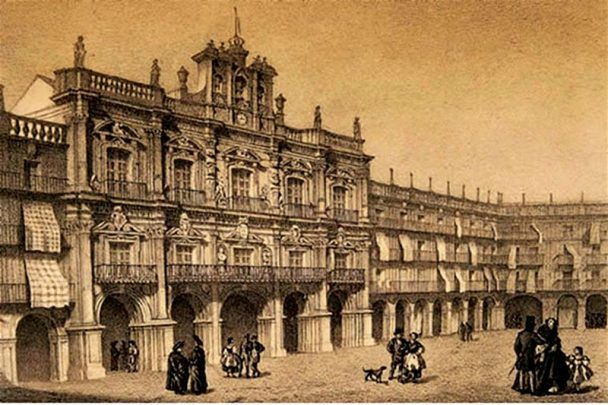
Plaza Mayor de Salamanca, painting of the 18th century.

In the 18th century it had an important economic and cultural revival, which led to the completion of the New Cathedral of Salamanca (whose works had been stopped for almost a century) and the construction of its imposing baroque Plaza Mayor in 1729. When the great Lisbon earthquake of 1755 struck, many of the city's monumental buildings saw the integrity of their fabrics endangered. One of the most revealing images of its effects can still be seen in the Church of San Martín: many of the stones must have been in the air for a fraction of a second, enough for the pillars to tilt and the voussoirs of arches and vaults to fall in a place that was not exactly the one they had occupied until that moment, so that in its interior today one can see arched walls and pillars, deformed arches and ribs. However, the city's economic prosperity made it possible to renovate many of the monumental buildings damaged by the earthquake, including the cathedral, which was the most affected of all the Spanish cathedrals. In the cultural aspect, the influence of the Bourbon Enlightenment was also noted in the university in the last third of the century.

=== Modern era ===
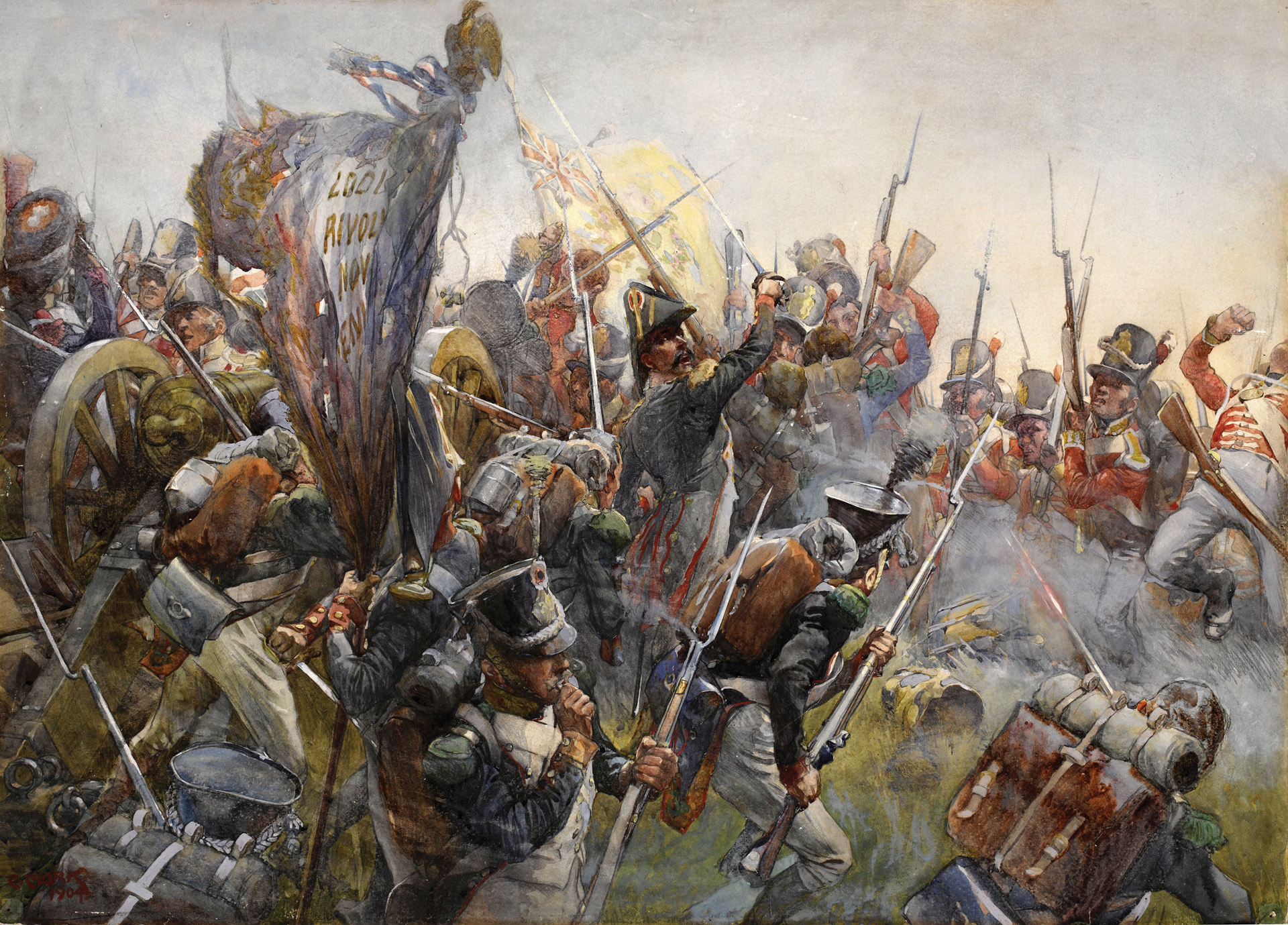
Illustration of the Battle of Salamanca

During the Peninsular War, Salamanca was occupied by the troops of Marshal Soult in 1809 and remained in French hands until the Battle of Arapiles (1812), in which an Anglo-Portuguese Army led by Wellington decisively defeated the French army of Marmont. During the occupation, the French built defenses and, in order to obtain materials, destroyed an important part of the Salamancan buildings, especially in the neighborhood called Caídos (demolished), where the well-known colegios mayores of the university were erected, of which no trace remains. The western quarter of Salamanca was seriously damaged by cannon fire. The battle which raged that day is famous as a defining moment in military history and thirteen thousand men were killed or wounded in the space of only a few short hours. A bad moment came when Fernando VII of Spain closed the Spanish universities. After the reopening, the University of Salamanca was reduced to a provincial university. For the province of Salamanca acted the Salamanca guerrilla and military Julián Sánchez García "El Charro" in command of the Lancers of Castile unit.

In 1833 the province of Salamanca was created, framed in the Region of León, thus making the city of Salamanca the capital of that province, becoming home to the Diputación de Salamanca.

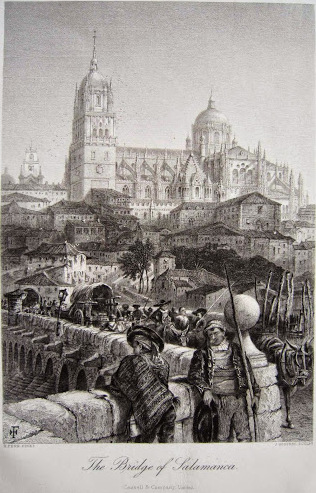
Citizens at the entrance of Salamanca in 1878 by Harry Fenn.

In 1873, after the proclamation of the First Spanish Republic, the first serious attempt to federalize Spain was undertaken through the draft Constitution of 1873. Barely five days after the presentation of this project, Salamanca suffered a Cantonalista uprising which, after four days of success, was put down on July 26, 1873. Subsequently, a military pronouncement took away the First Republic and the regionalizing initiative of the Federal State. During the rest of the 19th century the city experienced a slight recovery when it was named provincial capital and the railroad linking France with Portugal, which passed through the Meseta (Medina del Campo and Salamanca, 1877), was built.

During the devastating Spanish Civil War (1936–1939) the city quickly went over to the Nationalist side and was temporarily used as the de facto headquarters for the rebel faction. Francisco Franco was proclaimed Generalissimo on 21 September 1936 while at the city. In April 1937, the FET y de las JONS, the single party of the ensuing dictatorship, was created via a Unification Decree issued at the city upon the merging of the fascist Falange and the traditionalist carlists. The Nationalists soon moved most of the administrative premises to Burgos, which, being more central, was better suited for this purpose. However, some administrative apparatus, the Episcopal Palace, next to the Old Cathedral was the residence and command center of General Francisco Franco, and the military commands stayed in Salamanca, along with the German and Italian fascist delegations, making it the de facto Nationalist capital and centre of power during the entire civil war. Like much of fervently Catholic and largely rural León and Old Castile regions, Salamanca was a staunch supporter of the Nationalist side and Francisco Franco's regime for its long duration.

After the war, the documents seized by the rebel army as they occupied the territory that had defended the Republic were concentrated in Salamanca, creating a large documentary archive on the Spanish Civil War (General Archive of the Spanish Civil War). The part of this archive, which deals with Catalonia, as well as many valuable papers and documents of individuals and institutions not belonging to that region, was transferred to Barcelona in the spring of 2006, after great disputes between the Salamanca City Council and the Spanish government, and popular demonstrations. The Salamanca City Council, presided by Julián Lanzarote (PP), changed the name of the street where the archive is located from "Gibraltar" (a name that paid homage to the Salamanca militias that went with Alfonso XI of Castile to the conquest of Gibraltar) to "El Expolio", as a sign of protest after the transfer of the "Salamanca Papers" to Catalonia.

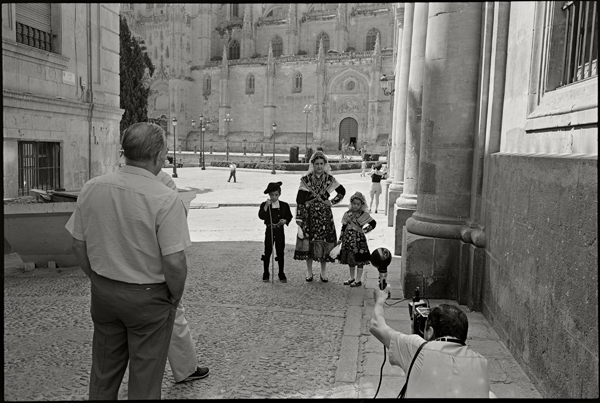
Salamancan family posing at the entrance of the new cathedral in 1984.

In 1940, Pope Pius XII founded the Pontifical University of Salamanca as a continuation of the ancient theological studies. In 1988 Salamanca was declared a World Heritage City by UNESCO. In 1998, by agreement of the ministers of culture of the European Union, Salamanca was designated (shared with Bruges), European Capital of Culture for the year 2002. The city also aspires to obtain the candidacy for the Universal Exposition of Salamanca in the not too distant future.

Currently the population of the capital of Salamanca, stagnant for about three decades, is around 160,000 inhabitants, although in 2006 it decreased by more than 11,000 people with respect to the year 1994. This is mainly due to the transfer of part of its population to the metropolitan area, and a very low birth rates that occurred from the 1980s onwards (See Demographics of Spain) leading to an aging population, a phenomenon common to many other Spanish cities, although there is also a high rate of emigration to places like Madrid. It is significant to note that the province of Salamanca has a high rate of aging population with respect to national data. From June 7–10, 1994, the World Conference on Special Needs Education took place in the capital of Salamanca, with 92 governments and 25 international organizations represented, and concluded with the "Salamanca Declaration of Principles, Policy and Practice for Special Needs Education".

For its part, the service sector (the buoyant cultural tourism and the University) is the main source of income for the city. Particularly relevant is the educational activity during the summer, as it has a large influx of students from many countries, who mostly come to learn the Spanish language and attend various summer courses. On October 14 and 15, 2005, the capital of Salamanca hosted the XV Ibero-American Summit of heads of state and government. The crown prince of Japan Naruhito visited the city on June 13, 2013 on the occasion of the commemoration of the 400th anniversary of the Spanish-Japanese exchange. He received from the hands of Mayor Alfonso Fernández Mañueco the keys to the city.

== Geography ==
Integrated in the comarca of Campo Charro, the capital of Salamanca is located 64 kilometers from Zamora, 109 kilometers from Ávila, 121 kilometers from Valladolid, 123 kilometers from Portugal and 202 kilometers from Cáceres.

The relief of the municipality is characterized by the confluence of two geological and environmental units of the southwest of the Castilian-Leonese plateau on the banks of the Tormes river. On the one hand, to the north and east, the Tertiary sedimentary basin, characterized by extensive plains dedicated to dry farming; on the other, the peneplain of the Paleozoic socket to the south and west, where an ecosystem of oak groves and pastures known as Campo Charro predominates, mostly dedicated to livestock.

The city is located at an altitude of 800 meters above sea level. The altitude of the municipality varies from 911 meters (Los Montalvos), in the southwest, and 763 meters in the last stretch in the municipality of the Tormes river.

=== Hydrography ===
The municipality of Salamanca is crossed by two surface watercourses: the Tormes river and the Zurguén stream, the latter a tributary of the river on its left bank. The valleys of the two watercourses are characterized by alluvial type materials, considered as permeable. The water table is very high, which sometimes gives rise to waterlogged areas.

The Tormes river articulates the entire provincial territory and has had a decisive influence on the historical development of the city. Its middle course is regulated by the Santa Teresa Reservoir which also fulfills the function of supplying drinking water and irrigation. Its regulation was also intended to prevent its numerous floods, such as the historic ones that occurred in 1256 and 1626, although it did not succeed, in that they have been reiterated subsequently and significantly. Likewise, the Tormes also serves as a channel for the evacuation of treated wastewater from the capital.

=== Climate ===
According to the data in the table below and the criteria of the modified Köppen climate classification Salamanca has a cold semi-arid type BSk ("cold steppe") the transition boundary to Mediterranean climates of type Csa and Csb. It is characterized by cool winters, with frequent frosts and summers are warm to hot, although the nights are cool. Precipitation is well distributed throughout the year, with summer being drier than other seasons, with Mediterranean influences.

Climate data for Salamanca Airport 790 m (2,590 ft) 1991–2020 normals, 1945-present extremes
Month	Jan	Feb	Mar	Apr	May	Jun	Jul	Aug	Sep	Oct	Nov	Dec	Year
Record high °C (°F)	21.7 (71.1)	25.0 (77.0)	26.9 (80.4)	31.0 (87.8)	34.5 (94.1)	39.4 (102.9)	40.9 (105.6)	41.1 (106.0)	39.0 (102.2)	34.8 (94.6)	24.8 (76.6)	20.2 (68.4)	41.1 (106.0)
Mean daily maximum °C (°F)	9.1 (48.4)	11.6 (52.9)	15.2 (59.4)	17.3 (63.1)	21.8 (71.2)	27.3 (81.1)	30.6 (87.1)	30.2 (86.4)	25.5 (77.9)	19.6 (67.3)	13.0 (55.4)	9.9 (49.8)	19.3 (66.7)
Daily mean °C (°F)	4.2 (39.6)	5.5 (41.9)	8.4 (47.1)	10.7 (51.3)	14.7 (58.5)	19.1 (66.4)	21.6 (70.9)	21.3 (70.3)	17.4 (63.3)	12.9 (55.2)	7.6 (45.7)	4.9 (40.8)	12.4 (54.3)
Mean daily minimum °C (°F)	−0.7 (30.7)	−0.8 (30.6)	1.5 (34.7)	4.0 (39.2)	7.5 (45.5)	10.9 (51.6)	12.5 (54.5)	12.3 (54.1)	9.3 (48.7)	6.1 (43.0)	2.2 (36.0)	−0.2 (31.6)	5.4 (41.7)
Record low °C (°F)	−15.6 (3.9)	−20.0 (−4.0)	−9.0 (15.8)	−5.5 (22.1)	−2.3 (27.9)	2.0 (35.6)	4.5 (40.1)	4.2 (39.6)	0.3 (32.5)	−4.7 (23.5)	−10.6 (12.9)	−12.0 (10.4)	−20.0 (−4.0)
Average precipitation mm (inches)	31.5 (1.24)	24.6 (0.97)	27.5 (1.08)	37.7 (1.48)	38.5 (1.52)	21.6 (0.85)	8.1 (0.32)	11.9 (0.47)	28.6 (1.13)	49.8 (1.96)	39.0 (1.54)	36.1 (1.42)	354.9 (13.98)
Average precipitation days (≥ 1 mm)	5.9	5.2	5.5	8.0	6.7	3.5	1.6	1.7	4.1	7.6	7.5	6.0	63.3
Average snowy days	1.6	1.7	0.8	0.4	0	0	0	0	0	0	0.3	0.9	5.7
Average relative humidity (%)	82	72	63	62	56	49	46	49	58	70	78	82	64
Mean monthly sunshine hours	121	167	214	237	285	330	372	344	267	198	132	115	2,782
Percentage possible sunshine	41	55	58	60	64	73	81	80	71	57	45	40	60
Source: Agencia Estatal de Meteorologia

Climate data for Salamanca 775 m (2,543 ft) 1991-2020 normals, 1970-present extremes
Month	Jan	Feb	Mar	Apr	May	Jun	Jul	Aug	Sep	Oct	Nov	Dec	Year
Record high °C (°F)	21.7 (71.1)	22.5 (72.5)	27.2 (81.0)	30.3 (86.5)	34.7 (94.5)	39.1 (102.4)	40.8 (105.4)	40.1 (104.2)	37.5 (99.5)	34.3 (93.7)	24.5 (76.1)	20.5 (68.9)	40.8 (105.4)
Mean daily maximum °C (°F)	9.5 (49.1)	12.1 (53.8)	15.3 (59.5)	17.5 (63.5)	21.7 (71.1)	27.3 (81.1)	30.8 (87.4)	30.6 (87.1)	25.5 (77.9)	19.7 (67.5)	13.4 (56.1)	10.2 (50.4)	19.5 (67.0)
Daily mean °C (°F)	5.0 (41.0)	6.3 (43.3)	9.0 (48.2)	11.3 (52.3)	15.0 (59.0)	19.7 (67.5)	22.6 (72.7)	22.4 (72.3)	18.4 (65.1)	13.6 (56.5)	8.4 (47.1)	5.7 (42.3)	13.1 (55.6)
Mean daily minimum °C (°F)	0.4 (32.7)	0.5 (32.9)	2.6 (36.7)	5.0 (41.0)	8.2 (46.8)	12.1 (53.8)	14.3 (57.7)	14.2 (57.6)	11.0 (51.8)	7.5 (45.5)	3.5 (38.3)	1.1 (34.0)	6.7 (44.1)
Record low °C (°F)	−13.4 (7.9)	−10.5 (13.1)	−8.2 (17.2)	−5.0 (23.0)	−1.4 (29.5)	3.0 (37.4)	5.8 (42.4)	4.5 (40.1)	1.4 (34.5)	−4.8 (23.4)	−7.6 (18.3)	−9.6 (14.7)	−13.4 (7.9)
Average precipitation mm (inches)	32.2 (1.27)	22.1 (0.87)	27.5 (1.08)	41.2 (1.62)	39.6 (1.56)	21.7 (0.85)	9.4 (0.37)	10.3 (0.41)	31.3 (1.23)	51.6 (2.03)	35.5 (1.40)	33.3 (1.31)	355.7 (14)
Average precipitation days (≥ 1 mm)	5.7	4.7	5.6	7.9	6.6	3.6	1.6	1.4	4.5	7.3	7.2	5.8	61.9
Average relative humidity (%)	78	69	64	63	58	52	49	51	58	67	75	79	64
Source: Agencia Estatal de Meteorologia

== Demographics ==
Historical population
Year	Pop.	±%
1842	14,012	—
1857	15,551	+11.0%
1877	19,840	+27.6%
1887	23,529	+18.6%
1900	25,625	+8.9%
1910	30,710	+19.8%
1920	32,812	+6.8%
1930	45,040	+37.3%
1940	66,286	+47.2%
1950	76,577	+15.5%
1960	90,694	+18.4%
1970	122,241	+34.8%
1981	153,981	+26.0%
1991	162,888	+5.8%
2001	156,368	−4.0%
2011	151,658	−3.0%
2021	143,549	−5.3%
Source: INE

As of 2024, the population of Salamanca is 144,458, of whom 45.1% are male and 54.9% are female, compared to the nationwide average of 49.0% and 51.0% respectively. People under 16 years old make up 11.6% of the population, and people over 65 years old make up 28.9%, compared to the nationwide average of 14.3% and 20.4% respectively.

As of 2024, the foreign-born population is 19,214, equal to 13.3% of the total population. The 5 largest foreign nationalities are Peruvians (2,194), Colombians (2,179), Venezuelans (1,740), Hondurans (1,328) and Moroccans (1,289).

Foreign population by country of birth (2024)
Country	Population
Peru	2,194
Colombia	2,179
Venezuela	1,740
Honduras	1,328
Morocco	1,289
Bolivia	752
Dominican Republic	688
France	660
Brazil	629
Cuba	610
Ecuador	583
China	576
Argentina	509
Portugal	388
Mexico	387

== Symbols ==
Heraldic representation of the municipal coat of arms

=== Coat of arms ===
The municipal heraldic shield was approved on 11 June 1996 with the following coat of arms:

"Shield parted. First, of silver, with a stone bridge, pierced in sable, on which is passing a bull arrested in sable, and behind it a fig tree of sinople, uprooted. Second, of gold with four gules poles; bordure of azure with eight silver pate crosses. Manteled in silver chief, with two lions, natural, on the flanks and facing each other. To the bell, the Spanish Royal Crown, open and without diadems"

— Official Gazette of Castile and León, no. 118 of June 20, 1996.

=== Flag ===
The municipal flag was approved with the following textual description:

"Rectangular flag of proportions 2:3, red with the coat of arms of Salamanca in the center"

== Monuments ==
The Old City of Salamanca was declared a UNESCO World Heritage Site in 1988. Places of interest in the city, many of them within the "Barrio Viejo" Old Quarter of the city.

=== Squares and public spaces ===
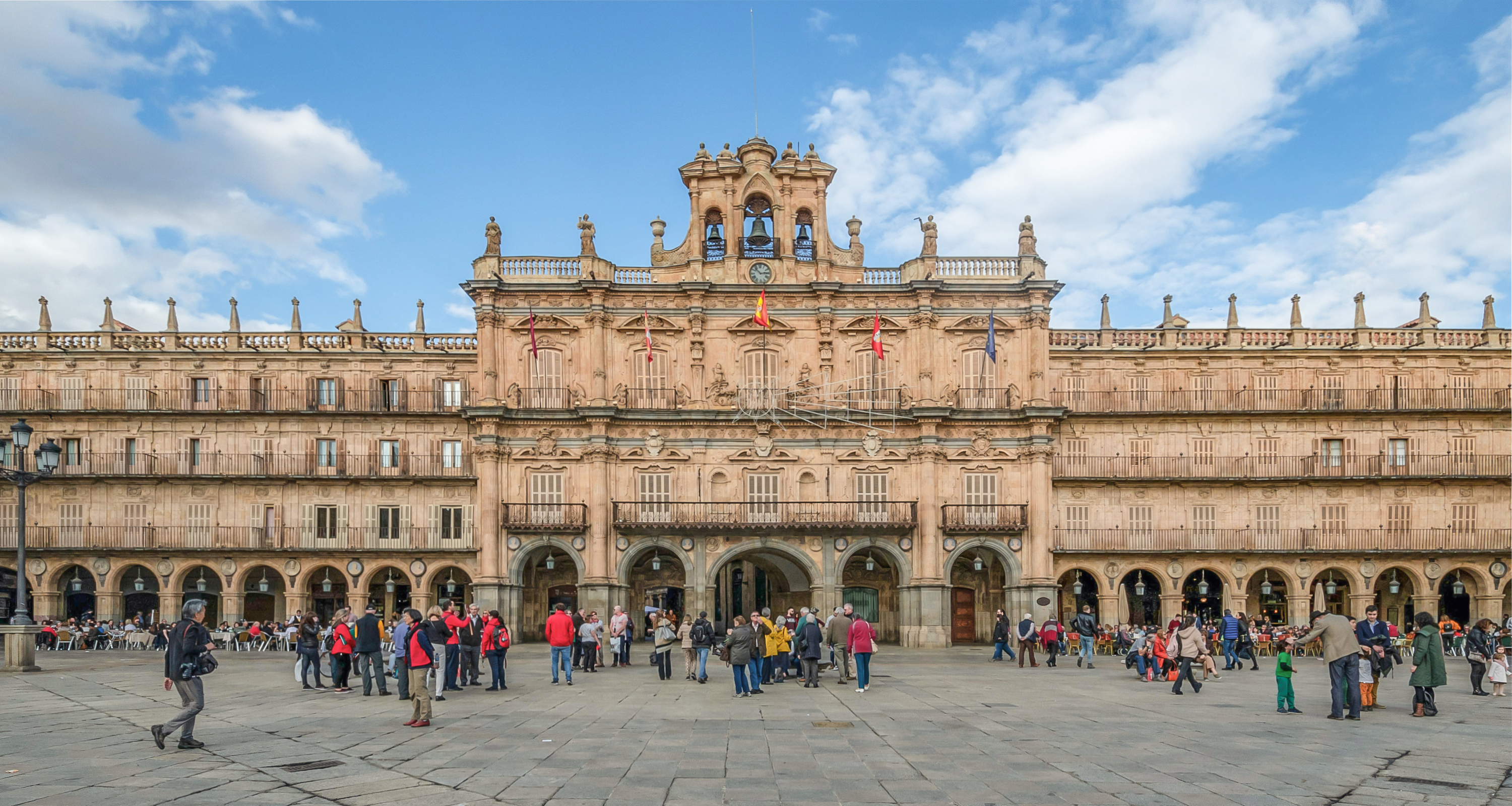
Main facade (Town hall) of the Baroque Plaza Mayor de Salamanca, square built between 1729 and 1756.

- The Plaza Mayor de Salamanca: Baroque style, designed by the architects Alberto and Nicolás Churriguera, it is the most important public space and heart of the city. The main building of the square is the City hall of Salamanca.
- Campo de San Francisco: First public garden of the city on land of the former Convent of San Francisco el Real.
- Huerto de Calixto y Melibea: garden near the cathedrals, where, according to some, the plot of the novel La Celestina by Fernando de Rojas is situated. Next to it are remains of the Roman walls.
- Plaza del Corrillo: small square attached to the Plaza Mayor. To the left is the Romanesque church of San Martín and to the right a series of houses with arcades formed by stone columns ending in footings representing the days of the week (a moon for Monday, a Mars for Tuesday, etcetera).

=== Religious buildings ===
==== Cathedrals ====
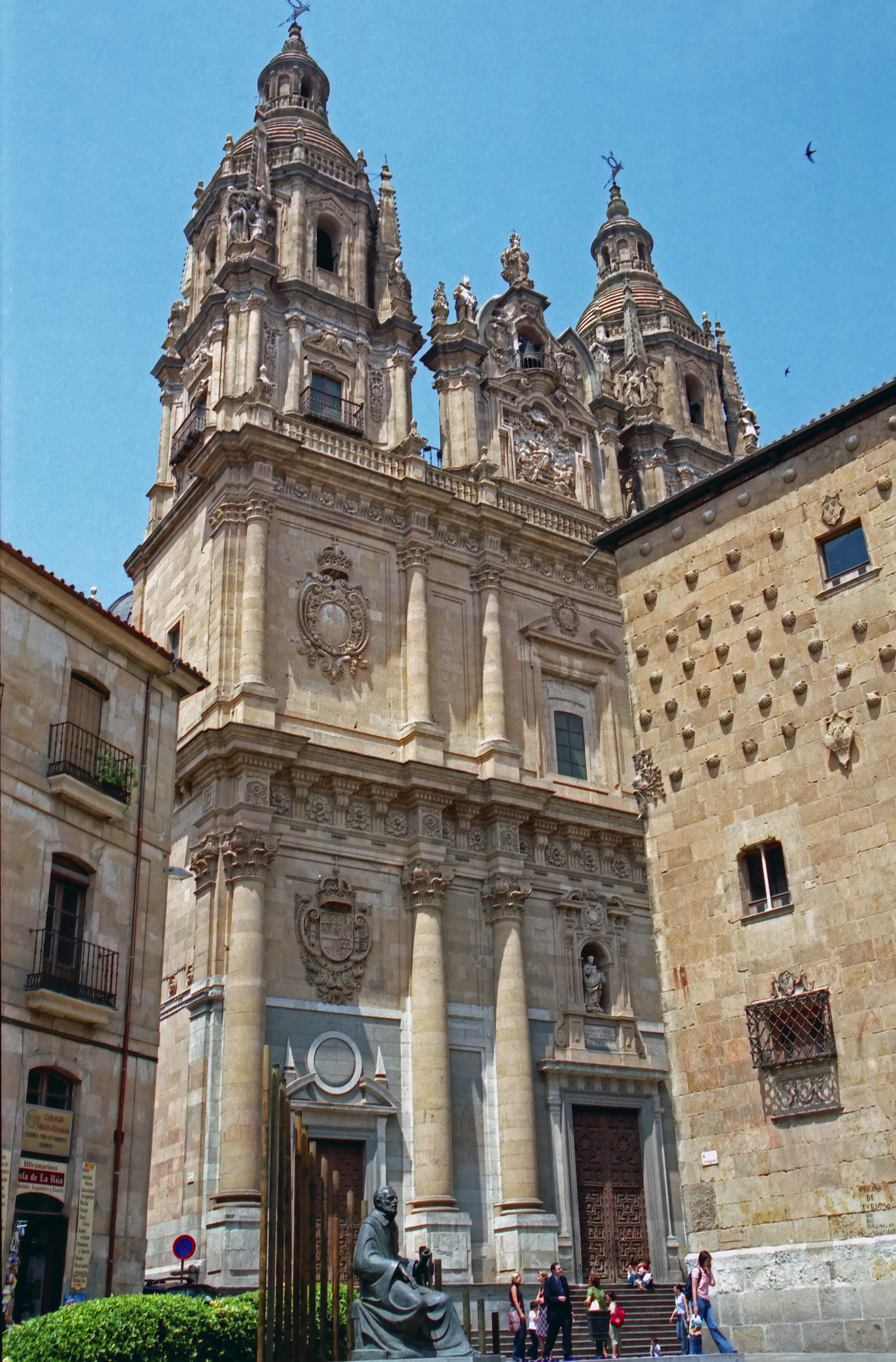
Facade of La Clerecía church, built between 1617 and 1754.

Salamanca has two cathedrals, the Old cathedral, from the 12th century and of Romanesque style, and the New cathedral, much larger, begun in the 16th century in Gothic architecture style and completed in the 18th century. The place where the two meet is known as Patio Chico and is one of the most charming corners of the city.

The main tower of the new cathedral was built over the bell tower of the old cathedral. In it is still visible a crack originated by the Lisbon earthquake of 1755.

==== La Clerecía ====
La Clerecía is currently the seat of the Pontifical University of Salamanca. Its construction began in 1617 and was completed a century and a half later as Espíritu Santo Royal College, of the Jesuits. It is of Baroque style. It differs the college, with an interesting cloister, and the church, with an impressive facade of three bodies, two twin towers of 50 meters high and a huge dome. The name La Clerecía is due to the fact that it belonged to the Real Clerecía de San Marcos after the expulsion of the Jesuits.

==== Convento de San Esteban ====
The Convento de San Esteban is a Dominican convent of the 16th century. The Plateresque facade, with its triumphal arch shape, is an authentic jewel of the Renaissance of Salamanca. Impressive baroque altarpiece by José Benito de Churriguera. Also noteworthy is the Renaissance Cloister of los Reyes.

==== Convento de las Dueñas ====
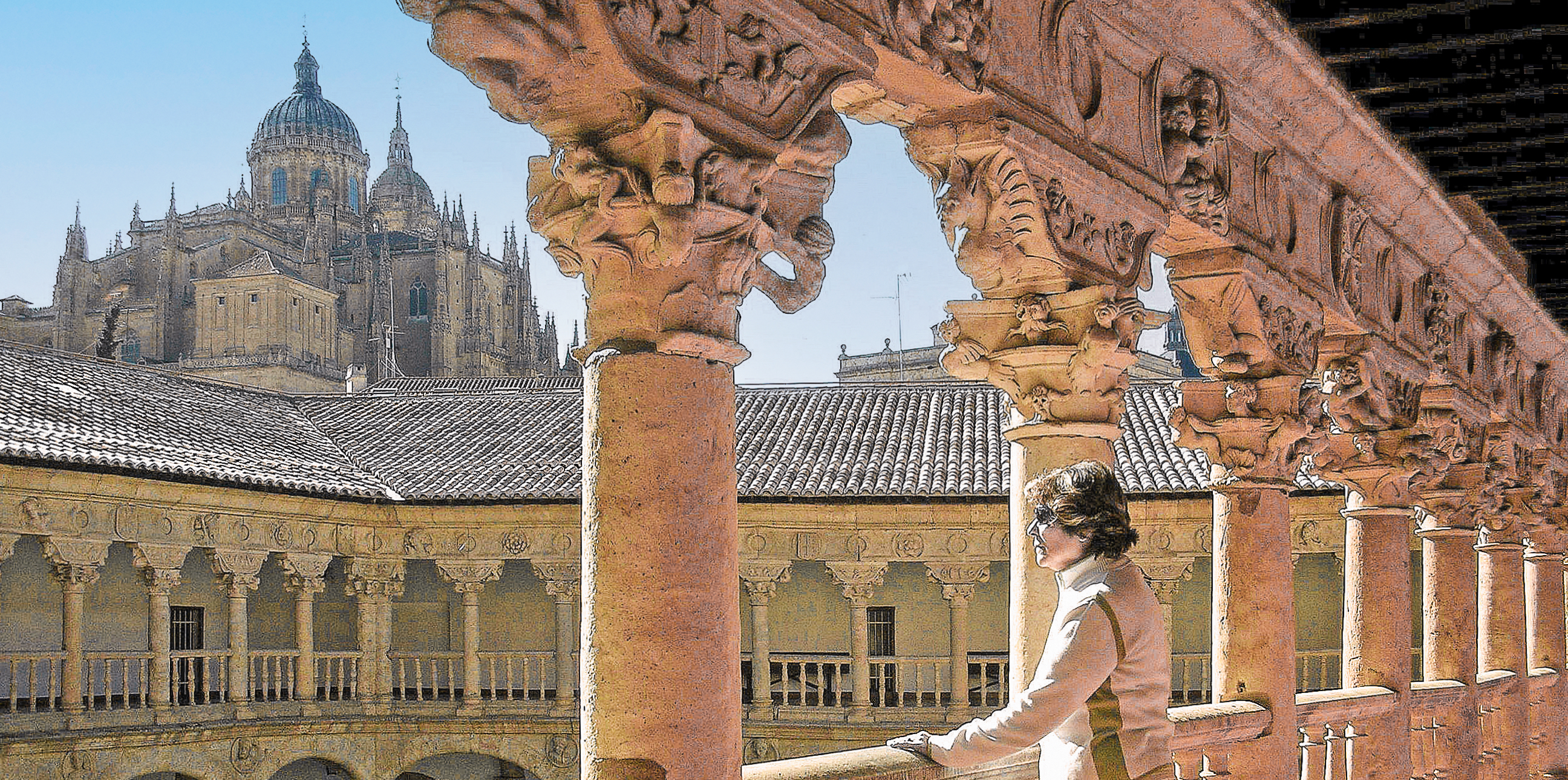
Cloister of the Convento de las Dueñas, convent built between 1419 and 1533.

The Convento de las Dueñas was built in 1533 and the interest of the whole building is mainly focused on the magnificent cloister, which had to adapt its plan to the layout of the primitive dependencies, so it developed a unique irregular pentagonal plan. It consists of two floors. The lower one has segmental arches on columns and medallions with heads in the spandrels, and the upper one is linteled with columns and footings. The capitals, of which the sculptor is unknown, are of inexhaustible fantasy and variety, and monsters and grotesques were carved in the spandrels.

==== Others ====
- Chapel of la Vera Cruz: Baroque temple with Renaissance façade, seat of the five times centennial Cofradía de la Vera Cruz de Salamanca. It houses countless works of art.
- Colegio de Calatrava: built in the 18th century, on the initiative of the Order of Calatrava, it currently houses the Casa de la Iglesia (House of the Church).

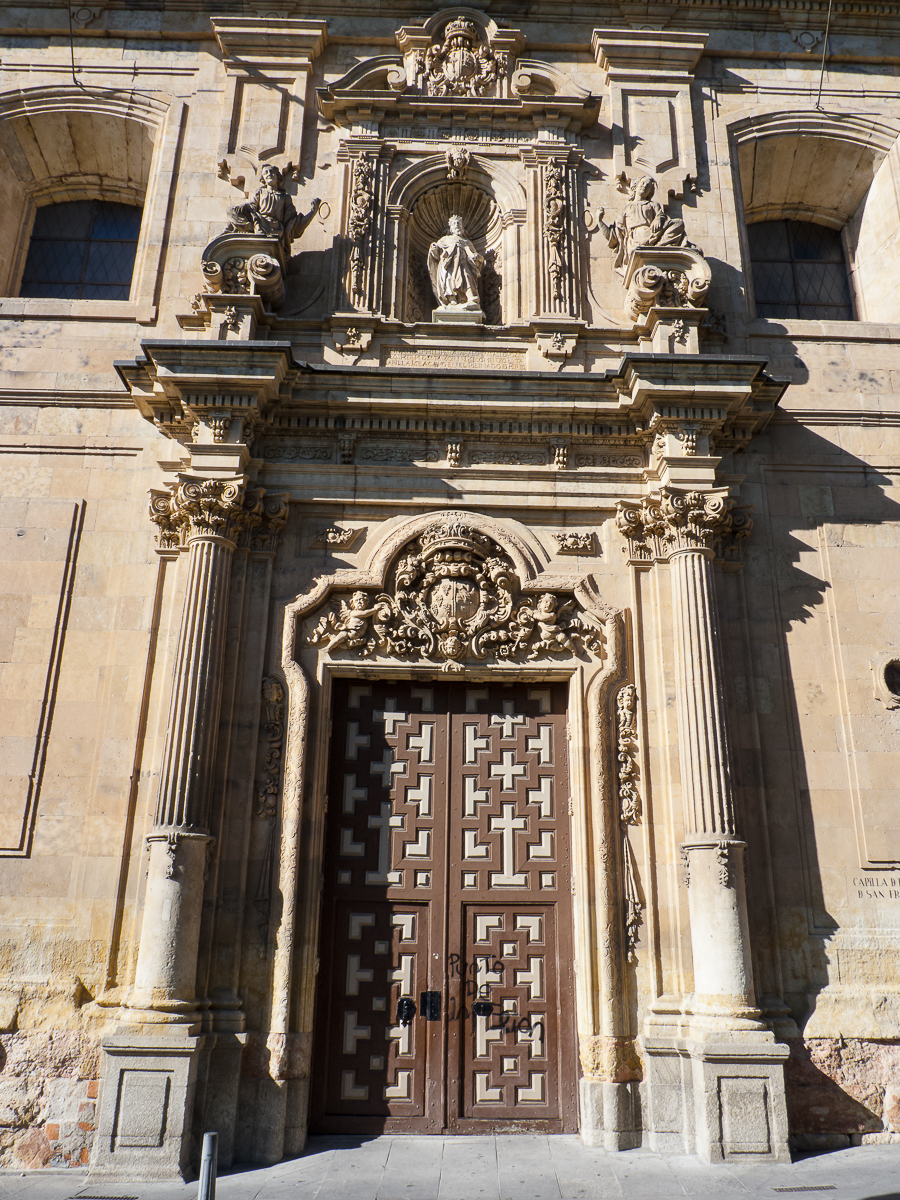
Portal of the Convento de los Capuchinos.

- Convento de las Agustinas e Iglesia de la Purísima: in the church there is a picture of the Immaculate Conception painted by José de Ribera. It is the only construction of totally Italian space and decoration in Spain.
- Convento de las Isabeles: the interior has a single nave and a main chapel containing several tombs of the Solís family, Gothic decoration and several altarpieces, the most outstanding being the altarpiece of Saint Isabel of Hungary attributed to Nicolás Florentino. Also noteworthy is the artesonado of the lower choir, Mudéjar style, which is considered the oldest in the city. The vault of the church is of neo-Gothic style of 1911, designed by Santiago Madrigal to replace the coffered ceiling in poor condition.
- Convento de San Antonio el Real (1736): of Baroque style, its remains are divided between the Teatro Liceo and a store where they can be visited.
- Convento de la Anunciación (also called of las Úrsulas): founded by Archbishop Fonseca in 1512. The exterior apse of Gothic style stands out. Inside, the Baroque altarpiece and the tomb of the founder, Renaissance, the work of Diego de Siloé.
- Convento de la Trinidad: Former Palacio de Montellano adapted in the 16th century to house a Trinitarian convent.
- Monasterio de Nuestra Señora de la Victoria, of the Hieronymites, completed in 1513, half-destroyed by the French in the early 19th century, in the Peninsular War, it is currently integrated within the manufacturing facilities, of the 19th century, of the Grupo Mirat.
- Ermita de Nuestra Señora de la Misericordia (16th-17th centuries): small baroque temple that began to be built in 1389 in the Plaza de San Cristóbal. Nowadays very deteriorated, it is a printing press, while its bell-gable decorates the church of the barrio de Pizarrales.
- Former church of las Bernardas: work of Rodrigo Gil de Hontañón. Prototype of the Salamanca churches of the 16th century. The shell-shaped chevet stands out. Today it is inside the School of San José de Calasanz.
- Church del Carmen de Abajo: Chapel of the Lay Carmelites integrated into the Convento de San Andrés. It is the only remaining part of the aforementioned convent that disappeared in the 19th century.
- Church of San Benito: Gothic church built under the patronage of Alonso II de Fonseca, pantheon of the Maldonado family.
- Church of San Julián: Romanesque church later reformed.
- Church of San Marcos: Romanesque church near the route along which the north wall of the city used to run. Externally it has a circular plan with three naves and apses in the interior.
- Church of San Martín: Romanesque church with Gothic, Renaissance and Baroque reforms, annexed to the Plaza Mayor.
- Church of San Pablo: Baroque temple belonging to the old convent of the Trinitarians, it houses the image of Jesus Rescued, very venerated in the city. It is a parish seat, governed by the Diocesan Priest Operators.

Church of San Sebastián, la Rúa Mayor and the Plaza de Anaya.

- Church of Santa María de los Caballeros: Renaissance church with baroque window camarín window to calle Bordadores.
- Church of Santiago del Arrabal: remains of the church (modern reconstruction) in Romanesque-Mudéjar style.
- Church of Santo Tomás Cantuariense: Romanesque church founded in honor of Saint Thomas Becket, archbishop of Canterbury in 1175, just five years after his death and two after his canonization. It consists of three apses and a nave with a wooden roof. It forms a parish next to San Pablo's, governed by the Diocesan Priest Operators.
- Convento del Rollo: modern work of Antonio Fernández Alba and National Prize of Architecture in 1963.

=== University buildings ===
- University: set of buildings that made up the old University of Salamanca, including the Escuelas Mayores, the Escuelas Menores and the Hospital del Estudio (current rectorate), located around the square called Patio de Escuelas. In this same square is the house of Doctor Álvarez Abarca or of the Doctors of the Queen (15th century), whose facade is Gothic with Renaissance details and which today is the Museum of Salamanca.
- Casa-Museo de Unamuno (18th century): former house of the rectors of the university. It is preserved as it was when Miguel de Unamuno held this position.

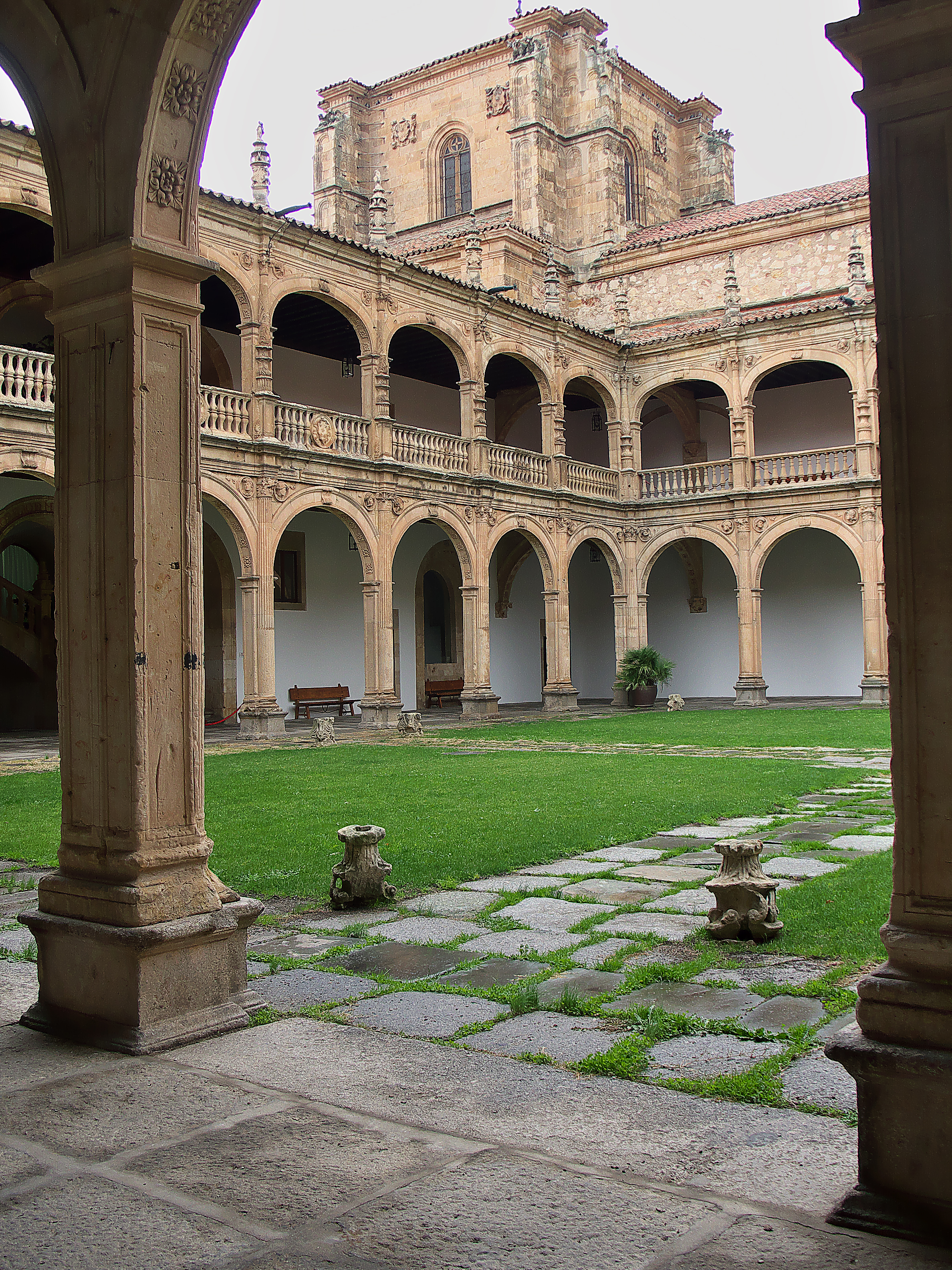
Colegio Mayor de Santiago el Zebedeo, built between 1519 and 1578.

- Colegio Mayor de Santiago el Zebedeo, also called "del Arzobispo Fonseca" or "de los Irlandeses" (16th century).
- Colegio de San Ambrosio (1719): nowadays it is General Archive of the Spanish Civil War. It houses documents and objects seized by Franco's troops and his allies during and at the end of the Spanish Civil War. Although throughout the post-war period its basic objective was to preserve information related to organizations and individuals potentially opposed to the Franco regime and, consequently, to use this information for repressive purposes, since the return of democracy this building would become one of the most important archives that existed in Spain to investigate the historical period of the Second Republic. Many of the documents and objects that still remain in the archive are related to Freemasonry, including various pieces of furniture with which a Masonic lodge has been reconstructed.
- Colegio Trilingüe: founded in 1554 for the teaching of Latin, Greek and Hebrew. Designed by Rodrigo Gil de Hontañón, part of the original courtyard is preserved, remade from 1829, in the Faculty of Physics.
- Palacio de Anaya which was the last seat of the Colegio Mayor de San Bartolomé or Colegio de Anaya, founded in the 15th century by Diego de Anaya, disappeared at the beginning of the 19th century. It is currently the Faculty of Philology. Next to the building is the church of San Sebastián, former chapel of the college, and la Hospedería, work of Joaquín de Churriguera.
- Colegio Santa Cruz de Cañizares (16th century): Professional Conservatory of Music. Of it only remains of the old chapel, today incorporated into the auditorium of the conservatory, and the main facade, in Plateresque style, are preserved.
- Colegio de San Pelayo: founded in the middle of the 16th century. Since 1990 and after a restoration, it houses the Faculty of Geography and History.

=== Palaces and palatial houses ===
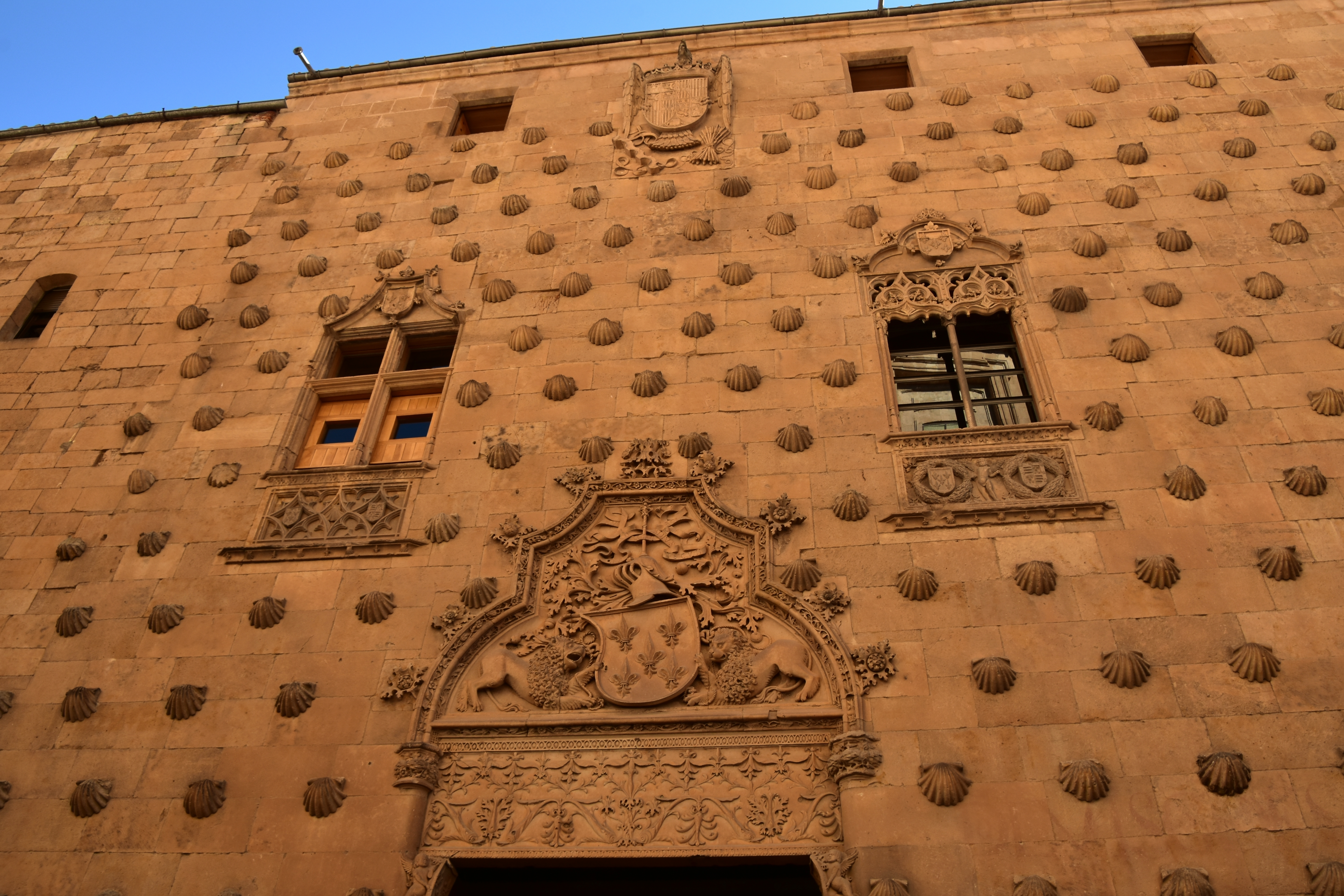
Facade of the Gothic Casa de las Conchas (House of Shells) (1493-1517).

- Casa de las Conchas (House of Shells): it was built at the end of the 15th century. Of civilian Gothic style, its façade is decorated with around 350 scallop shells, distinctive of the Order of Santiago. Also important are the Gothic grilles on the windows. It currently houses a public library.
- Casa de Don Diego Maldonado: Plateresque palace from the 16th century. It houses the Hispanic-Brazilian Cultural Foundation and the Center for Brazilian Studies of the University of Salamanca.
- Casa de doña María la Brava: Gothic building of the 15th century, prototype of the noble mansions of the time. Its owner, María Rodríguez de Monroy, was the head of one of the two bandos into which the city was divided in the 15th century. She cut off the heads of the murderers of her sons. It is located in the Plaza de los Bandos.
- Casa Lis: small Art Nouveau palace of 1905 with iron facade. Built on the wall. It houses the Art Nouveau and Art Deco collections donated by Manuel Ramos Andrade.
- Casa de las Muertes (early 16th century): built by Juan de Álava, and so called because of the skulls that decorate the facade. On one occasion when the building was renovated, the skulls were rounded and turned into balls, but it remained so gloomy denomination and this was enough reason for the popular imagination to invent a legend that ran for many years. According to it, the name came from the fact that a woman was found dead in the house and no one could explain how the misfortune had happened. The curse weighed on the house and everyone who lived in it would die. This resulted in it remaining empty for a long time and people mysteriously lowered their voices as they passed by. Nowadays the spheres have been re-sculpted as skulls (much smaller than the original ones).

Palacio de la Salina (1538-1546), seat of the Diputación Provincial de Salamanca.

- Casa del Regidor Ovalle Prieto (13th century): Miguel de Unamuno died there.
- Casa de Saint Teresa of Ávila (16th century): here the saint stayed when she visited Salamanca in 1570 to found a convent and here she wrote the poem I live without living in me.
- Casa de los Sexmeros de la Tierra (15th century): doorway with semicircular arch, Gothic tracery window. Headquarters of the Chamber of Commerce and Industry of Salamanca.
- Casa de las Viejas (17th century): former asylum for widows without resources, currently home to the Castile and León Film Archive. Permanent exhibition of apparatus related to cinema and its history, owned by the Salamancan filmmaker Basilio Martín Patino.
- Fonda Veracruz: this building served as an inn until the middle of the 20th century, and has a courtyard with wooden galleries with two staircases. It was a hotel management's school until 2019.
- Palacio de San Boal (15th century): sgraffito façade very similar to that of Arias Corvelle. It houses the Escuela de Nobles y Bellas Artes de San Eloy.
- Palacio de Castellanos (15th-16th centuries): the palace of the Marquises of Castellanos was begun at the end of the 15th century, although its facade dates from the end of the 19th century, so it combines Gothic and Neoclassical styles. With a powerful interior Gothic courtyard, this building currently functions as a hotel.

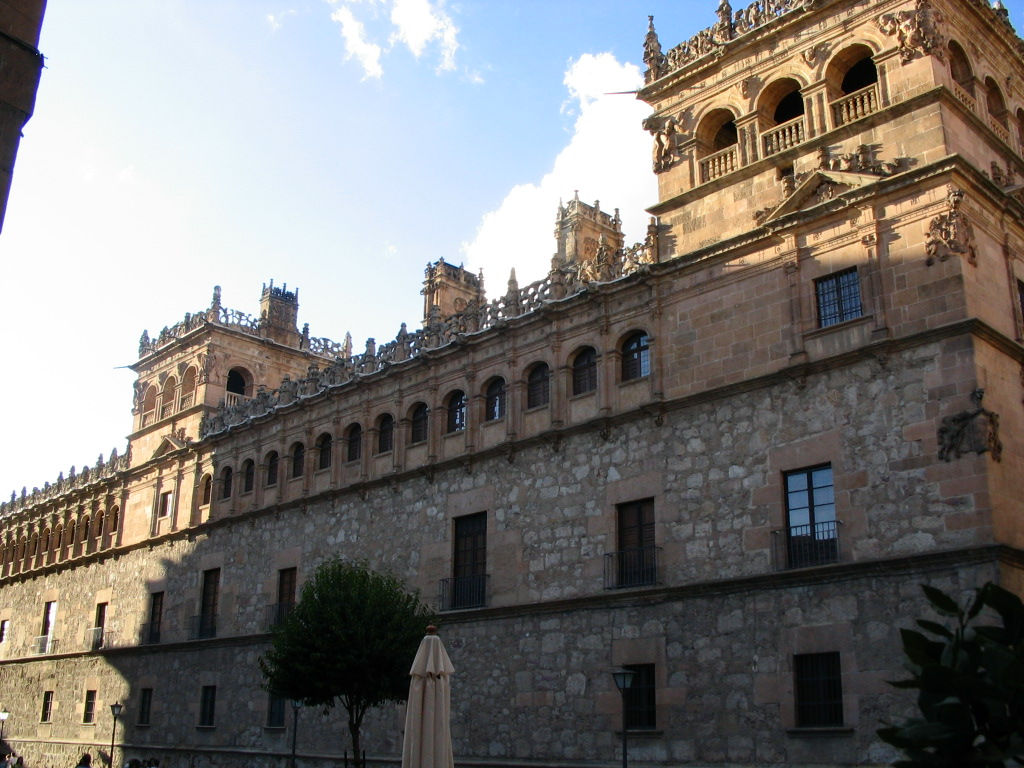
Plateresque Palacio de Monterrey, built between 1539 and 1559.

- Palacio de Garci Grande (16th century): Renaissance façade and chamfered windows on the corner, unique in the city. Headquarters of the Regional Savings Bank (Caja Duero).
- Palacio de Monterrey: it was built in the 16th century and is in the Plateresque style. It belongs to the house of Alba and its towers and chimneys stand out. Only one of the four blocks that would compose the initially conceived complex was built.
- Palacio de Orellana (16th century): building of classicist architecture with mannerist influences. The L shaped courtyard and the staircase stand out.
- Palacio de Rodríguez de Figueroa (1545): it has interesting facades on calles Concejo and Zamora and an interior courtyard. Today is the Casino of Salamanca.
- Palacio de la Salina (1546): Renaissance, work of Rodrigo Gil de Hontañón. Since 1884 it has been the seat of the Diputación Provincial.

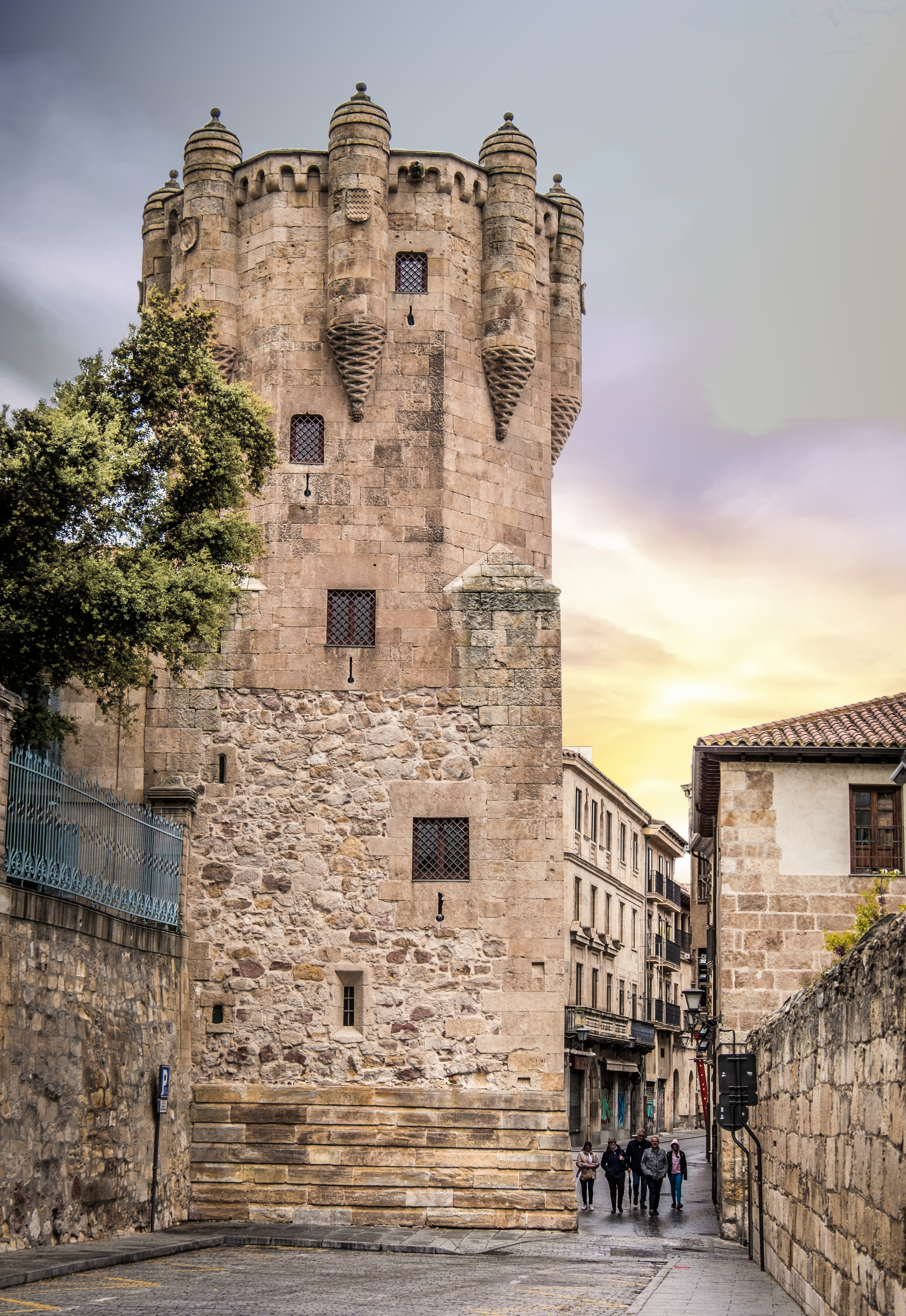
Torre del Clavero (15th century)

- Palacio de Arias Corvelle (15th century): facade decorated with sgraffitos. It was a trade school and later a business school. Since 1999 it houses the Hispanic-Japanese Cultural Center of the University of Salamanca. In the same square is the church of San Boal (17th century).
- Palacio de Solís (15th century): in this palace was celebrated the wedding between Philip II of Spain and Maria Manuela of Portugal in 1543. On the site, José María de la Vega Samper designed a Neoplateresque building as the Telefónica headquarters, which was inaugurated in 1930 and in which he included the remains of the front and the balcony of the palace that were the only things that were preserved.
- Torre del Aire: it is all that remains of the palace of the Dukes of Fermoselle, built in the 15th century. It has beautiful Gothic windows. It is currently a student residence.
- Torre del Clavero (15th century): remains of a palace, built by Francisco de Sotomayor, Clavero Mayor of the Order of Alcántara, around 1470. The lower body is quadrangular, while the upper one is octagonal adorned with eight cylindrical turrets.
- Torre de los Anaya (15th century): an old manor house in civilian Gothic style with a mullioned window and a three-sided courtyard. For years it was the seat of the Institute of Ibero-American and Portuguese Studies of the University of Salamanca, also known as Palacio de Abrantes.

== Economy ==
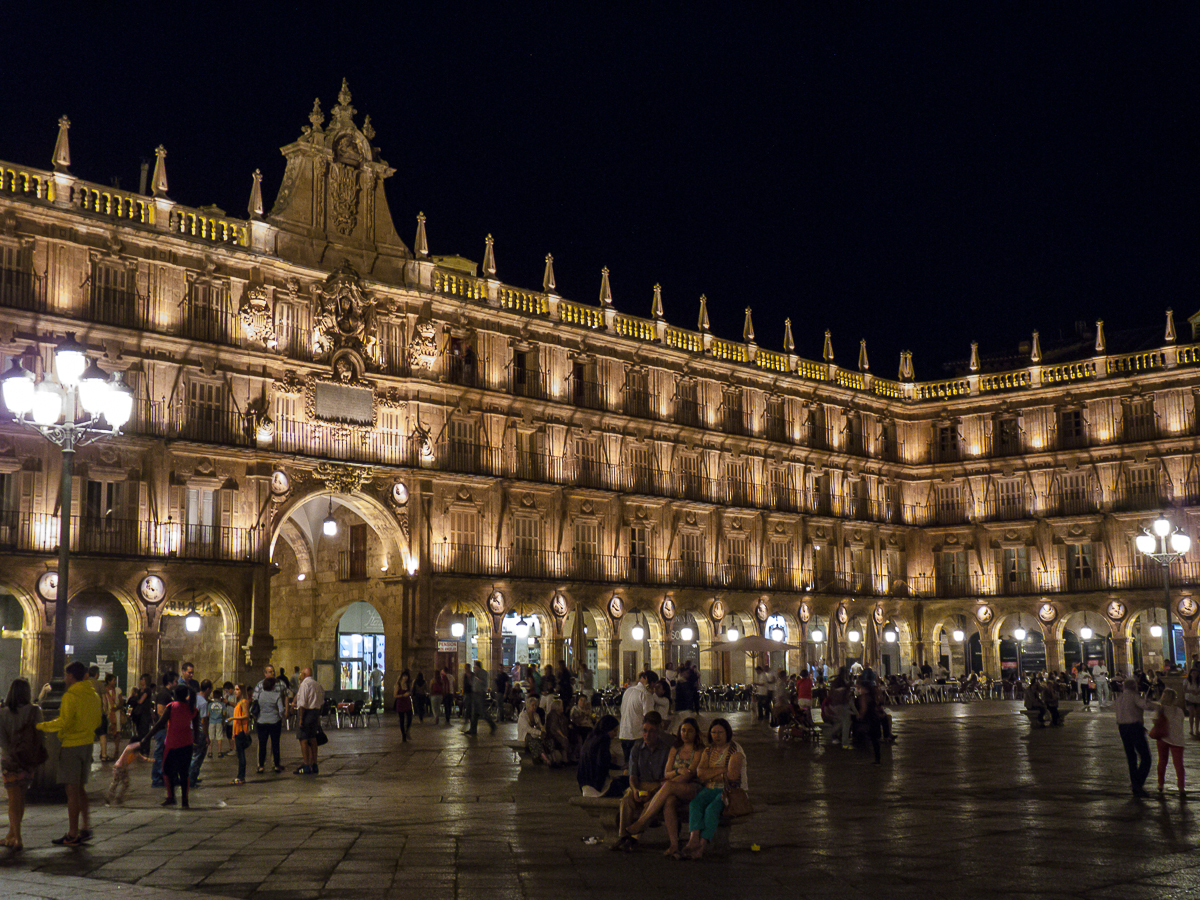
Plaza Mayor at night

The city's economy is dominated by the university and tourism, but other sectors including agriculture and livestock rearing along with construction and manufacturing are also significant. In December 2007, 83% of the working population, equivalent to 55,838, were employed in the service sector.

=== Industry ===
Industrial activity accounted for 5% of the working population, or 3,340 workers employed over 360 businesses. Two of the largest businesses, both of them numbered among the largest 100 enterprises in the region, are the veterinary vaccine manufacturer "Laboratorios Intervet", and the fertilizer specialist manufacturers S.A. Mirat, which is the city's oldest industrial company, having been established originally as a starch factory in 1812.

== Education ==
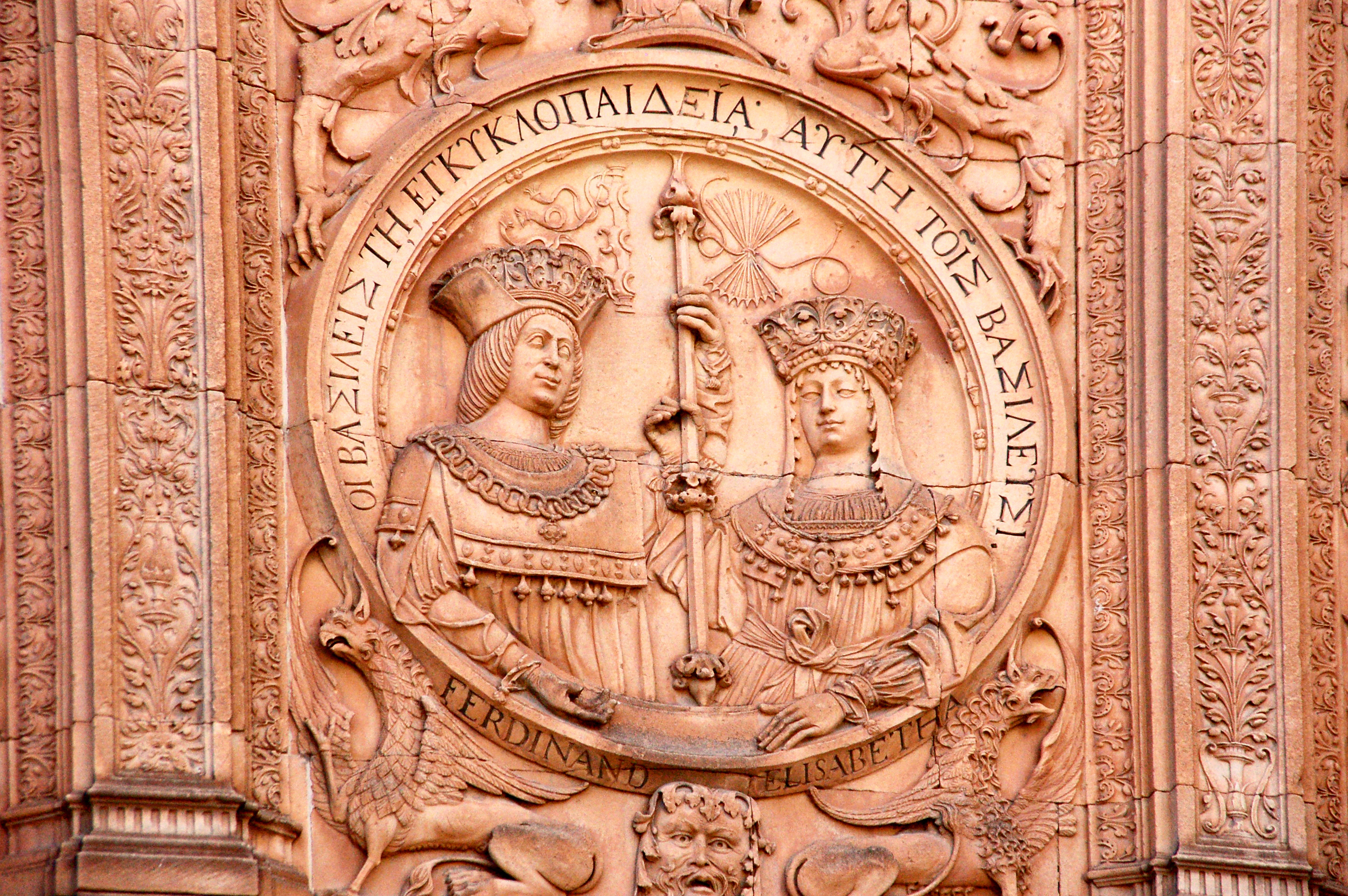
Detail of facade of the university (the Catholic Monarchs)

The University of Salamanca was founded in 1134 and in 1218 it was given the royal charter of foundation ("Estudio General") by Alfonso IX of León. It was the first university to receive the title of "University" in 1254. Under the patronage of the learned Alfonso X, its wealth and reputation greatly increased (1252–1282), and its schools of canon law and civil law attracted students even from the Universities of Paris and Bologna. In the 16th century, the city's fortunes depended on those of the university. About the time Christopher Columbus was lecturing there on his discoveries, Hernán Cortés took classes at Salamanca, but returned home in 1501 at the age of 17, without completing his course of study. (About ten years later the conquistador Francisco Vásquez de Coronado was born in Salamanca.)

== Transport ==
=== Road ===
Highways

- A50: Autovía de la Cultura: Ávila - Salamanca
- A62: Autovía de Castilla: Burgos - Valladolid - Salamanca - Ciudad Rodrigo.
- A66: Autovía Ruta de la Plata: Gijón - Oviedo - Mieres - Puerto de Pajares - León - Benavente - Zamora - Salamanca - Béjar - Plasencia - Mérida - Sevilla.
- SA-11: North access to Salamanca.
- SA-20: South access to Salamanca.

Other roads

- N-501: Ávila - Peñaranda de Bracamonte - Salamanca.
- N-620: Burgos - Venta de Baños - Valladolid - Tordesillas - Salamanca - Ciudad Rodrigo - Portugal.

=== Airport ===
Salamanca Airport, located in the military base of Matacán, is located about 14 km (9 mi) east of the city. However, the airport only provides seasonal routes to Palma de Mallorca. The nearest international airport is Madrid–Barajas Airport, located 228 km (142 mi) south east of the city.

=== Public transport ===
Salamanca main railway station, Vialia-Estación de Salamanca, is on the lines to Medina del Campo and to Ávila, and sees frequent service to both Madrid and Valladolid, and a daily service to Barcelona via Burgos and Zaragoza. A second railway station is called La Alamedilla, situated to the southwest of the main station, used as a terminal for a limited number of trains from Madrid and Valladolid.

There are 13 bus lines during the day and two night lines. Also, a tram line has been proposed.

== Culture ==
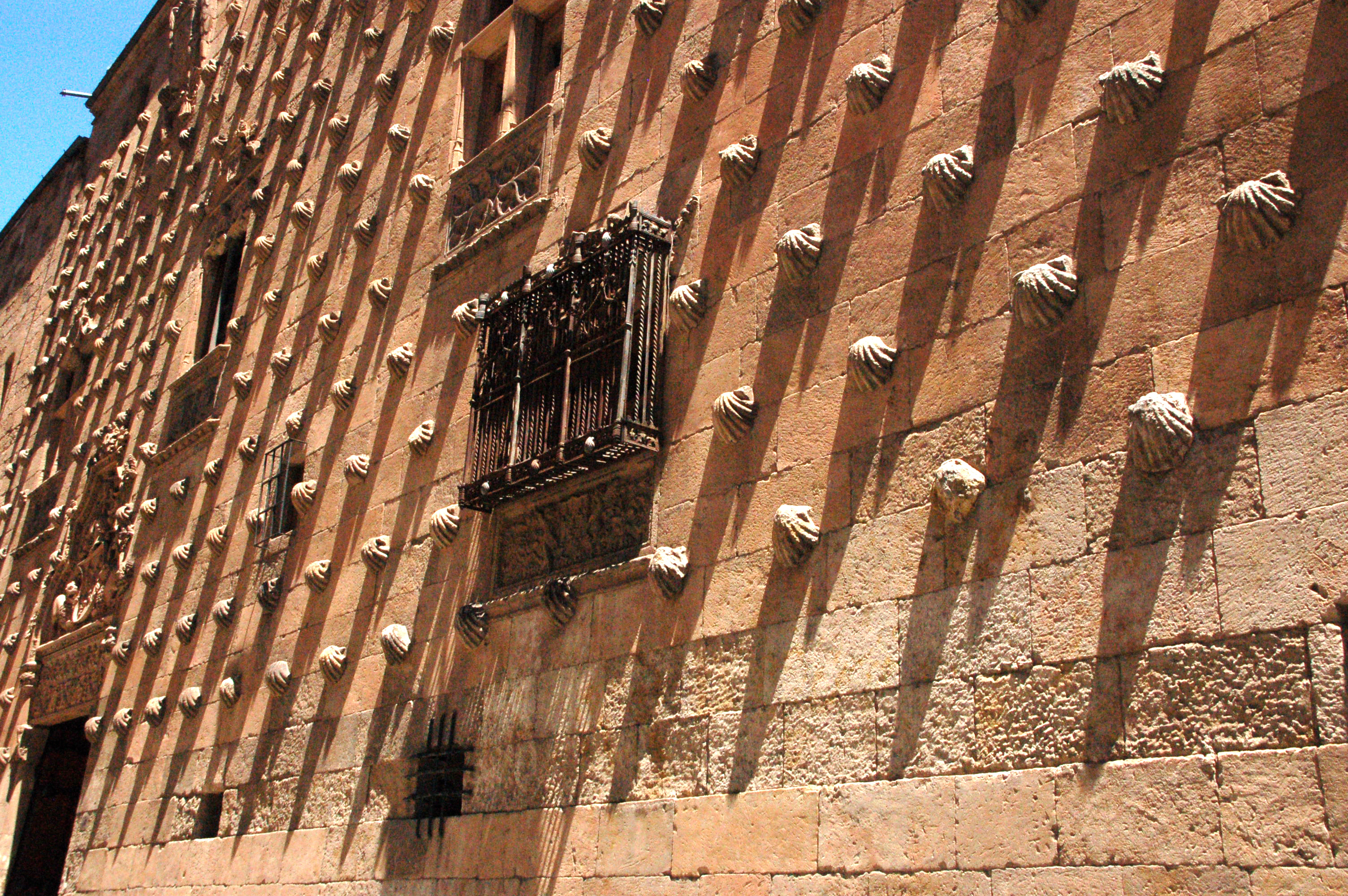
Casa de las Conchas

In 2002, Salamanca shared the title of European Capital of Culture with Bruges. In 2005, Salamanca celebrated the 250th anniversary of the construction of the Plaza Mayor with a number of European events (Plaza Mayor de Europa).

=== Festivals ===
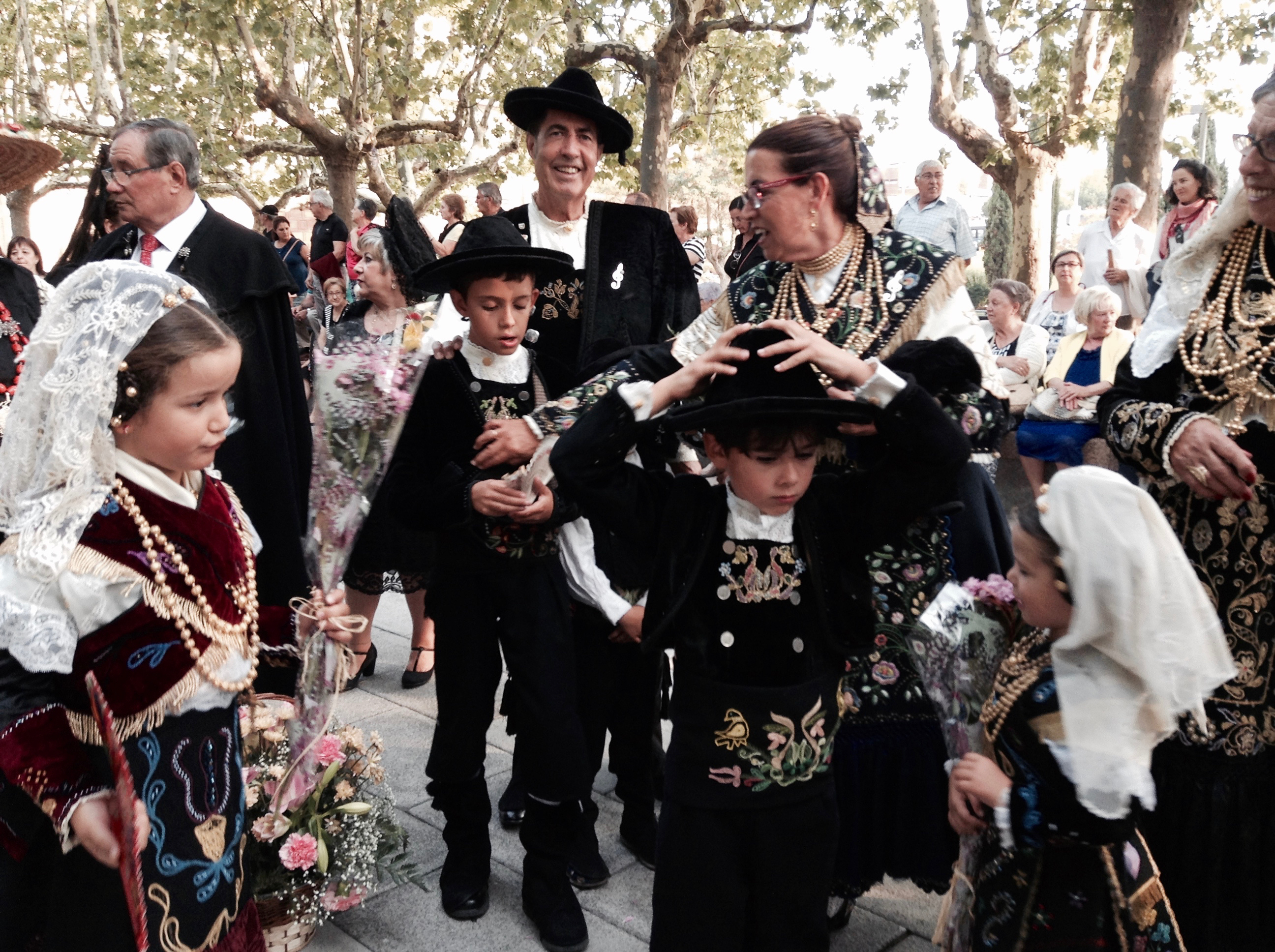
Floral Offering to the Virgen de la Vega

==== Holy Week ====
The Holy Week in Salamanca (Semana Santa) is the most well-known feast in the city. Salamanca is renowned for the solemn and sober processions celebrated during Holy Week. 18, 10,000 brothers or "cofrades", 50 floats or "pasos" celebrate the Passion of Christ with 24 processions and thousands of followers, tourist and visitors.

Some of the celebrations have been performed for centuries. The confraternities carry artistic pasos created by important Spanish artists such as Luis Salvador Carmona, Alejandro Carnicero or Mariano Benlliure. In 2003 the Semana Santa of Salamanca obtained the official declaration of International Touristic Interest.

==== Other ====
Salamanca is also famous throughout Spain and the rest of Europe for its celebrations of "Nochevieja Universitaria", loosely translated as "University New Year". It is usually held on the Thursday of the last week of school in December and two weeks before the real New Year's Eve. On this day, students congregate in the Plaza Mayor de Salamanca to watch free performances and take part in the countdown to midnight.

=== Cinema ===
The setting provided by the city has been featured in several films, including Ridley Scott's 1492: Conquest of Paradise and Miloš Forman's Goya's Ghosts. Alejandro Amenábar's 2019 historical film While at War is set in Salamanca and features scenes shot there. Salamanca was also the setting for the 2008 political thriller Vantage Point, although the movie was almost exclusively filmed in Mexico.

=== Gastronomy ===
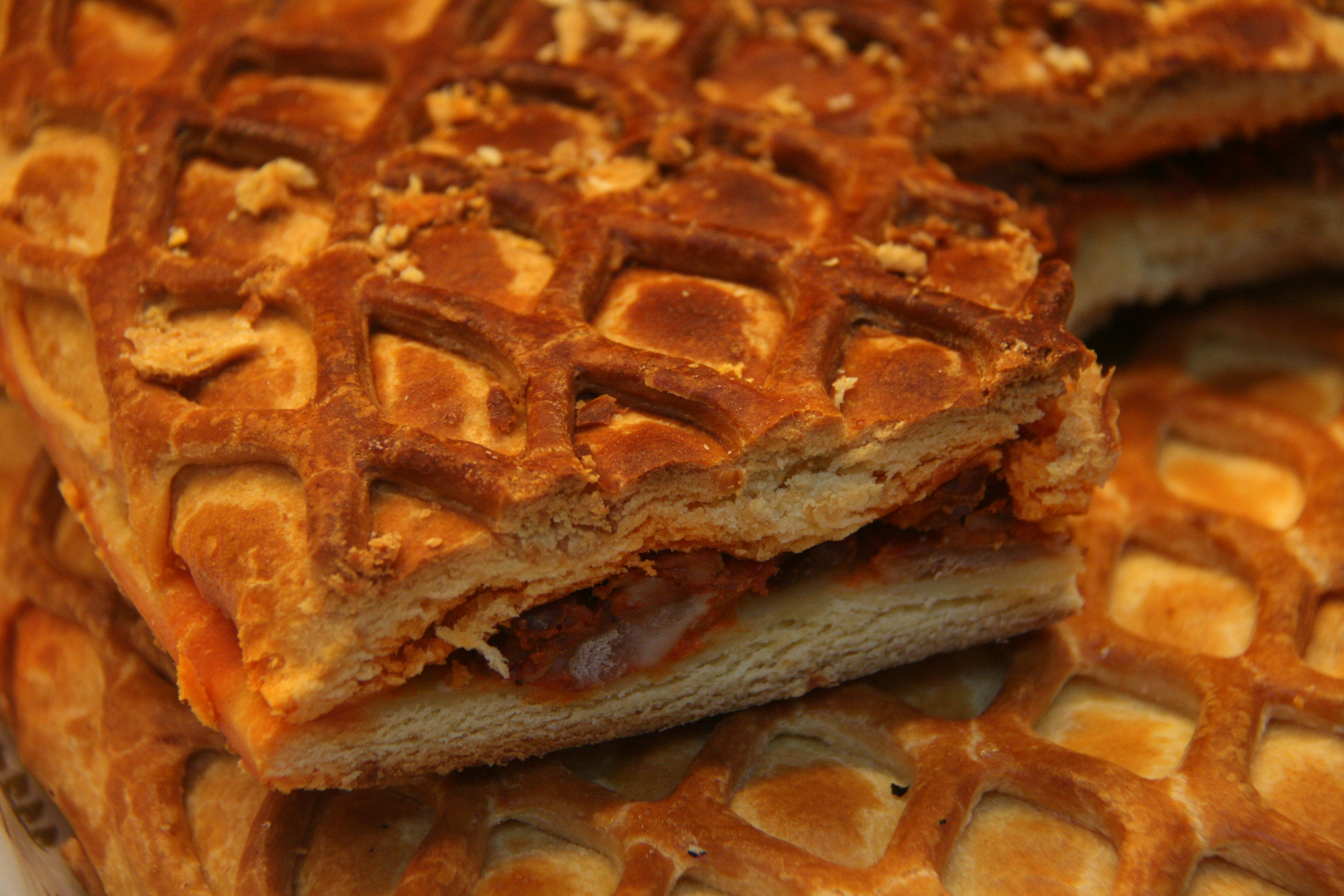
Typical hornazo

Among many local dishes, chanfaina (steamed rice with pork) is very popular. Another distinctive dish is the cocido, a slow-cooked chickpea-based casserole. However, hornazo, a meat pie, is the most popular dish.

== Sports ==
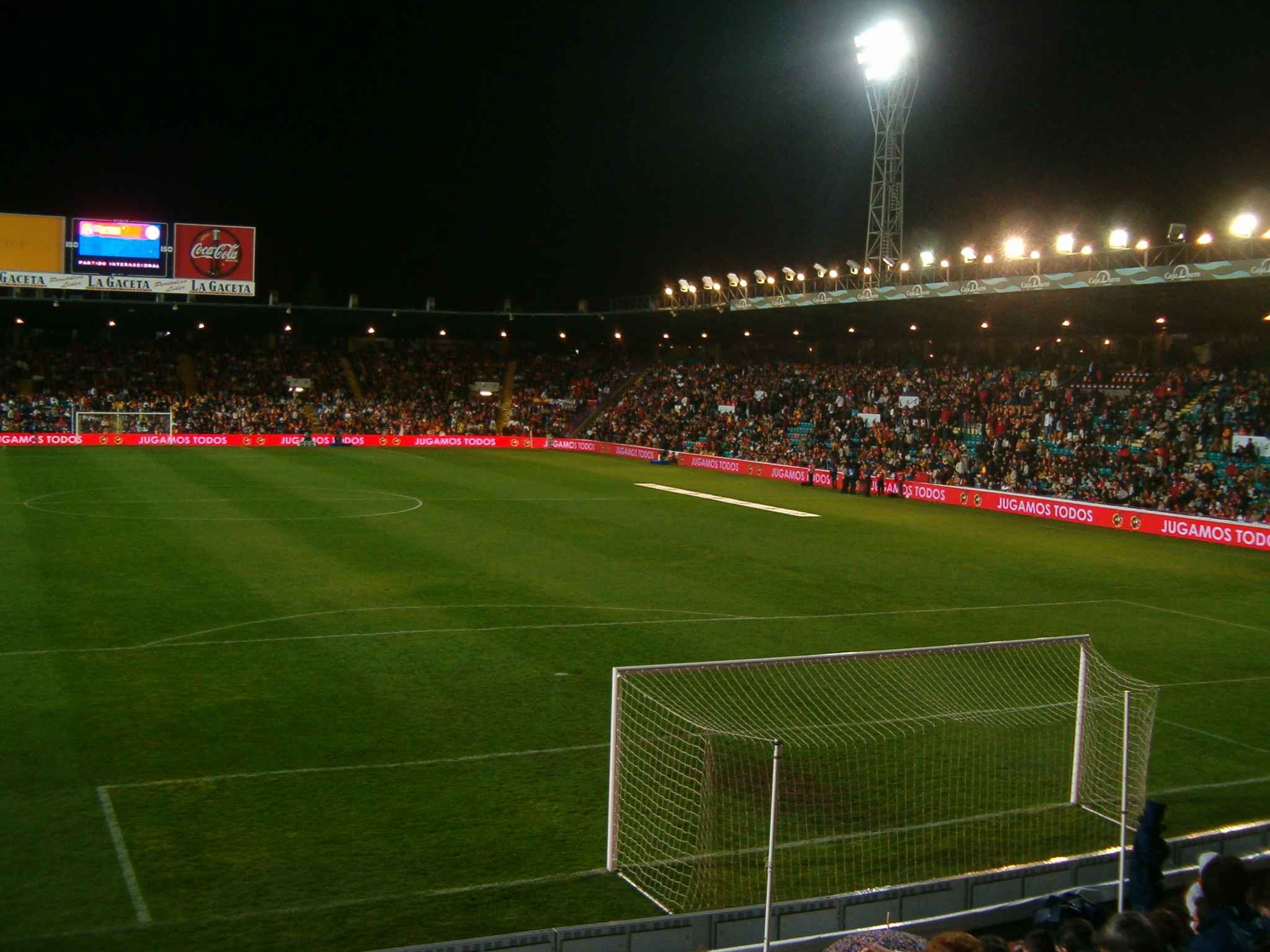
Helmántico Stadium

From 1923 onward, "Los Charros", formally the Union Deportiva Salamanca, were the Salamanca football team. In 2013, the club went bankrupt and its activities were abandoned. After its dissolution, some managers of the entity decided to refound the farm team to continue competing, maintaining the legacy of the historic club. Thus they created the Club de Fútbol Salmantino.

The first high jump over 8 feet (2.44 m) was made in Salamanca, by Javier Sotomayor in 1993. His jump, of 2.45 m (8 feet 0.46 inch), is still the world record in the event.

=== Local teams ===
- Salamanca CF, football team
- Unionistas de Salamanca CF, football team
- CB Avenida, basketball team
- Club Natación Acuático Salamanca, swimming team

== Twin towns and sister cities ==
Salamanca is twinned with:

- Coimbra, Portugal; since 1981.
- Würzburg. Germany; since 1981.
- Hefei, China; since 2022.

== Notable people ==
=== Public service ===
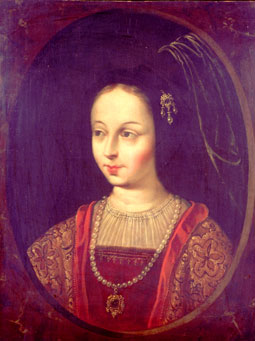
Beatriz Galindo, 15th c.

- Alfonso XI of Castile (1311–1350), King of Castile and León.
- Miguel Ramírez de Salamanca (died 1534), Bishop of Santiago de Cuba, 1530–1534.
- Beatriz Galindo (ca.1465 – 1535), a Spanish Latinist, writer, humanist and teacher
- Francisco de Montejo (ca.1479 – ca.1553), conquistador in Mexico and Central America.
- Francisco Vázquez de Coronado (1510–1554), conquistador in Mexico to Kansas.
- Juan Vázquez de Coronado (1523–1565) conquistador, colonised Costa Rica
- Baldassare de Benavente (1638–1687), a Roman Catholic prelate & Bishop of Potenza
- Jerónimo Bécker (1857–1925) historian, diplomat and journalist.
- José María Lamamié de Clairac y Colina (1887-1956), politician
- José María Gil-Robles (1898–1980), politician
- Antolín de Santiago (1918–?), politician, lawyer, professor, journalist & Mayor of Valladolid, 1971/1974.
- Elena Catena (1920–2012), university professor, philologist, publisher and feminist.
- Francisco Rodríguez Adrados (1922–2020), Hellenist, linguist and translator
- Eleuterio Sánchez (born 1942), former Spanish thief, lawyer and published writer
- Fernando Vérgez Alzaga (born 1945), Secretary General of the Governorate of Vatican City State
- Alfonso Fernández Mañueco (born 1965), politician, Mayor of Salamanca, 2011 to 2018.
- Juan Moreno Yagüe (born 1973), a Spanish lawyer, activist and politician.

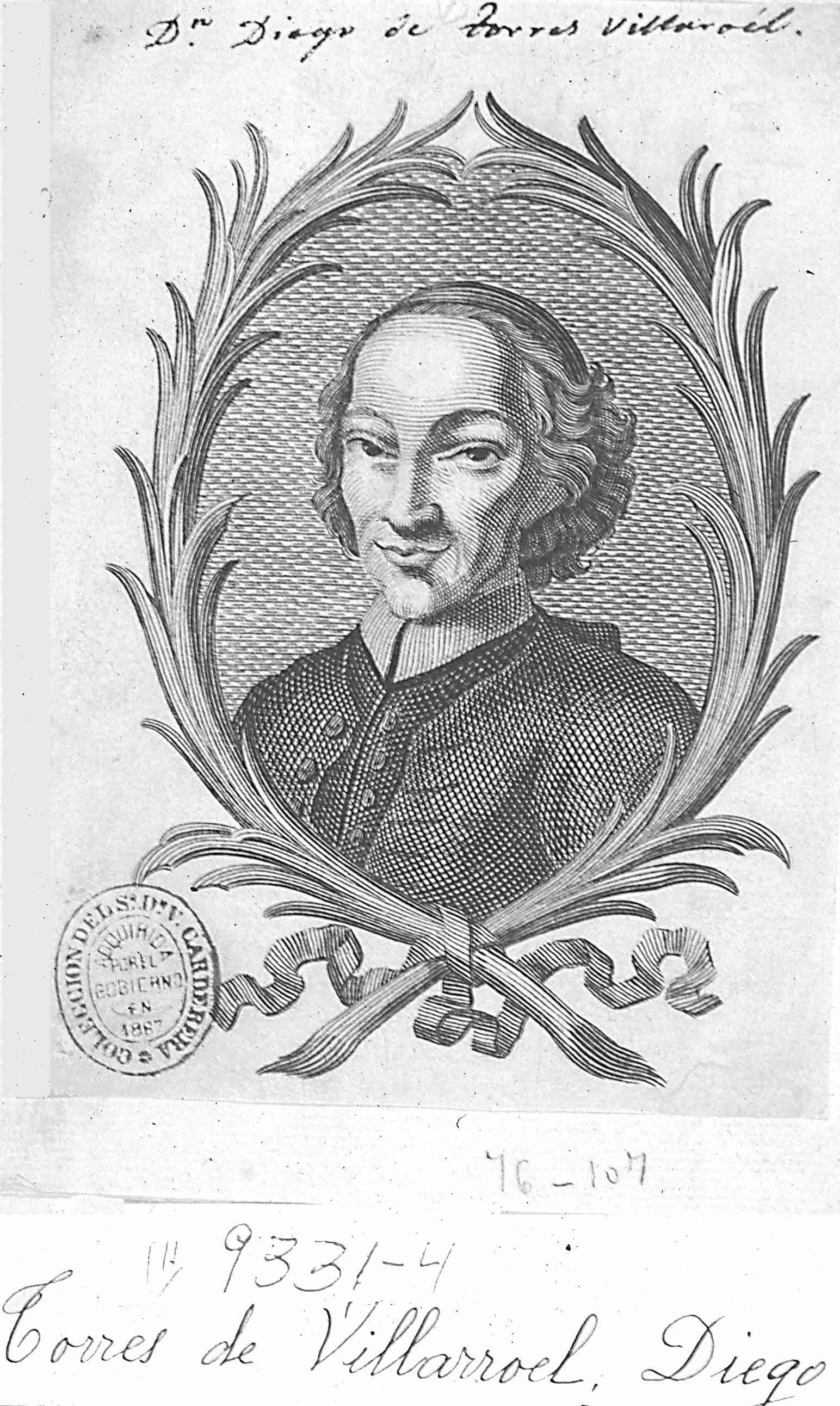
Diego de Torres Villarroel

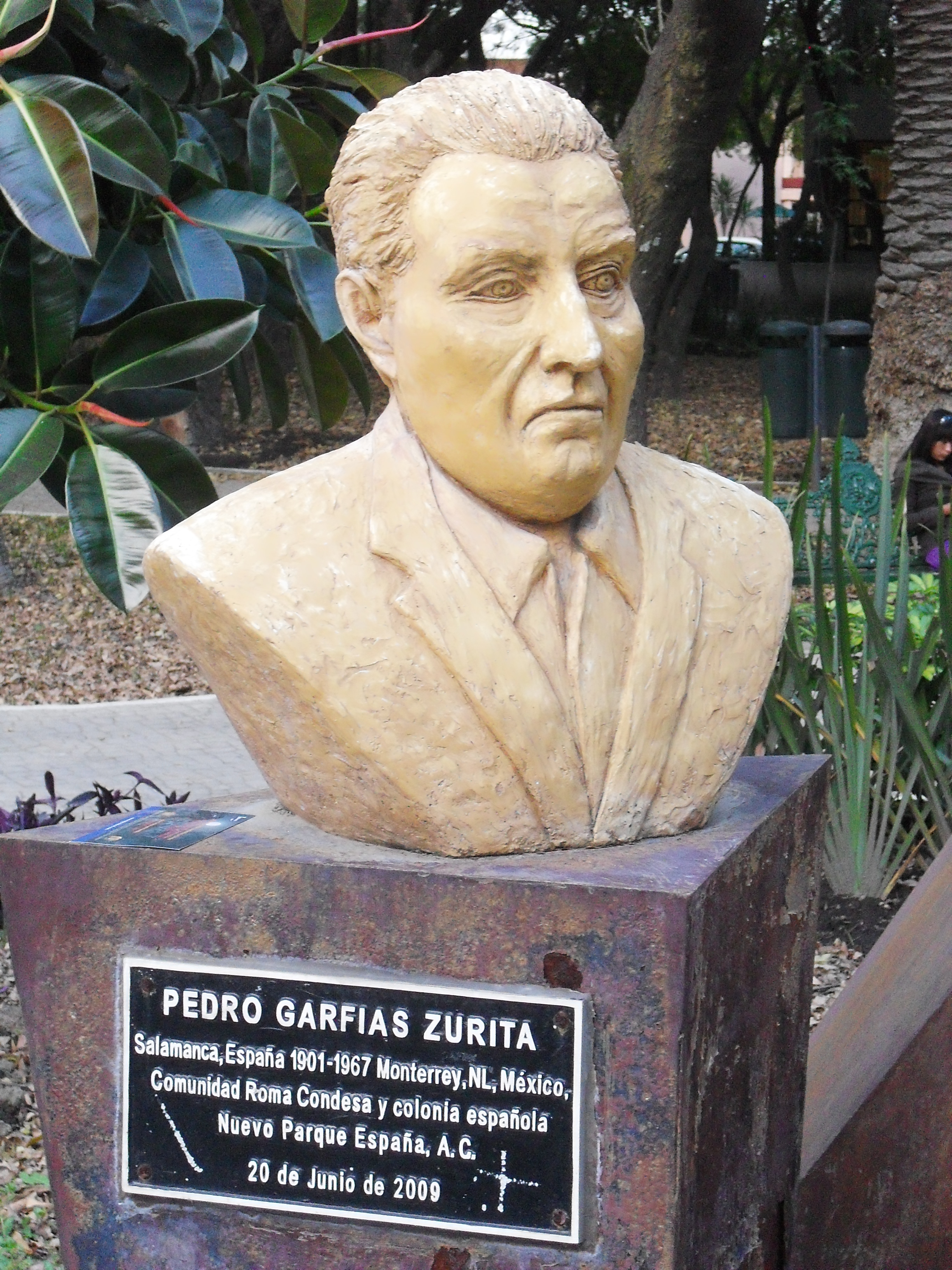
Bust of Pedro Garfias

=== Arts ===
- Fernando Gallego (1440–1507), Spanish painter, Hispano-Flemish in style.
- Lucas Fernández (ca.1474 – 1542), writer, dramatist and musician.
- Pedro Hernández (ca.1585 – 1665), sculptor, drawer and engraver of the Castilian school
- Diego de Torres Villarroel (1693–1770), writer, poet, dramatist, doctor, mathematician, priest and professor of the University of Salamanca.
- Manuel Francisco Álvarez de la Peña (1727–1797), Spanish sculptor.
- Antonio Carnicero (1748–1814), painter of the Neoclassical style.
- Ventura Ruiz Aguilera (1820–1881), a Spanish lyric poet.
- Matilde Cherner (1833–1880), writer and journalist
- Tomás Bretón (1850–1923), conductor and composer.
- Miguel de Unamuno (1864–1936), writer, novelist, poet, playwright, philosopher and academic
- Pedro Garfias (1901–1967), poet.
- María del Rosario López Piñuelas (born 1943), actress, stage name Charo Lopez
- Yann Martel (born 1963), Canadian author of the Man Booker Prize–winning novel Life of Pi.
- Juan Carlos Fernández-Nieto (born 1987), a Spanish-American pianist.

=== Science & business ===
- Abraham Zacuto (1452 – ca.1515), Jewish astronomer, astrologer, mathematician, rabbi and historian
- José Ignacio Sánchez Galán (born 1950), engineer and manager, CEO of Iberdrola
- Mark Russinovich (born 1966) software engineer and author, CTO of Microsoft Azure.
- Susana Marcos Celestino (born 1970), physicist works on human vision and applied optics.
- Flora de Pablo (born 1952), biologist

=== Sports ===
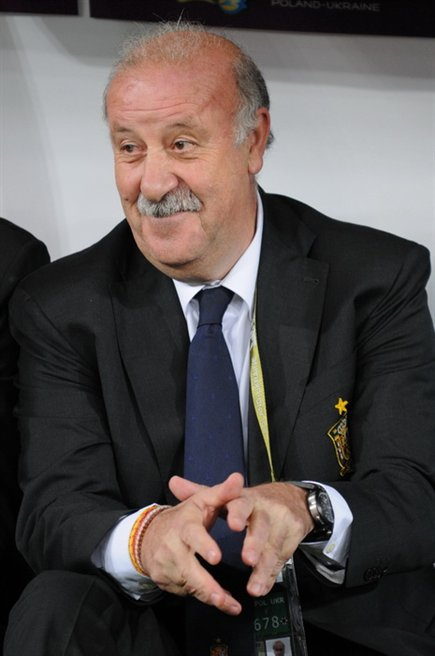
Vicente del Bosque, 2012

- Vicente del Bosque (born 1950), footballer with 518 club caps and 18 for Spain and manager of Spain 2008/2016
- Francisco Javier Sanz Alonso (1952–2022), Spanish Chess Championship winner (1973).
- Teodora Ruano (born 1969) retired female track and road racing cyclist, competed in three Summer Olympics
- Fátima Blázquez (born 1975) road cyclist, competed at the 1996 & 2000 Summer Olympics
- Félix Prieto (born 1975), former footballer with 474 club caps
- Ibán Cuadrado (born 1979), former footballer with 544 club caps
- Jonathan Martín (born 1981), footballer with over 500 club caps
- Óscar González (born 1982), footballer with over 438 club caps
- Daniel Navarro (born 1983), a professional road bicycle racer
- Carlos Peña (born 1983), footballer with 572 club caps
- Álvaro Arbeloa (born 1983), footballer with 344 club caps and 56 for Spain
- Cristina González Ramos (born 1983), a retired handball goalkeeper with 142 caps for Spain
- Javier Carpio (born 1984), footballer with over 440 club caps
- Kike López (born 1988), footballer with over 480 club caps
- David Alcaide (born 1978), professional pool player, European Open Pool Championship winner (2023)

== See also ==
- Salmanticenses and Complutenses
- Monument to Columbus (Salamanca)
