= Antonio de Paz =

Spanish sculptor (c. 16th century–1647)

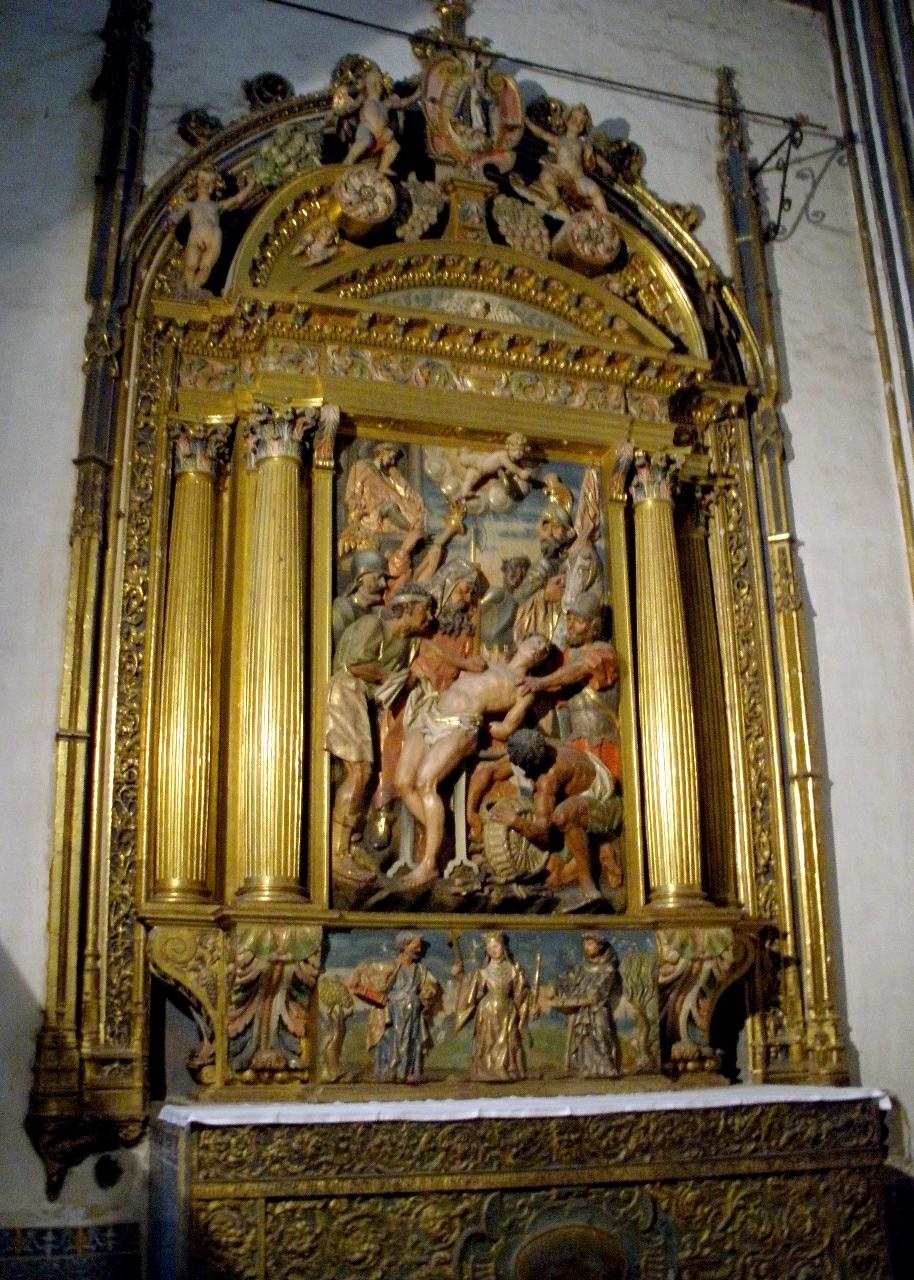
The Martyrdom of St. Lorenzo in the New Cathedral, Salamanca.

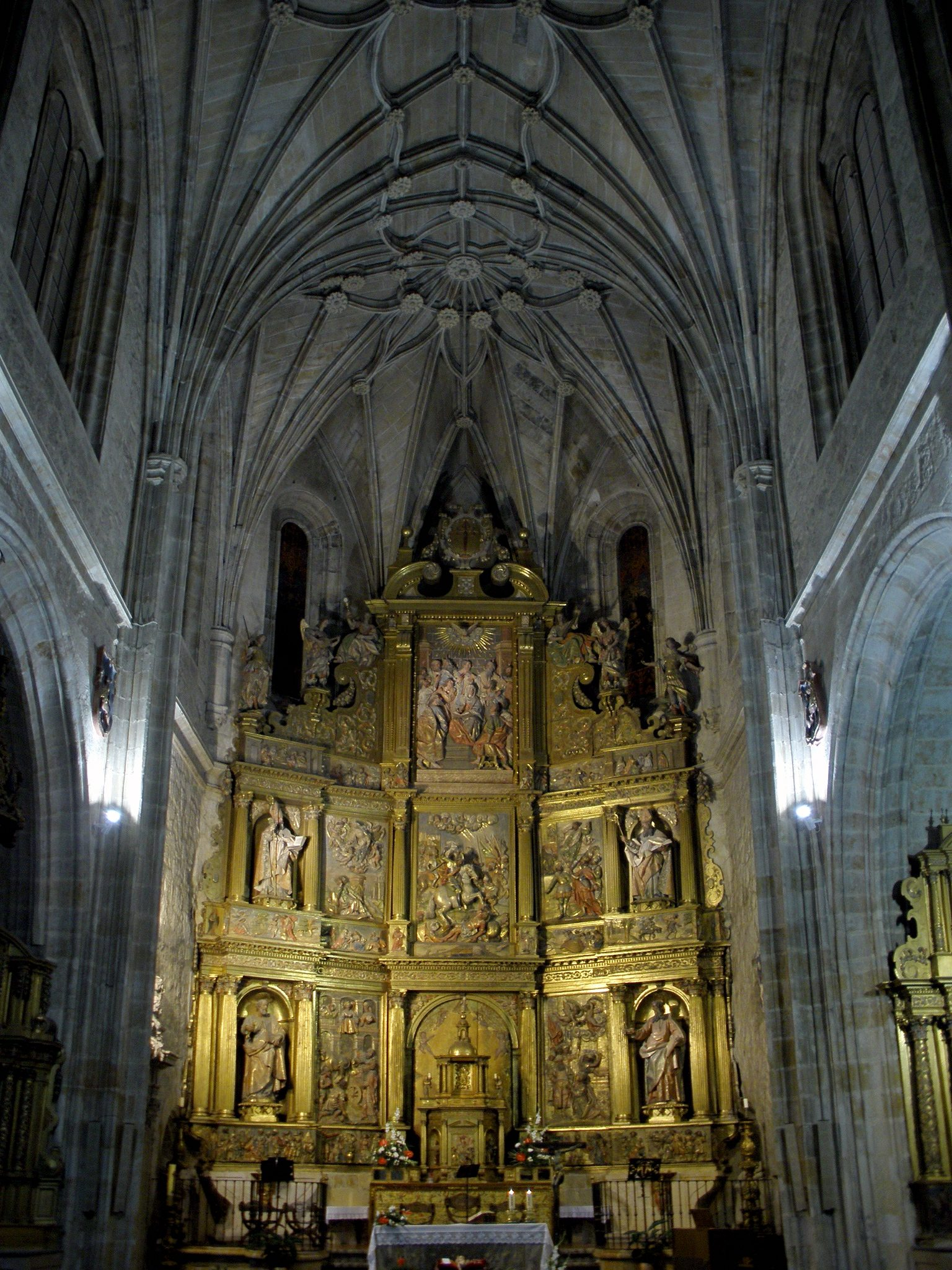
The altarpiece in the Iglesia de Sancti Spiritus, Salamanca.

Antonio de Paz was a sculptor from Salamanca who was born at the end of the 16th century and died in 1647. His work is prominent in Salamanca's churches and cathedral.

== Career ==
In whose workshop Antonio de Paz commenced his training is not known, but at that time sculptors of the Plateresque school were still active in the city, but also that sculptors in Salamanca at the end of the 16th century were being influences by the mannerism of Juan de Juni and Italian Renaissance. These influences, along with those of the Toronese sculptors Esteban de Rueda and Sebastián Ducete, are identifiable in his style.

The earliest known work of Antonio de Paz are two painted tablets in the sacristy of the New Cathedral, dating from 1615. That same year, he created the figures of the two thieves and six angels for the sculpture of the Deposition for the Brotherhood of the True Cross (Spanish: Vera Cruz). In 1617, the monastery commissioned Pedro Hernandez and Antonio de Paz to create a portable Holy Sepulchre, featuring an angel and the three Marys, for the Easter Sunday procession.

In 1621, he was engaged to create carvings and reliefs for the altarpiece of the parish church of St. Martin of Tours, except for the central relief with scene of San Martin sharing his cloak, which was undertaken by Esteban de Rueda. This altarpiece was completed in 1635, but destroyed by fire in 1854.

From 1627, he received a number of commissions for the New Cathedral, stating with images of St. Gregory of Ostia and St. Augustine for the altarpiece of the Chapel of Our Lady of Morales. In 1628 he created the figures of St. James and St. Teresa for the second chapel on the north ("gospel") side of the cathedral, and the principal martyrdom scene in the Chapel of St.Lawrence. The following year he was tasked, along with Francisco Sanchez, with carving the tombs of Antonio Corrionero (Bishop of Salamanca) and his brother Alonso Ruano Corrionero in the Chapel of Our Lady of Truth. He was also responsible for image of the Virgin of the Carmen in the Chapel of Christ of the Battles.

In 1639, he created the image of Saint Teresa in León Cathedral.

For the Convento de San Esteban, he carved all of the sculptures in the sacristy, the image of St. Joseph located on plateresque entrance portal and a statue of St. Peter Martyr.

Antonio de Paz's greatest surviving work is the altarpiece of Church of the Holy Spirit (Iglesia de Sancti Spiritus), Salamanca, commissioned in 1644 and assembled by the sculptors Andres de Paz and Juan de Rojas after his death.
