= José Benito de Churriguera =

Spanish architect

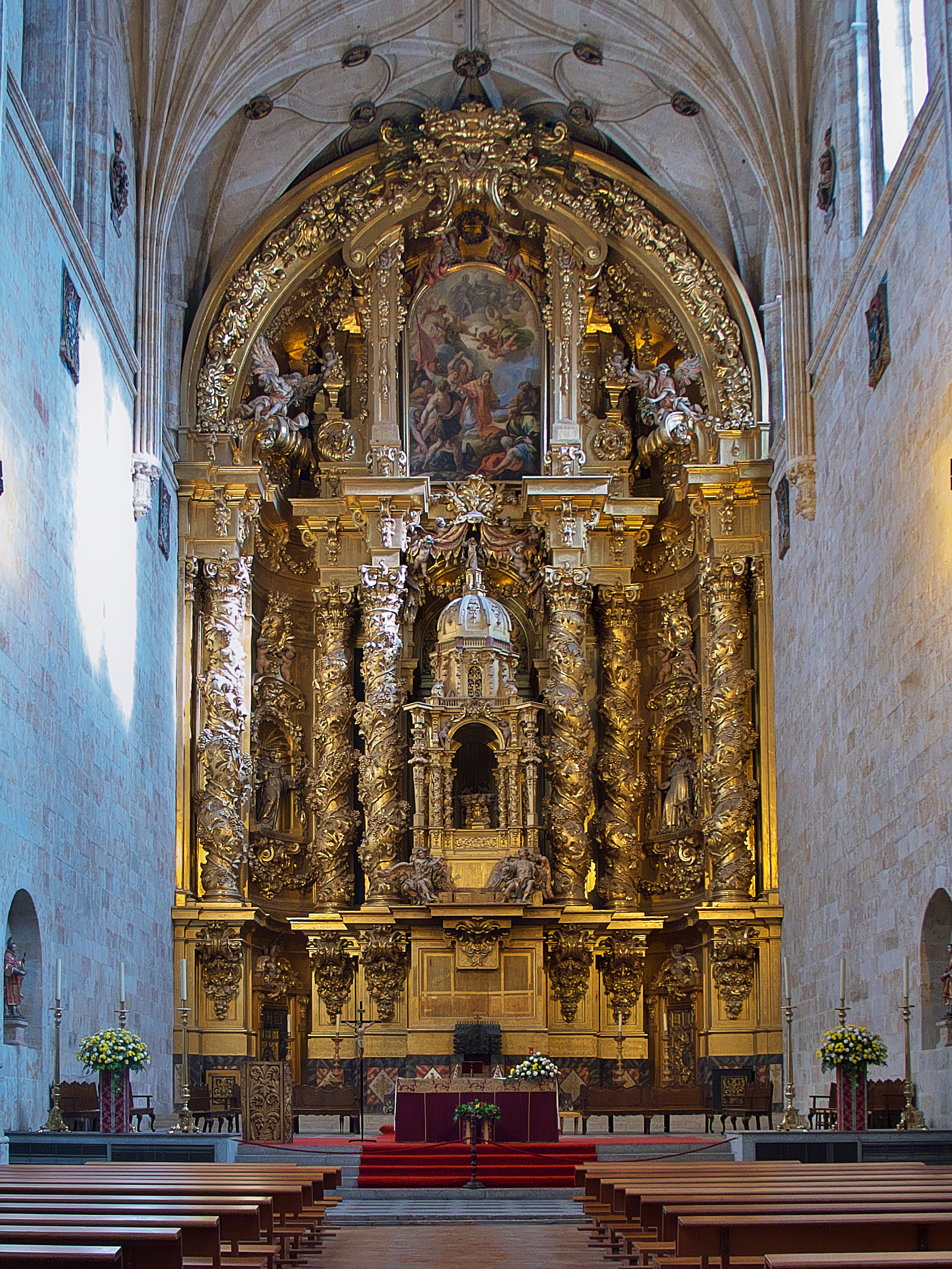
Main altar in church of saint Stephen in Salamanca

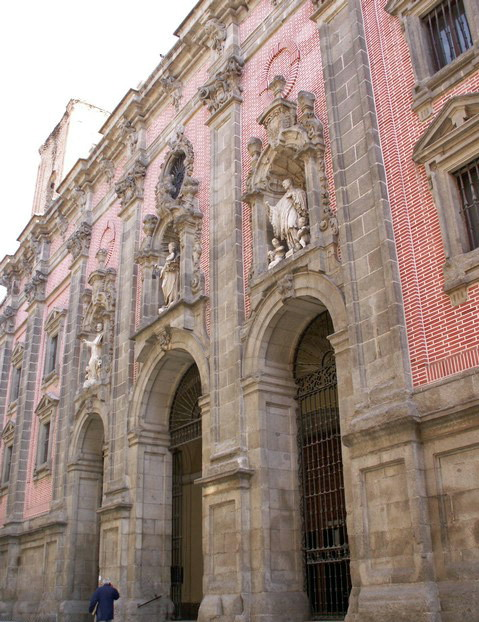
San Cayetano Church, Madrid

José Benito de Churriguera (21 March 1665, in Madrid – 2 March 1725, in Madrid) was a Spanish architect, sculptor and urbanist of the late-Baroque or Rococo style. He was born in Madrid to a Catalan cabinetmaker, gilder and altarpiece joiner, Josep Simó Xoriguera i Elies and to doña Maria de Ocaña, and studied under his father along with two of his brothers.

His excessively decorated style, which can be described as an obsessively over-wrought horror vacui on any surface or facade, led to the adjective churrigueresque. He and his two brothers Joaquín and Alberto were recognized as the leading architects of their time.

== Works ==
His works include or are found in the following:

- The altarpiece in the church for Convent of San Esteban in Salamanca
- In the New Cathedral of Salamanca.
- The church of Saint Sebastian in Madrid
- The church of San Cayetano in Madrid.
- The church of Saint Thomas in Madrid.
- The Goyeneche Palace in Madrid.
- The Goyeneche Palace, church and garden in the factory town of Nuevo Baztán, near Alcalá de Henares.
- The chapel of the Sacristy (Sagrario) in the Cathedral of Segovia.
- The altarpiece of the Transit of the Virgin in the cathedral in Palencia.
