= Joaquín de Churriguera =

Spanish Baroque architect (1674–1724)

- Born: José Joaquín de Churriguera Ocaña; 20 March 1674; Madrid, Spain
- Died: 30 September 1724 (aged 50); Salamanca, Spain
- Occupations: Architect and altarpiece designer
- Relatives: José Benito de Churriguera (brother) Alberto de Churriguera (brother)
- Family: Churriguera

José Joaquín de Churriguera Ocaña (Madrid, March 20, 1674 – Salamanca, September 28, 1724) was a Spanish architect and altarpiece designer. He is generally known as Joaquín de Churriguera.

A member of a dynasty of Baroque architects and altarpiece makers, son of José Simón de Churriguera and María de Ocaña and brother of José Benito de Churriguera and Alberto de Churriguera, he was born in his parents' house on Calle del Oso in Madrid on March 20, 1674. At the age of five, he was orphaned and left in the care of José Ratés, his adoptive grandfather. In 1692, he moved to Salamanca accompanying his brother José Benito, nine years his senior, and established his residence there. He developed his professional activity mainly in the city of Salamanca, although he also worked on significant projects in the provinces of Zamora, León, and Cáceres. At his death, some of his works remained unfinished, such as the Choir of the New Cathedral of Salamanca, which would later be continued by his younger brother, Alberto.

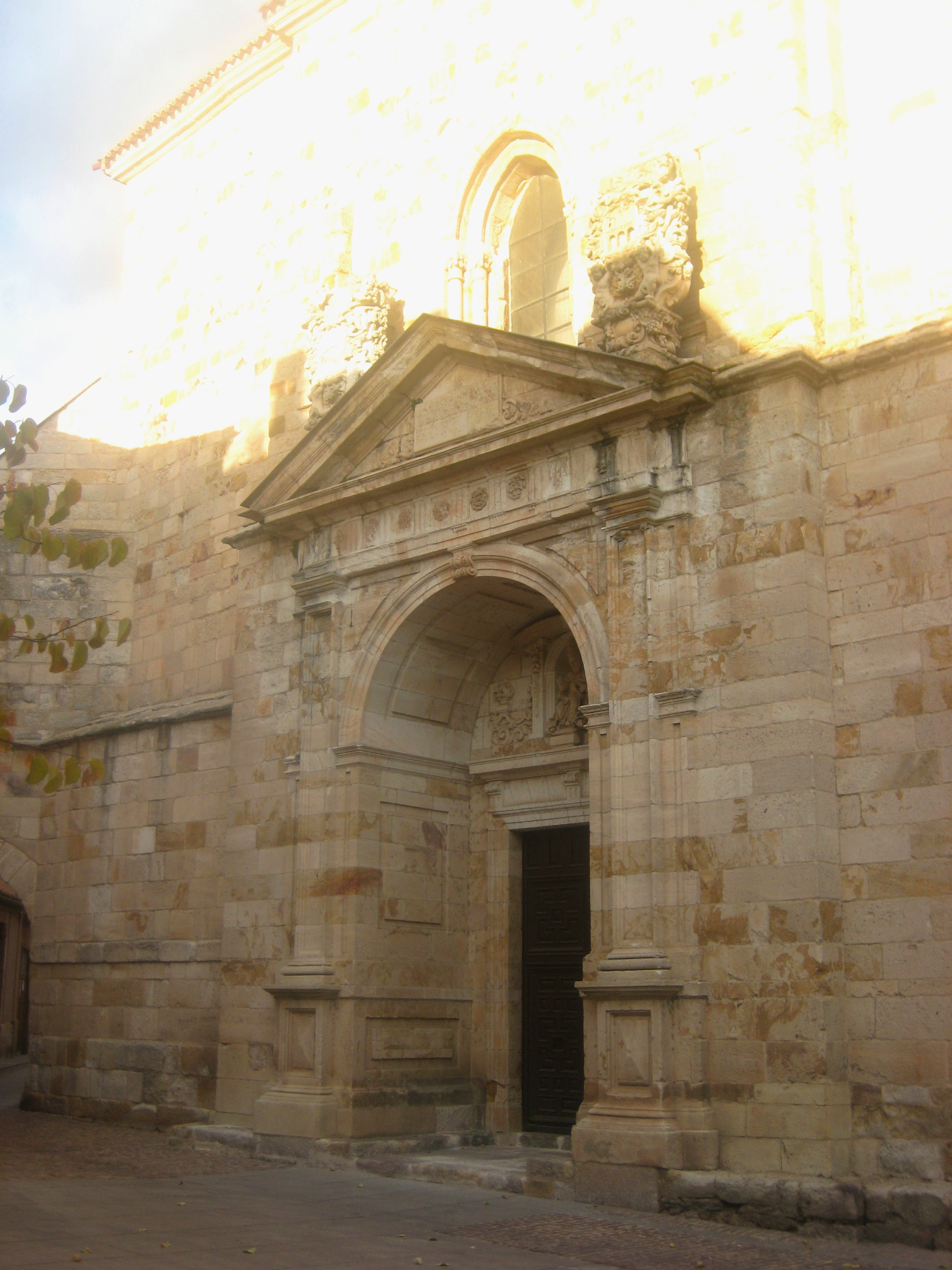
Western façade of the Church of San Pedro and San Ildefonso (Zamora).

== Works ==
Among his most important works is the construction of the great dome of the New Cathedral of Salamanca, begun in 1714, but which today is only partially preserved, as it was ruined by damage caused by the 1755 Lisbon earthquake.

One of his most important and famous works was the Hospice of the Colegio Mayor de San Bartolomé, also in Salamanca. Organized according to the distribution of rooms around a courtyard, its construction recalls Plateresque architecture, relegating the Baroque to the arrangement of certain ornamental elements.

Another important work by this architect is the Colegio de Calatrava in the same city, begun in 1717 again employing Renaissance elements, inspired by the work of Rodrigo Gil de Hontañón. Notable is its noble façade flanked by two slightly projecting towers at the ends, with a front organized through pilasters between which openings decorated with alternating straight and curved pediments are set, enclosed in moldings with ears; resulting in a serene façade that only takes on movement at the doorway through a mixtilinear molding applied to its two bodies, plus a curved pediment that, interrupting the balustrade, creates a frontispiece.

He participated in the work on a Hospice for the Salamanca Council, which at the beginning of the 1 would occupy the Colegio de San Ambrosio and is now the headquarters of the General Archive of the Spanish Civil War.

Joaquín de Churriguera also participated in various other works, such as the closure of the Choir of the New Cathedral of Salamanca, which after his death would be continued by his brother Alberto, the renovation of the Chapel of the Vera Cruz, and the Main Altarpiece of the Convent of Santa Clara in the same city.

For the Church of San Pedro and San Ildefonso in Zamora, he renovated the tower and built its western façade; and for the Cathedral of Plasencia (Cáceres), he participated in the remodeling of the apse and the Altarpiece of the Transit of the Virgin.

== Bibliography ==
- History of Spanish Architecture. Volume IV: Baroque architecture of the 17th and 18th centuries, Bourbon architecture, and neoclassical architecture. Editorial Planeta. 1986.
- Universal Free Encyclopedia in Spanish.
