= Alberto de Churriguera =

Spanish Baroque architect (1676–1750)

Alberto Churriguera
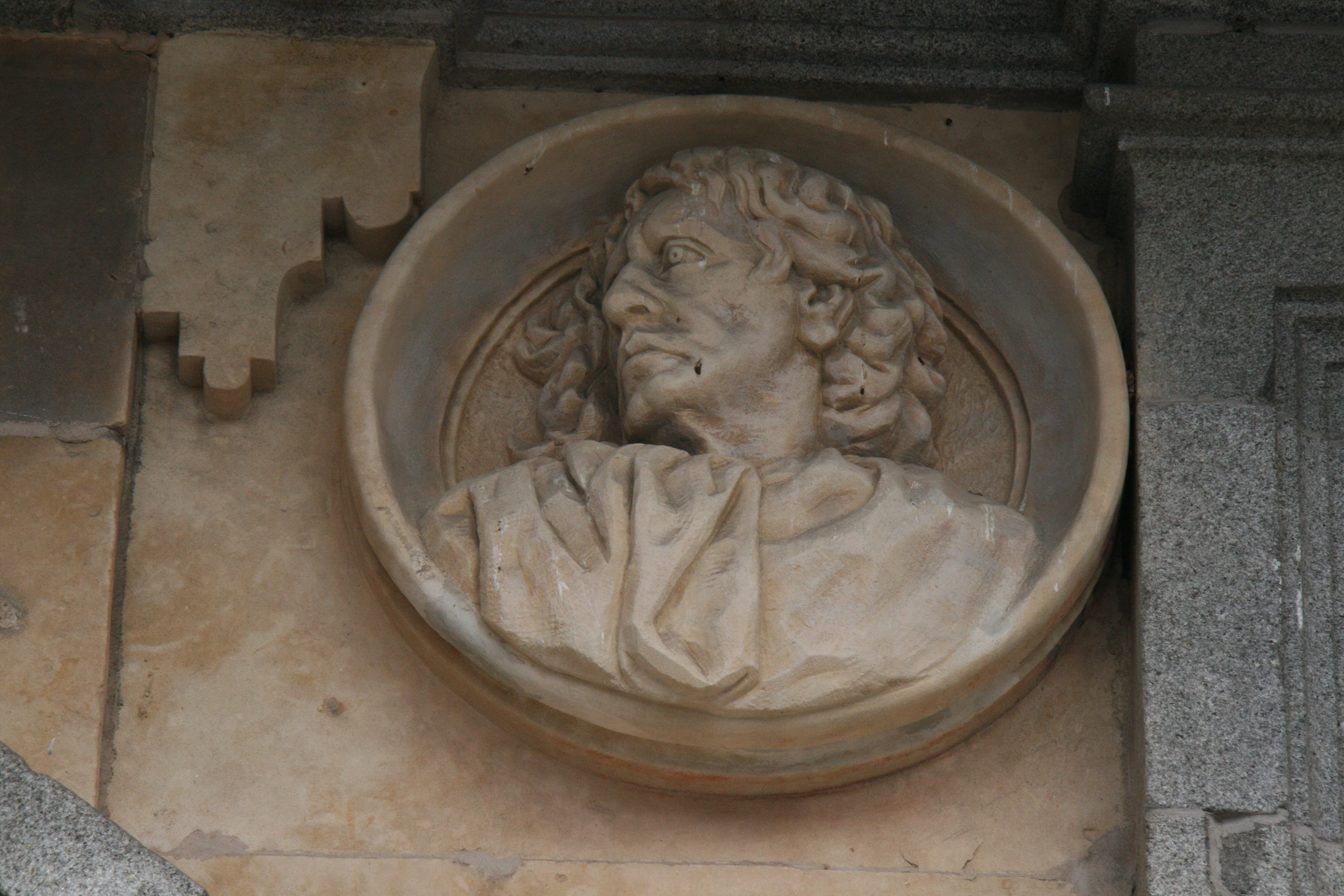
- Medallion of Alberto de Churriguera in the town hall pavilion in Salamanca Square.
- Born: August 7, 1676; Madrid, Spain
- Died: February 27, 1750 (aged 73); Orgaz, Spain
- Occupation: Architect
- Known for: Plaza Mayor, Salamanca

Alberto Churriguera (7 August 1676 – 27 February 1750) was a Spanish Baroque architect, a member of the Churriguera family. He served as master builder of the New Cathedral of Salamanca and began the construction of the Plaza Mayor, Salamanca in 1728. He built two pavilions of the Plaza Mayor, as well as other important works in Madrid and Valladolid.

== Biography ==
He was born on August 7, 1676, in Madrid, on Calle del Oso (Lavapiés neighborhood), son of José Simón de Churriguera, a renowned sculptor and altarpiece maker from Barcelona, and María Ocaña. He was baptized in the parish of Saints Justo and Pastor of Madrid on August 28. His brothers José Benito and Joaquín, both older than him, would also become notable sculptors and architects.

Alberto was orphaned very early, in 1679, when he was about three years old, and learned the craft of architecture with his brother José Benito, helping him in construction work in Nuevo Baztán. In 1692, he accompanied José Benito on his trip to Salamanca to help him build the altarpiece of the church of the Convent of San Esteban. Two years later he was helping José Benito in the works of the College of San Agustín, also in Salamanca. In January 1698, the collaboration between the two brothers was so close that the receipts for their work were signed indistinctly by one or the other. On April 3, 1698, he committed to execute the main altarpiece (and a frame for the altar frontal) of the hermitage of Nuestra Señora de Gracia in Pedrosillo el Ralo, a town located about 14 kilometers from Salamanca, a city in which he was then residing.

On December 13, 1723, lightning struck the bell tower of the Cathedral of Oviedo and its chapter commissioned him along with other architects to review the work. He collaborated on the altarpiece of the Assumption or Transit of Our Lady (1724–1726), in the Cathedral of Plasencia. The Colegio de Calatrava in Salamanca, begun by his brother Joaquín, passed in 1725 to Alberto and the architect Pedro de Gamboa.

In Valladolid, he built the upper body of the facade of the cathedral, a work in which his nephew Manuel de Lara Churriguera assisted. Another of his Valladolid works is the church of Nuestra Señora de la Asunción in Rueda. He also carried out some works in Madrid.

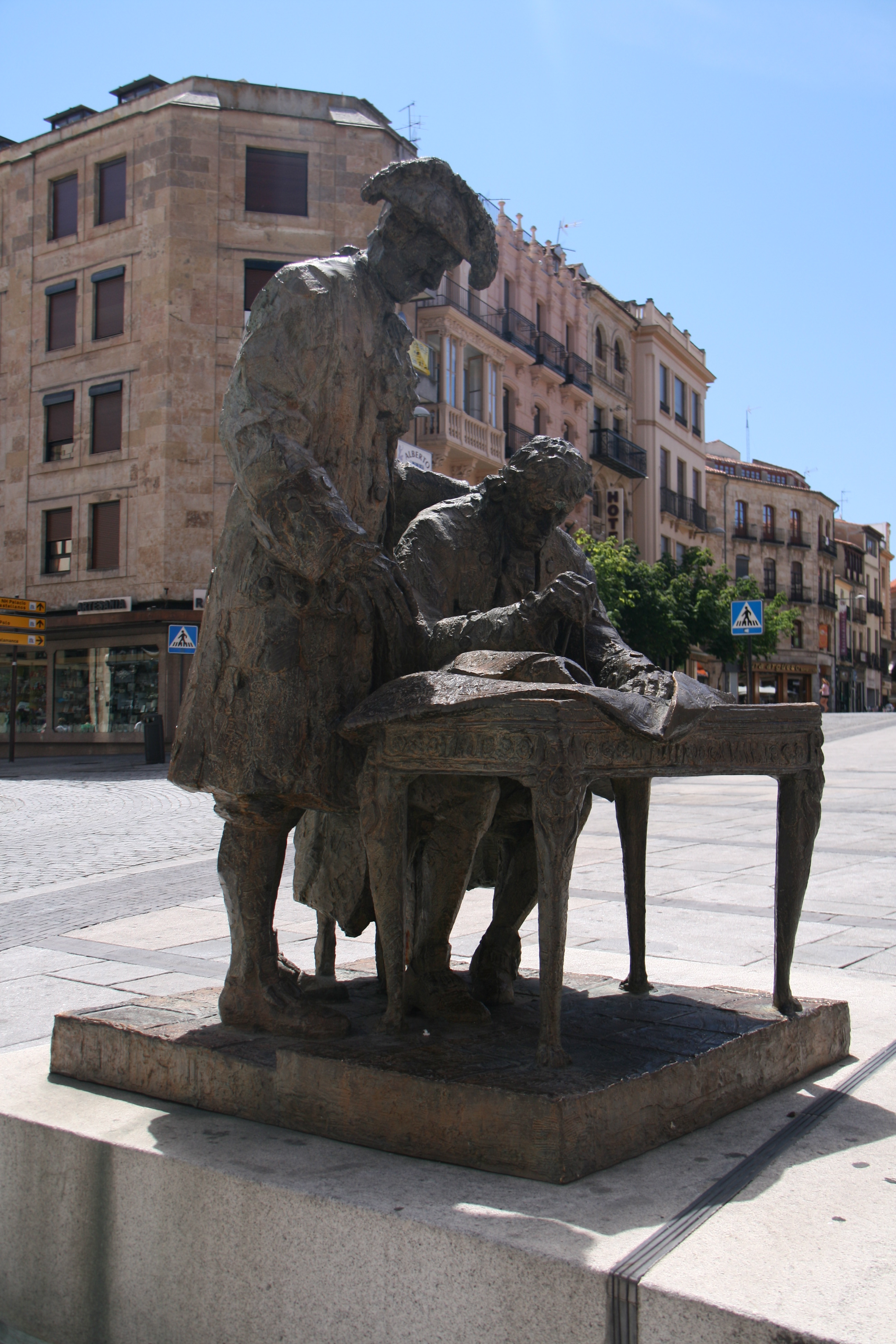
Monument to Alberto Churriguera, work of Fernando Mayoral, in Salamanca.

Alberto was with his brother José Benito in Madrid when in September 1724 his brother Joaquín died in Salamanca, who at that time was in charge of the works at the Cathedral. Alberto then returned to Salamanca and there, on March 9, 1725, he was officially elected master builder and completed the works of the New Cathedral and the Colegio Mayor de Cuenca.

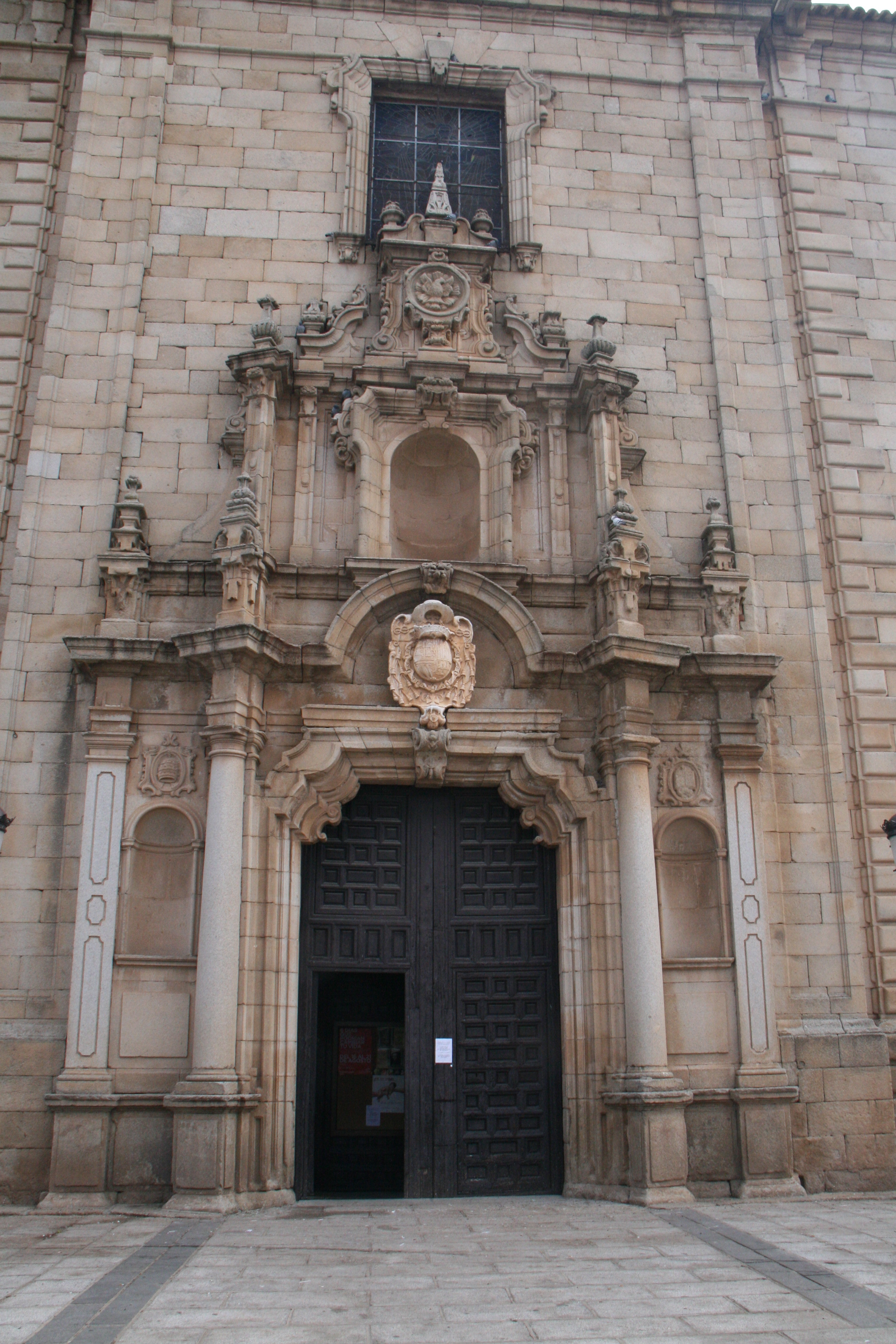
View of the main entrance of the church of Santo Tomás Apóstol (1738–1763) in Orgaz.

His first independent work as an architect was the commission from the City Council of Salamanca as master builder in the design and construction of the Plaza Mayor of Salamanca, occupying part of the surface of the former Plaza de San Martín, between 1725 and 1733.

In October 1738 he left Salamanca and began directing the works of the church of Santo Tomás Apóstol in the town of Orgaz (Toledo). In January 1744 he married for the second time by proxy to Josefa Nieto Fernández, a native of Orgaz. On February 25, 1746, his son José Cesáreo Alberto de Churriguera y Nieto was born, and a year later, on March 26, his daughter María Josefa Churriguera y Nieto was born. He died in Orgaz, without managing to complete the construction of the church. He was buried in the crypt of the then-unfinished church. Its construction, interrupted numerous times, was completed in 1763.

== See also ==
- Plaza Mayor, Salamanca
- Alejandro Carnicero
- José del Olmo
