= Sebastián Ducete =

Spanish sculptor

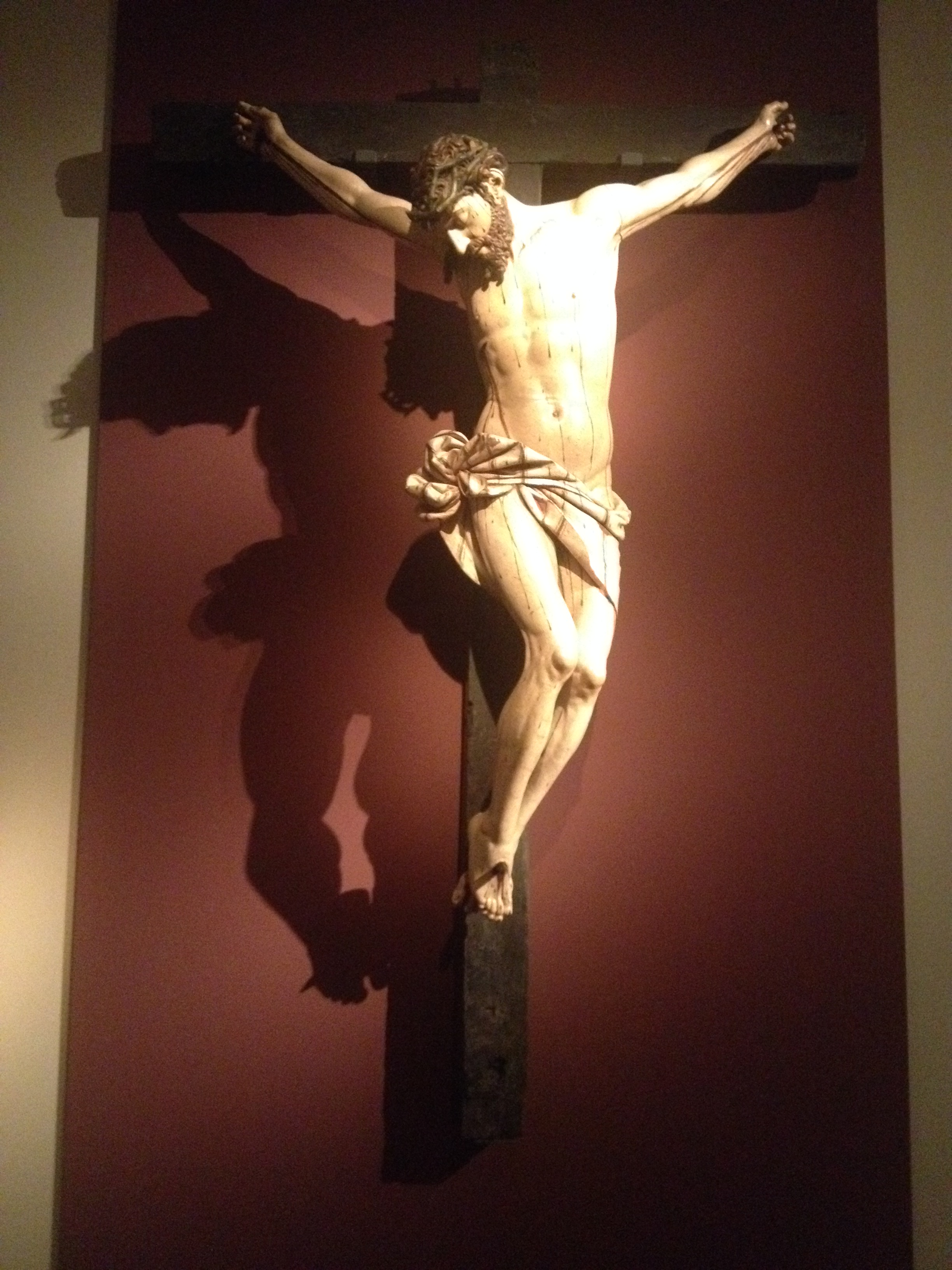
Sebastián Ducete (attributed): Christ on the Cross, early 17th century, polychrome wood carving in the Museu Frederic Marès, Barcelona

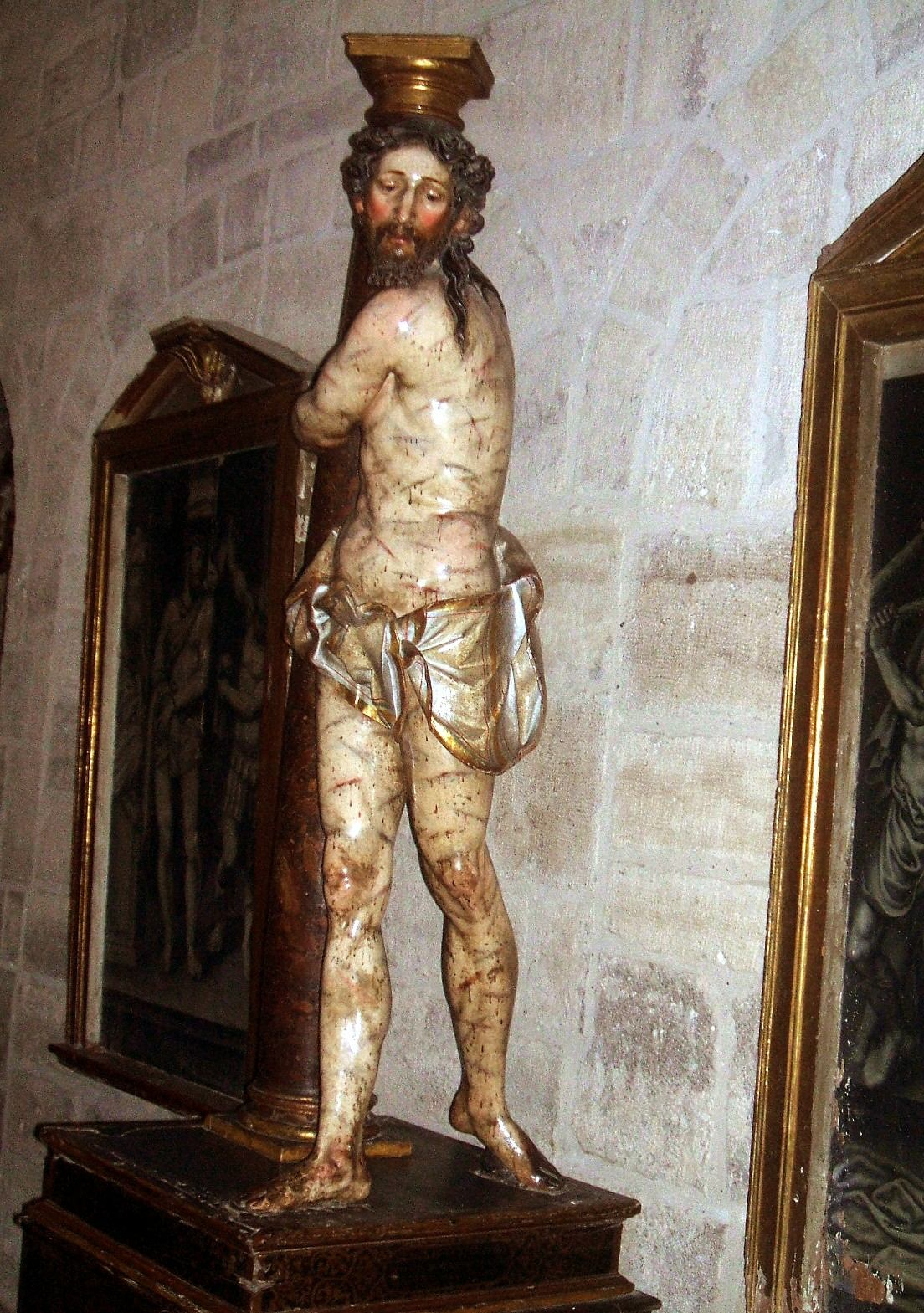
Sebastián Ducete: Christ at the Column, early 17th century in the church San Gil Abad, Burgos

Sebastián Ducete (or de Ucete; 1568–between 1619 and 1621) was a Spanish sculptor. He was born to the sculptor Pedro Ducete Díez in Toro, Zamora in whose workshop Sebastián collected first experiences. From 1591 on he was trained by the sculptor Juan Sanz de Torrecilla from Palencia. From 1595 to 1598 he worked in one workshop with his uncle Juan Ducete the Younger.

1598 Esteban de Rueda entered Ducete's workshop as an apprentice. From 1612 to Ducete's death he was his partner. The workshop of these two is known as Toro workshop. In 1611 Ducete was in Valladolid.

It is difficult to differentiate between Ducete and Rueda since both were influenced by Juan de Juni and Gregorio Fernández though the influence of Juni on Ducete was stronger, his style is more expressive, dynamic and mannerist. One of the workshop's main works is the main retable in the Iglesia de San Miguel Arcángel in Peñaranda de Bracamonte, Salamanca. Ducete and Rueda signed the contract for the work on 11 June 1618. It is disputed if Ducete still worked on the retable. Van Hess claims that Ducete died in 1619 before working began. In 1971 a fire in the church destroyed the retable apart from two figures. Ducete died in Toro.

== Works ==
- Crucifixion and a statue of the Virgin (1592), San Martín, Pinilla de Toro
- Retable (1602), San Sepulcro, Toro
- Sculptures of the retable, church of the Monasterio de Santa Sofía, Toro
- Retable with the fine relief of the Granting of the chasuble to Saint Ildefonsus (1607), San Pedro, Villalpando. It is influenced by Juni. Rueda worked on the garments which are influenced by Gregorio Fernández.
- Paso processional figure of Christ with articulated arms (1615; untraced), for a Cofradía del Santo Entierro
- Relief Virgin and Child with Saint Anne as part of a retable possibly for the Convento de los Carmelitas Descalzos in Medina del Campo, Santuario Nacional de la Gran Promesa, Valladolid. Ducete's style is influenced by Juni. It contrasts with the predella by Rueda who completed the retable.
- (Attributed) Christ on the Cross (early 17th century), polychrome wood carving, Museu Frederic Marès, Barcelona, MFM 1120
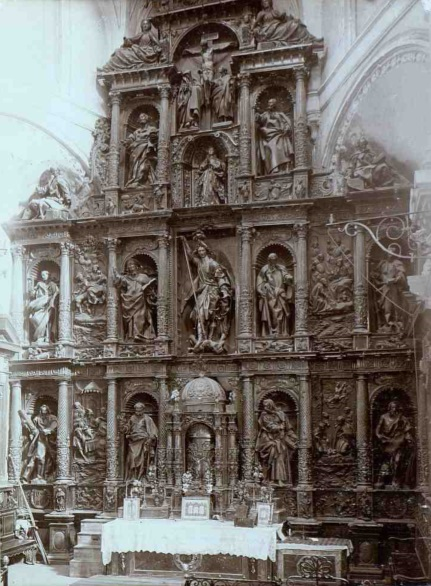
Main retable in the Iglesia de San Miguel Arcángel, Peñaranda de Bracamonte

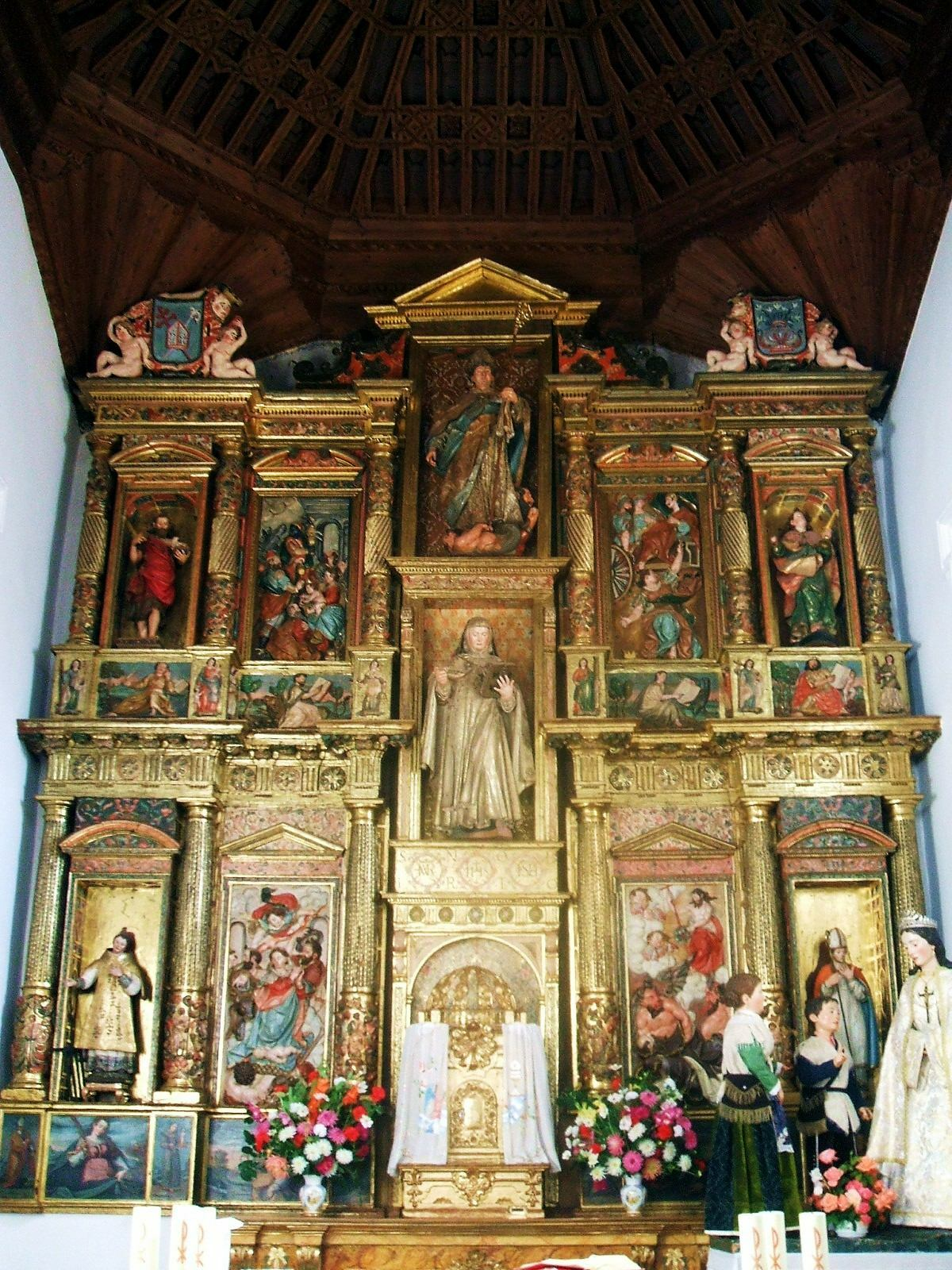
Sculptures of the retable in the church of the Monasterio de Santa Sofía, Toro

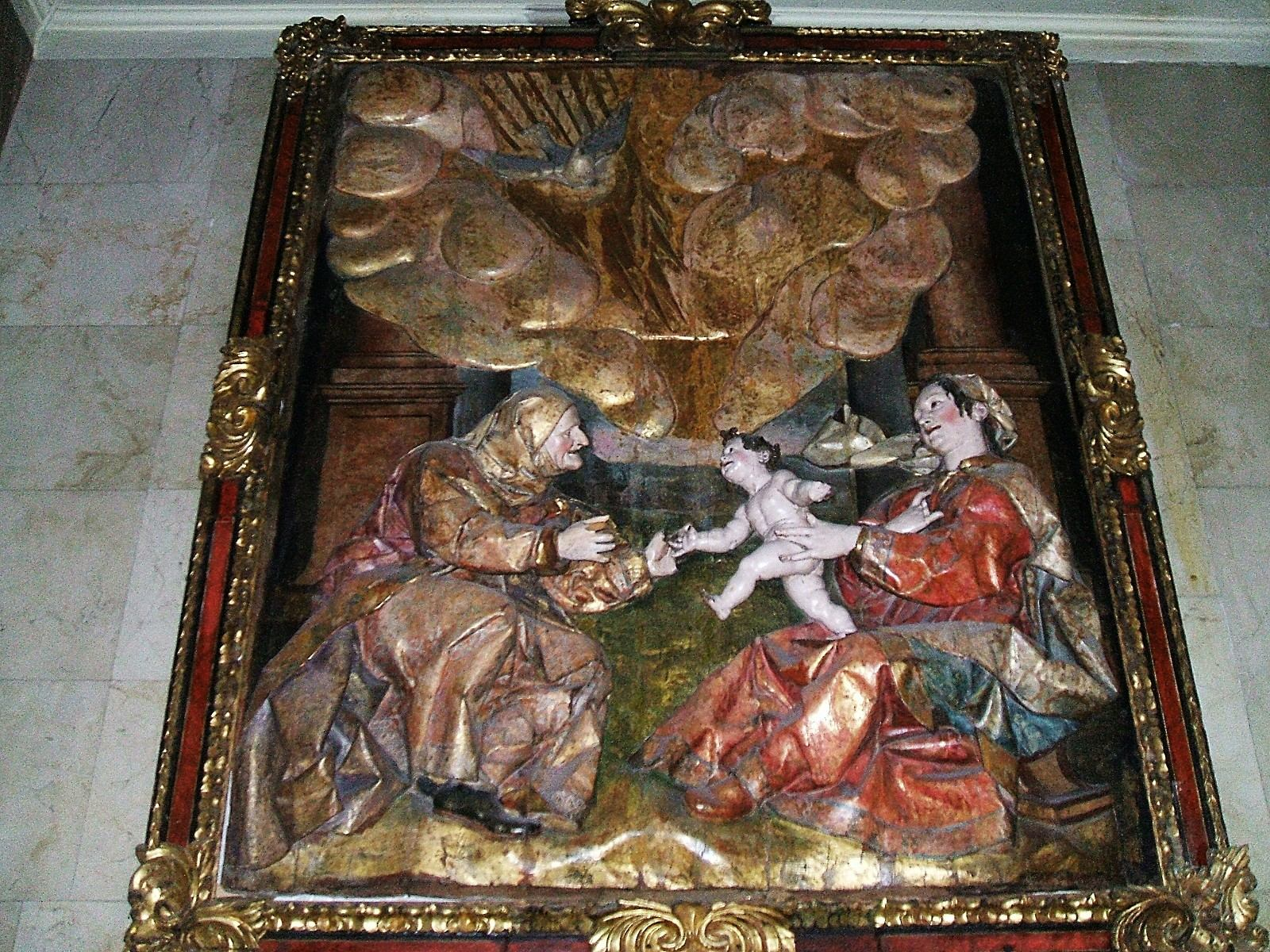
Relief Virgin and Child with Saint Anne, Santuario Nacional de la Gran Promesa, Valladolid
