= Pinilla de Toro =

Coordinates: 41°38′N 5°22′W

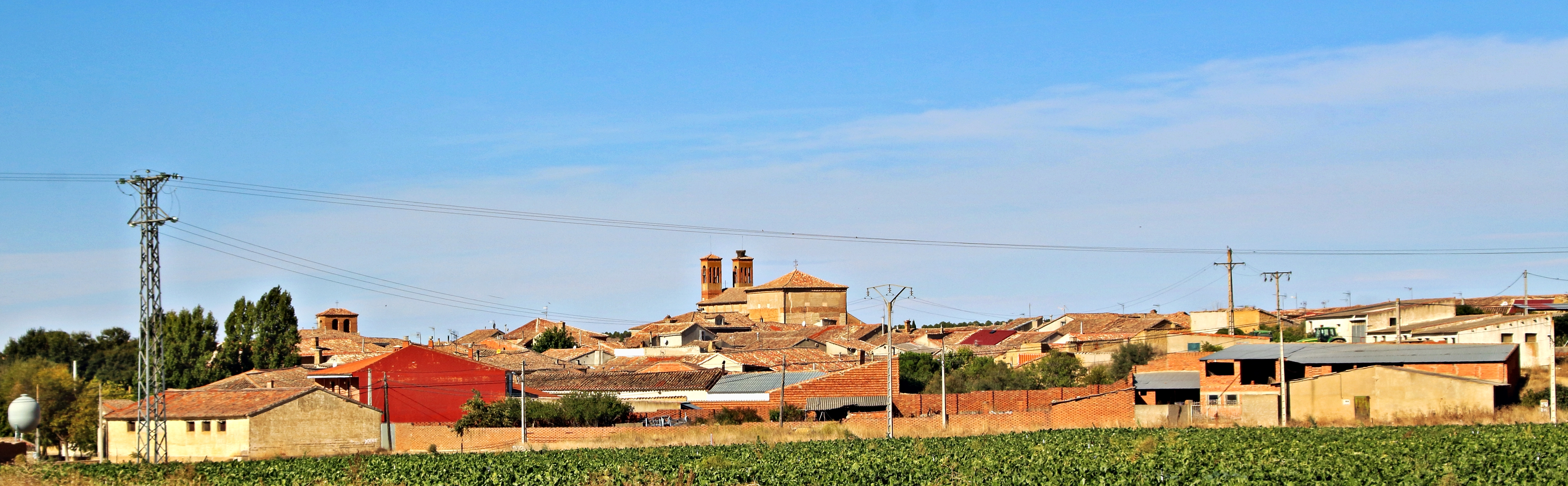
- Interactive map of Pinilla de Toro
- Country: Spain
- Autonomous community: Castile and León
- Province: Zamora
- Municipality: Pinilla de Toro

Area
  - Total: 24 km^{2} (9.3 sq mi)

Population (2025-01-01)
  - Total: 186
  - Density: 7.8/km^{2} (20/sq mi)
- Time zone: UTC+1 (CET)
  - Summer (DST): UTC+2 (CEST)

Pinilla de Toro is a municipality located in the province of Zamora, Castilla y León, Spain. According to the 2004 census (INE), the municipality has a population of 344 inhabitants.
