= New Cathedral of Salamanca =

Cathedral of Salamanca, Spain

Coordinates: 40°57′38″N 5°39′57″W

New Cathedral of Salamanca Catedral Nueva de Salamanca
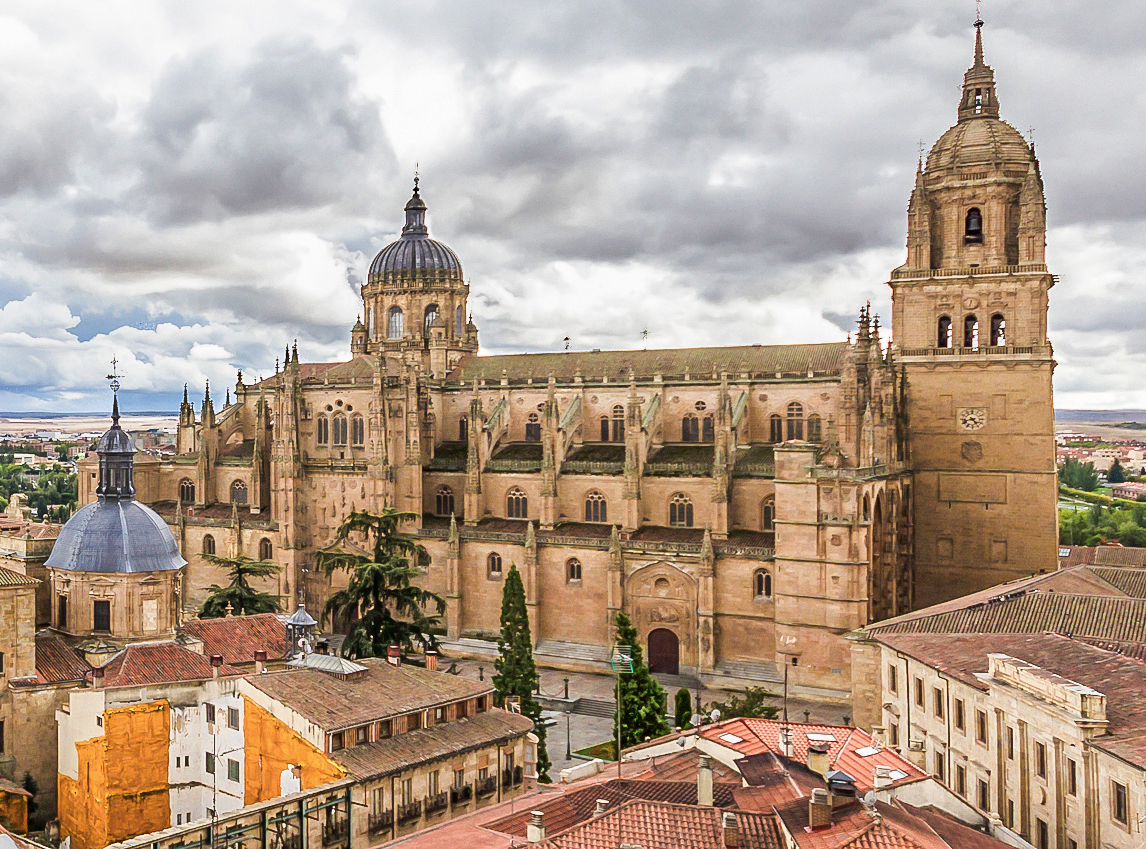
- Tower and dome of the New Cathedral.

Religion
- Affiliation: Catholic Church

Location
- Location: Salamanca, Castile and León, Spain
- Interactive map of New Cathedral of Salamanca; Catedral Nueva de Salamanca

Architecture
- Type: Cathedral church
- Style: Late Gothic, Plateresque, Baroque
- Groundbreaking: 1513
- Completed: 1733

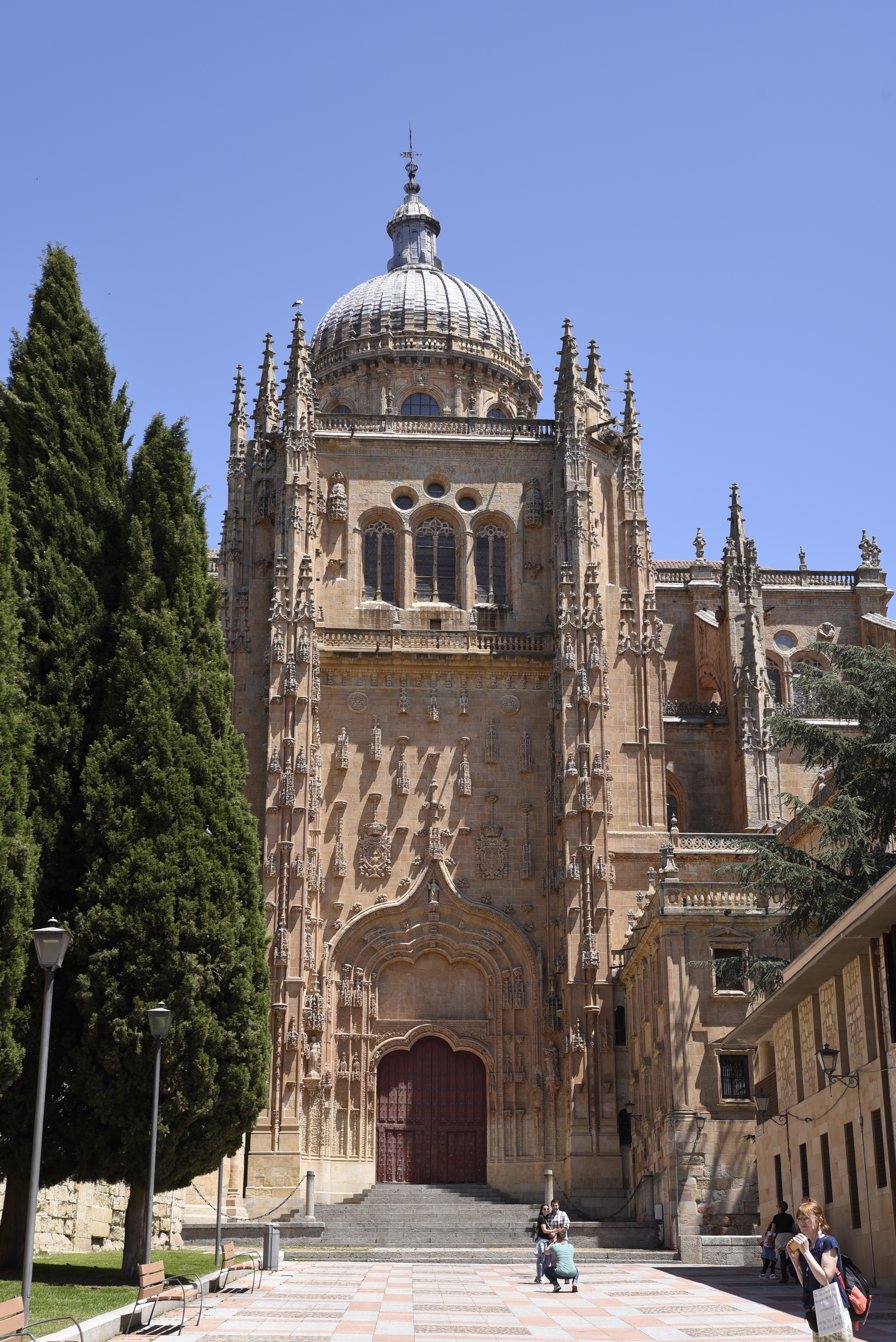
Plateresque South facade

The Catedral de la Asunción de la Virgen (Cathedral of the Assumption of the Virgin Mary), popularly known as New Cathedral (Spanish: Catedral Nueva) is, together with the Old Cathedral, one of the two cathedrals of Salamanca, Castile and León, Spain. It is the seat of the diocese of Salamanca. It was constructed between 1533 and 1733 mixing late Gothic, Plateresque and Baroque styles. It was commissioned by Ferdinand V of Castile. It is one of the largest cathedrals in Spain in size and its bell tower, at 92 meters high, is also one of the tallest.

== History ==
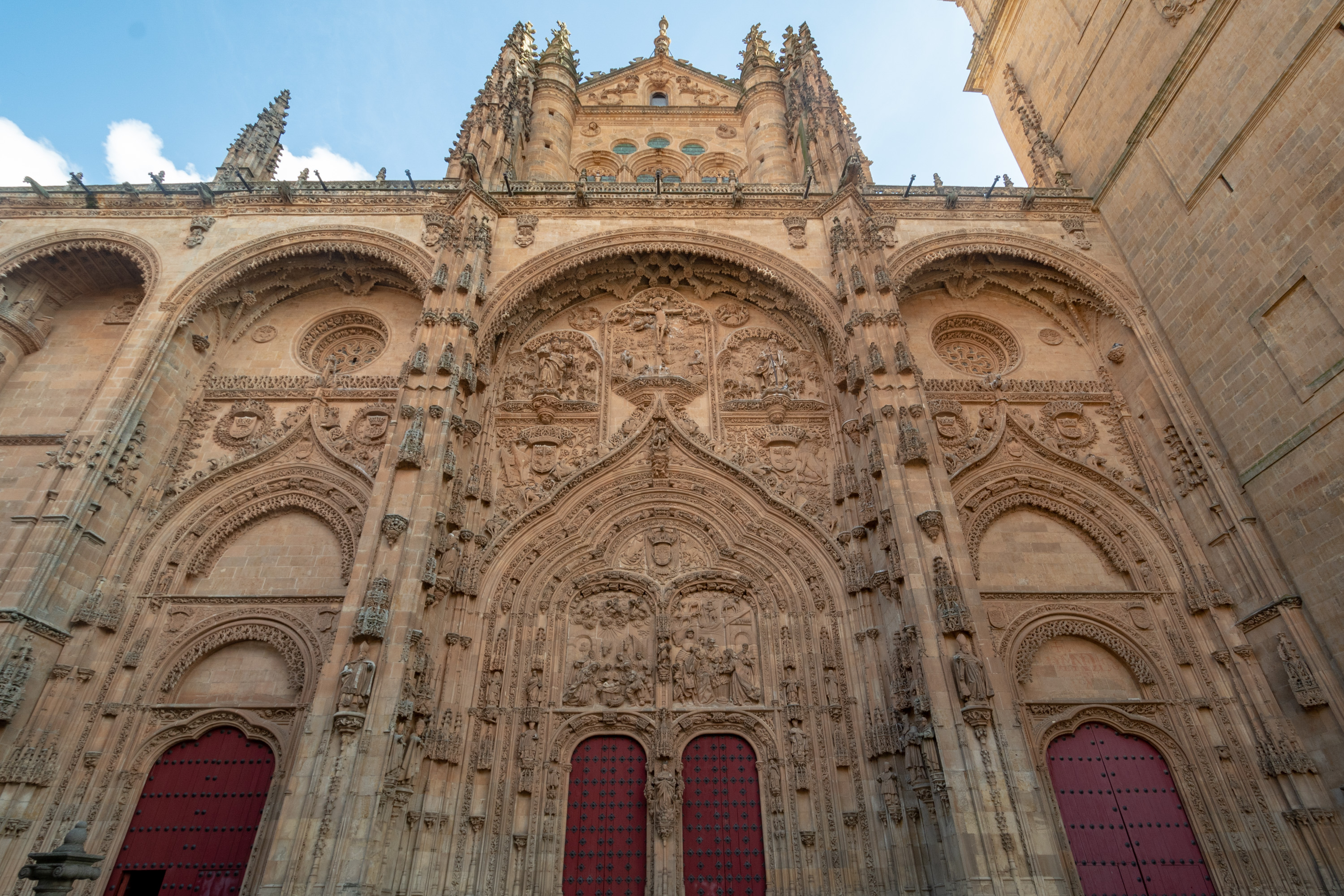
Plateresque Western facade

The New Cathedral was built between 1513 and 1733 preserving the Old Cathedral. At first they thought to demolish it, although the criterion was imposed to keep it open to the faithful while the construction of the new one was carried out. When the works were finished in the 18th century, they reconsidered the idea of destroying it and for that reason it is conserved at the present time. However, the south wall of the New Cathedral rests on the north wall of the Old one, which had to be reinforced towards the interior of the old temple, whose lateral nave was partially reduced with the new construction. The tower of the new cathedral was built over the bell tower of the Old Cathedral.

The idea of building a new cathedral arose in the 15th century due to the demographic increase of the city, especially because of the strong attraction of the University. Therefore, the Old Cathedral seemed at that time "small, dark and low". They had the support of King Ferdinand the Catholic (Ferdinand II of Aragon), who in 1509 ordered the architects who had worked in Toledo and Seville, Antón Egas and Alonso Rodríguez, to go to Salamanca to draw the design of the new temple.

The cathedral, after several discussions, was designed parallel to the old one, made of freestone from Villamayor and in Gothic architecture style. It has a rectangular plan, with three naves and two more niche chapels. In principle, the chevet was to end in an ambulatory and polygonal apses, but finally the project was changed to the current one, which finishes the temple with a rectangular chevet that makes a hall plan. The first stone was laid in 1512, being bishop of Salamanca Francisco de Bobadilla.

During most of the 17th century the works were stopped and were resumed again in the 18th century, until its completion in 1733. The cathedral suffered the devastating effects of the Lisbon earthquake, which occurred on November 1, 1755, leaving visible signs in the cracks and broken stained glass windows. After the earthquake, the dome had to be rebuilt (by Juan de Sagarvinaga) and the bell tower had to be reinforced, which was more slender, very similar to that of the Cathedral of Segovia. The belfry suffered serious damage during the earthquake, even tilting and threatening ruin. After consulting several architects who recommended its demolition, it was finally Baltasar Dreveton who proposed to strap it with 8 taut chains and line it with stone in the form of a slope reaching up to the body of bells (about 40 meters from the ground). The direction of this work was entrusted to Jerónimo García de Quiñones with Manuel de los Ríos. This is how it can be seen today, lined with stones and leaning to one side due to the Lisbon earthquake. Currently this catastrophe is remembered with the tradition of the "Mariquelo" on October 31.

Around 1812 the Napoleonic French army of occupation demolished the block of houses located to the north of the cathedral, creating the current Plaza de Anaya and highlighting the north façade, which was not prepared for exhibition and was not very attractive. This fact has caused that the best known photos of the cathedral are taken from this side, making us forget the main facade, much more interesting but located in a narrow street and without enough width to get good pictures.

It was declared a national monument by royal decree in 1887 and in 1999 Protective Environment.

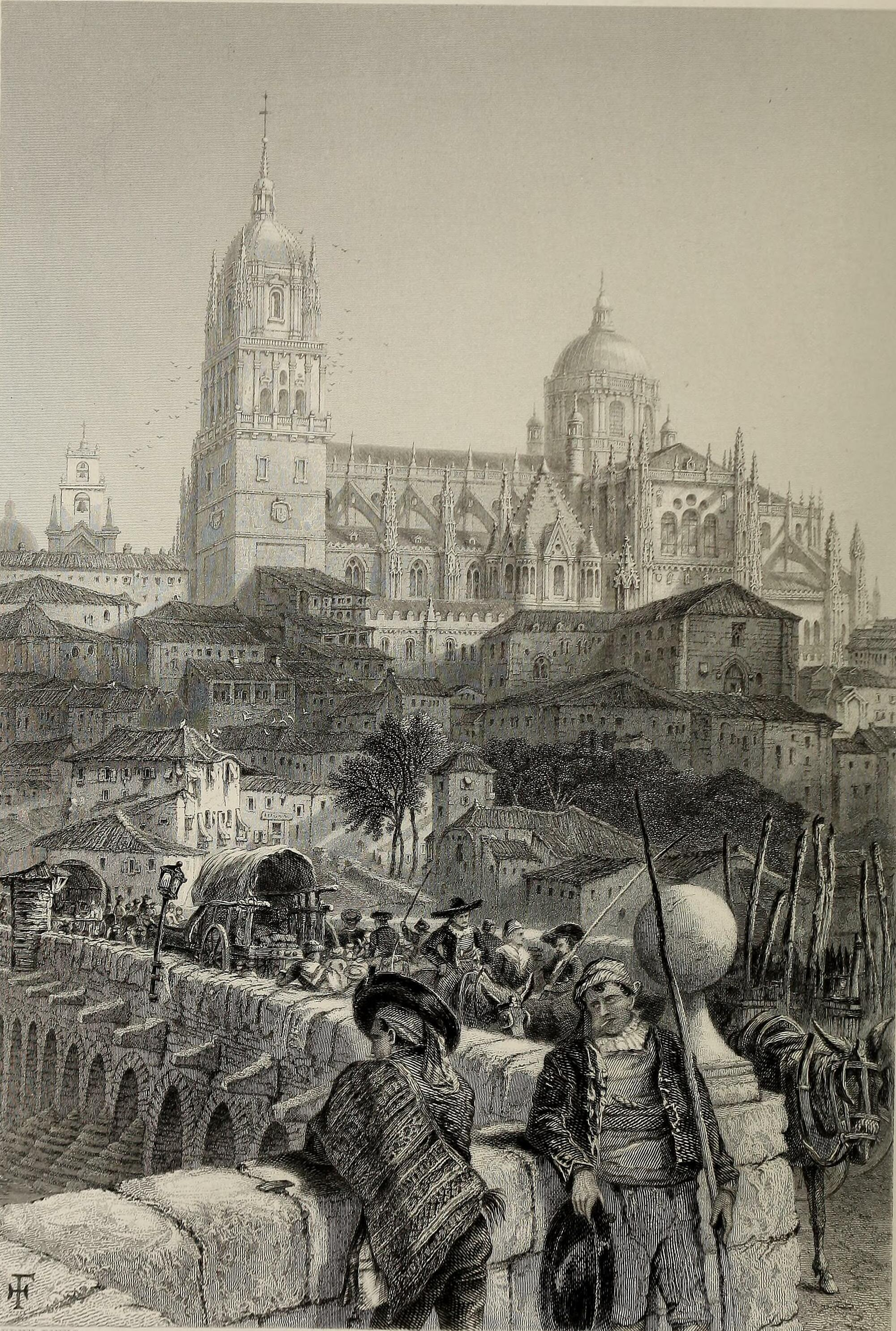
New Cathedral of Salamanca and Roman Bridge in 1878 by Harry Fenn.

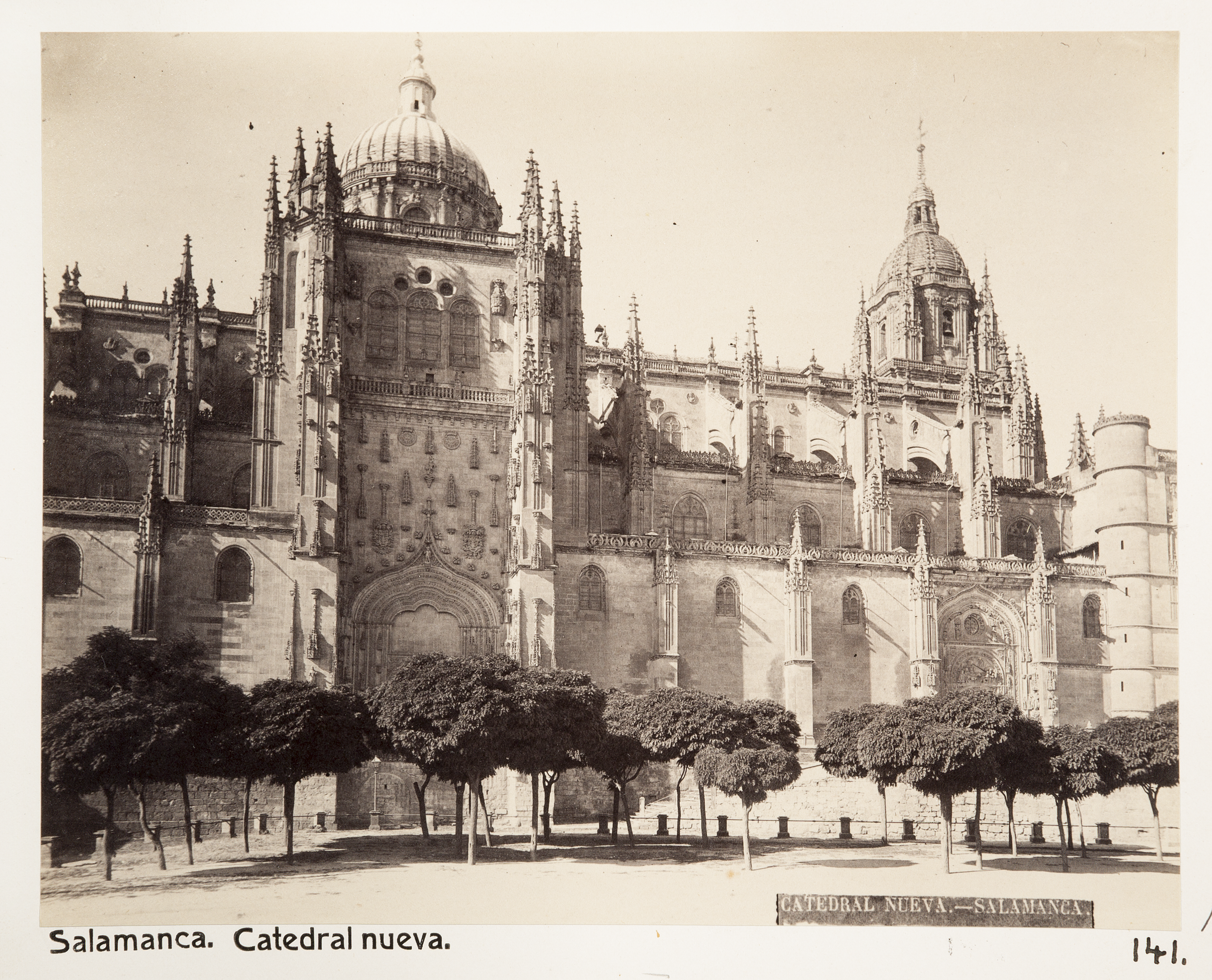
New Cathedral of Salamanca in 1895 by Jenny Bergensten. Hallwyl Museum.

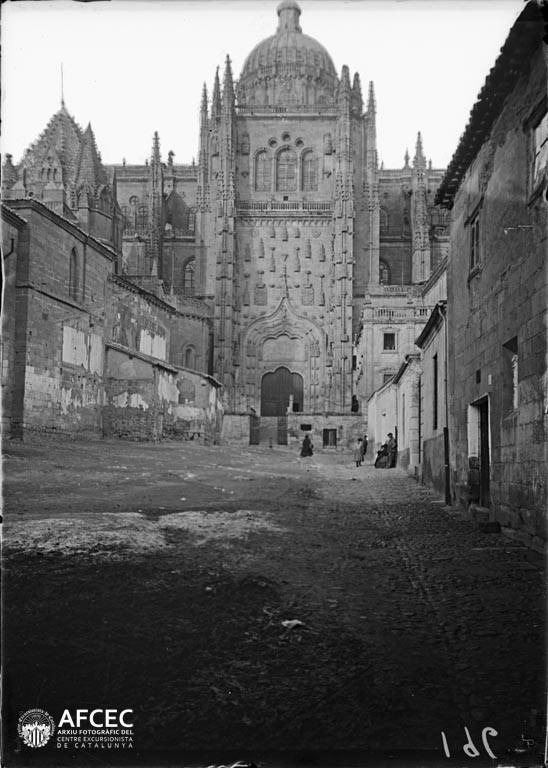
New cathedral of Salamanca between 1880 and 1926. Memòria Digital de Catalunya.

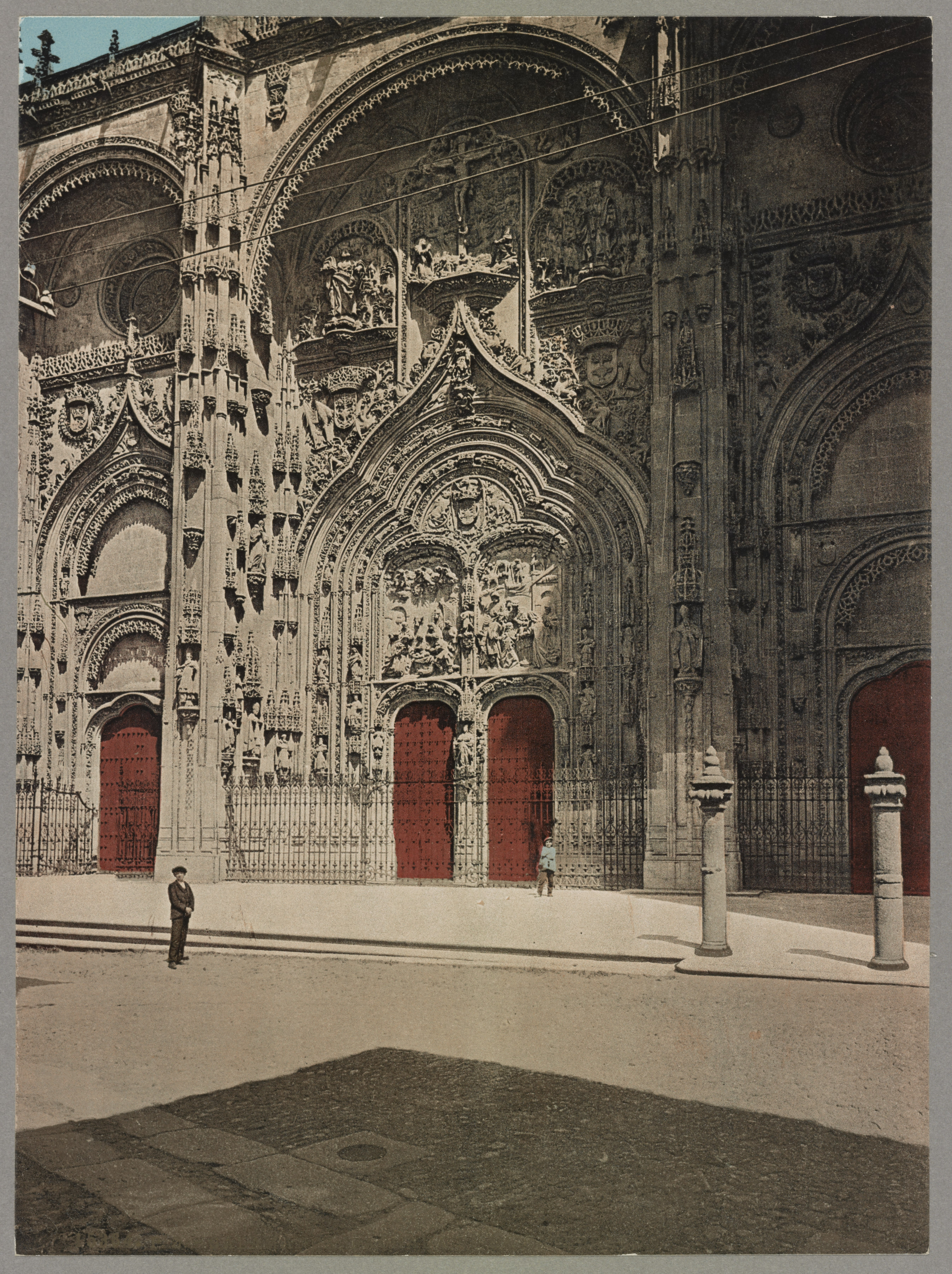
Western facade of the New cathedral of Salamanca, in 1890, color photochrom. Library of Congress.

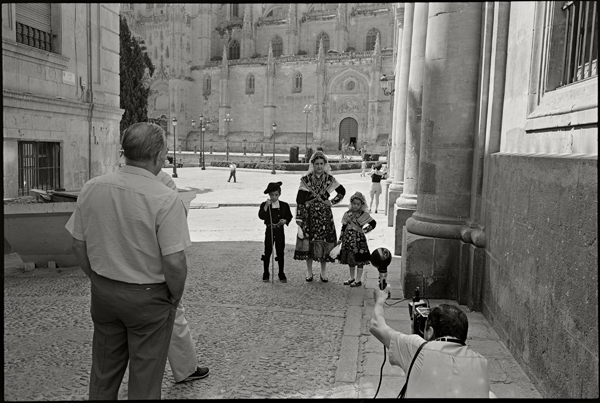
Salamancan family posing at the entrance of the new cathedral in 1984.

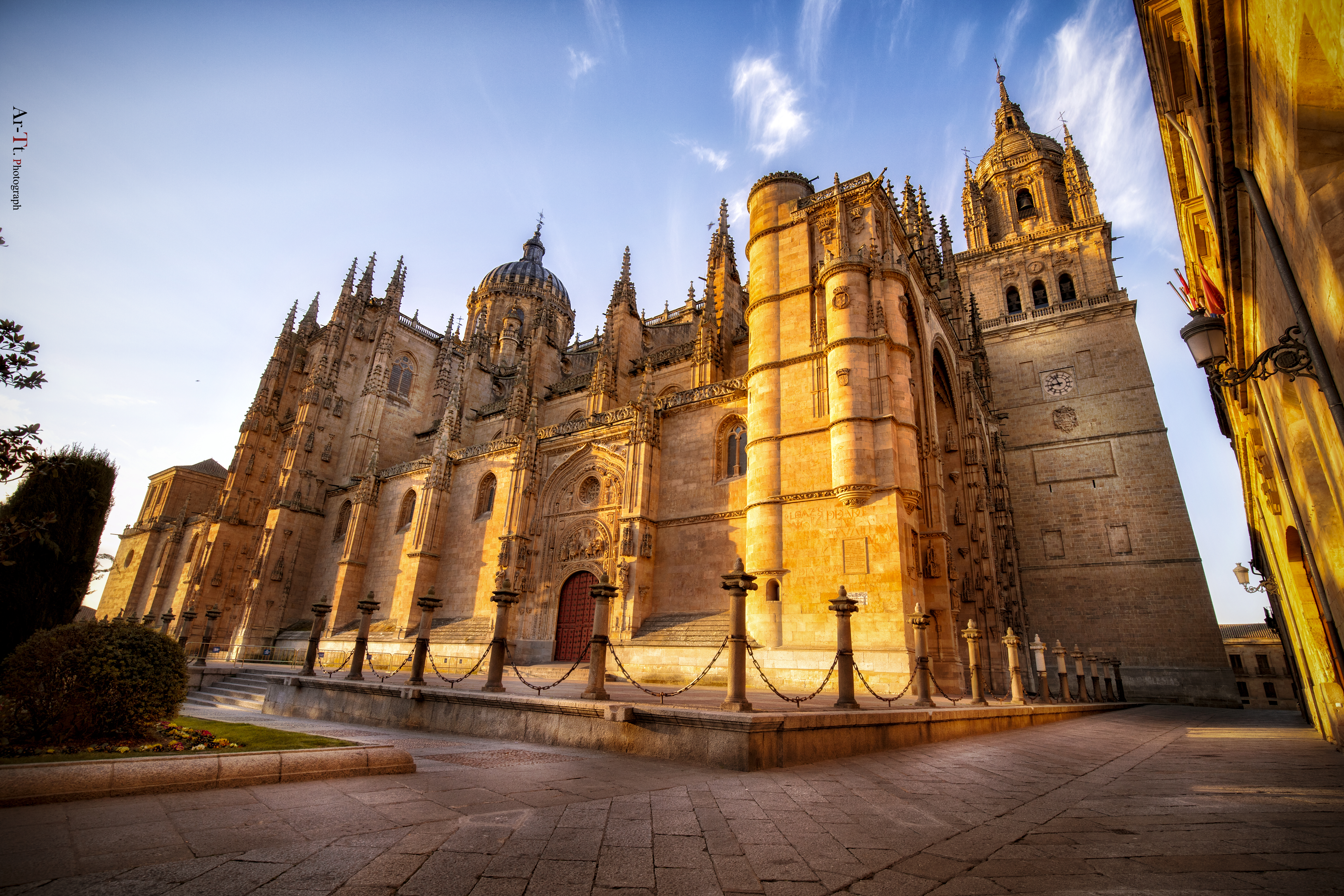
View of the facade

== Characteristics ==
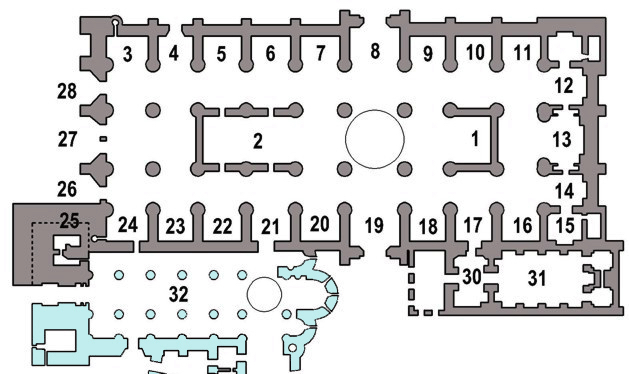
Plan of the New cathedral of Salamanca (missing references are indicated in each section of the article): 17 Puerta de las sacristías 19 South Door 25 Tower, built over the bell tower of the Old cathedral of Salamanca. 26 Right Door 27 Portada del nacimiento 28 Left Door 30 Sacristy 31 Sacristy 32 Old cathedral of Salamanca

The cathedral is, together with Cathedral of Segovia, one of the last two cathedrals of Gothic style to be built in Spain. The new cathedral was built, continuing with the late Gothic of its origins, between the 16th and 18th centuries, although at the end of the 16th century the chevet, thought with a Gothic ambulatory, was changed for a flat one and during the 18th century two elements were added that broke strikingly with the predominant style of the temple: a Baroque dome over the transept and the upper bodies of the bell tower. This bell tower is 93 meters high.

The plan and elevation of the building maintain a Gothic uniformity and the exterior presence of flying buttresses and buttresses, as well as the interior elevation of the naves attest to this.

The interior of the cathedral is very similar to that of the Cathedral of Seville. However, despite the fact that the side naves are not at the same height as the central nave, following the "ad triangulum" scheme typical of Gothic architecture, the church gives the impression of great amplitude and luminosity due to the compensation in height and the achievement of the interior space. The triforium, typical of buildings from the late Romanesque period, is replaced by two tribunes running around the perimeter of the cathedral and at two heights, allowing the aisles to be raised even higher. The pillars collect the weight of the vaults where each of the ribs of the vaults descends to the floor by the pillar in a thin column that helps to unload the weight. The vaults have all kinds of combinations of ribs, cambered and terceletes, which make them very attractive for their variety and complexity of work.

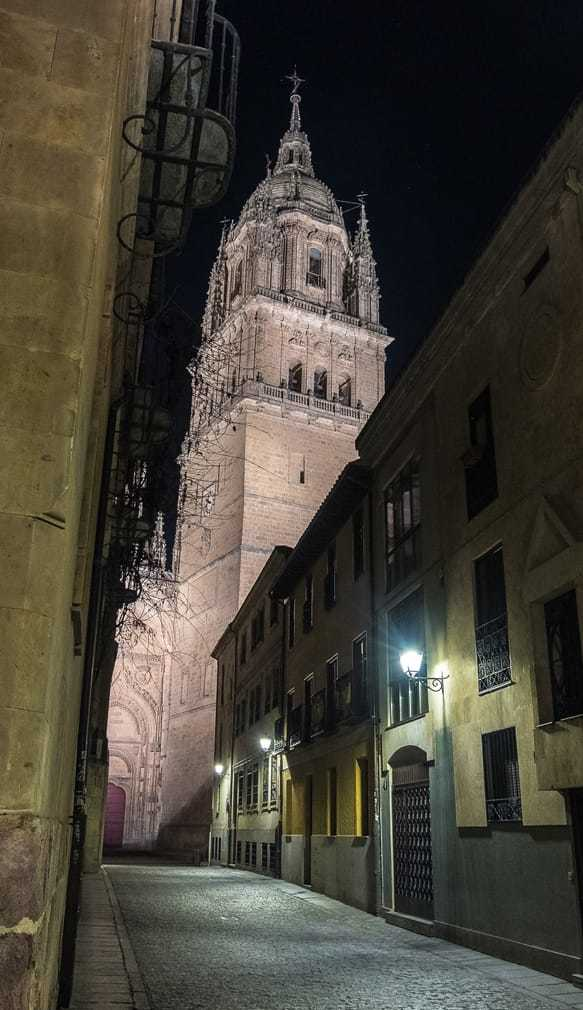
The tower seen at night

The New Cathedral has a plan with three naves and two more chapels-horns, which were finished in 1520 by Juan Gil de Hontañón the ones on the left and Juan de Álava the ones on the right. In 1538 Rodrigo Gil de Hontañón became the master builder of the cathedral, after the death of his father Juan Gil de Hontañón. At first an ambulatory was planned for the chevet and polygonal apses, but the delay in the work made the criteria change to a flat chevet, a decision taken in 1584 by the then master builder Juan Ribero de Rada, following the chevet model designed by Juan de Herrera in the Cathedral of Valladolid. In 1588 the Cantabrian master Juan de Nates was called in to continue the work.

The original dome was erected by Joaquín de Churriguera when the works were resumed, after being stopped for almost the entire 17th century, due to lack of budget. It was finished in 1725 and it seems that it was similar to that of the Cathedral of Burgos, with ribs and baroque decoration. The earthquake of Lisbon in 1755 cracked the central dome and replaced it with another Neoclassical one made by the architect Juan de Sagarvinaga, which is the one that can be seen today.

== Main Chapel ==
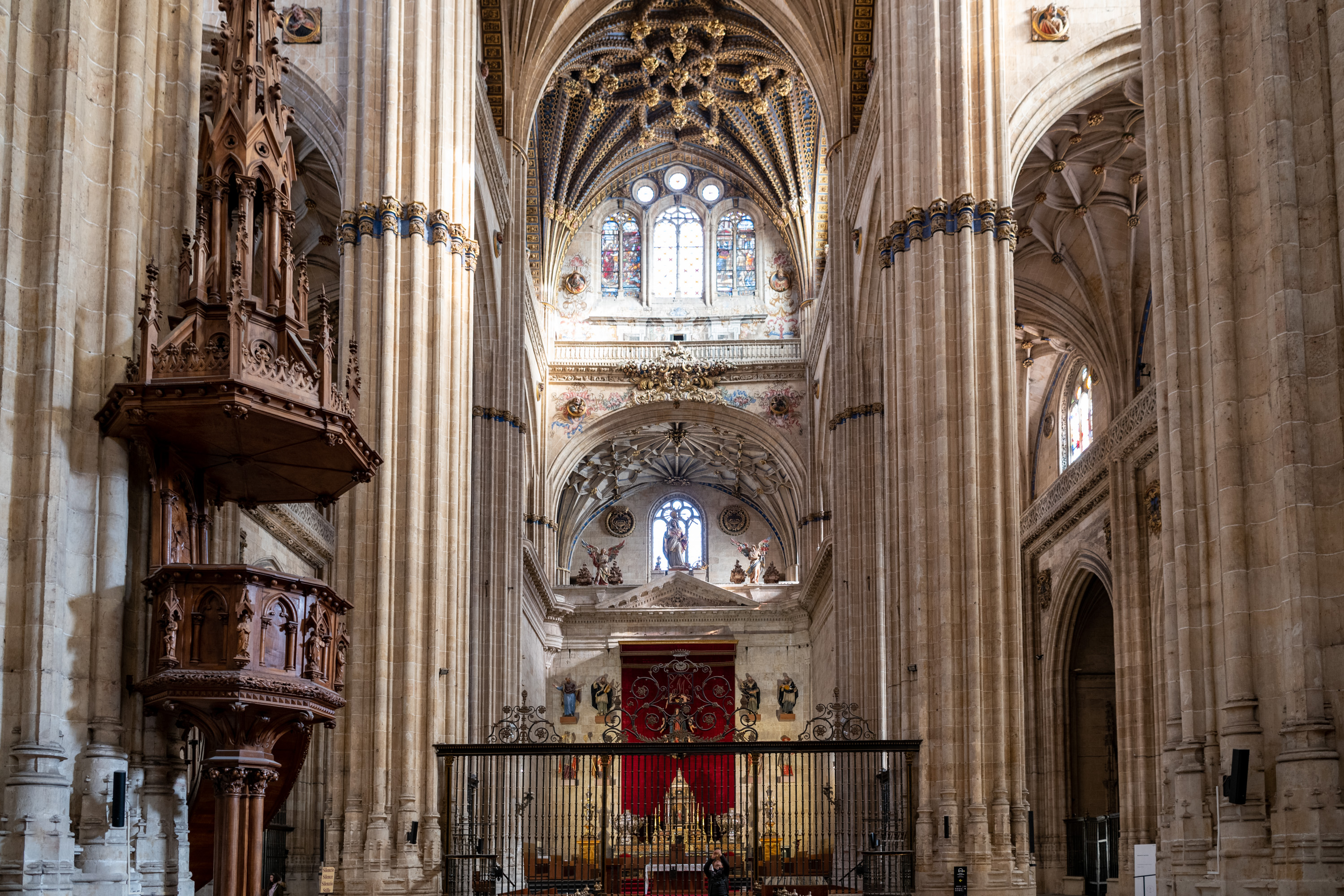
Gothic vault of the Main Chapel

The Main Chapel has a rectangular plan, covered by starred vault with the same design as the rest of those of the central nave, but with the peculiarity that it is angled and polychrome.

The Chapel lacks altarpiece, as the one made by Alberto de Churriguera, completed only 11 years earlier, was dismantled in 1743. It was planned to replace it with a marble tabernacle designed by Ventura Rodríguez that would be located in the transept under the dome. The project could not be carried out due to its high cost. The Cathedral Museum, designed by Román Bravo Riesco, preserves a model of it.

On the ashlar wall there is a crimson velvet canopy and drop on which appears an image of the Virgin of the Assumption by Esteban de Rueda from 1624, polychromed by Antonio González. The angels that accompany her are the work of Francisco Sánchez.

On the entablature that crowns the walls of the presbytery appear the image of Religion, angels and Church Fathers from the disappeared altarpiece.

The marble and jasper tabernacle by Simón Gavilán (1750) and the silver urns with the remains of Saint John of Sahagún and Saint Thomas of Villanova stand out.

== Choir ==
It was built between 1730 and 1740 by Joaquín de Churriguera. The choir stalls, in two sections, high and low, are the work of several artists. The grille that closes the choir and the one that closes the Main Chapel are the work of Duperier.

=== Organs ===
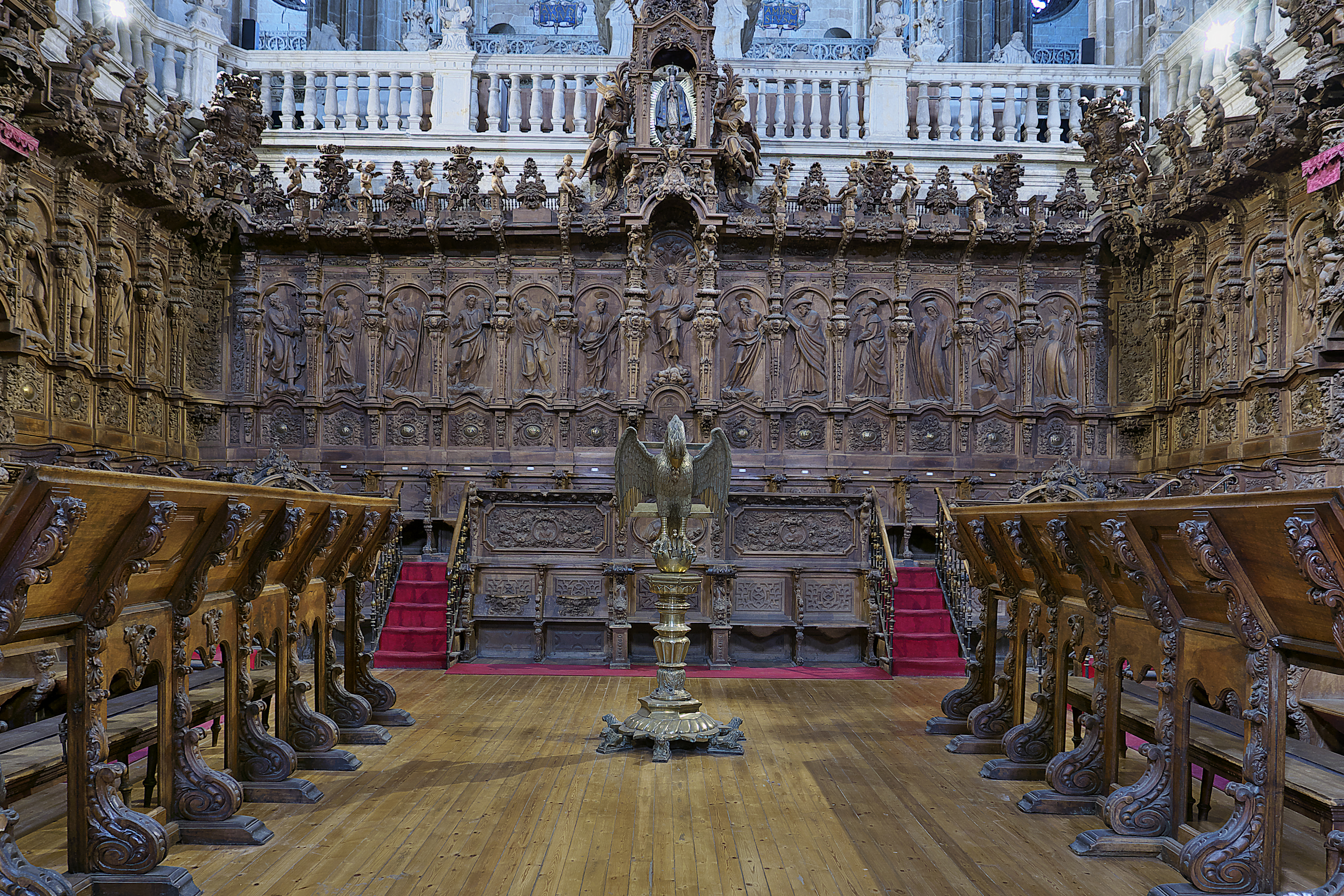
Choir stalls

The New Cathedral of Salamanca has two organs:

- The Epistle Organ, of Renaissance style. Built in the 16th century.
- The Gospel Organ, Baroque style. Built in 1744 by Master Pedro Echaverría. It was modified in the 19th century, changing its original factory. Around 1950 the organ was tuned. A Belgian specialist was called, who was astonished to learn that it had not been tuned for almost a century, given its perfect condition thanks to the dry climate of the area. In 1992, with the help of the Japanese monarchy, and at the suggestion of the Japanese master Tsuji, the organ was restored, regaining its primitive character and installing an electric system for the air pumps.

== Lateral chapels and altars ==
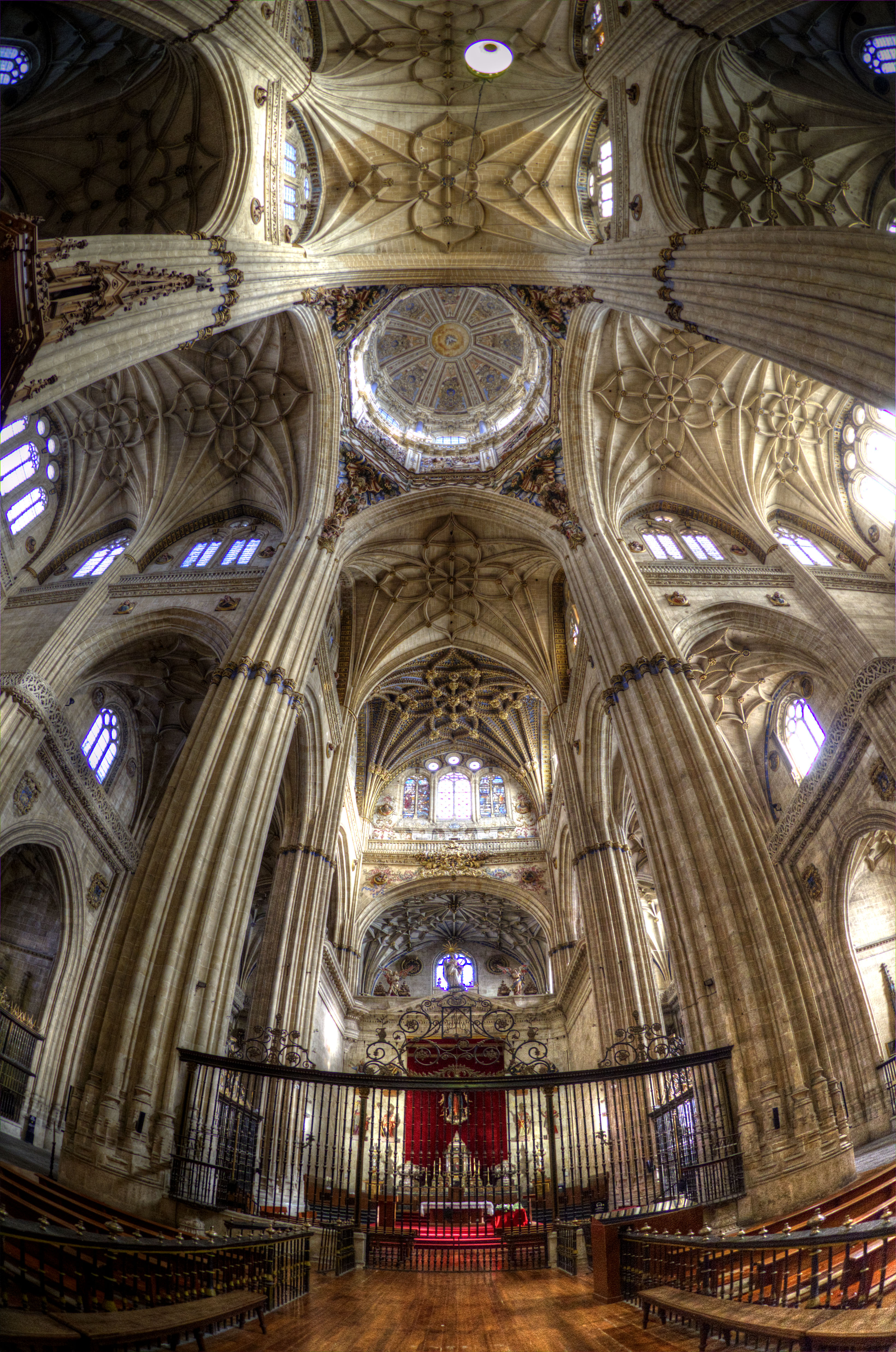
Gothic central nave of the New cathedral

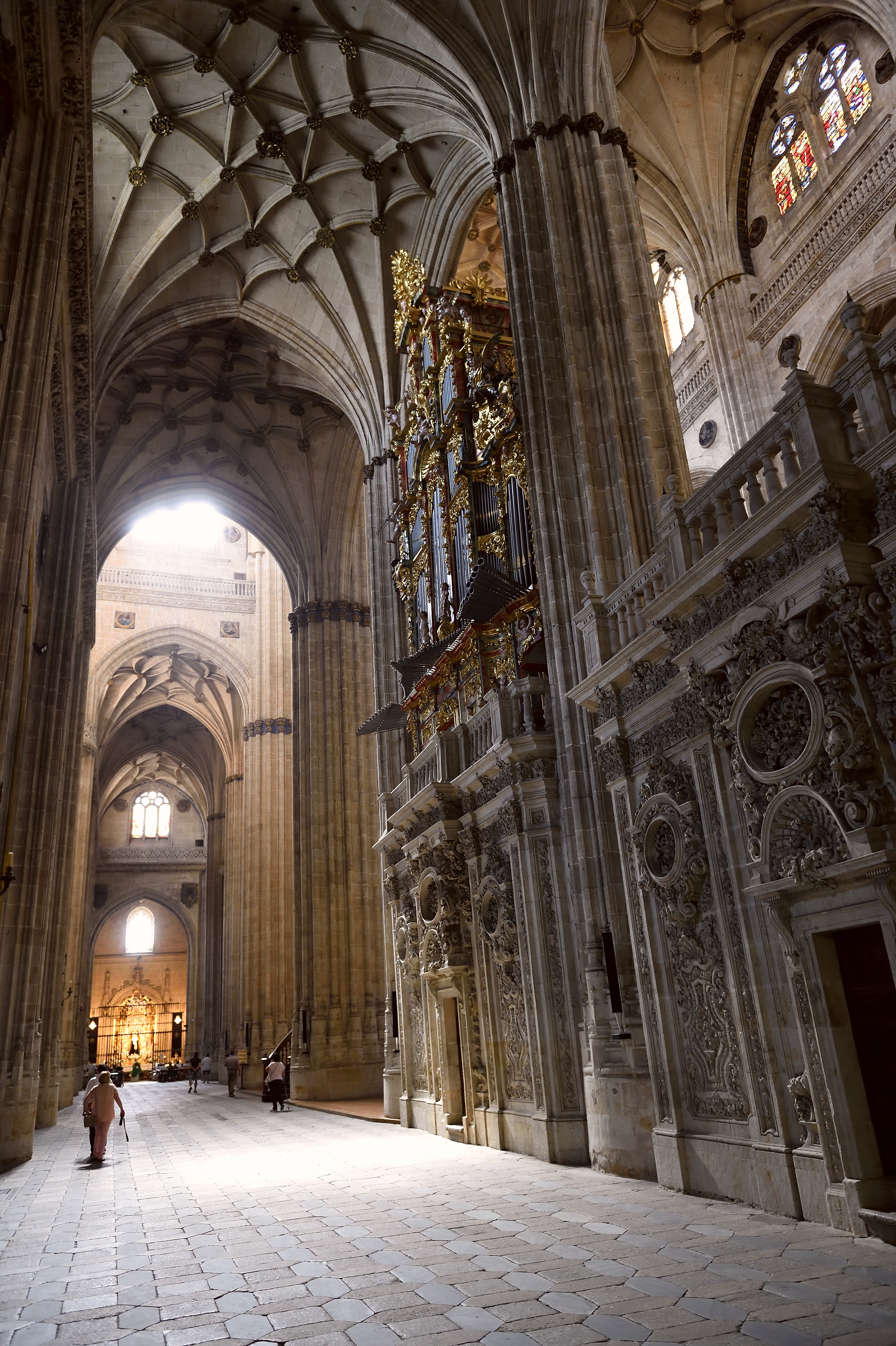
North side nave

They were designed with a single model, with the front corresponding to the part reserved for the altar or altarpiece, opening in the other walls arcosolios originally intended for burials. They are covered with different star-shaped vaults. The grilles that close them are of different styles and qualities, depending on the moment of their construction. The azulejos fronts that decorate some altars also stand out.

The chapels are the following:

=== Chapel of San Clemente ===
The altarpiece presents paintings of the Virgin del Socorro and Saint Clement. From this chapel there is access to the exterior terrace above the main doorway.

=== Chapel of Diego de Neyla ===
It is not a closed chapel as such, since it is located in the section occupied externally by the Puerta de Ramos. It highlights the tomb of Canon Diego de Neyla, who died in 1577, a Renaissance work that incorporates a panel with the Virgin, the Child and San Juanito, surrounded by angels and God the Father. Above the Gothic arcosolium there is a beautiful Renaissance fresco with the Annunciation. To the right, the tomb of Archdeacon Roque de Vergas.

=== Chapel of Santiago and Santa Teresa or de Almansa ===
The altarpiece is dedicated to the two co-patrons of Spain, work of Antonio González Ramiro in 1628 with sculptures by Antonio de Paz. The chapel also contains the tombs of two of the most influential bishops of the city in recent times: Tomás de Cámara y Castro, who died in 1904, and Francisco Frutos Valiente, who died in 1933.

=== Chapel of Nuestra. Señora de la Verdad ===
Founded by Bishop Antonio Corrionero, the tombs by Antonio de Paz stand out. It takes its name from a dispute between a Christian and a Jew in which he witnessed the image of the Virgin, from the 12th century re-carved and polychrome in the Baroque, with a slight head movement.

=== Chapel of San Antonio ===
It presents altarpiece and titular image work of local artists in the 18th century, with a canvas of the Magdalena copy of the original of Alessandro Allori, located in the attic. It emphasizes a canvas of the martyrdom of the Baptist signed in 1621 by Santiago Jerónimo Espinosa.

=== Altar of the Christ of the Redeeming Agony ===
It is located in the north arm of the transept. The image is one of the most spectacular and beautiful of all the New Cathedral. It is an anonymous work of the 15th century, it is a Crucified Christ with three nails. Its polychromy reveals a great realism in the treatment of the body and the details of the veins that can be seen in it. He is dead, with his eyes open and his mouth ajar. It has natural hair, which adds verism to the figure. It parades in the Holy Week in Salamanca with the Real Cofradía Penitencial del Santísimo Cristo Yacente de la Misericordia y de la Agonía Redentora on Holy Thursday at midnight. At the foot of the Cross there are bones and a skull that, according to tradition, represents Adam.

In front of this altar is buried Francisco de Bobadilla, the bishop who laid the first stone of the cathedral.

=== Chapel of the Virgin of la Cabeza ===
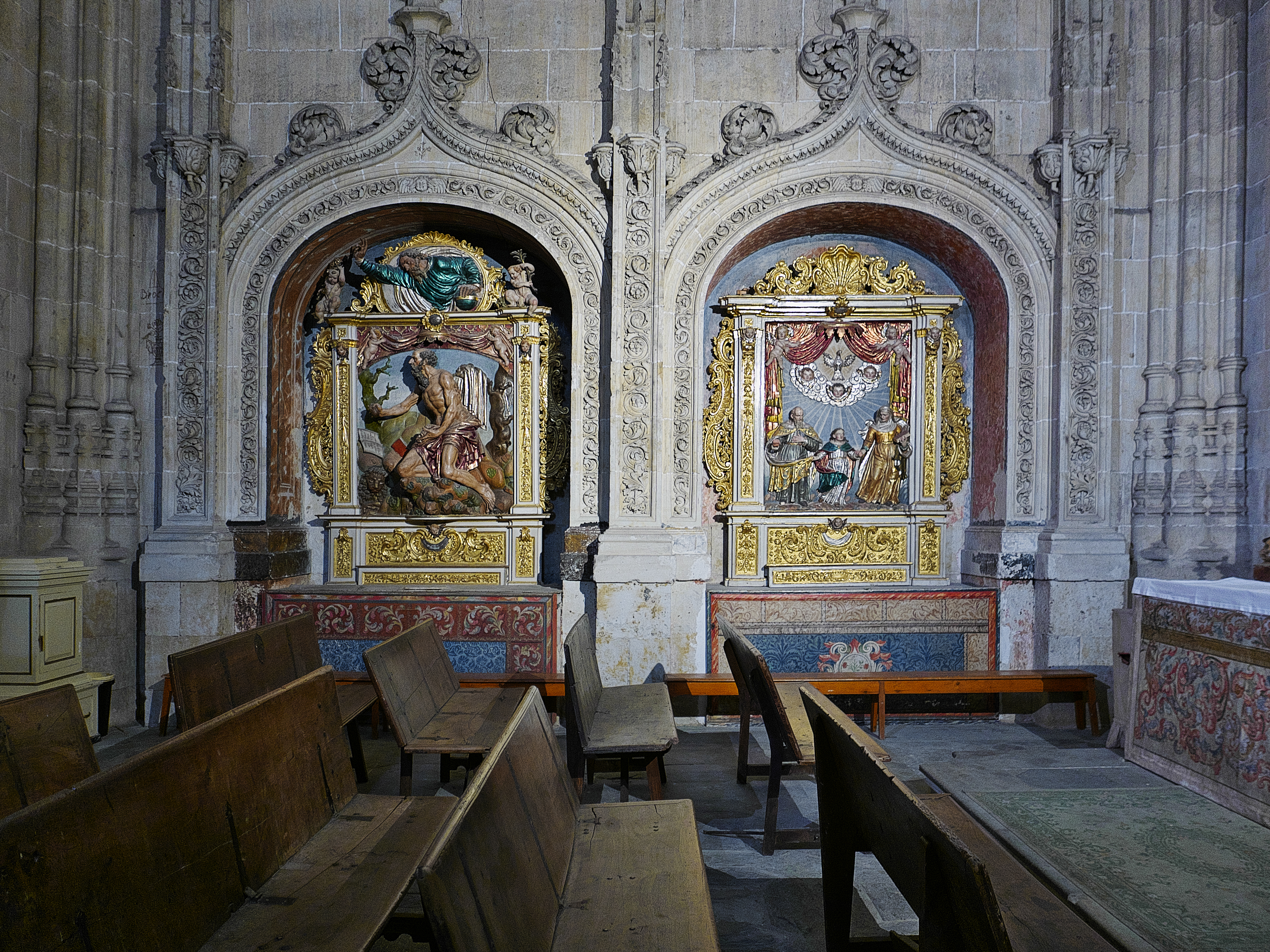
Chapel of the Virgin of the Pilar

It highlights a seated Gothic Virgin with the Child in her arms. It also guards the group of "la Borriquilla", which parades on Palm Sunday with the Hermandad de Jesús Amigo de los Niños.

=== Chapel of the Virgin of Lourdes or San Tirso (10) ===
It contains images of Fathers of the Church coming from the old tabernacle of the main altar and an image of the titular of the chapel.

=== Chapel of the Virgin of the Pilar ===
It houses an 18th-century painting representing the Coming of the Virgin to Zaragoza and a Gothic sculpture of the Virgin of Pilar.

=== Chapel of Nuestra Señora de la Soledad ===
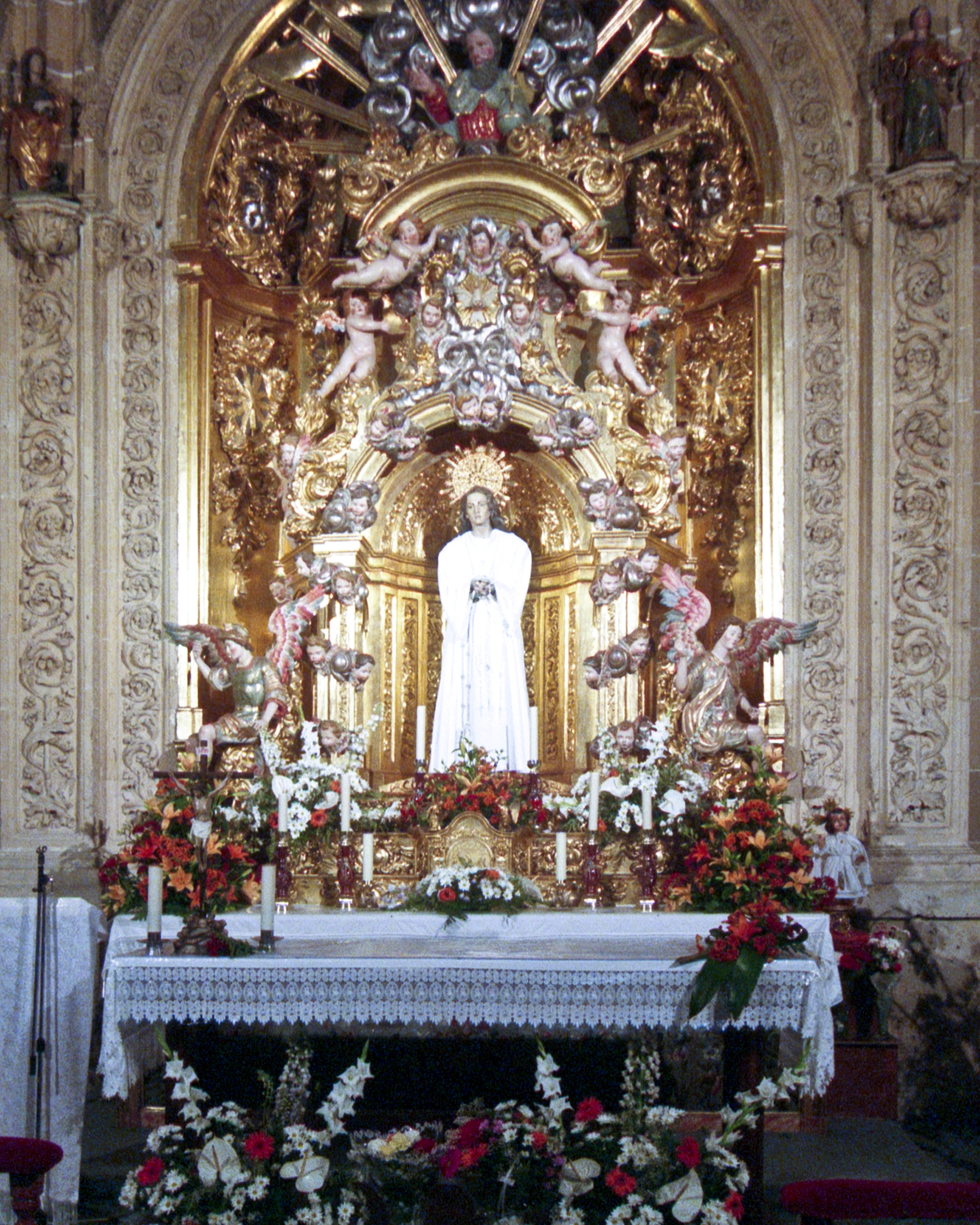
Chapel of la Soledad during Easter.

A baroque altarpiece, work of Joaquín de Churriguera, houses the carving of Our Lady of Solitude. It is an image of dress, due to Mariano Benlliure (1941), titular of the Hermandad de Nuestra Señora de la Soledad and that processes through the streets during the Holy Week in Salamanca.

=== Chapel of the Christ of the Battles ===
This chapel houses the Romanesque image of the Christ of the Battles, of flesh color and with four nails, which must be dated in the first half of the 12th century. According to tradition, the image was carried by Bishop Jerome of Périgord, the first bishop of Salamanca after the repopulation of the city, when he accompanied El Cid in his battles against the Muslims. The altarpiece that houses the Christ is a work of the first half of the 18th century made by Alberto de Churriguera and donated by the bishop José Sancho Granado in 1734. Also found in the chapel are an urn with the remains of Bishop Jerome and an image of the Virgin of Carmel by Antonio de Paz.

=== Chapel of San José ===
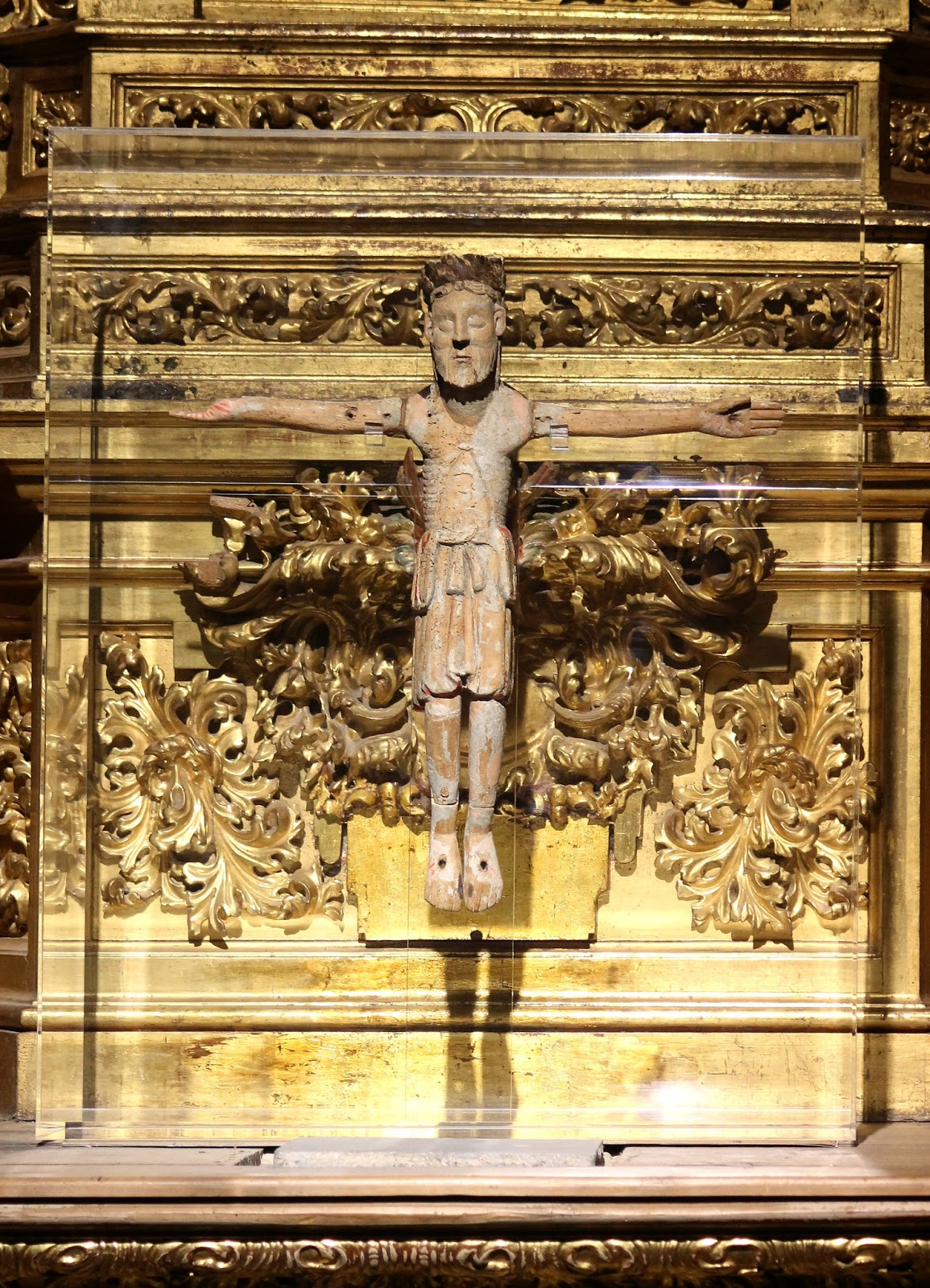
Romanesque Christ of the Battles, made in the 12th century.

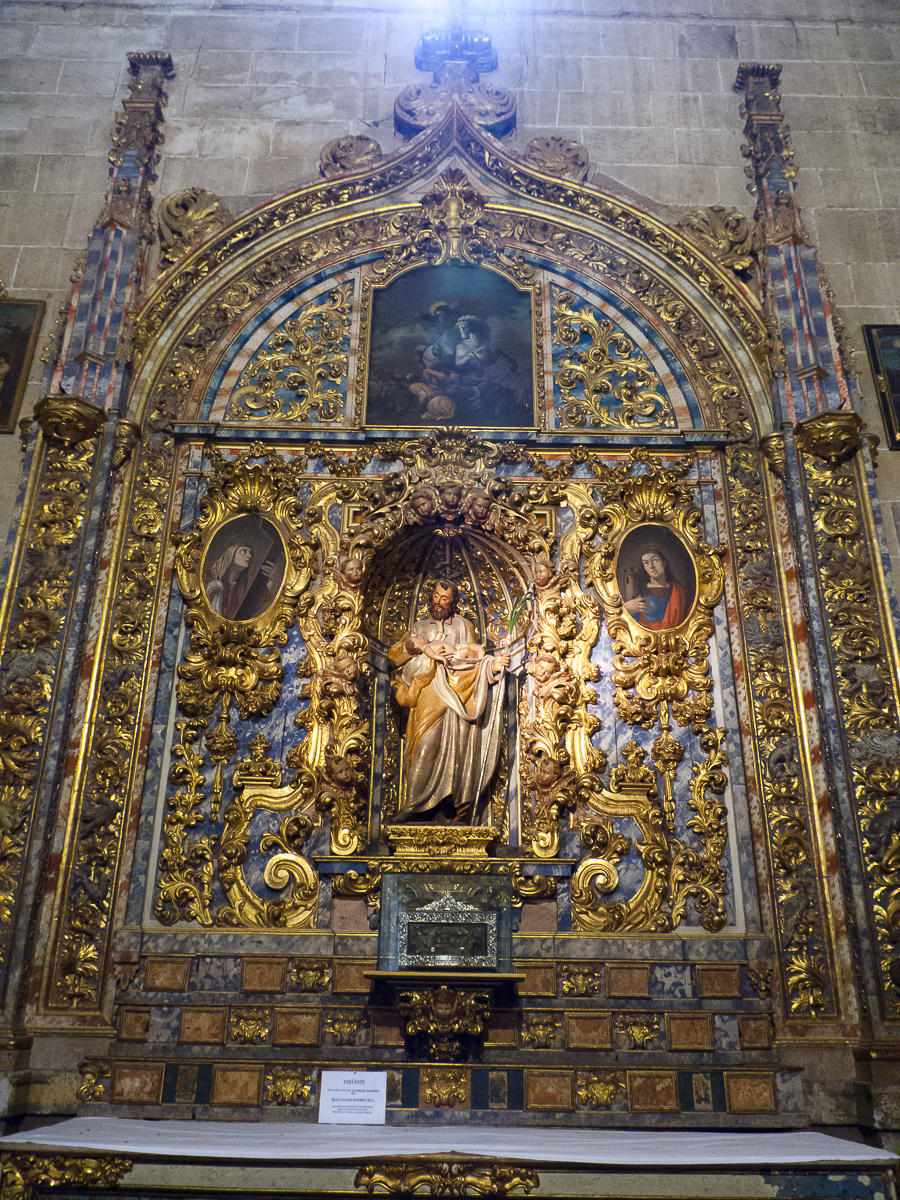
Chapel of San José

It presents a Baroque altarpiece of rocaille reminiscent of the Portuguese style, with a fine image of St. Joseph with Child and paintings of St. John, the Magdalene and Santiago Matamoros.

=== Chapel of los Dolores or del Santísimo ===
It is located under the start of one of the towers designed for the chancel, accessed from the ambulatory through the Chapel of San José. The altarpiece, of Neoclassical style and designed by Juan de Sagarvinaga, is crowned by an image of God the Father and angels that could be from Carmona.

In the niche receives worship an image of the Pietà of Luis Salvador Carmona of 1760, image of the end of the Baroque. Its polychrome and the serenity of the Virgin's face announce the arrival of Neoclassicism, while the anatomy of the naked Christ is heir to the Baroque. It parades in Holy Week in Salamanca with the Hermandad Dominicana del Santísimo Cristo de la Buena Muerte.

=== Chapel of San Nicolás de Bari ===
It presents two altarpieces: a Baroque one dedicated to St. Nicholas of Bari, crowned by a painting of the Virgin with the sleeping Child, and another neoclassical one with a carving of the Immaculate Conception, attributed to Alejandro Carnicero.

=== Chapel del Jesús Nazareno ===
It shows several Italian paintings. In the altarpiece stands out the canvas of Christ and the Veronica, work of Carlo Maratta, and the oval painting of the penitent Magdalene, by Romanelli. In the arcosolios of the back there are two Neapolitan paintings with the Slaughter of the Innocents and the Expulsion of the merchants from the Temple attributed to Micco Spadaro.

=== Chapel of la Virgen del Desagravio ===
It preserves the first altarpiece in which Solomonic columns were used in Spain. It was assembled in 1664 as an act of atonement to house a canvas of the Immaculate Conception that had been outraged that same year when the face of the Virgin was slashed with a dagger by an opponent to the Dogma of the Immaculate Conception of Mary.

=== Chapel of la Virgen de Morales or de San Bartolomé ===
Formerly this chapel was the one that communicated the two Cathedrals.

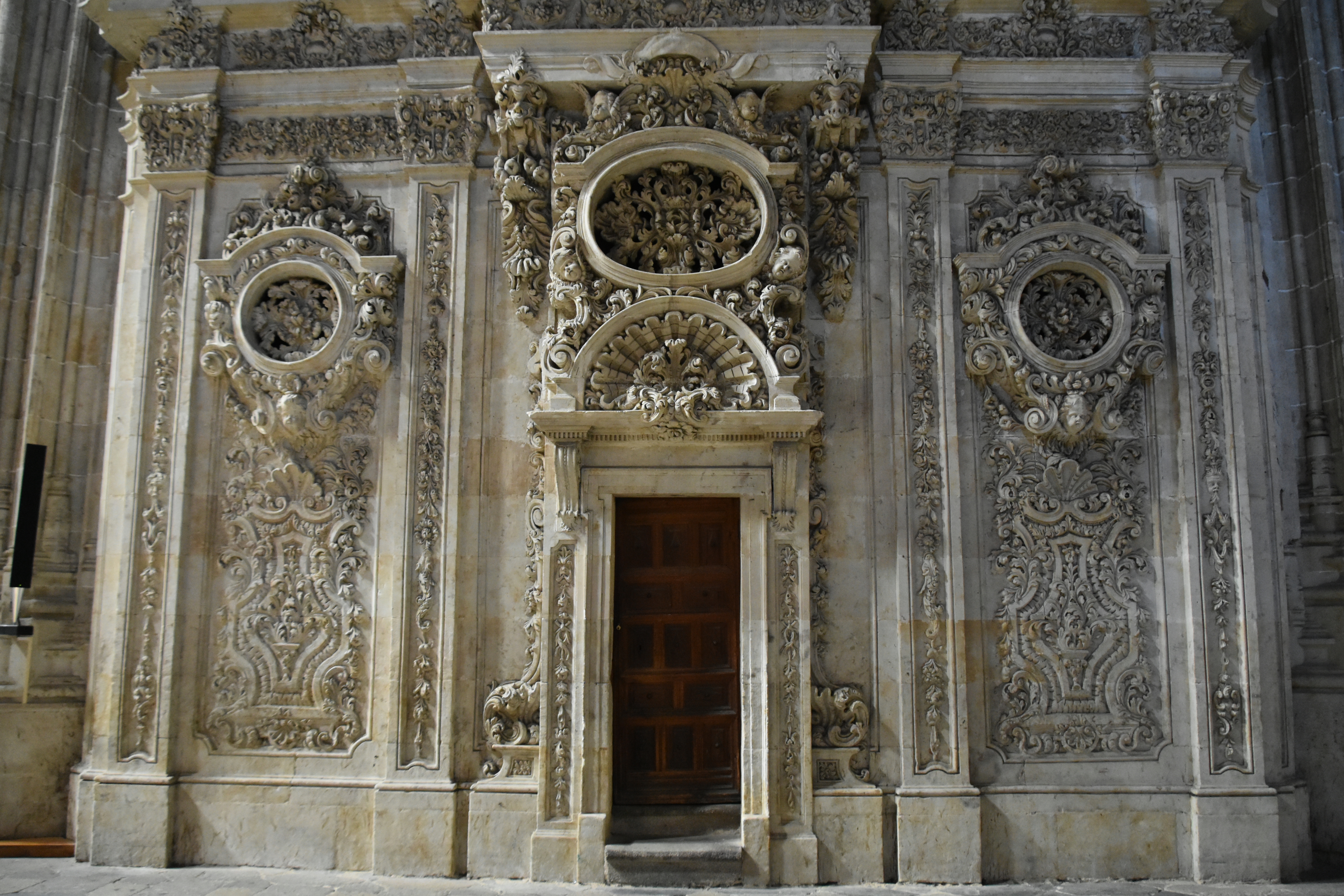
Retrochoir.

In the attic of the altarpiece there is a painting of the Virgin with the Child and San Juanito by Luis de Morales, apparently from the church of San Felices de los Gallegos. To the same author is attributed a painting of the Ecce Homo that is in the chapel. Initially the altarpiece was dedicated to St. John the Baptist, later his image was replaced by another of St. Bartholomew. The images of Saint Gregory of Ostia and St. Augustine are the work of Antonio de Paz.

Also kept in this chapel is the image of the Recumbent Christ of Mercy, work of Enrique Orejudo in 1991, which parades in Holy Week with the Real Cofradía Penitencial del Santísimo Cristo Yacente de la Misericordia y de la Agonía Redentora.

=== Chapel of the President ===
It has this name because it was endowed in 1577 by Don Francisco Fernández de Liébana, President of the Royal Chancery of Valladolid. In the altarpiece stand out a copy of the Burial of Christ by Titian, whose original is in the Museo del Prado, and the Apparition of Christ Resurrected to his Mother, both seeming to be the work of Fernández Navarrete, the Mute. Also found in the chapel are the Virgin of Bethlehem, attributed to "La Roldana", and a bust of Ecce Homo by Pedro Hernández of the 17th century, from the disappeared Church of San Adrián of Salamanca.

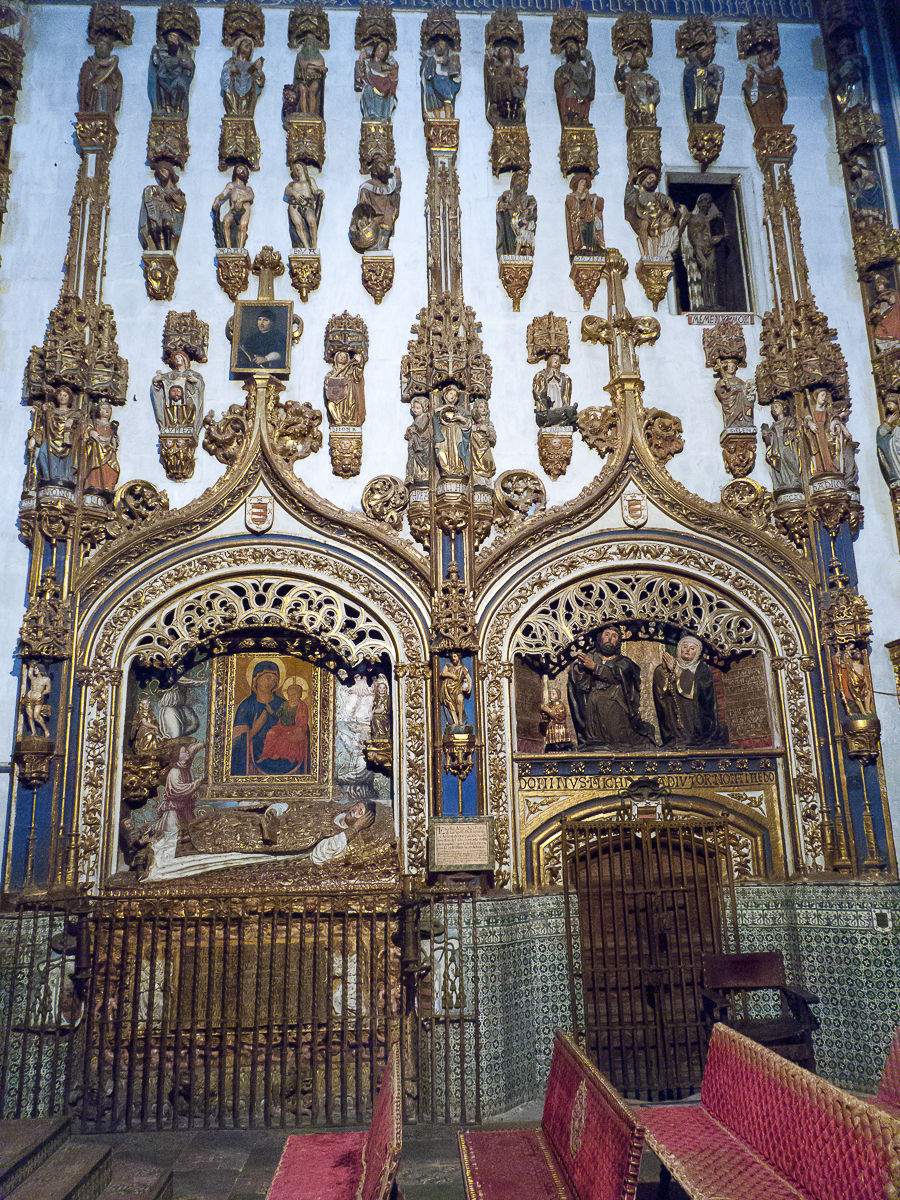
Golden Chapel, also known as the chapel of All Saints

=== The Golden Chapel or of All Saints ===
It was ordered to be built in 1515 by the archdeacon of Alba de Tormes, Francisco Sánchez de Palenzuela. Its architecture corresponds to Juan de Álava. It has several arcades that house different tombs, among them those of the founder of the chapel. All the walls are decorated with about 110 statues whose golden color stands out, hence the name of the chapel. There are sculptures of characters from the Old and New Testament, including apostles, saints, sibyls, prophets, etc.. The sculptures are supported by different polychrome and gilded shelves. Quite curious are the images of Adam and Eve, which coincide with the images of Apollo and Venus that appear on the façade of the University of Salamanca. The image of death appears in a gloomy form tucked in a niche and with a toad between her legs. The toad, representation of the sin of lust, also appeared decorating the facade of the Salamanca University. A magnificent Calvary presides over the altarpiece of the chapel, placed on a pictorial background by Adiosdado de Olivares. Under it, there is an altar decorated with Talavera de la Reina azulejos.

=== Chapel of San Lorenzo ===
It was founded by Lorenzo Sánchez de Acebes and has an altarpiece with a relief of the saint's martyrdom, attributed to Antonio de Paz. From this chapel you can access to the Old Cathedral of Salamanca.

== Architectural style ==
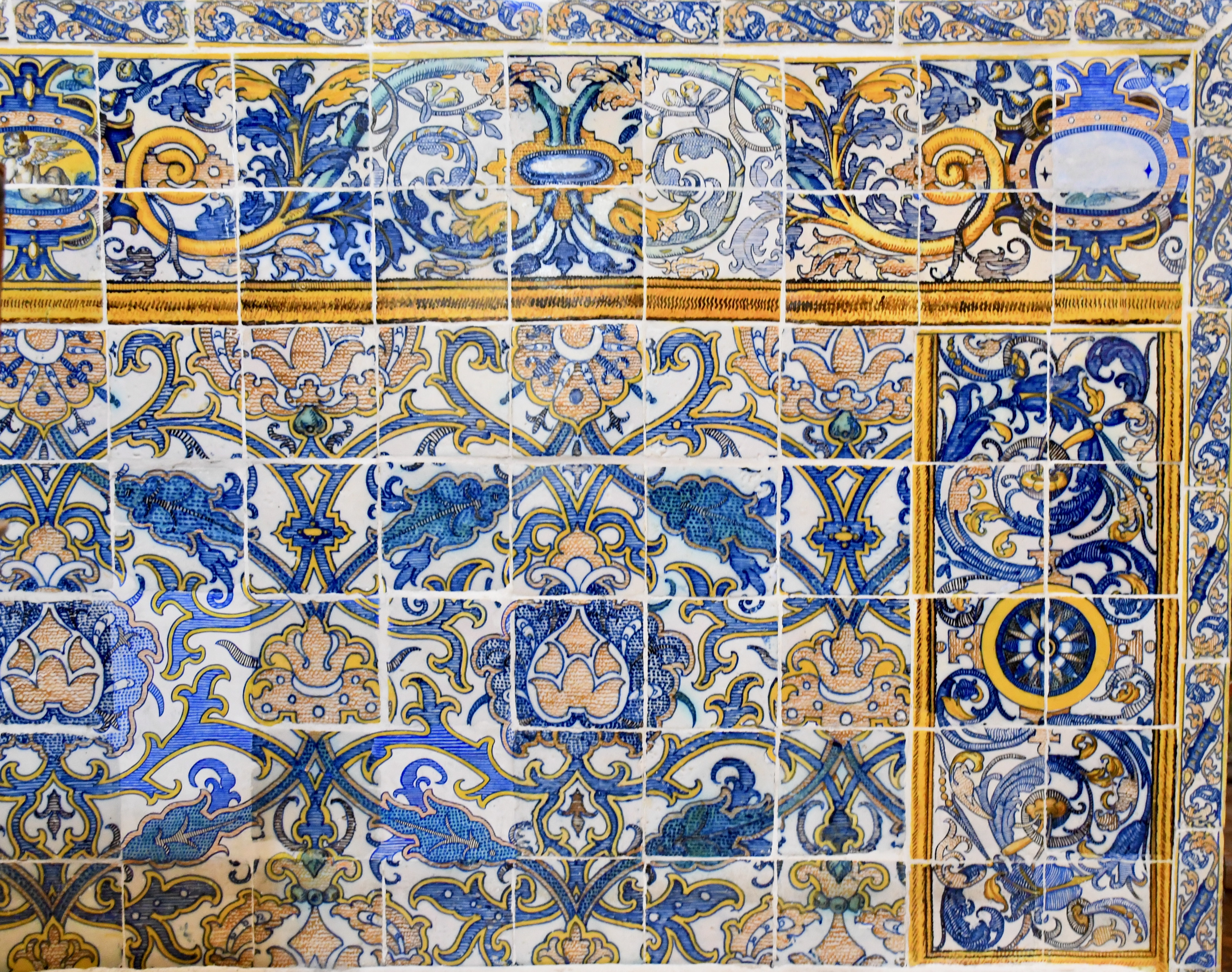
Azulejos in the Golden Chapel from the Talavera de la Reina pottery.

The building began at a time when the gothic style was becoming less popular and was merging with the new Renaissance style, giving the resulting Plateresque style in Spain. However, this cathedral retained more of its Gothic character because the authorities wanted the new cathedral to blend with the old one. Thus the new cathedral was constructed, continuing with Gothic style during the 17th and 18th centuries. However, during the 18th century, two elements were added that broke with the showy form with the predominant style of the building: a Baroque cupola on the crossing and the final stages of the bell tower (92 m). The new cathedral was constructed without the subsequent destruction of the old cathedral, but a wall of the new cathedral leans on the North wall of the old one. For this reason, the old cathedral had to be reinforced, and the bell tower was constructed on the old one. Two of the main architects of the cathedral were Juan Gil de Hontañón and his son Rodrigo Gil de Hontañón in 1538.

Its main entrance consists of three richly decorated arcs, each leading to the three naves (sections) of the church.

== 1992 restoration ==
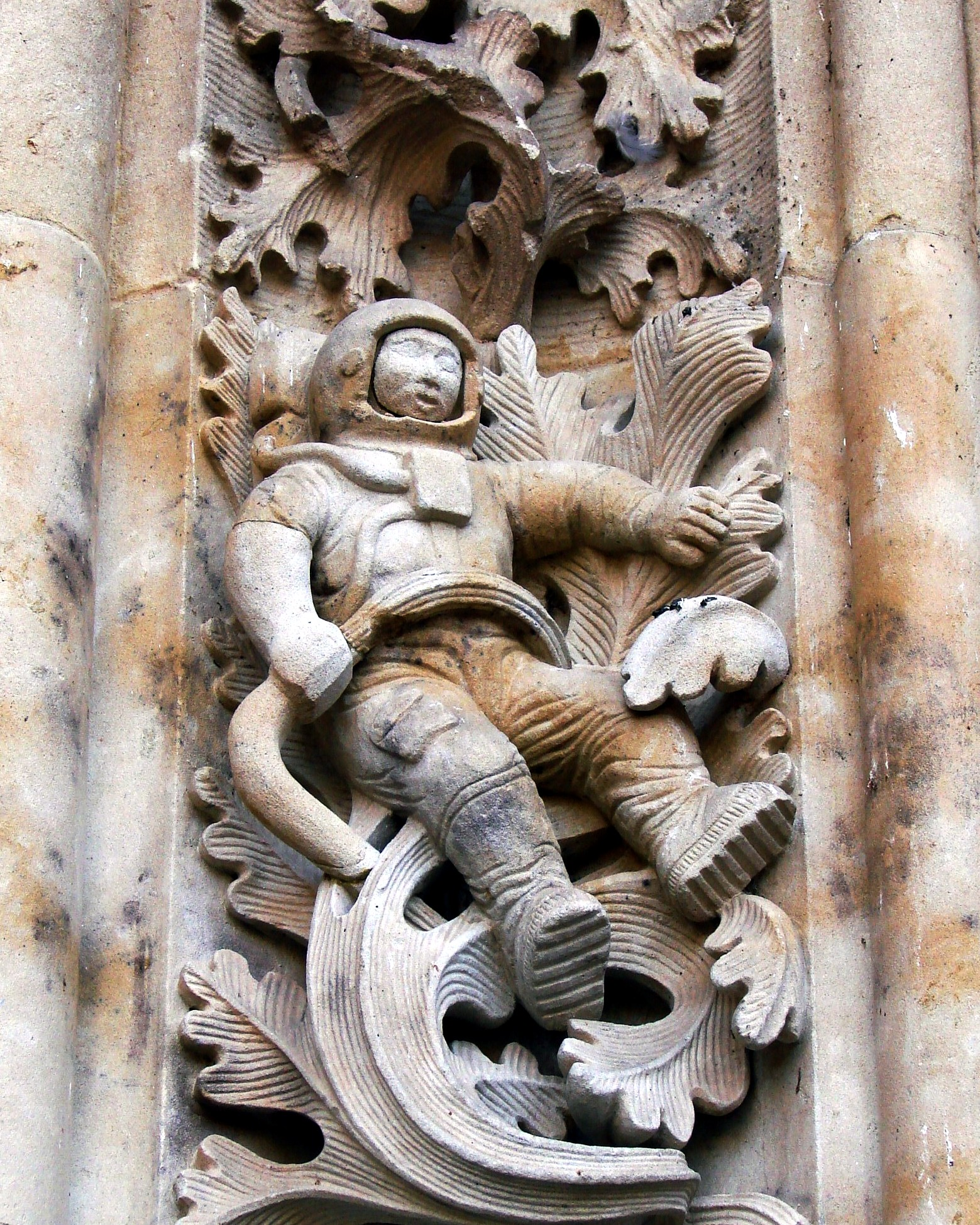
Astronaut sculpture

- Astronaut. In the Puerta de Ramos (north), in front of the Palacio de Anaya, there is an anachronistic figure of an astronaut sculpted on its left flank. On the occasion of Salamanca hosting the exhibition Las Edades del Hombre in 1993, it was decided to restore the door, which had deteriorated greatly due to the passage of time. During this restoration, the astronaut was carved in stone in 1992 by stonemason Miguel Romero, following the tradition of incorporating a contemporary element in each restoration. On September 20, 2010, it appeared with a broken right arm due to an act of vandalism.
- Other ornaments. Below the astronaut is a lynx, to his right a bull, below the bull is seen a dragon with a three-ball ice cream who is smiling. Further to the right, next to the door, there are three figures: a crayfish, a stork and a hare representing, respectively, water, sky and earth in Salamanca.

== See also ==
- Alberto de Churriguera
