= Mirat =

Spanish agriculture company

Coordinates: 40.958302°N 5.655653°W

S.A. Mirat
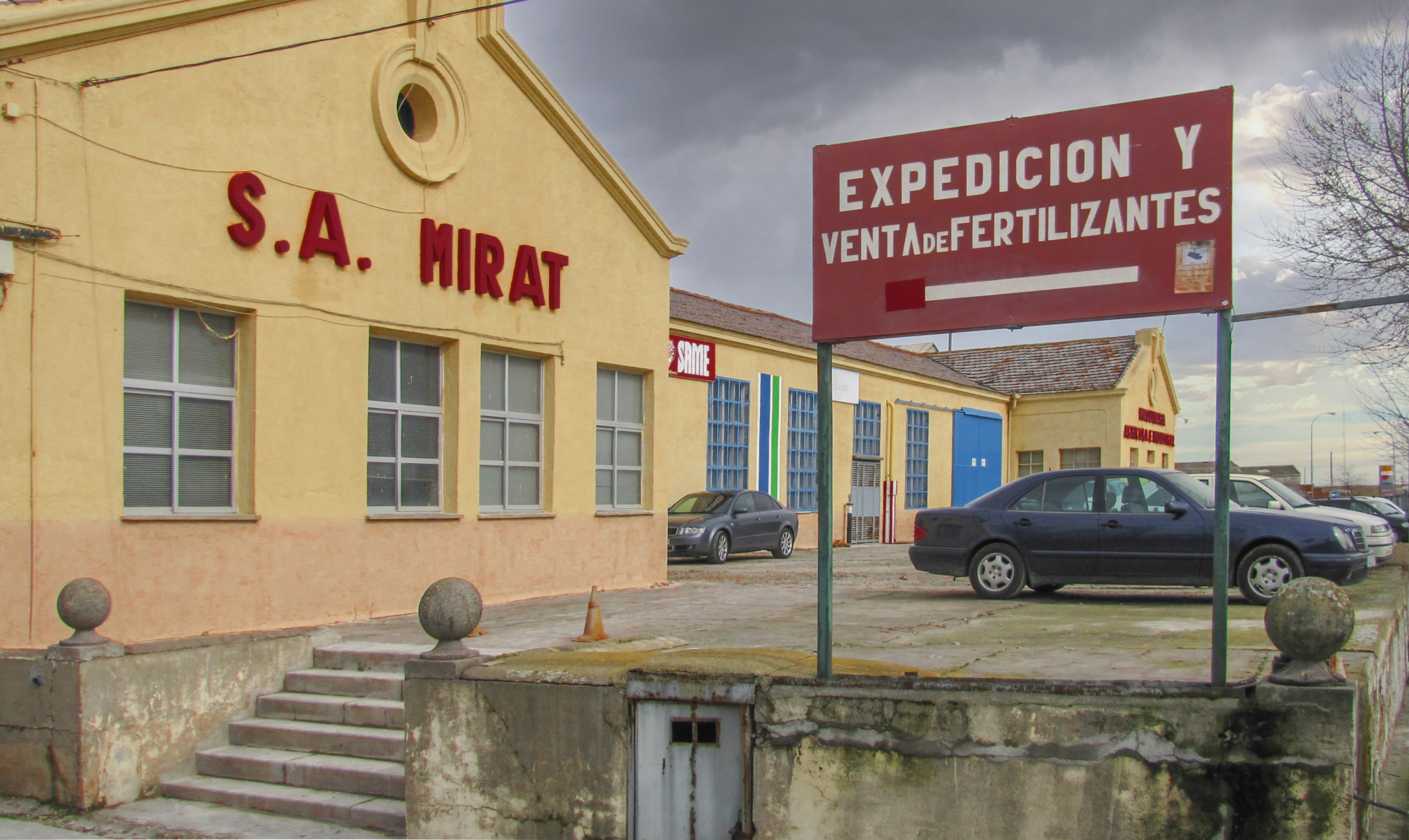
- Company type: S.A. (corporation)
- Industry: Agriculture
- Founded: 1812
- Headquarters: Salamanca, Spain
- Area served: European Union and North Africa
- Products: Manure, fertilizer, gardening,...
- Revenue: €83 million
- Number of employees: 183
- Website: www.mirat.net

S.A. Mirat, also known as Grupo Mirat (Mirat Group), or just as Mirat, is a Spanish company founded in 1812 in Salamanca, dedicated mainly to production of manures and fertilizers. Nowadays it is one of the 100 biggest companies in Castile and León and the biggest one in the agricultural sector in the province of Salamanca. Its commercial activity is focused on Spain and Portugal.

Its trademark Vitaterra is the largest Spanish manufacturer of garden manures and fertilizers.

The factories and structures of Mirat is the only well conserved prototype of the industry of Salamanca from the 19th century. The interior of the factory contains the remains of the Convent of Nuestra Señora de la Victoria (Our Lady of the Victory) of the 15th century, which belonged to the Order of Hieronymites.

== History ==
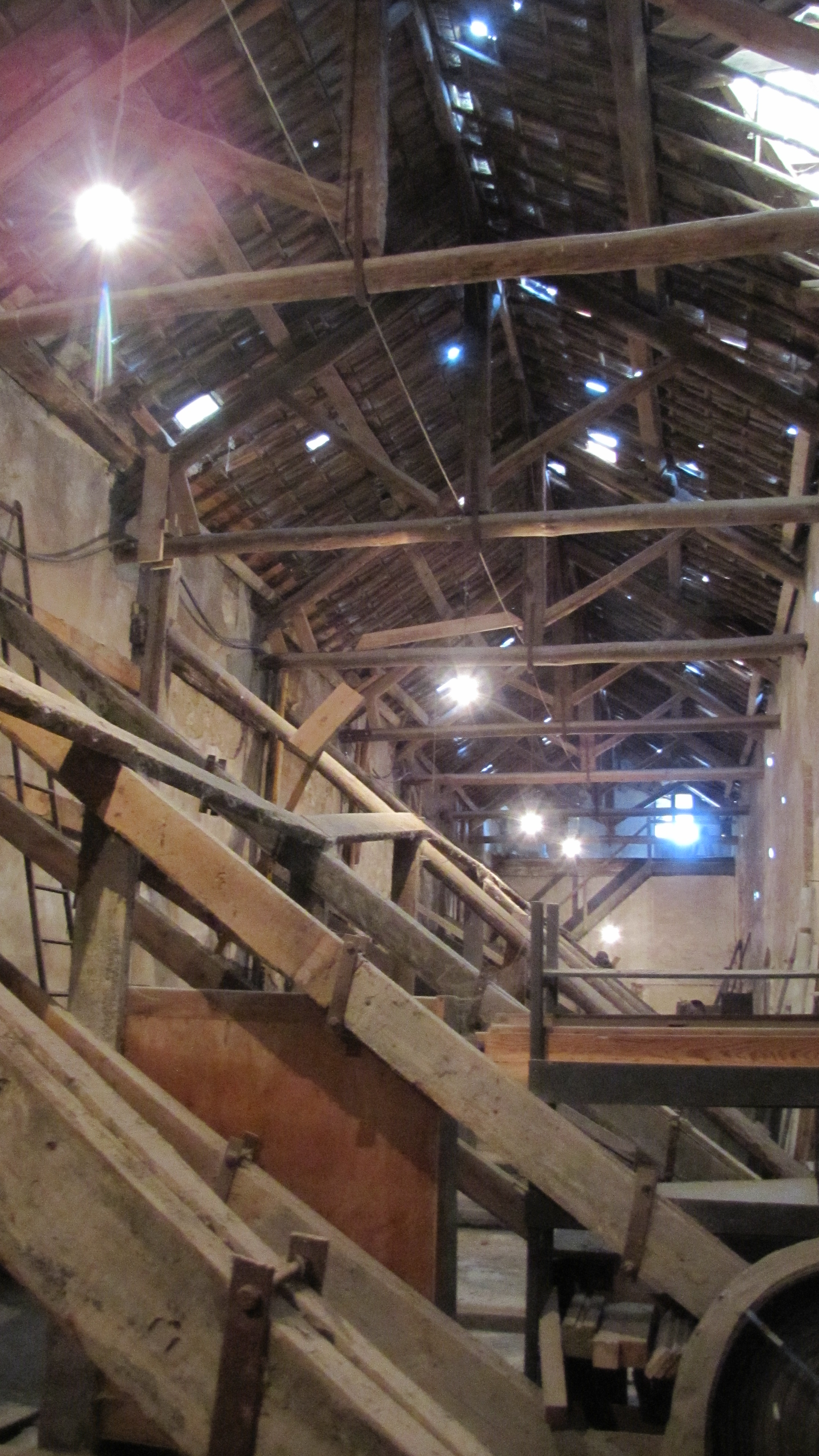
Wood pillaring of the beginning of the 20th century, in the old workshops of Mirat in Salamanca

The origins of the company began in 1812, the year in which Gregorio Mirat installed a starch factory in Salamanca (Spain). Afterwards, different lines of the business were developed. In 1841, his son Juan Casimiro was born, he would be very important in the development of Mirat. In 1853, Gregorio introduced his son into the business, and later the factory was called "Mirat e Hijo" (Mirat and Son).

Juan Casimiro applied knowledge acquired on his trip to France and in 1876, the company started to export abroad. The same year, in 1876, the factory was moved near to the river Tormes to the Convent of Saint Jerome. In 1881, rice starch, which was important for ironing clothes started to be produced. During this time it turned into one of the first factories of Salamanca that began to use steam as a motive power. Also at their disposal was one storehouse near to the old main square that in 1902, Casimiro decided to use for reconstruction and build some small hotels. That is why even now that place is known as "Avenida de Mirat" (Avenue of Mirat).

In 1933, the company began to work as a cooperative association and in 1963, they begin to produce compound manures. The building of the factory of Mirat is the only well-conserved industrial architecture of the 19th century in Salamanca.

== Convent of Nuestra Señora de la Victoria ==
Inside the workshops of the factory there is the Convent of Nuestra Señora de la Victoria (Our Lady of the Victory) which belonged to the Order of Saint Jerome, which was founded in 1490 and after three centuries of prosperity was destroyed by French troops during the Peninsular War.

After unsuccessful industrial experiences that demolished the main part of the building the area finally fell into Mirat family hands. They then organized the production of manures using a religious part of the building that was, still is, in good condition. The factory still has remains of the walls, cellars and some parts of the old convent. Between the remains stands a huge vaulted arch of 3 meters by Juan de Álava (designer of the Casa de las Muertes (House of Death), of the College Fonseca and of the "Seven Emblems of the University of Salamanca") and some others stone emblems. The flues, the workshops of the 16th century, high arcades of bricks and arches complete the testimony of the industrialization period.

== Divisions of the Group ==
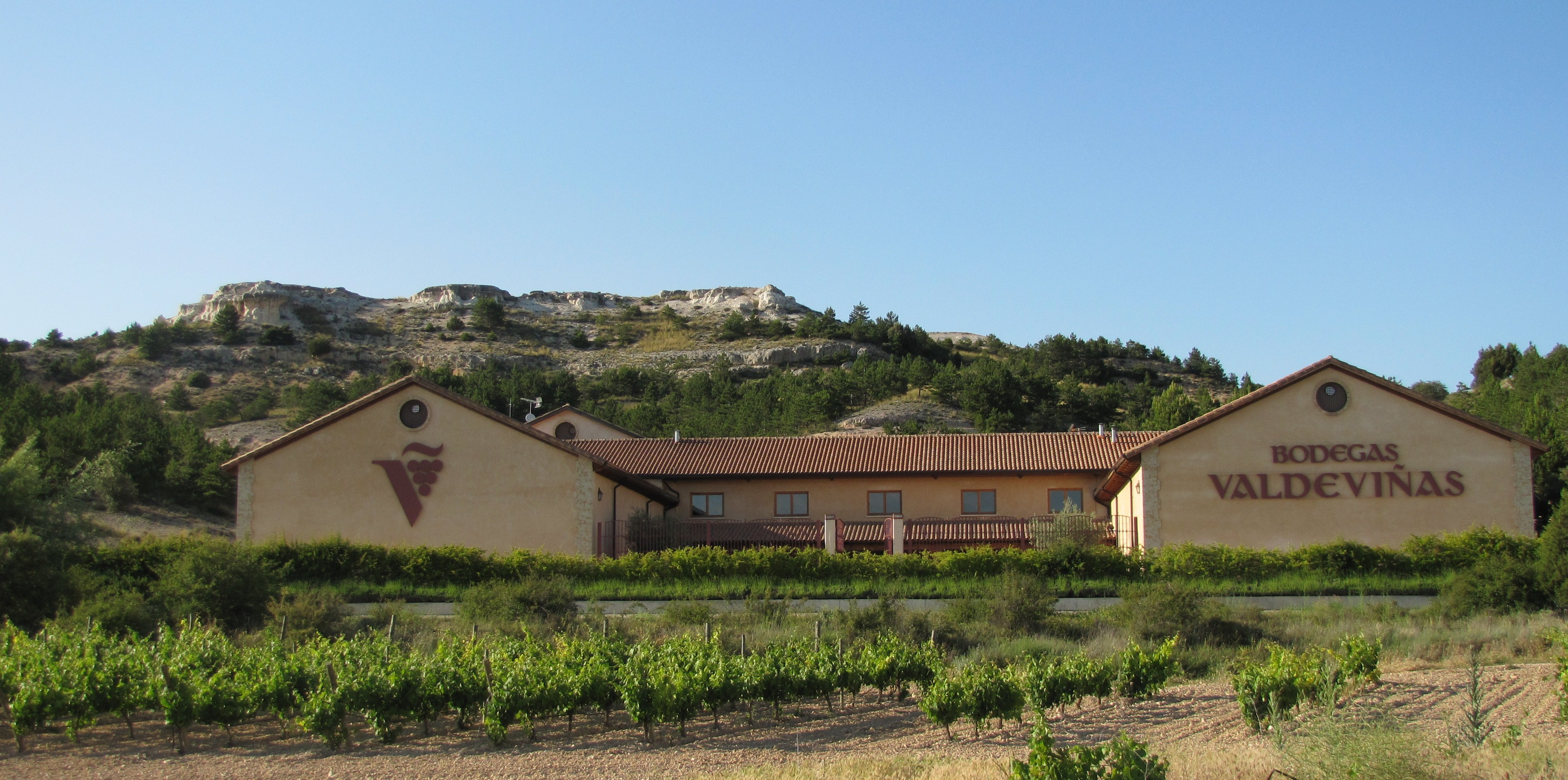
Winery Valdeviñas, in Denominación de Origen Ribera del Duero

- Fertilizers
- Seed
- Division of gardening: Vitaterra, Vitaterra Nature, Mas Plant. Vitaterra is the largest Spanish manufacturer of garden manures and fertilizers.
- Wineries Valdeviñas: Mirat, Tinar, Torrelanga.
- Agricultural machinery
- Fuel Distribution
- Bus lines
- Service points
- Plant health.

== Gallery ==
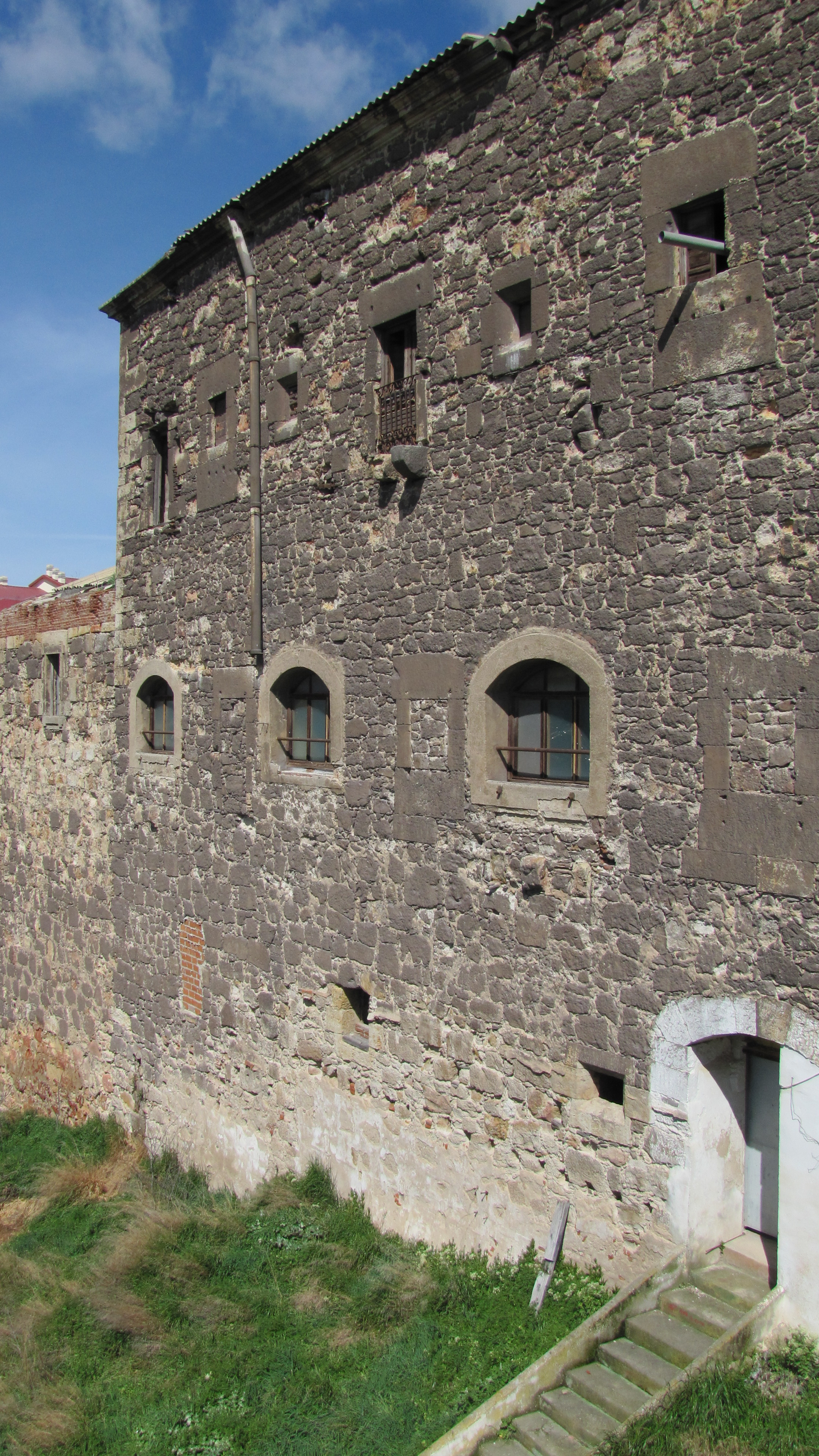
Old premises of the Convent of Our Lady of Victory

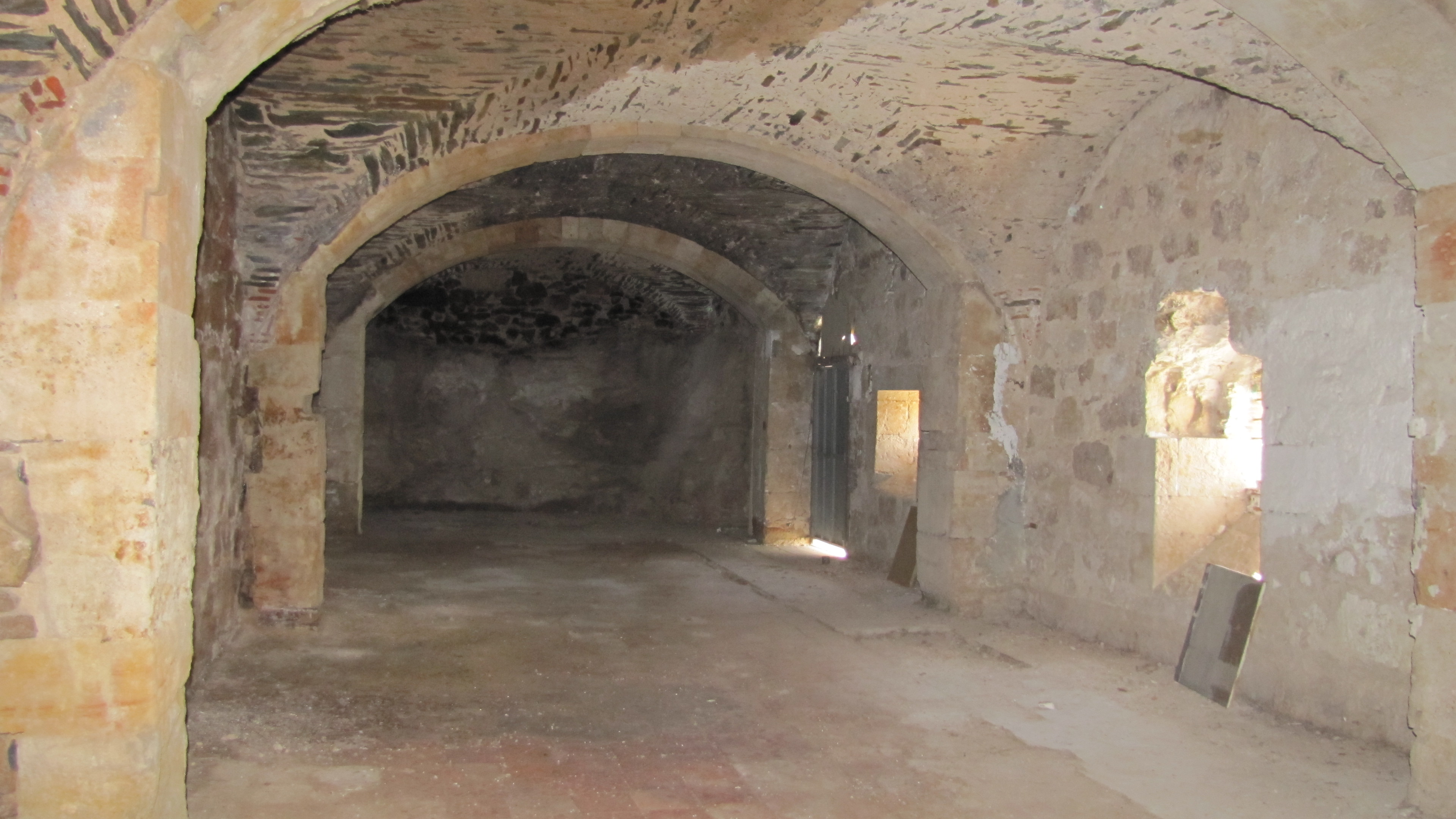
Inside the old buildings of the convent

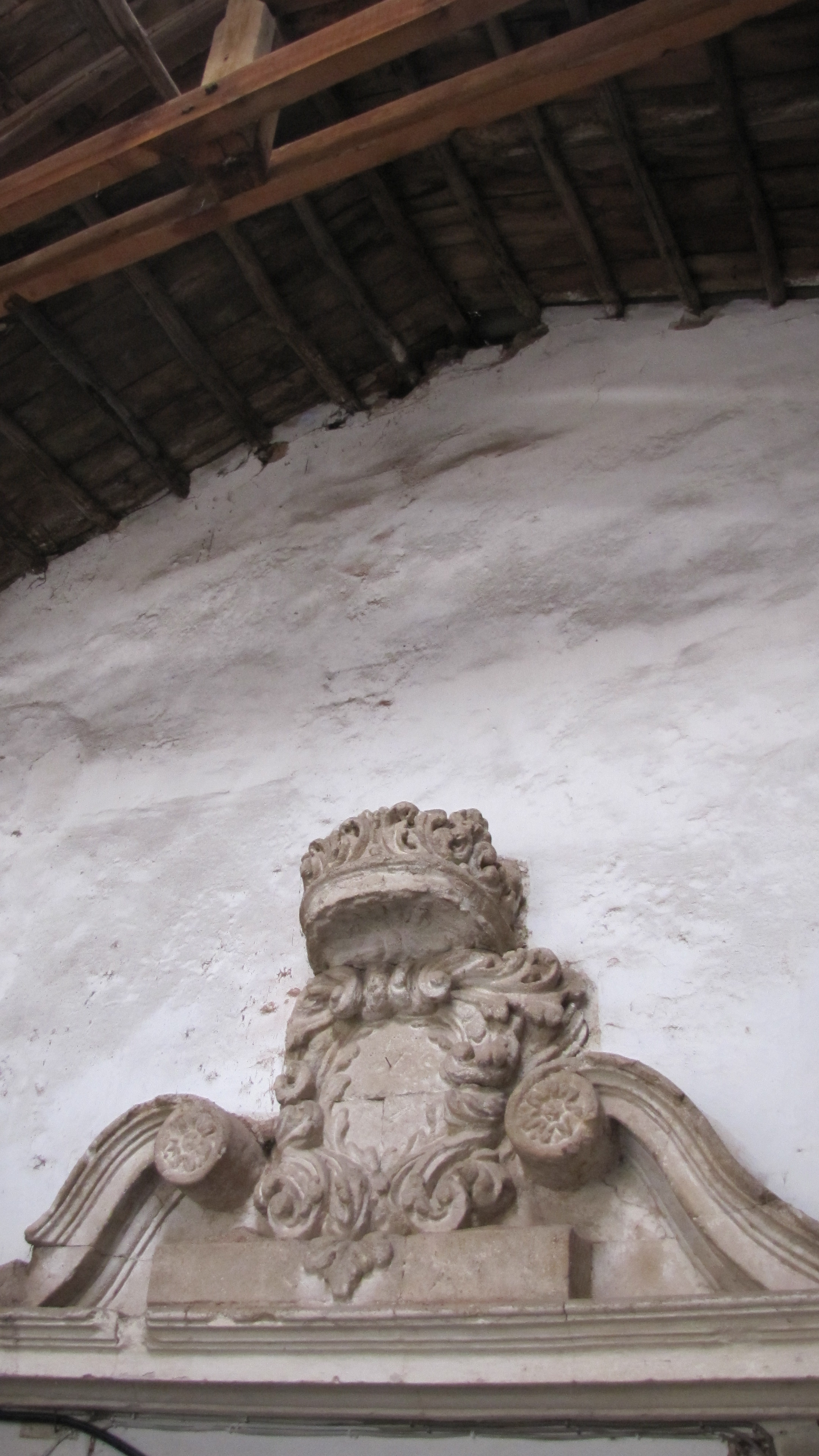
Detail of an 18th-century baroque door inside the workshops

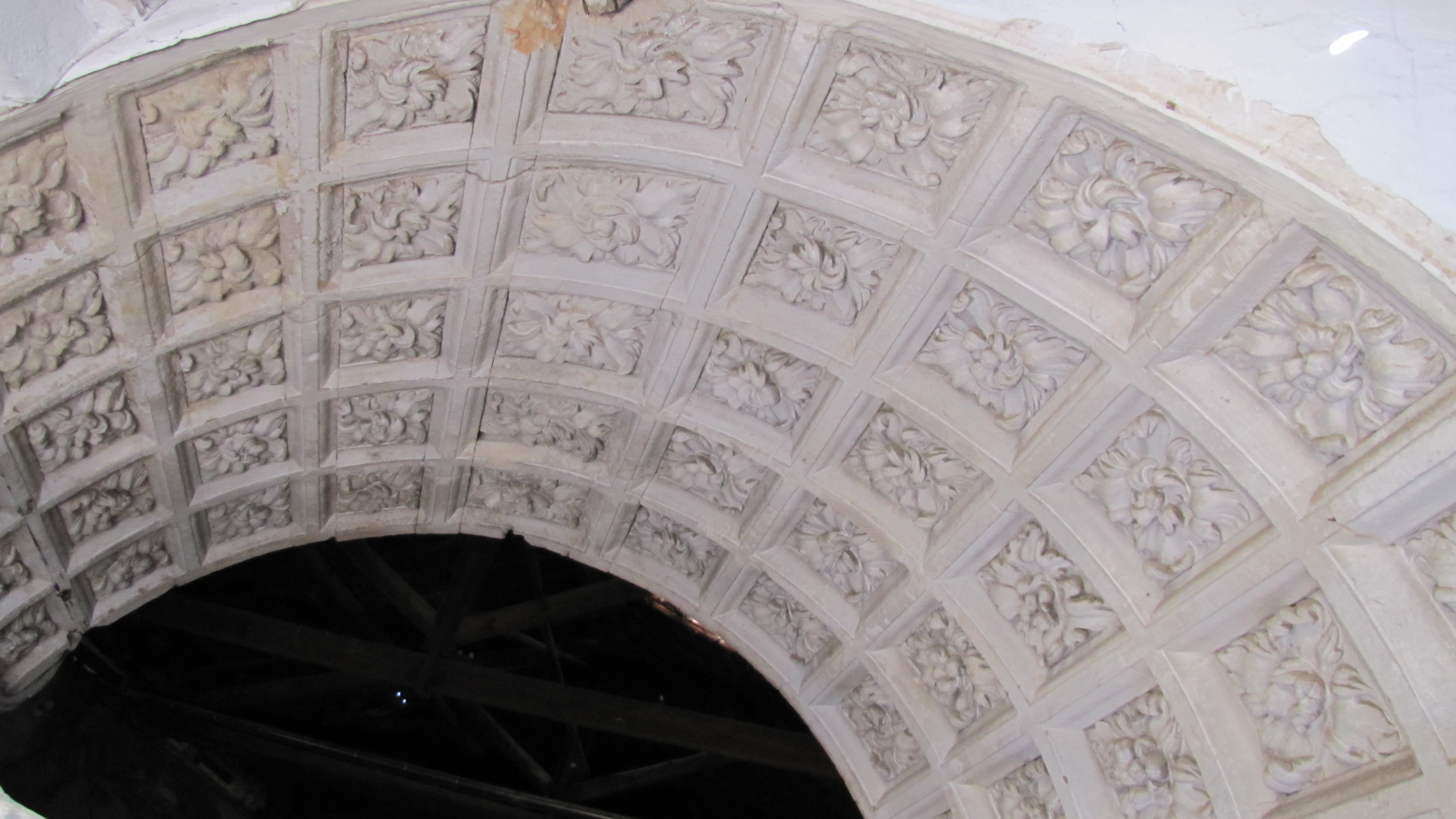
Detail of an arch above the monastery, probably work of Juan de Álava

== See also ==
- Industry in Spain
- Agriculture in Spain
- Manure
- Fertilizer

== Bibliography ==
- Martínez Frías, José María (1990), Monasterio de Nuestra Señora de la Victoria - La orden Jerónima en Salamanca, Ediciones Universidad de Salamanca. ISBN 84-7481-584-3
- García Figuerola, Miguel (2010), S.A. Mirat - 160 años de publicidad fabril, Museo del Comercio y la Industria de Salamanca. ISBN 978-84-614-3785-6
- García Figuerola, Miguel. Ordóñez, María. Zoder, Mark (2012), El Barrio de Mirat - Legado de un industrial salmantino, Museo del Comercio y la Industria de Salamanca. ISBN 978-84-615-8831-2
