= Pedro de Palencia =

Dominican friar

To be distinguished from Pedro de Agén, bishop of Palencia (d.1139)

Pedro de Palencia (fl. 1584-1620s) was a Dominican friar and professor of Hebrew in the Convent of Saint Stephen in Salamanca. He is mainly notable for his treatise on rabbinical glosses. Pedro argued from the example of Jerome that knowledge of the Hebrew, over the Greek-language Septuagint translation, was needed to defend the Latin text, particularly in disputations against Jews and heretics.
