= Palacio de Orellana =

Historic palace in Salamanca, Spain

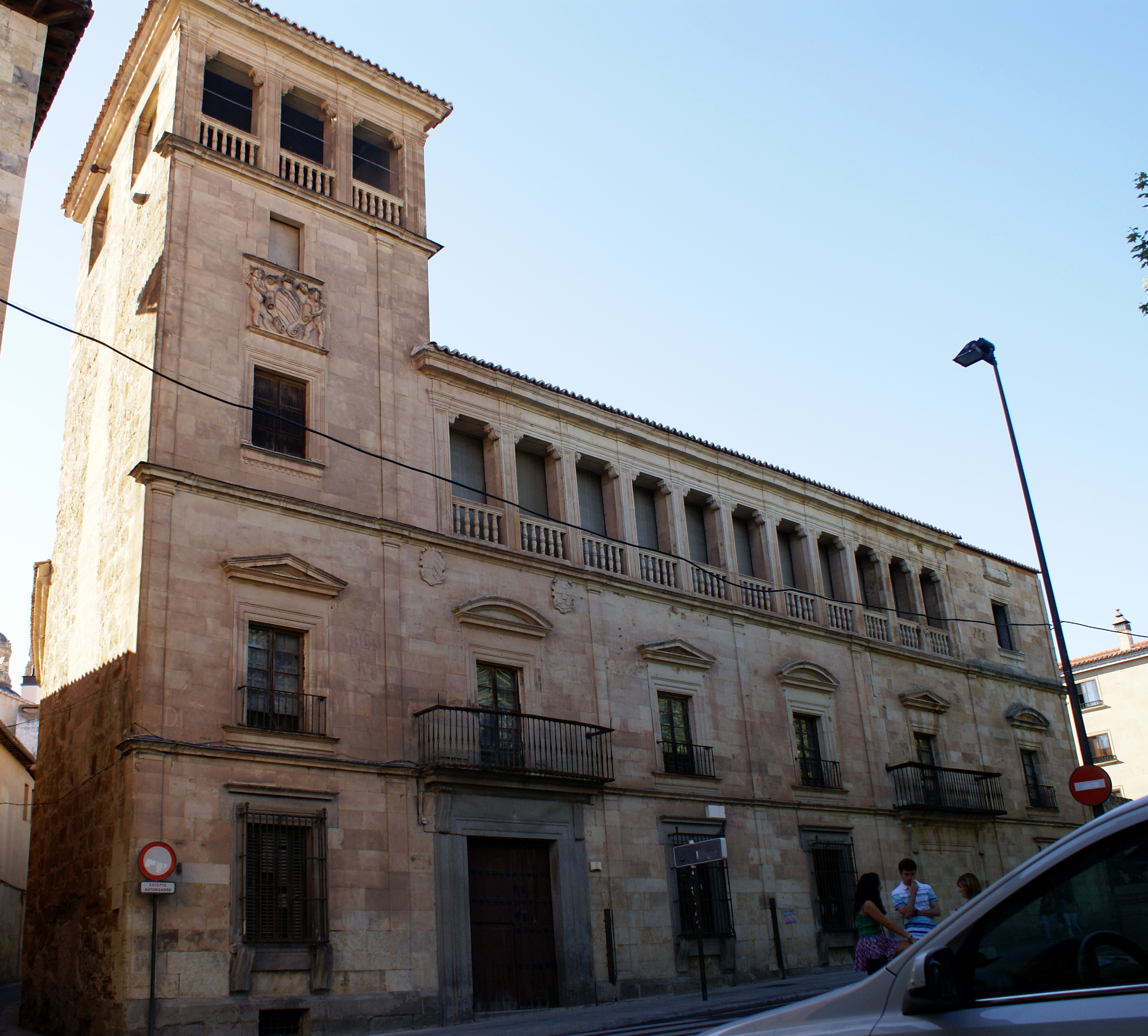
- Palacio de Orellana in Salamanca
- Interactive map of the Palacio de Orellana area

General information
- Type: Palace
- Architectural style: Renaissance with Mannerist influences
- Location: Salamanca, Castile and León, Spain
- Coordinates: 40.9650°N 5.6630°W
- Current tenants: Private ownership / Residential use
- Completed: 1576
- Owner: Private

Technical details
- Material: Stone masonry
- Floor count: 2–3 (historic structure)

Design and construction
- Architect: Juan Ribero de Rada (associated)

Palacio de Orellana is a historic palace in Salamanca, Spain. Located in the city's historic centre, it is considered an example of late Renaissance architecture in Spain, combining classical design with Mannerist elements.

== History ==
The palace was built in 1576 and has traditionally been linked to the patronage of Francisco Pereira de Anaya. The architect Juan Ribero de Rada is also associated with its construction.

== Heritage status ==
Palacio de Orellana was declared a Bien de Interés Cultural with monument status on 16 March 2000.

== See also ==
- Juan Ribero de Rada
- Salamanca
- Architecture of Spain
