= Juan Ribero de Rada =

Spanish architect (c. 1540–1600)

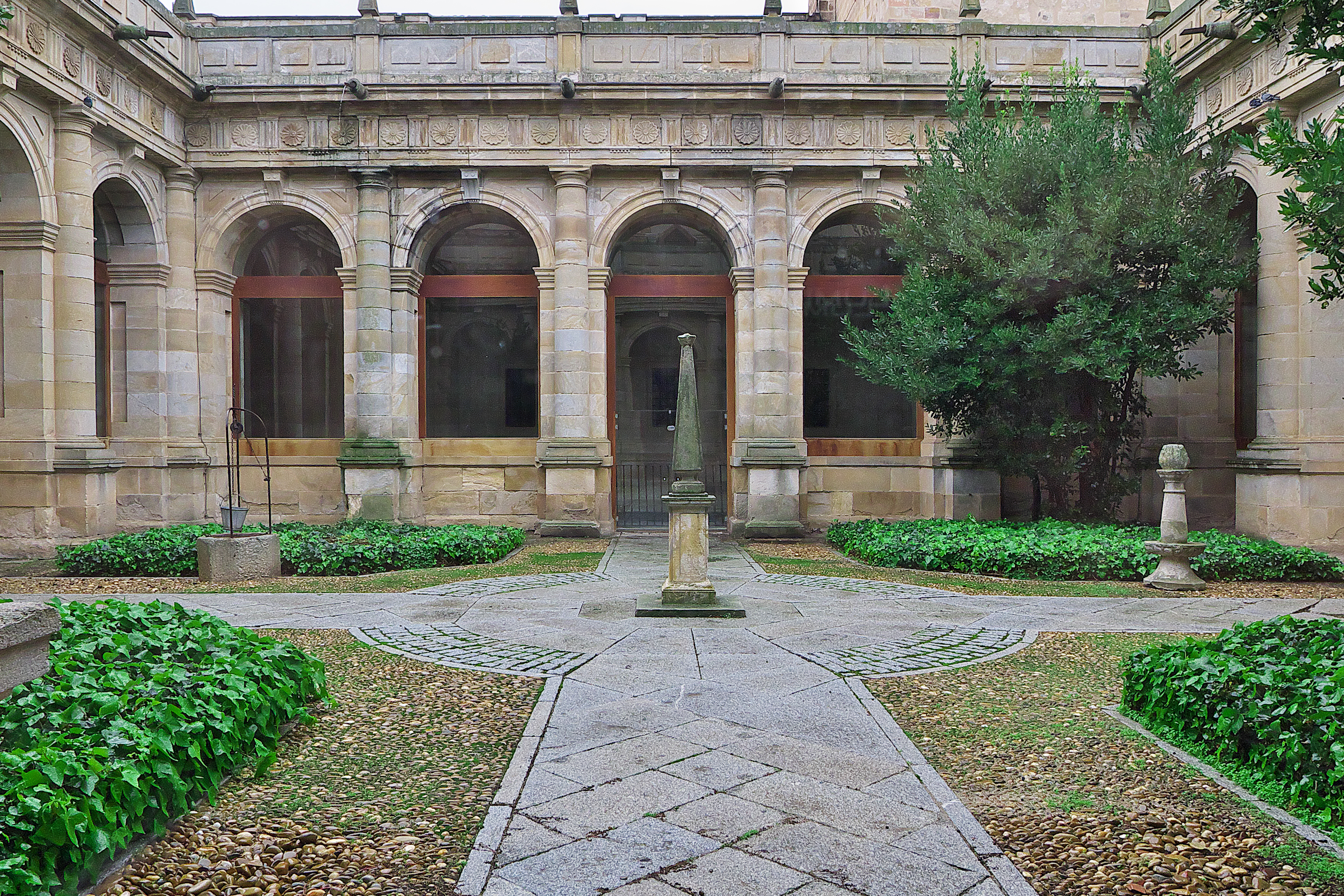
- Cloister of Zamora Cathedral, rebuilt under the direction of Juan Ribero de Rada
- Born: c. 1540; Rada, Cantabria, Crown of Castile
- Died: 1600; Salamanca, Crown of Castile
- Occupation: Architect
- Notable work: Zamora Cathedral cloister, Convento de San Esteban, Palacio de Orellana
- Style: Renaissance architecture / Classicism

Juan Ribero de Rada (c. 1540 – 1600), also known as Juan del Ribero Rada, was a Spanish architect and master mason connected with the Renaissance architecture and classical architectural forms in Castile and León during the late 16th century.

== Early life ==
Ribero de Rada was born in Rada, Cantabria in northern Spain the circle of Rodrigo Gil de Hontañón one of the most influential Spanish architects of the period.

== Career ==
He worked on a number of important religious and civil buildings in León, Zamora, Valladolid and Salamanca. He is mainly associated with the rebuilding of the cloister of Zamora Cathedral work at the Convento de San Esteban in Salamanca and participation in the Palacio de Orellana.

Scholars have described him as an important figure in the transition from late Gothic building traditions to a more classical architectural language in north-western Spain.

== See also ==
- Rodrigo Gil de Hontañón
- Spanish Renaissance
- Architecture of Spain
