= Juan de Álava =

Spanish architect

- Born: 1480; Larrinoa, Zigoitia, Álava, Spain
- Died: 1537 (aged 56–57); Salamanca, Spain

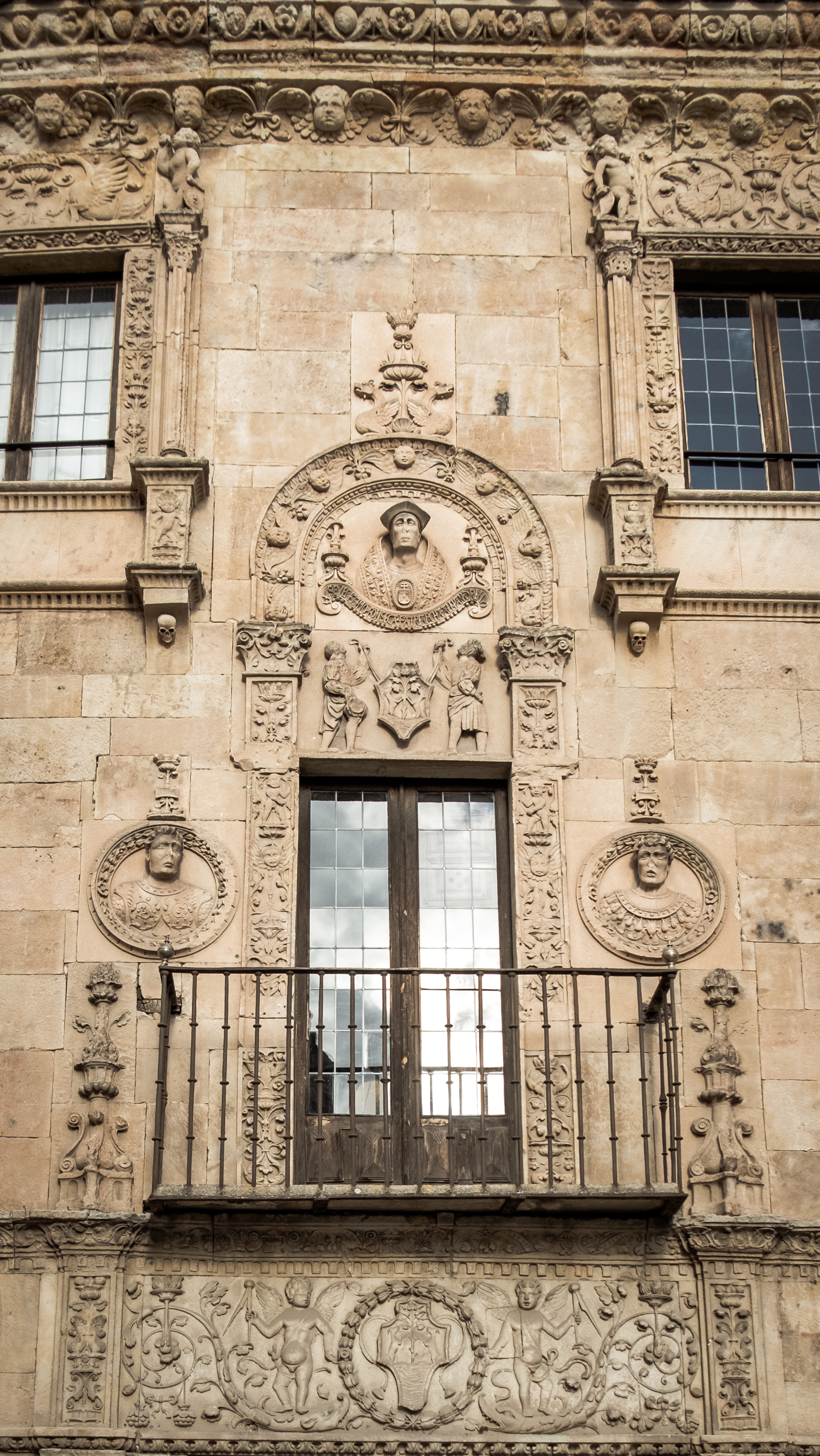
Casa de las Muertes in Salamanca

Juan de Álava (1480-1537) was a Spanish architect best known for his stonework produced in the Plateresque style.

== Life ==
Juan de Álva was born in 1480 in Larrinoa, a locality of Zigoitia, Álava to a family of stonemasons. In 1502, de Álva traveled to Italy where he became familiar with Italian Renaissance architecture.

de Álva worked primarily in the city of Salamanca, where many of his notable works are situated.

== Projects ==
- Casa de las Muertes (1500), Salamanca
- New Cathedral of Plasencia (1513)
- Convento de San Esteban, Salamanca (1524)
- Cloister of Santiago de Compostela Cathedral, Santiago de Compostela
- Chapel of the University of Salamanca, Salamanca (demolished), Salamanca
- Colegio Mayor de Santiago el Zebedeo (completed 1578), Salamanca
