= Colegio Mayor de Santiago el Zebedeo =

Historical edifice in Salamanca, Spain

Coordinates: 40°57′56″N 5°40′13″W

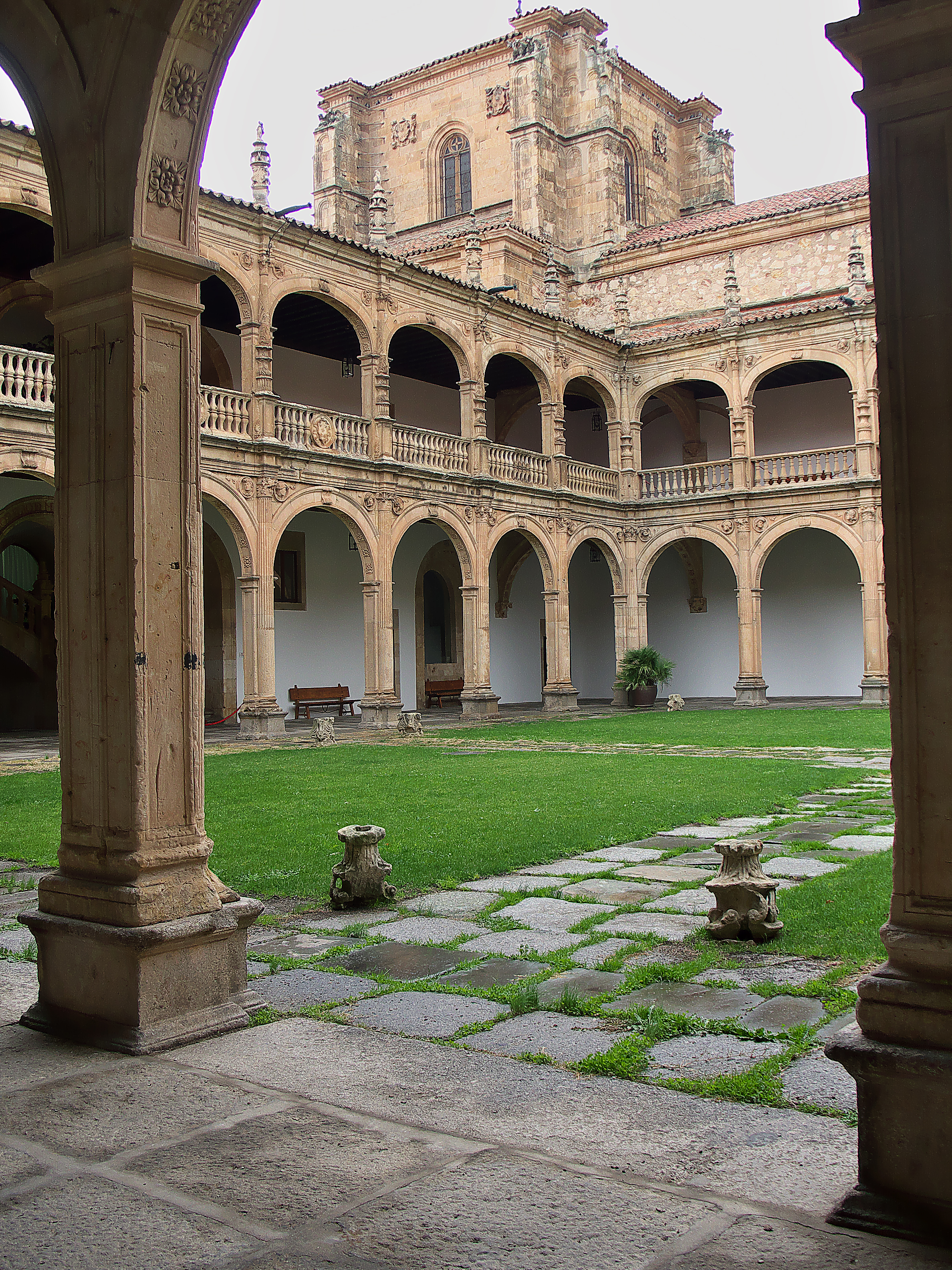
View of the inner cloister.

The Colegio Mayor de Santiago, el Zebedeo, Colegio del Arzobispo or Colegio Mayor de Fonseca is a historical edifice in Salamanca, Spain, founded in 1519 by Alonso de Fonseca, archbishop of Santiago de Compostela (hence its name), in order to provide Galician students with a college in which to study within the University of Salamanca. It is one of the Colegios Mayores of Salamanca and was later known as the Colegio de los Irlandeses or the Irish College.

== History ==
The Colegio Mayor of Santiago el Zebedeo, better known as the Colegio de Arzobispo Fonseca (which should not be confused with the Colegio de Arzobispo Fonseca of Santiago de Compostela), was one of the four Colleges of Salamanca (Spain ), was founded in 1519 by Alonso de Fonseca, archbishop of Santiago de Compostela, so that Galician students had a College to study at the University.

It was later known as the Colegio de los Irlandeses (College of the Irish) because the Colegio de San Patricio (College of St. Patrick), was founded in 1592, at the request of King Philip II, to house the students of Ireland who came to Salamanca due to the English persecution of Catholics in their homeland.

== The building ==
It is the only one of the buildings of the old Salamanca colleges that is preserved. The architects were Diego Siloe, Rodrigo Gil de Hontañón, and Juan de Álava. The building was completed in 1578. The building, of conventual type, is organized around a cloister. It has a relatively simple facade, in which the only decoration was on the facade. Above the door was an image of the apostle James at the Battle of Clavijo. The chapel contained an altarpiece by Alonso Berruguete.

The building was declared an Asset of Cultural Interest in 1931.

== Later uses ==
With the closing of the colleges in 1798, the Archbishop Fonseca College became a General Hospital in 1801. With the brief restoration of the collegiate institution by Ferdinand VII the school was reopened in 1817. Three years later the school was again closed. It was not in operation for a long time, closed definitively in 1837, and then was occupied by the Irish.

The Irish students left in 1936 with the outbreak of the Spanish Civil War and the building was requisitioned by General Franco. From June 1937 to May 1939 it was occupied by the German embassy. With the opening of seminaries in Ireland, there was less need of the facility in Salamanca, which was in poor repair. The Irish bishops negotiated turning over the premises to the University of Salamanca. For over 360 years, until it closed in 1952, the college welcomed generations of young Irish trainee priests.

It is currently used as a residence for postgraduates and for cultural events, with the name of Colegio Arzobispo Fonseca. In summer the concerts and theatrical performances under the cultural program "Las Noches del Fonseca", sponsored by the University and the Town are celebrated in its courtyard. The hostel is affiliated with the Postgraduate Center of the University of Salamanca.

== See also ==
- Irish College at Salamanca
