= Convento de San Esteban, Salamanca =

Monastery in Salamanca, Spain

Coordinates: 40°57′38″N 5°39′47″W

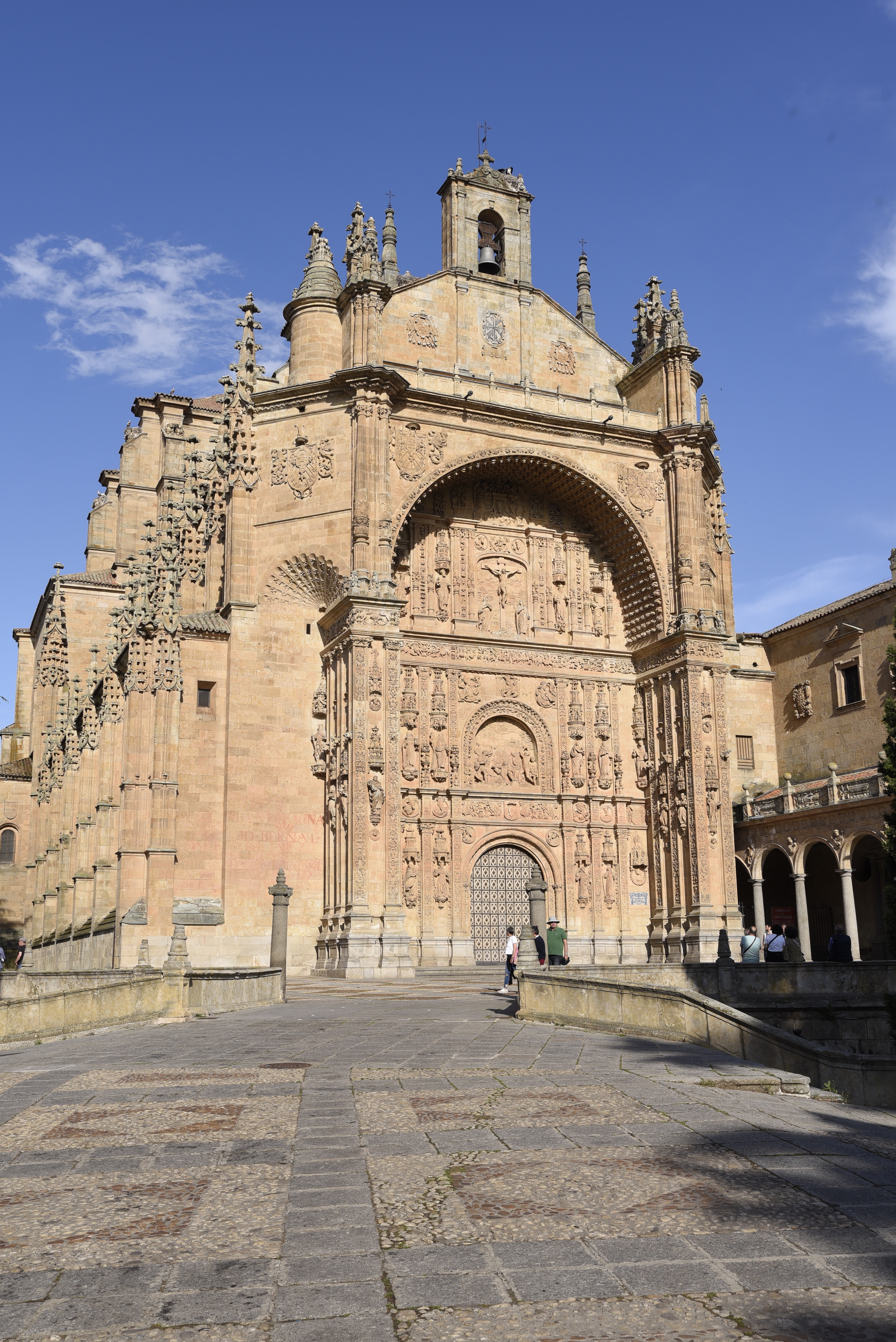
West façade of the Convento de San Esteban, built between 1524-1610.

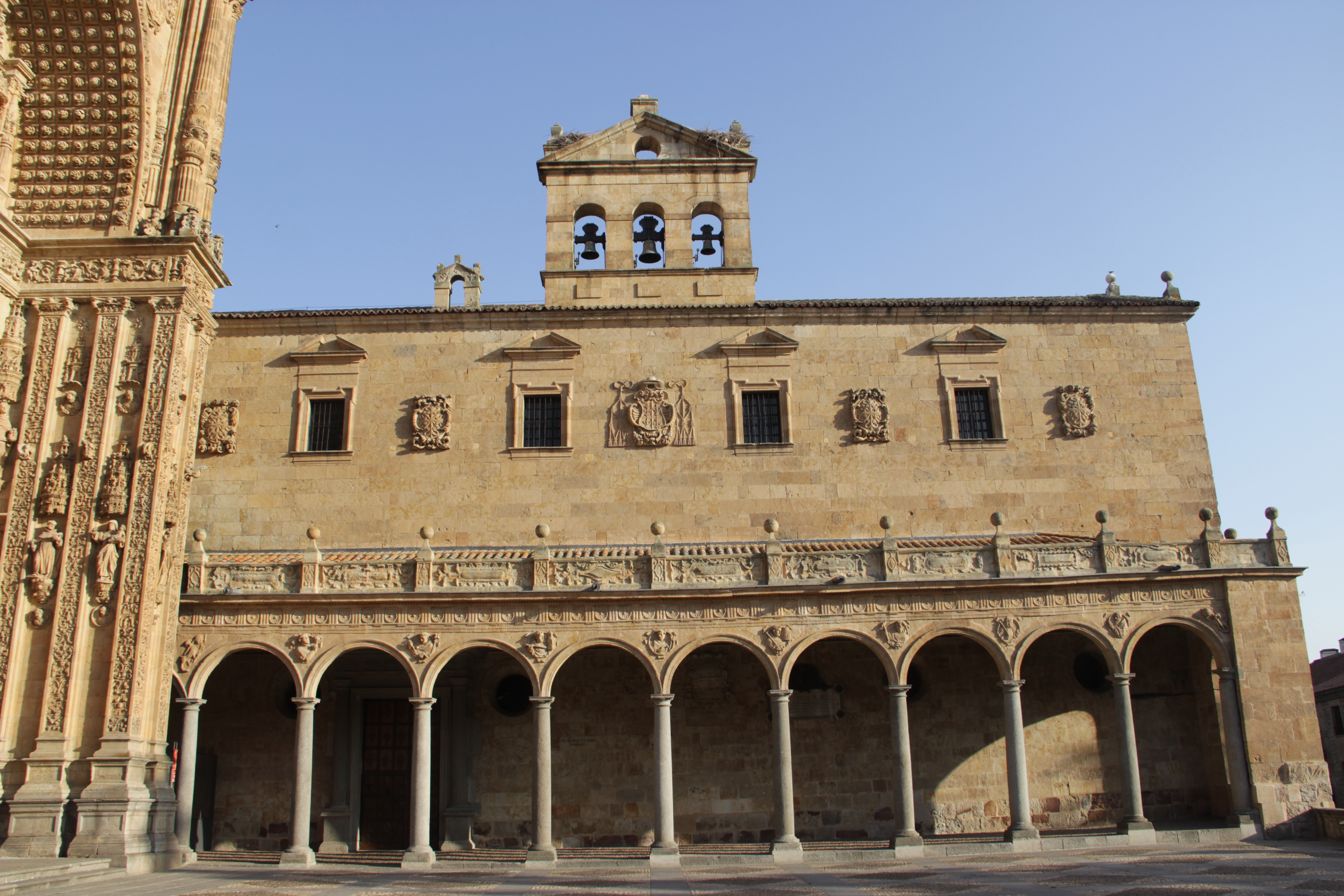
The Portico of the convent

The Convento de San Esteban is a Dominican monastery of Plateresque style, situated in the Plaza del Concilio de Trento (Square of the Council of Trent) in Salamanca, Castile and León, Spain.

== History ==
The Dominicans settled in Salamanca between 1255 and 1256. On the present site of the convent, occupied by the parish church of San Esteban, they built the primitive convent, later destroyed to build the present one, in 1524 on the initiative of Cardinal Friar Juan Álvarez de Toledo.

Its construction lasted until 1610, with the participation of Friar Martín de Santiago, Rodrigo Gil de Hontañón, Juan Ribero de Rada and Pedro Gutiérrez. However, the plan and design are by Juan de Álava, who began the work in 1524, as evidenced by the preserved plan of this same master. Rodrigo Gil de Hontañón was in charge of the transept with the dome and the chancel. Although it is considered an excellent example of the Plateresque style, the length of its construction phases explains the mixture of styles ranging from the final Gothic to the Baroque, a style that is not very noticeable in its architecture but is well present in the main altarpiece by José Benito de Churriguera.

According to tradition, Christopher Columbus stayed in this convent (actually in the previous one, destroyed to build this one) when he went to Salamanca to defend before the geographers of the University the possibility of reaching the Indies by sailing to the West.

During the Counter-Reformation it was an important center where the Dominican fathers who founded the School of Salamanca were forged, with Francisco de Vitoria at the head, and help was given to Saint Teresa of Ávila and Saint Ignatius of Loyola.

== Art and Architecture ==
=== Facade ===
The facade is composed of the front of the church and the portico of access to the convent that forms a right angle with it.

The front of the church is one of the most beautiful examples of Plateresque. It is conceived as a portal-altarpiece forming a triumphal arch under whose half-barrel vault the abundant decoration characteristic of the style is displayed. In its center is represented the martyrdom of Saint Stephen and above a Calvary, reliefs both executed by Juan Antonio Ceroni at the beginning of the 17th century.

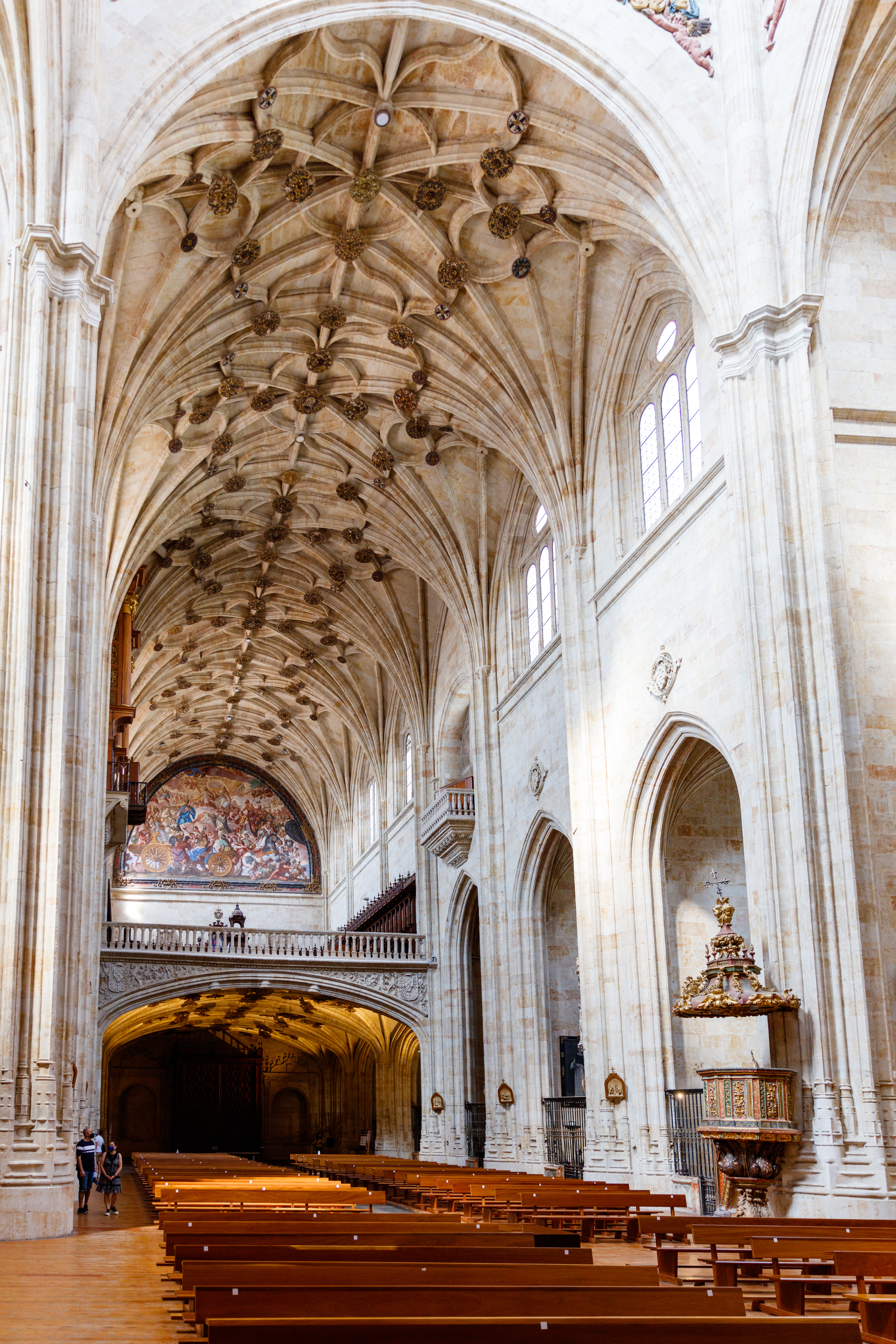
The central nave, the painting Triumph of the Church by Antonio Palomino can be seen in the background.

The portico, composed of semicircular arches, is inspired by Italian Renaissance loggias, contrasting its sparse ornamentation with the decorative exuberance of the church façade. It was made by Juan Ribero de Rada between 1590 and 1592, but the medallions of the spandrels are the work of sculptor Martín Rodríguez.

=== Church ===
Its construction was begun by the architect Juan de Álava in 1524 and was followed by Friar Martín de Santiago who was succeeded by Rodrigo Gil de Hontañón, being consecrated in 1610.

It has a Latin cross plan and a single nave, with chapels between the buttresses and the choir raised on a segmental arch at the foot of the church. The styles present are late Gothic from the transept to the feet, and Renaissance that includes the transept, the dome and the presbytery. It is 14.50 m wide, 27 m high in the nave and 44 m in the dome. In the choir stand out the painting of the Triumph of the Church, by Antonio Palomino, and a Virgin and Child, by Peter Paul Rubens.

=== Main altarpiece ===
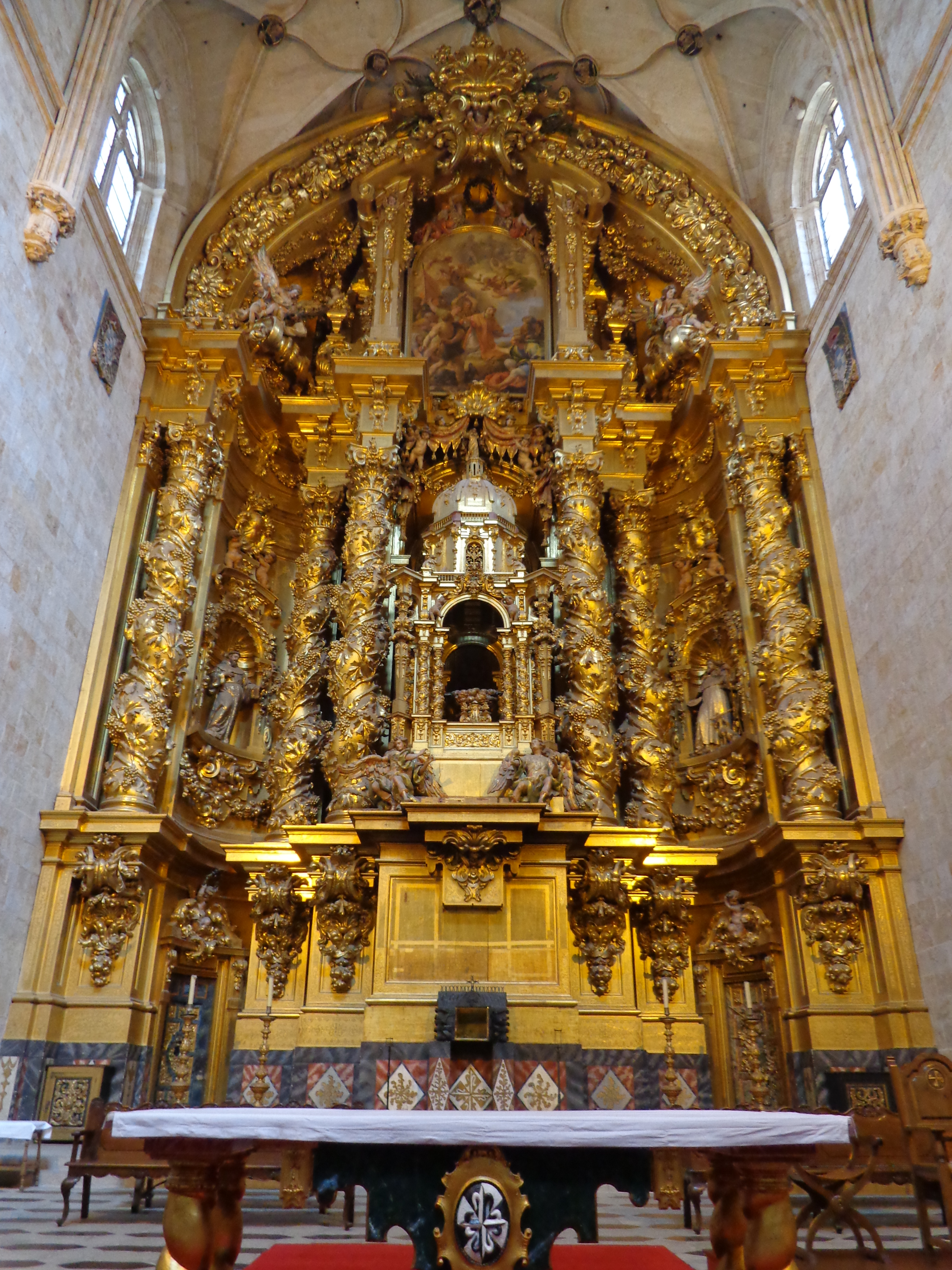
Main altarpiece

Work of José Benito de Churriguera, which tops the head of the church. Six large solomonic columns, covered with vegetal decoration, run along the first body, in the center of which is the central tabernacle conceived as a small temple, flanked by a pair of columns on each side; between these and those of the two at the ends are two niches that shelter the sculptures of Saint Dominic and Saint Francis of Assisi, attributed to the author of the altarpiece.

The second body has as center and top a painting by Claudio Coello whose theme is the martyrdom of St. Stephen.

Everything is gilded and covered with decoration, giving rise to a monumental baroque altarpiece that is typically Spanish.

=== Sacristy ===
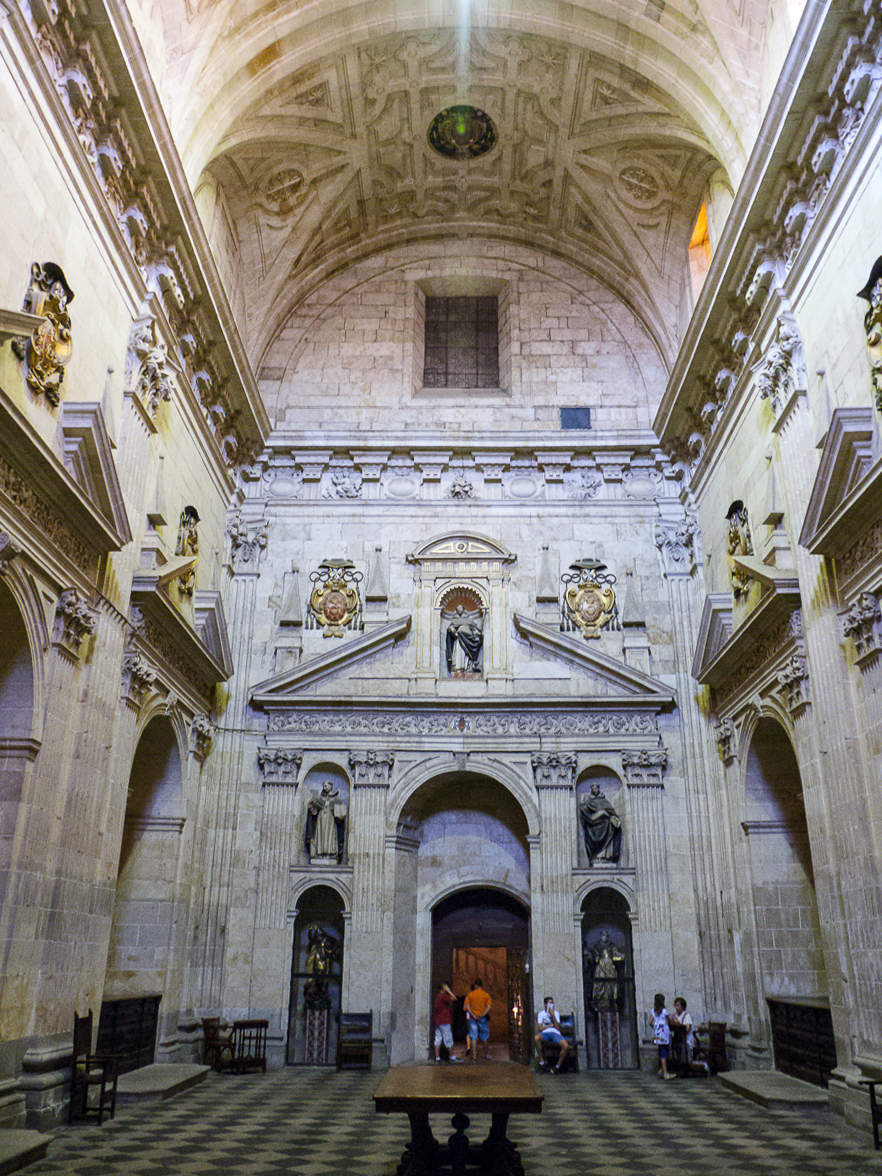
Sacristy

Built in the 17th century under the patronage of Fray Pedro de Herrera Suárez, bishop of Tuy, by the architects Alonso Sardiña and Juan Moreno. Of classical taste, the walls are covered by Corinthian order pilasters with curved and triangular split pediments topped with pyramids. The frieze is decorated with corbels and various allegories.

The founder built the sacristy to make it also his burial place. Thus, in an elevated niche on the left side is his praying effigy in polychrome stone, the work of Antonio de Paz. Of the same author are the images of the Assumption of the Virgin, St. Peter and St. Paul that are in the headwall, presided over by an earlier Christ known as Jesús de la Promesa.

=== Cloister and chapters ===
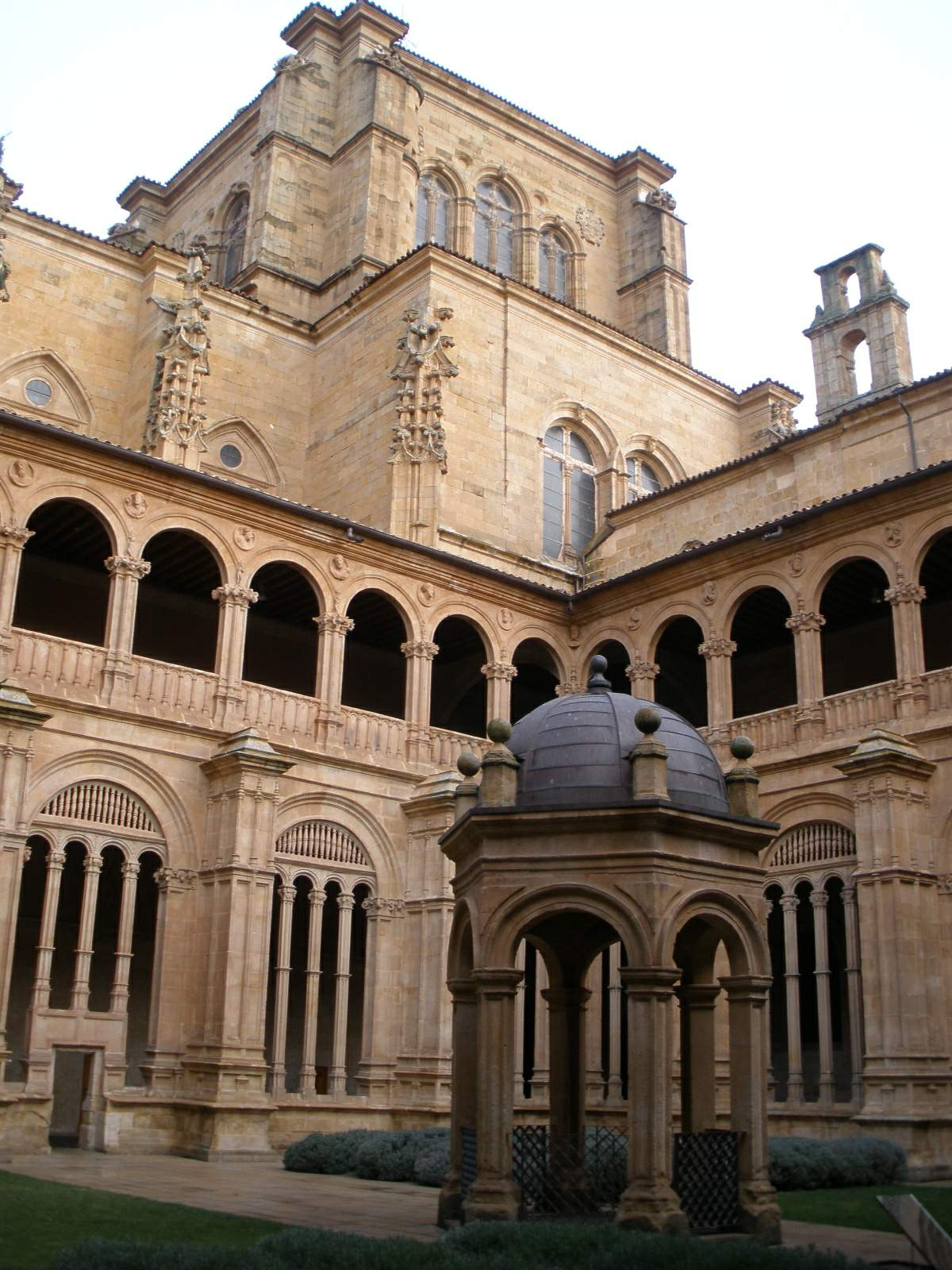
Cloister de los Reyes

The main cloister, called "de procesiones" or de los Reyes, is the work of Friar Martín de Santiago, a religious of the convent. On the first floor it mixes Gothic and Renaissance elements. The arches that separate it from the garden are semicircular, Renaissance, although treated in the Gothic style since they are divided by three mulliones. The vaults of its four crujías are ribbed, characteristic of the Gothic style. In the center of the garden there is a small shrine.

On the upper floor the roof is a simple wooden artesonado, the galleries being opened by means of forty semicircular arches, which rest on pilasters whose capitals are decorated with grotesques and other motifs.

The first floor leads to the "Chapters". The "Old Chapter", dark, modest and austere, dates from the 14th century, with works in the following centuries. One of its parts is the chapel, in the highest part and where the most prominent members of the convent were buried, such as Francisco de Vitoria or Domingo de Soto. The other religious were buried in the lower part and the friars sat on the benches attached to the walls during their meetings. The "new Chapter", larger, more monumental and illuminated than the old one, dates from the 17th century, resembling in its layout the Sacristy, which is accessed through the start of the Stairway of Soto.

=== Staircase of Soto ===
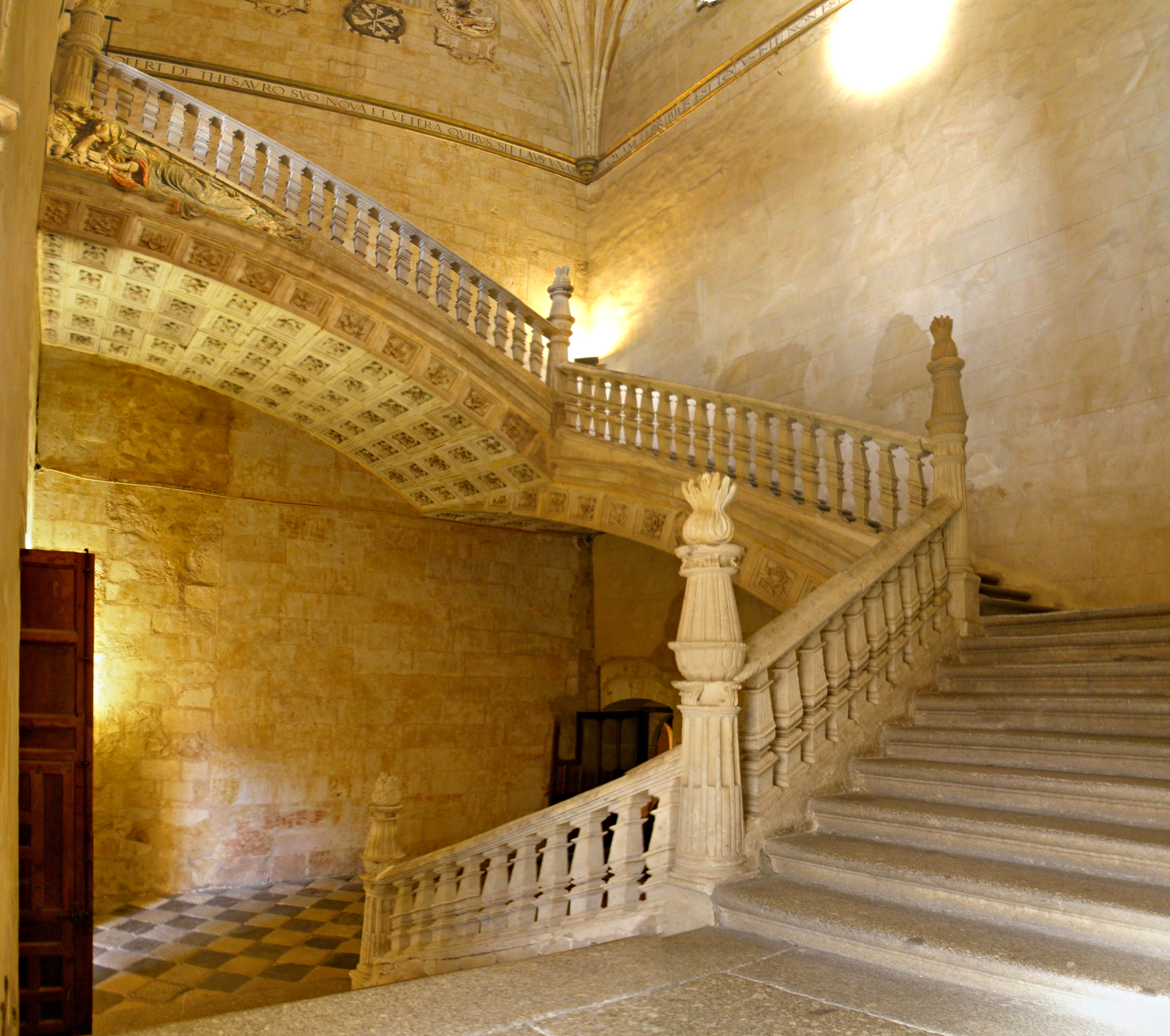
The Staircase of Soto, designed by Rodrigo Gil de Hontañón between 1553 and 1556.

It was built between 1553 and 1556. Its name is due to the patronage of Friar Domingo de Soto, professor at the University of Salamanca (belonging to the School of Salamanca) and confessor to Charles V, Holy Roman Emperor. The author was the architect Rodrigo Gil de Hontañón, who used a new and revolutionary technique, since it only rests on the walls, cantilevered, without other supports, creating a quite diaphanous space that seems to hold miraculously, and that allows the transit from the lower part of the cloister to the upper part. Its decoration is made up of flowered coffers and a polychrome relief in its upper section showing Mary Magdalene.

=== Sepulchre of the Grand Duke of Alba ===
Grand Duke of Alba died in Tomar, a town near Lisbon, on December 11, 1582, at the age of seventy-four.

His remains were initially transferred to Alba de Tormes, where he was buried in the Convent of San Leonardo. In 1619 they were transferred to the Convento de San Esteban, where since 1983 they rest in a chapel of the convent that contains a mausoleum designed by Chueca Goitia and that was paid for by the Diputación Provincial de Salamanca.

=== Areas reserved for the monastic community ===
In the area that cannot be visited at present because it is reserved for the community, there are two more cloisters. The first of these, known as the "Columbus cloister", is so called because, according to tradition, it was here that the discoverer held talks with the friars about his plans. It dates from the end of the 15th century, but its layout is simple, with semicircular arches resting on robust and simple capitals; it has a baroque window at the back. The other cloister, called "Los Aljibes cloister", has lowered arches and a decorative austerity marked by empty spaces and smooth surfaces that contrasts with the decorative exuberance present in other parts of the monument.

== Institutions ==
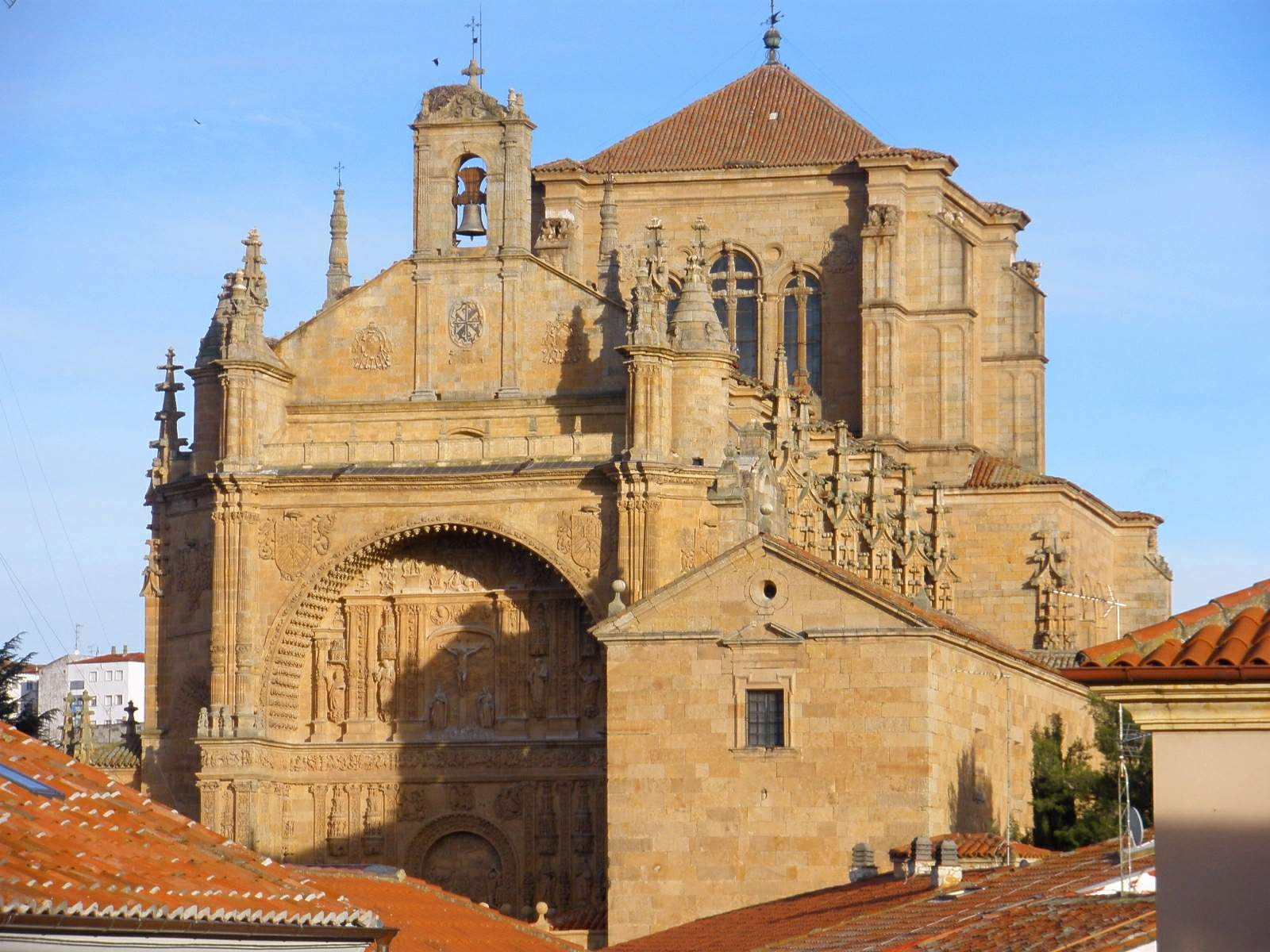
The roof

=== Faculty of Theology ===
The monastery houses the Pontifical Theological Faculty of St. Stephen, founded in 1947, successor to the General Study of Theology which was set up in San Esteban in 1222. Activities of the Faculty include the Conversations of San Esteban, the San Esteban School of Theology and the St. Thomas Aquinas Internet School of Theology at www.fatse.org. It also has its own publishing house, Editorial San Esteban.

=== Guilds ===
San Esteban is also the canonical seat of the Dominican Fraternity of Holy Christ of the Good Death which makes its penitential procession in Salamanca's Holy Week at dawn on Good Friday, and the Royal and Pontifical Sacrament Confraternity of Mary, Mother of God of the Rosary and St. Pius V fraternity of glory, restarted recently after years of inactivity.

== Gallery ==
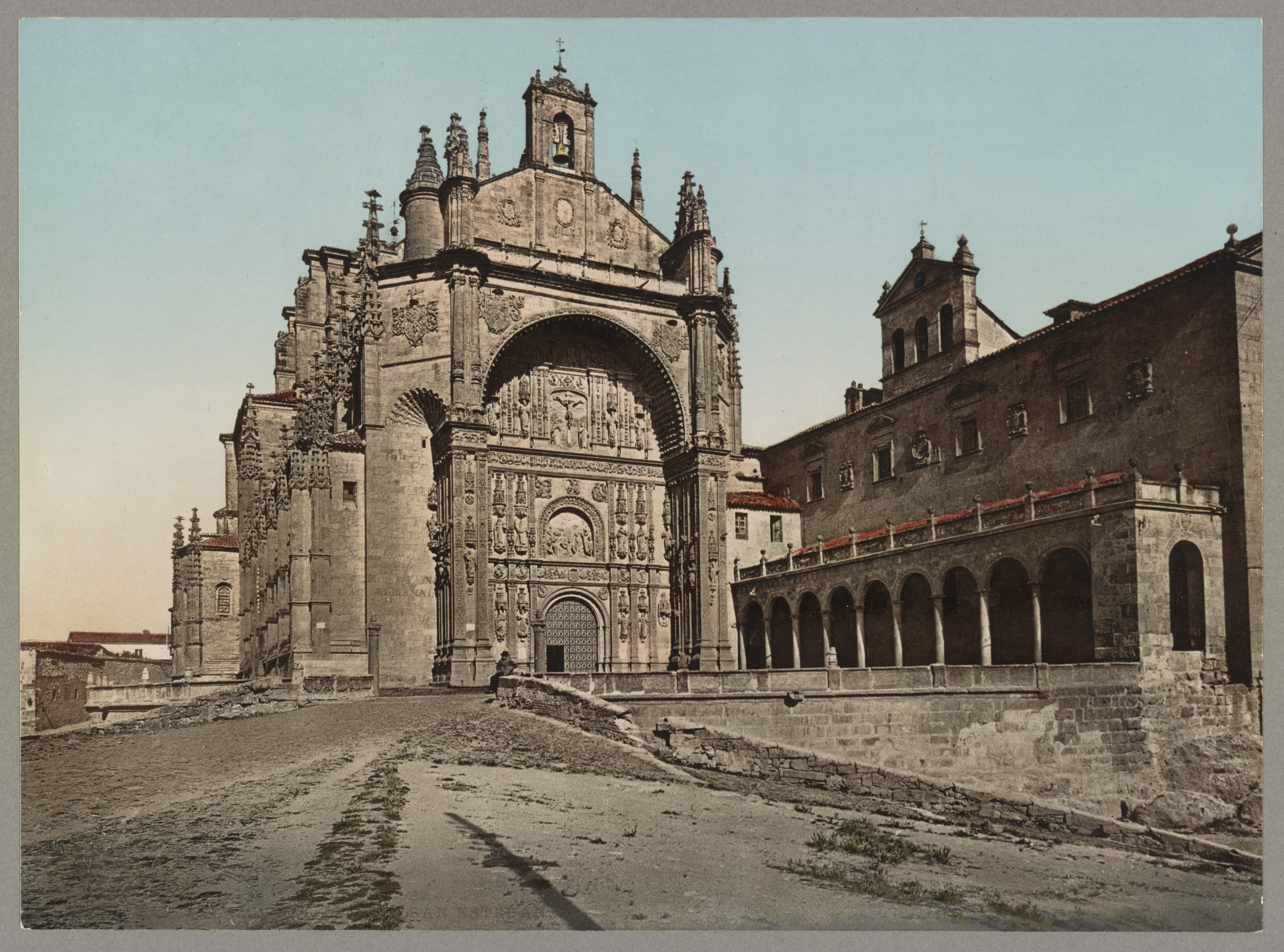
Convento de San Esteban in 1890. Library of Congress.

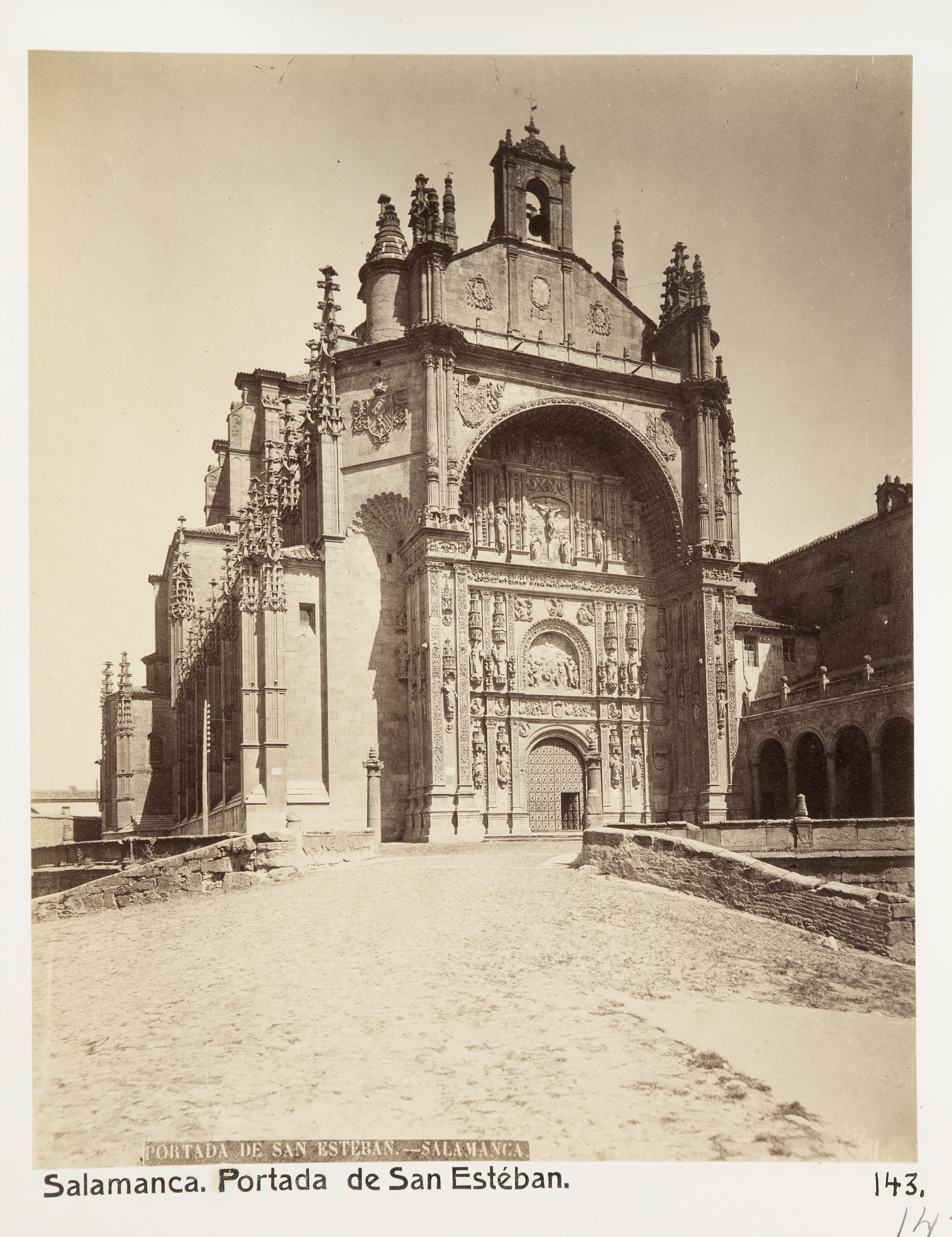
Convento de San Esteban in 1895 by Jenny Bergensten. Hallwyl Museum.

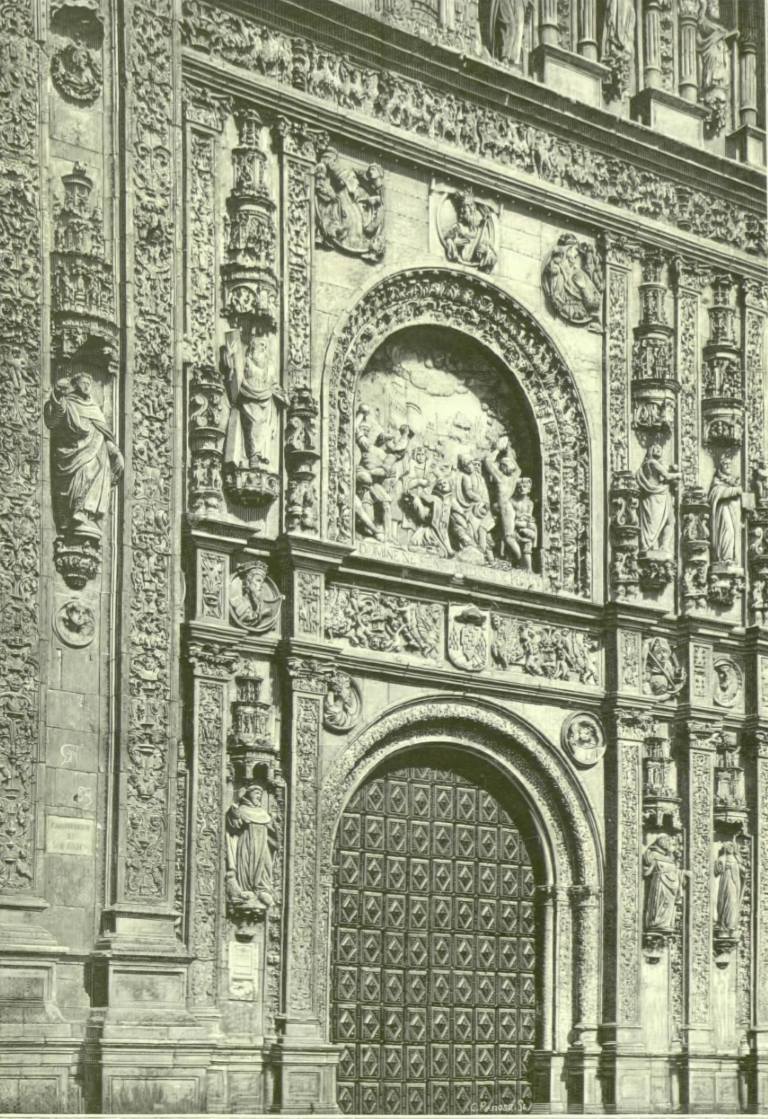
Façade of the convent in 1892 by La Ilustración Española y Americana.

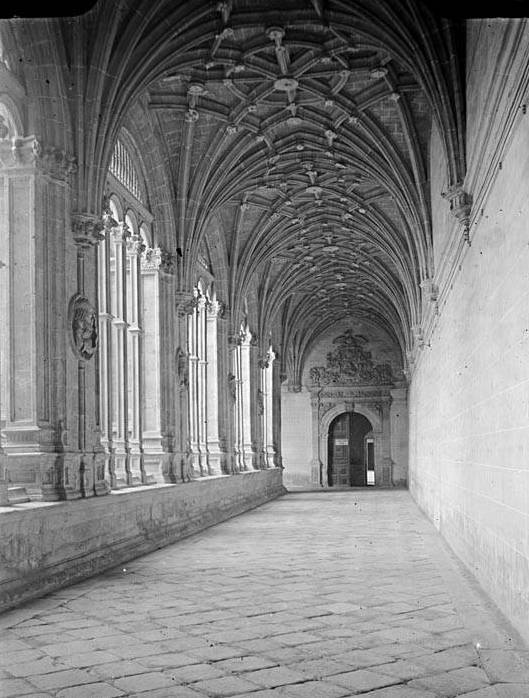
Cloister of Los Reyes between 1880-1926, photo by Joaquim Morelló. Memòria Digital de Catalunya.

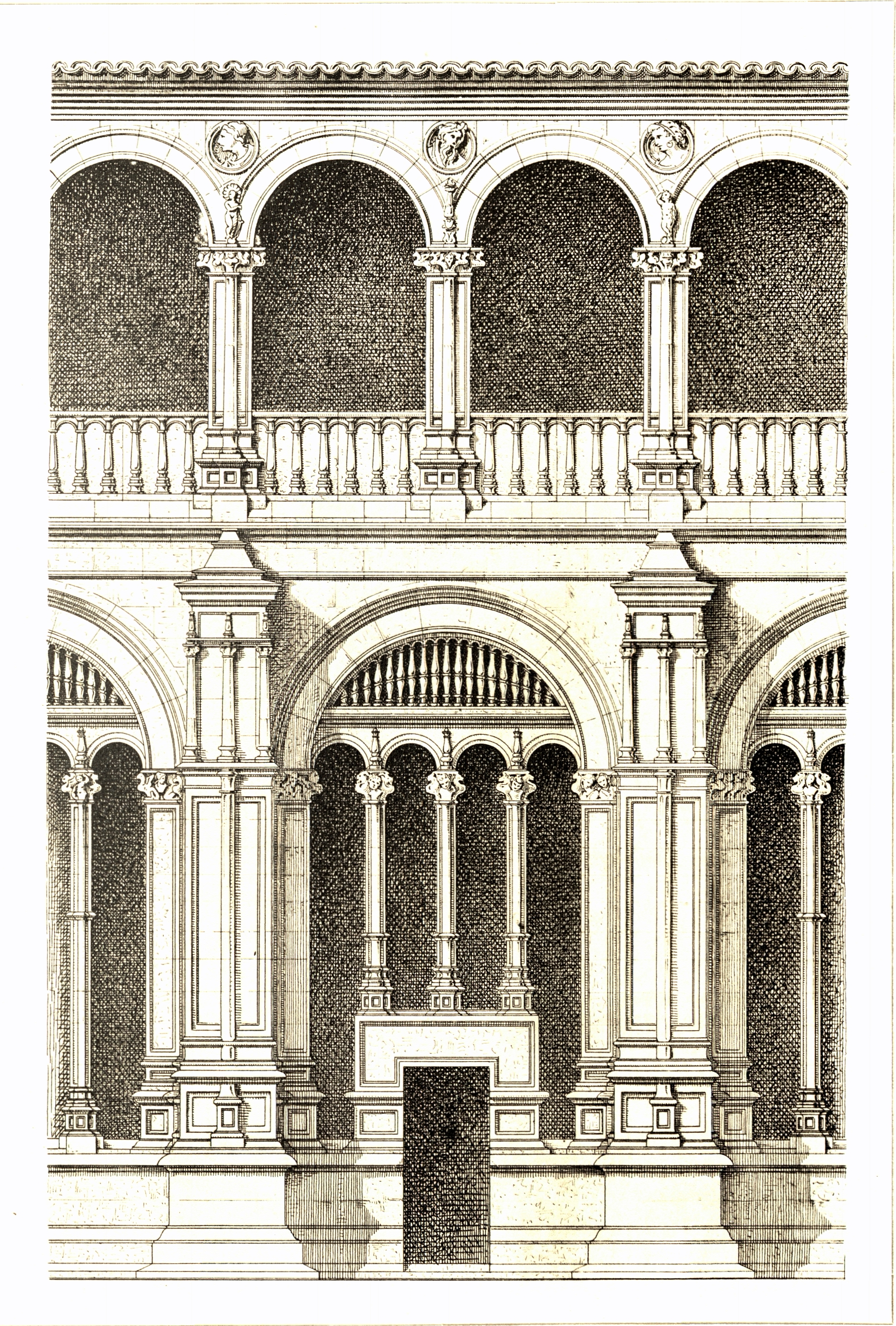
Cloister of the Convento in 1888 by Constantin Uhde.

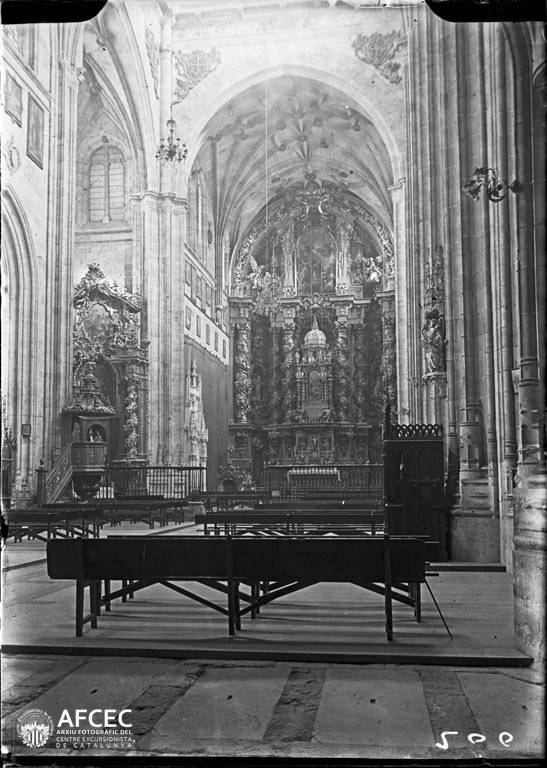
Main altarpiece of the Convento de San Esteban in 1880-1926. Memòria Digital de Catalunya.

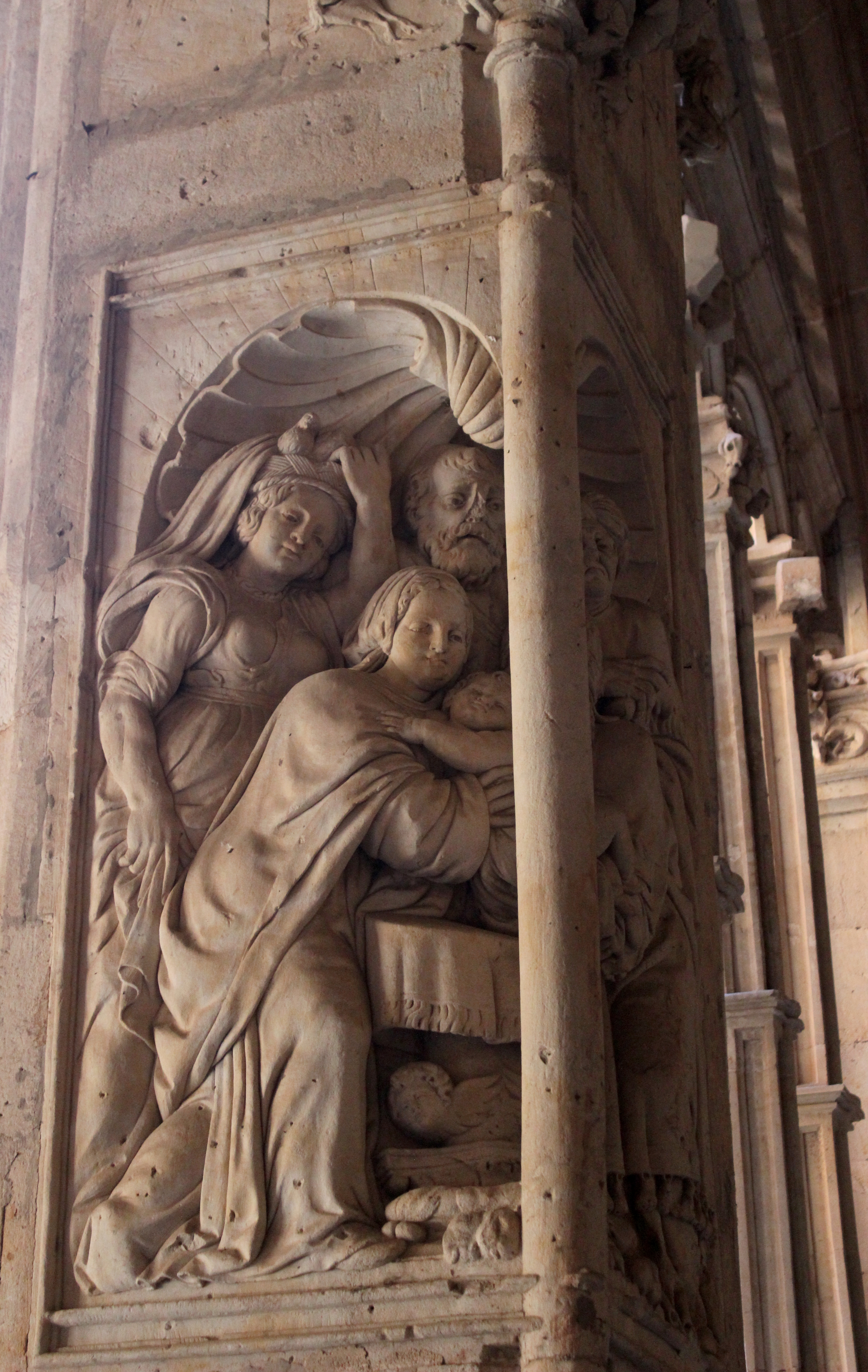
Presentation of St. Stephen in the temple, in one of the corners of the cloister.

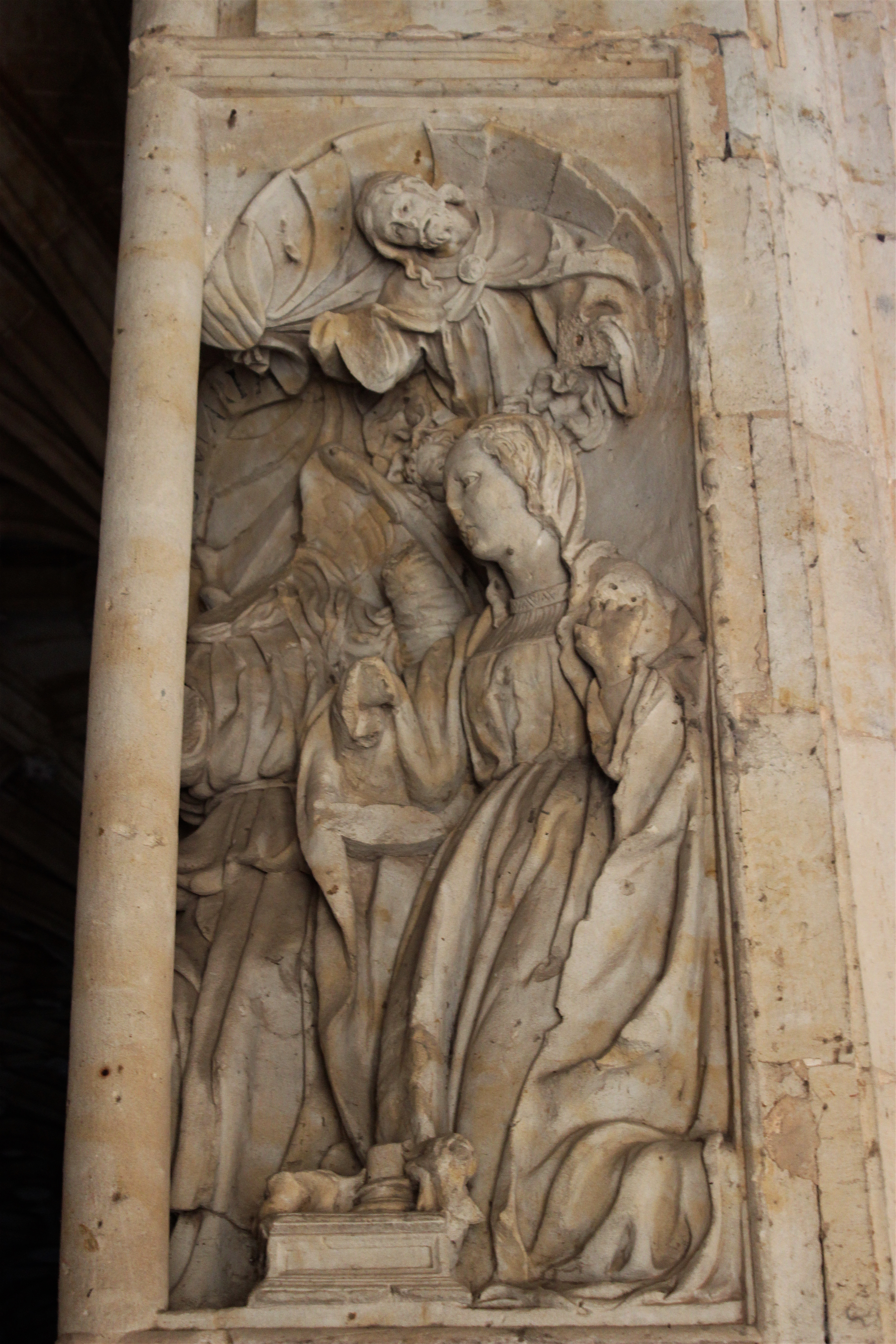
Annunciation of the Virgin, in one of the corners of the cloister.

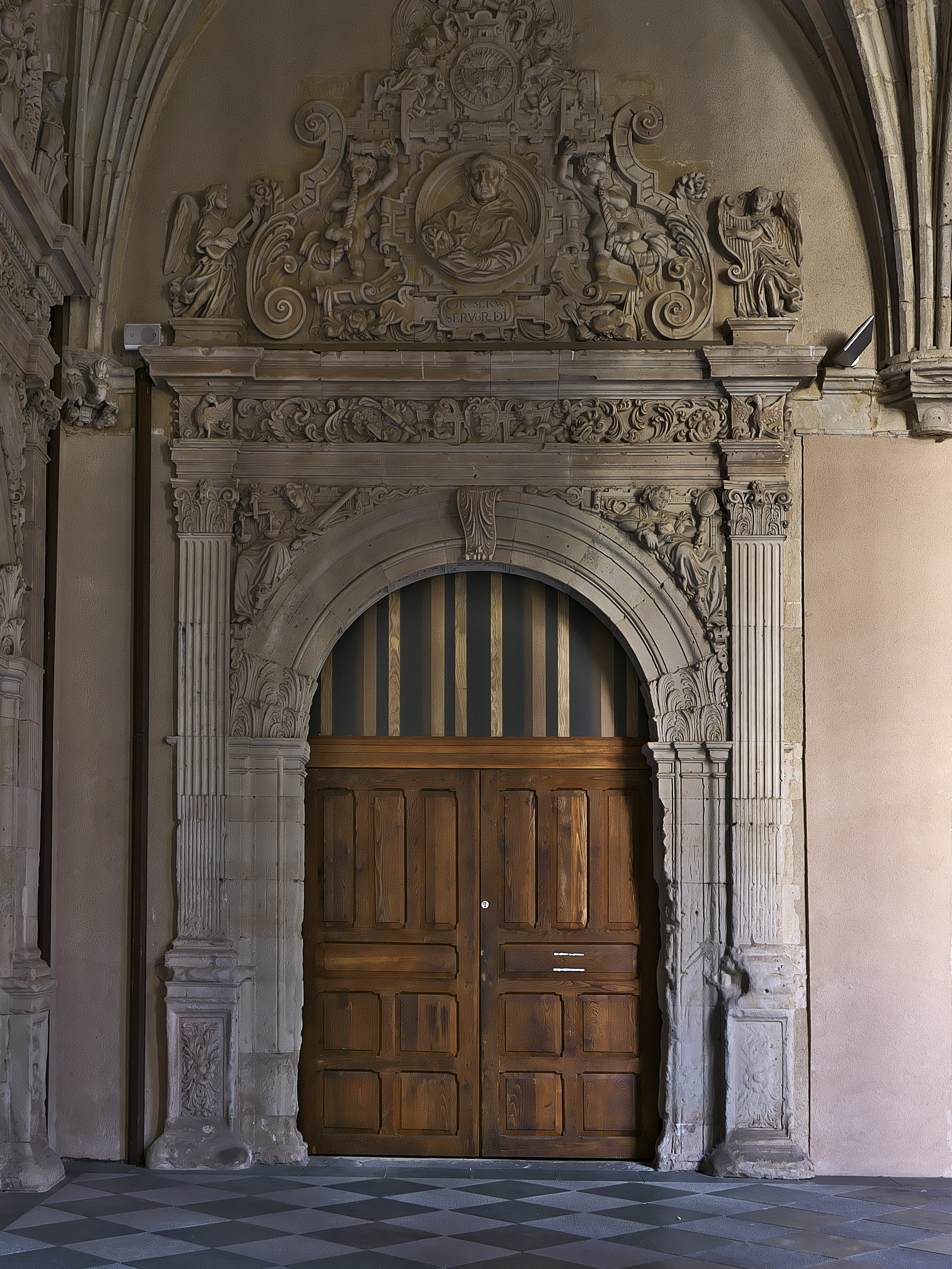
Portal of San Gregorio Magno

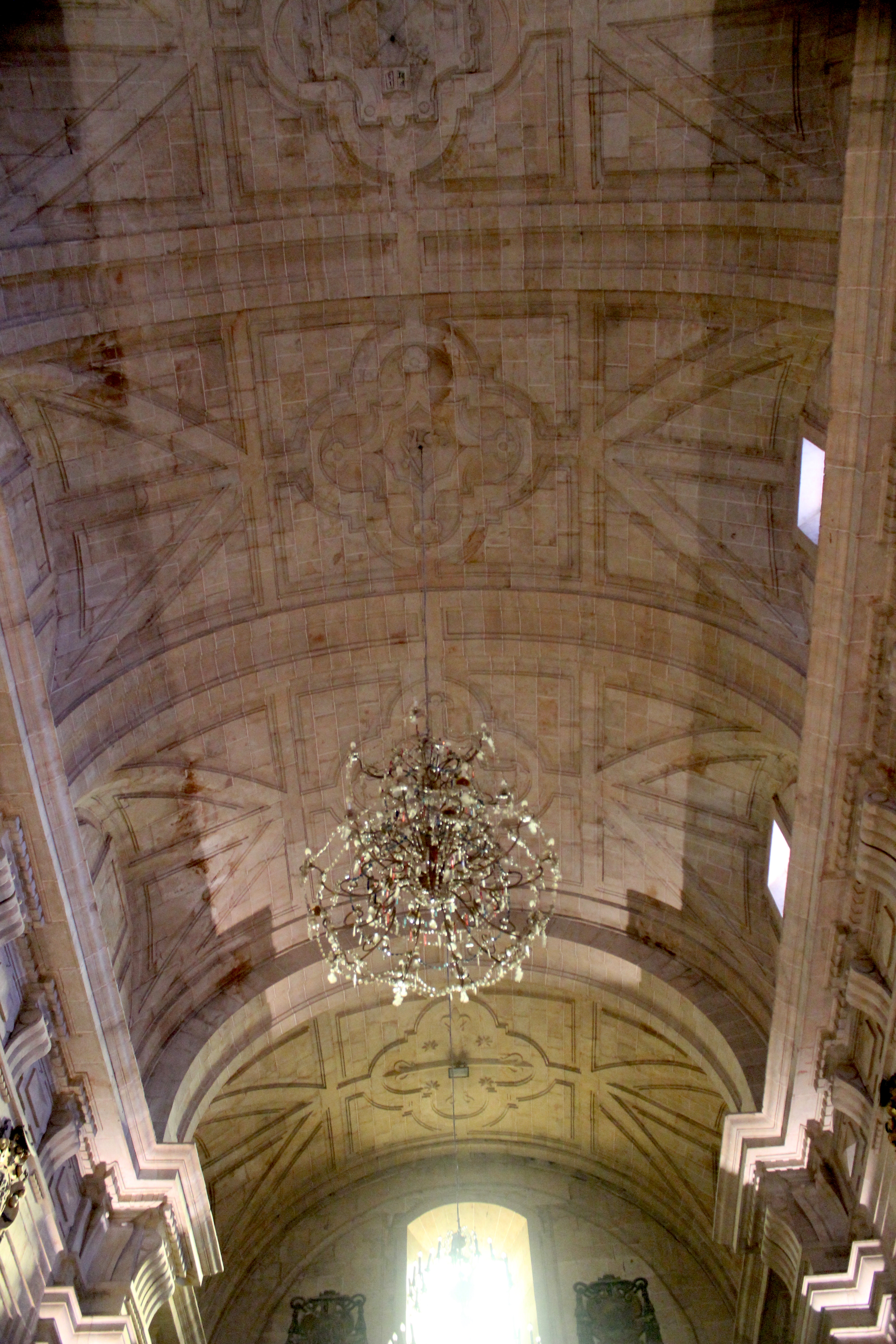
Roof of the chapterhouse

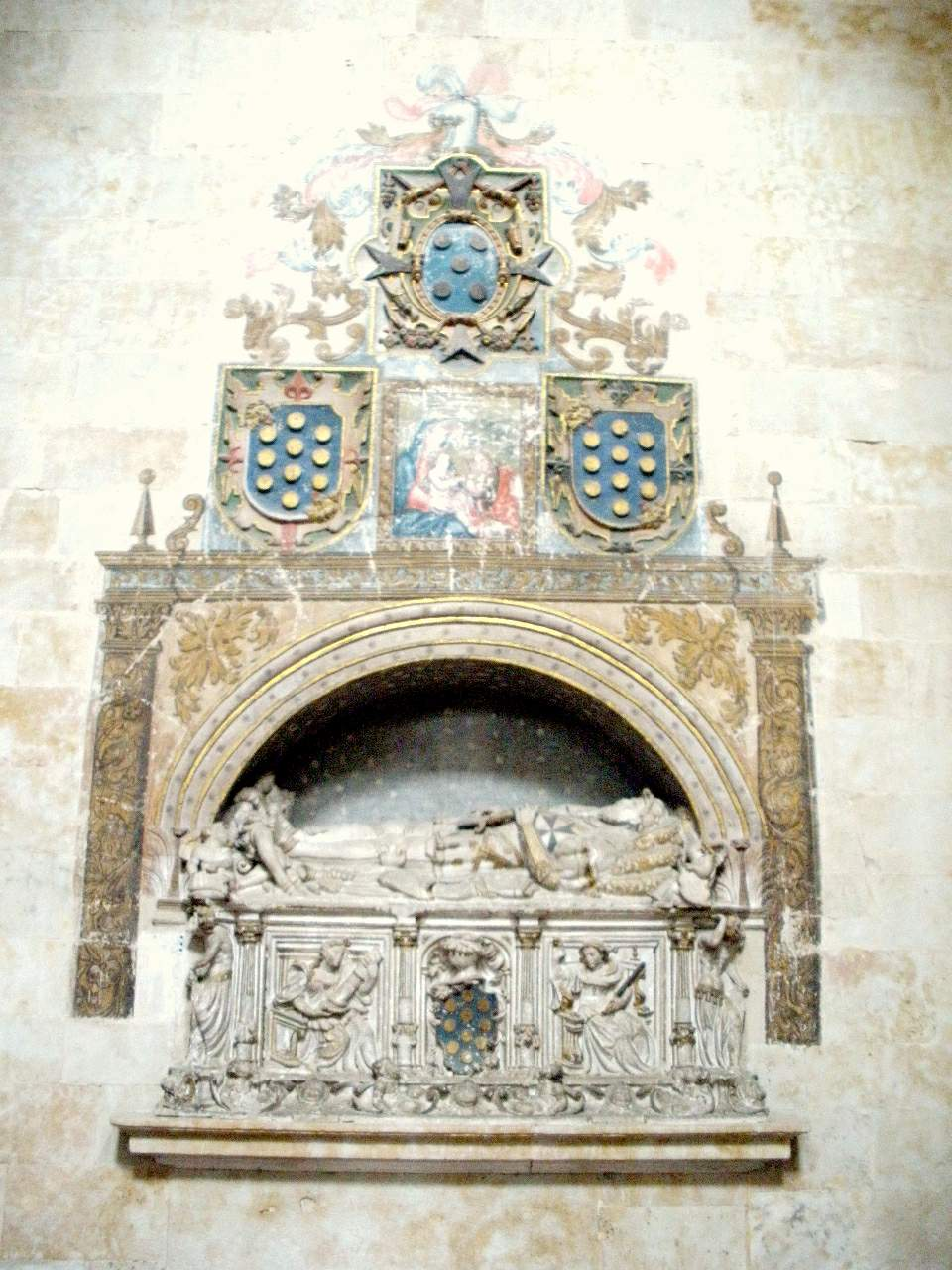
Capilla Funeraria de los Paz

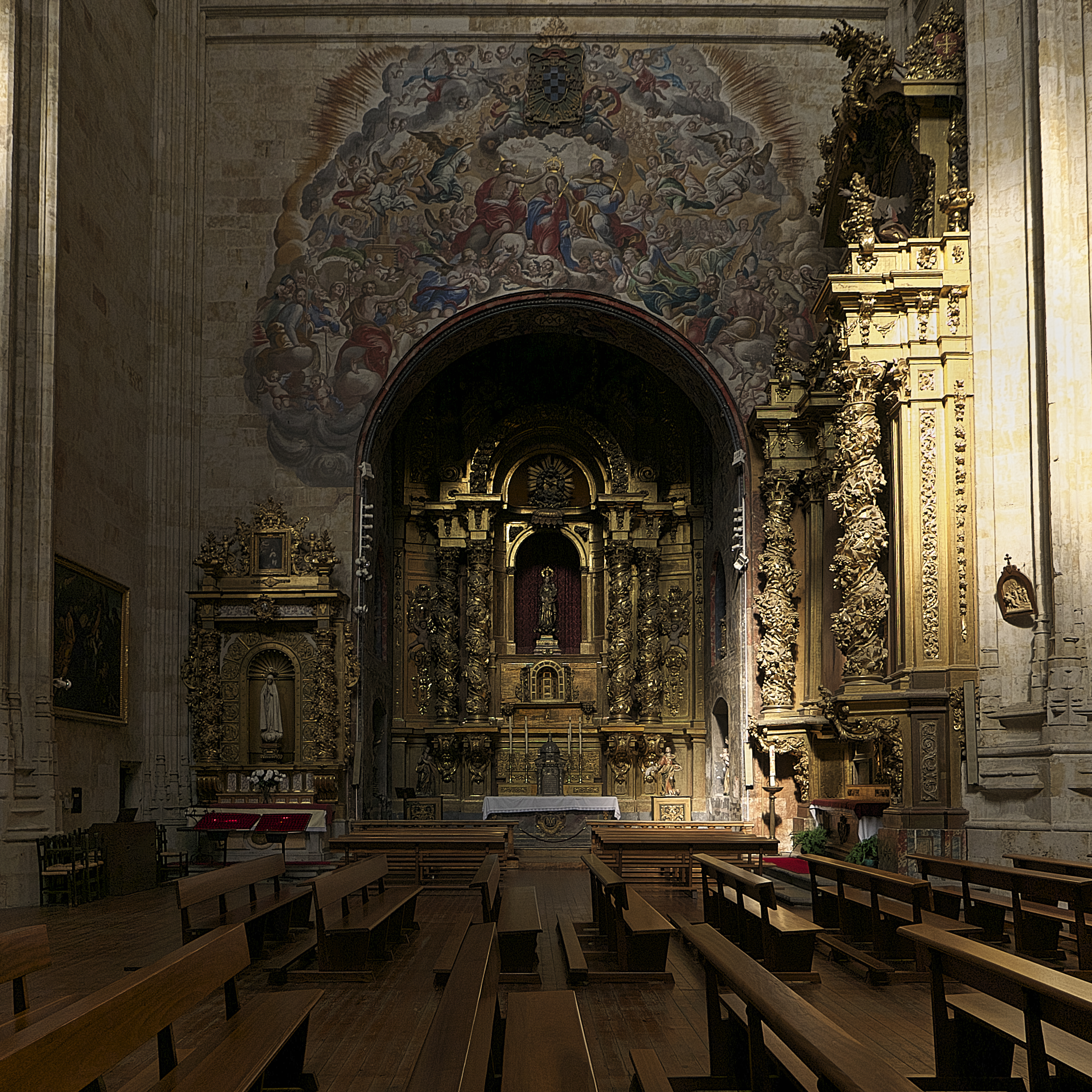
Capilla del Rosario

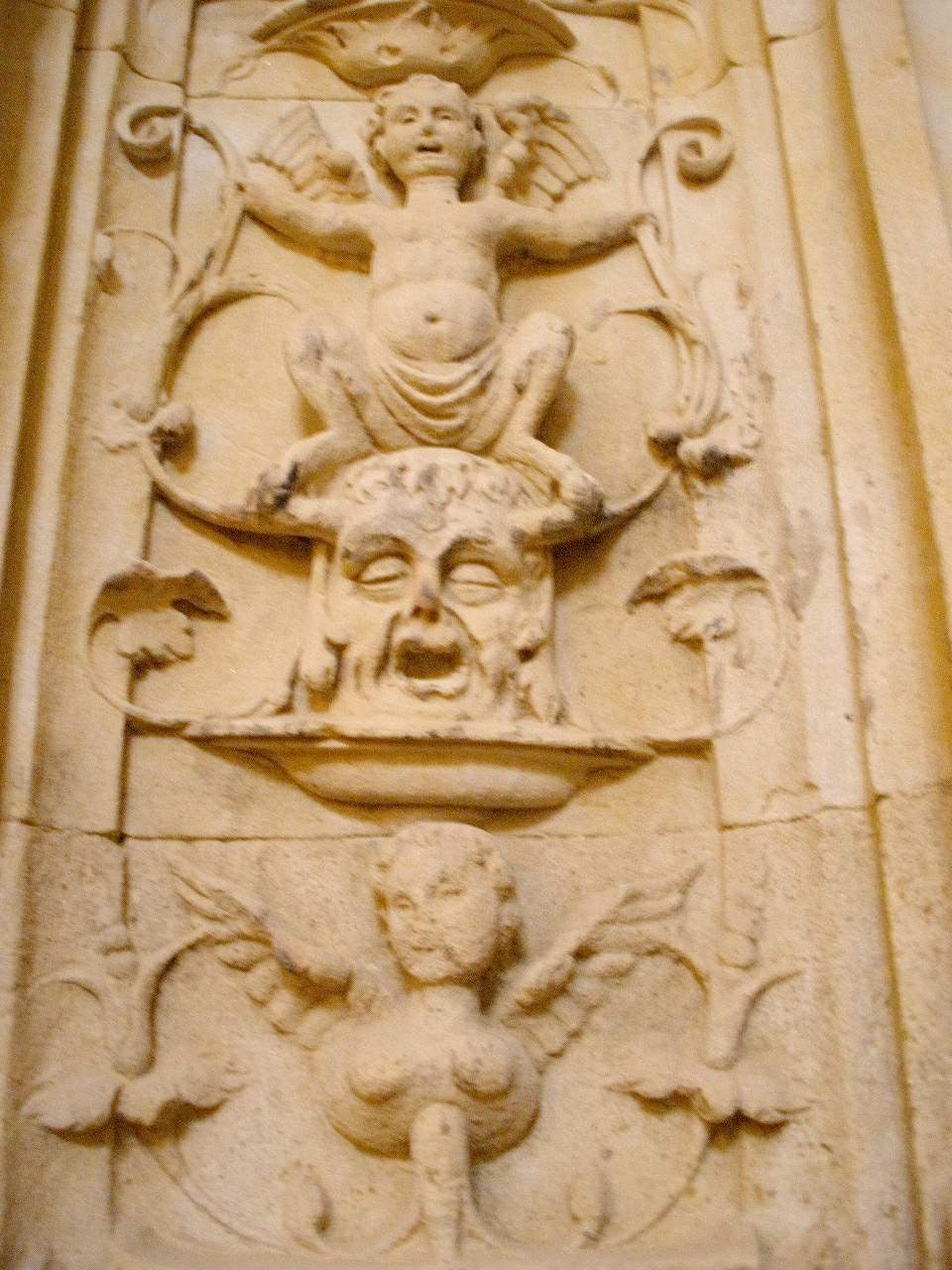
Detail in the Puerta de San José.

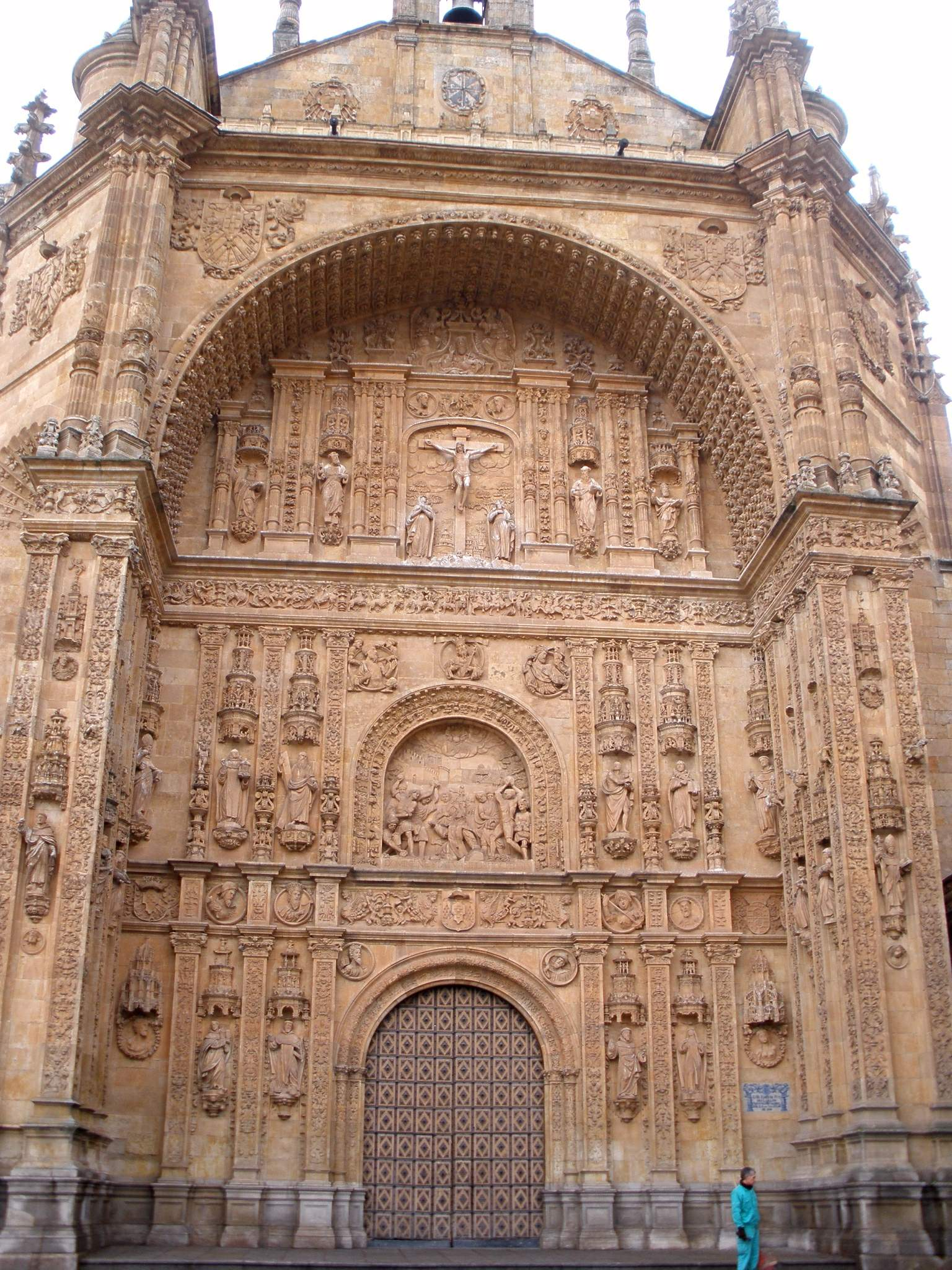
Decoration in the façade.
