= La Clerecía, Salamanca =

Jesuist building in Salamanca, Spain

La Clerecía
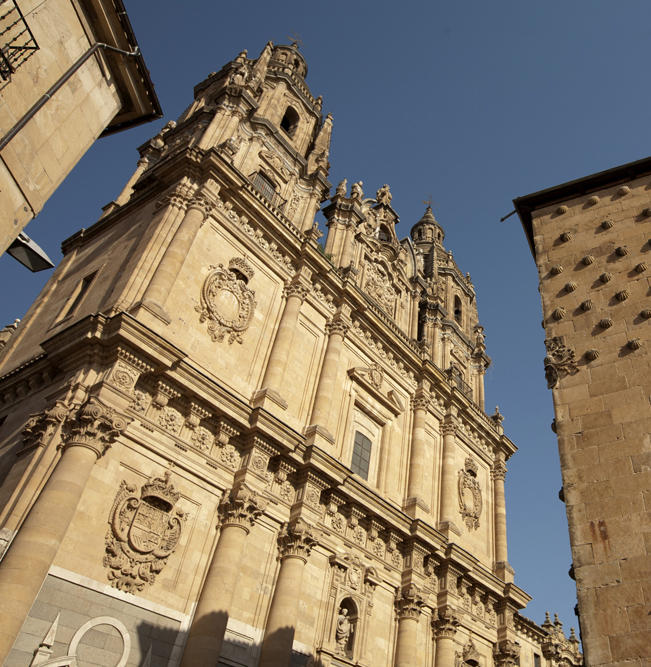
- Interactive map of the La Clerecía area

General information
- Architectural style: Baroque
- Location: Castile and León, Salamanca, Spain
- Coordinates: 40.9628°N 5.6662°W
- Completed: 1617
- Owner: Pontifical University of Salamanca

Design and construction
- Developer: Society of Jesus

Website
- torresdelaclerecia.com

UNESCO World Heritage Site
- Criteria: I, II, IV
- Reference: 381

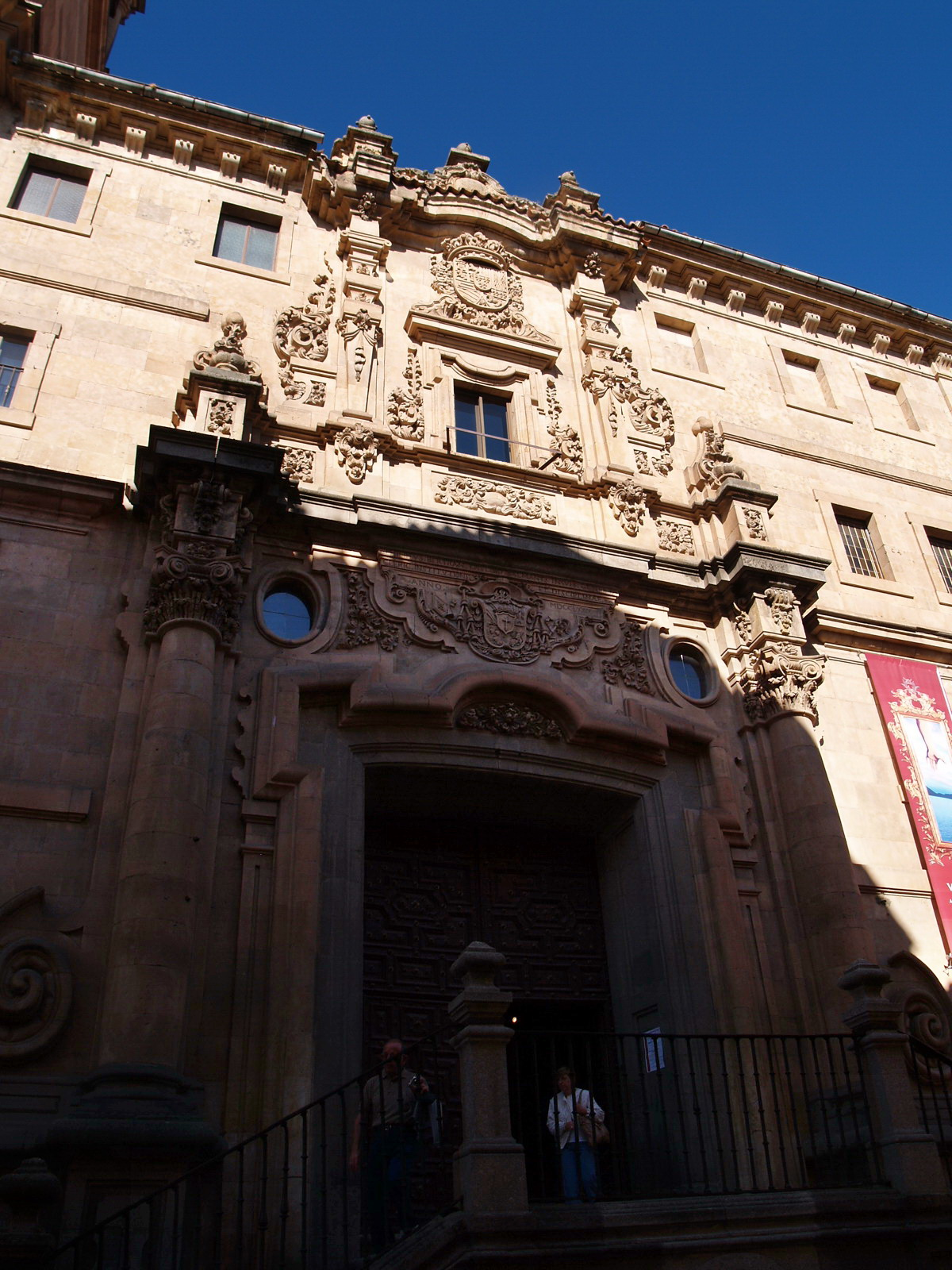
Pontifical University of Salamanca

La Clerecía is the name given to the building of the former Real Colegio del Espíritu Santo (or Santo Espíritu) of the Society of Jesus, built in Salamanca between the 17th and 18th centuries. It is of baroque style. It differs the college, with an interesting cloister, and the church, with an impressive facade of three bodies. The name of Clerecía is due to an abbreviated denomination of its belonging to the Real Clerecía de San Marcos after the expulsion of the Jesuits from Spain.

== History ==
Construction began in 1617 under the protection of Margaret of Austria, wife of Philip III, apparently as an act of reparation to the order for the imprisonment suffered by its founder, Ignatius of Loyola, by the Inquisition in the Mocha tower of the old cathedral of Salamanca. It was completed in 1754.

The general floor plan of the building is the work of Juan Gómez de Mora.

After the expulsion of the Jesuits from Spain, decreed by Charles III by means of the Pragmatic Sanction of 1767, the building was given to the Royal Clergy of San Marcos, with headquarters in the Church of San Marcos. The latter subsequently ceded the building (except for the church) to the Diocese of Salamanca, which installed the Seminary of San Carlos in it.

In 1940, the Pontifical University of Salamanca was created and instituted by Pope Pius XII, and the Diocese gave it the building as its headquarters. Although this delivery did not include the temple of the Holy Spirit, the Pontifical University suppressed its worship since September 2012 to be exploited for tourism. Only weddings of alumni and people linked to the Pontifical University are allowed.

== Art and architecture ==
=== The Church ===
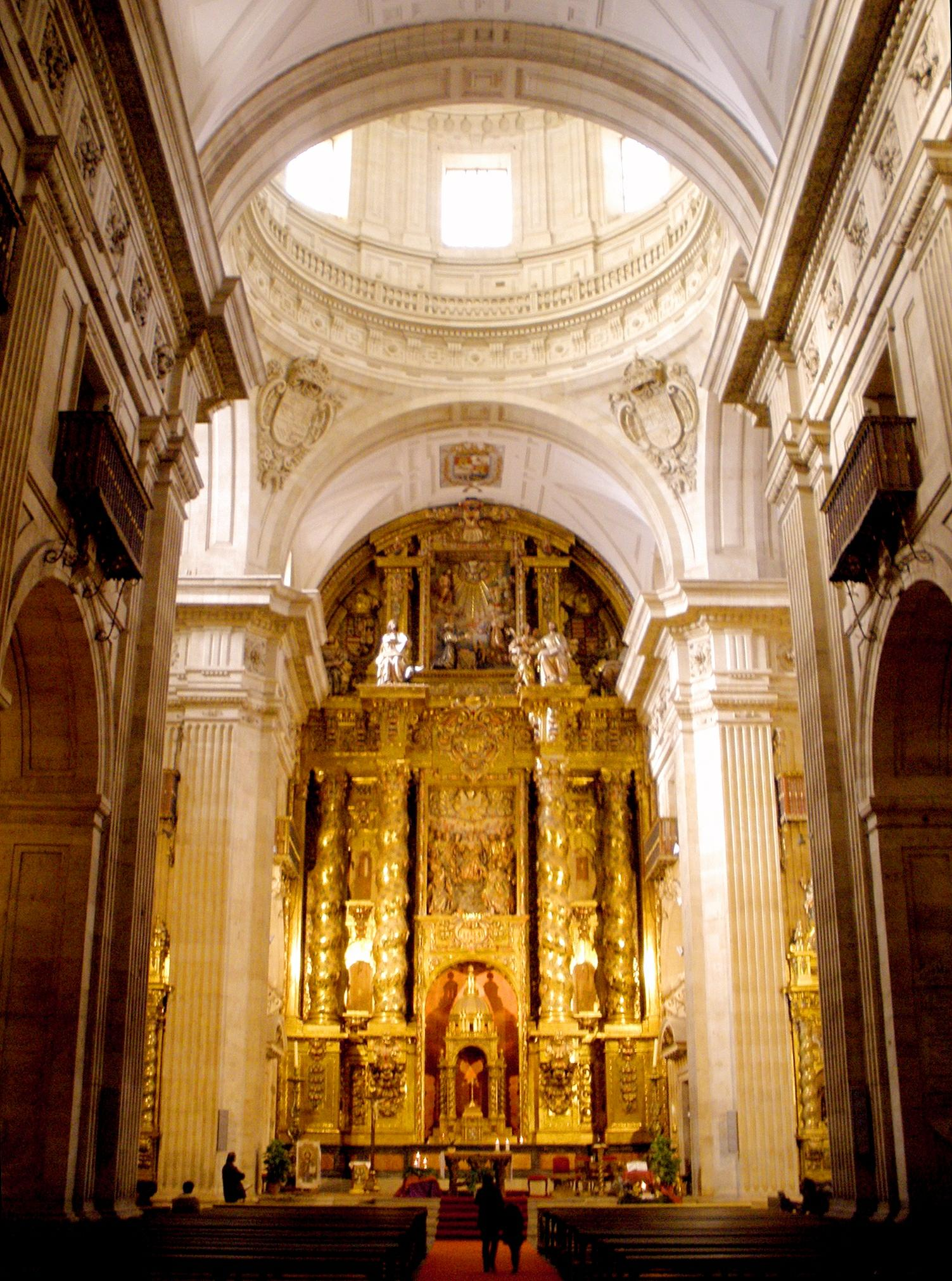
Central nave and chancel.

It has a monumental façade with three sections.

The first section has large Corinthian semicolumns guarding the three entrance doors. On the two lateral ones appear coats of arms of Spain, and on the central one a niche with the image of San Ignacio de Loyola. After the expulsion of the Jesuits, a stone lion was placed at the feet of the image, representing San Marcos. The second section shows two ovals with baroque decorations on the side streets and a large window in the central one whose light had to be reduced due to the weight of the upper sections. The design of both sections is due to Father Mato, a Jesuit architect.

The third section is the work of Andrés García de Quiñones, who built the towers following the model initially designed for the City Hall building in the Plaza Mayor and the central belfry with a relief of the Coming of the Holy Spirit and sculptures of the Virgin and the founding kings.

The church's interior has a single nave with chapels between buttresses, following the Jesuit scheme of the Roman church of Il Gesú, with four bays and a wide transverse nave that does not protrude. The construction is dominated by Tuscan pilasters with Scurialian reminiscences. The side chapels have balconies for the use of the Jesuits. The great dome that illuminates the interior is also the work of the Jesuit architect Mato, having the same height as the nave of the church, 50 m, and reinforced on several occasions due to its magnitude.

The naves are covered with lunette vaults with stucco decoration.

=== Main altarpiece ===
The altarpiece of the main chapel is the work of Juan Fernández in 1673 with sculptures by Juan Rodríguez.

It presents three streets, separated by four Solomonic columns of giant order adorned with bunches of grapes and three bodies. In the first two, the Fathers of the Church appear in the side streets: St. Gregory, St. Ambrose, St. Augustine, and St. Jerome. In the central street, a large display inspired by the church dome and a relief with the passage of Pentecost. In the last body is a relief of St. Ignatius writing the Spiritual Exercises inspired by the Virgin in the presence of the Trinity, flanked by the coats of arms of Kings Philip III and Margaret of Austria and the four evangelists.

The gilding work was completed in 1760.

=== Sacristy ===
It is located behind the main altar, a rectangular room with a length equivalent to the width of the main nave. It is covered with a barrel vault with lunettes, with five sections decorated with paintings.

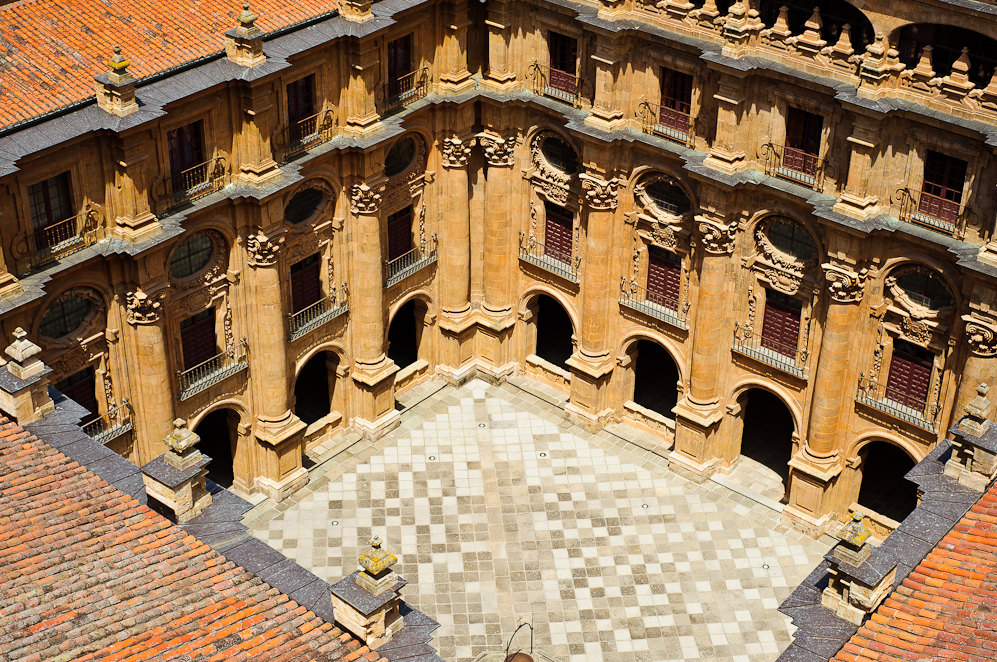
Courtyard of the Studios.

At the front of the sacristy is a niche altarpiece covered by mirrored panels organized as a triumphal arch on the sides, of which angels on rock carvings show the attributes of the Passion. On the entablature is an ivory crucifix flanked by angels and crowned by an oval shield with the anagram JHS stamped with a royal crown. This altarpiece was intended to protect the image of Jesus Flagellated, placed on a pedestal tabernacle, showed the wounds of the back through the set of mirrors, at the moment when Christ picks up his clothes after the flagellation, designed specifically for the sacristy as the place where the priest dressed for the liturgical ceremonies. The sculpture is the work of Luis Salvador Carmona.

When the sacristy became the Aula Minor of the Pontifical University, the image was moved to one of the church's side chapels.

=== Courtyard of the Studios ===
Also, by Andrés García de Quiñones, it presents a space closer to the courtyard of a royal palace than to the cloister of a religious building. The first two sections are divided by semicolumns of compound order, with an arched gallery on the first floor and balconies crowned by oculi on the first floor, accessed from the street and the church. On the third-floor balconies between flat pilasters.

The main floor of the cloister is decorated with 28 canvases, narrating the life of St. Ignatius from the battle of Pamplona to his death, commissioned by the Society of Jesus to the Neapolitan Sebastiano Conca.

== Institutions ==
=== Pontifical University of Salamanca ===
A private university founded in 1940.

=== Confraternities and brotherhoods ===
Several Penitential Brotherhoods that participate in the Holy Week of Salamanca have their headquarters in the church of the school:

- The "Hermandad Universitaria del Santísimo Cristo de la Luz y Nuestra Señora Madre de la Sabiduría". Founded in 1948.
- The "Hermandad de N.P. Jesús Flagelado y Nuestra Señora de las Lágrimas". Founded in 1948, although its origins date back to 1913.

== See also ==
- Old Cathedral of Salamanca

== Bibliography ==
- De León Perera, Cristo José (2018). La Compañía de Jesús en Salamanca (1548-1767). Vida cotidiana entre la misión y la universidad (in Spanish). Salamanca: CES.
- de León Perera, Cristo José. "Los jesuitas en la Salamanca de la Edad Moderna: estado de la cuestión" en Humanismo cristiano y Reforma protestante (1517-2017) (in Spanish). Salamanca: Ediciones Universidad Pontificia De Salamanca.
- Martínez Frías, José María; Pérez Hernández, Manuel; Lahoz, Lucía (2008). El arte barroco en Salamanca (in Spanish). Salamanca: Gruposa.
