= Holy Week in Salamanca =

Religious event in Salamanca, Spain

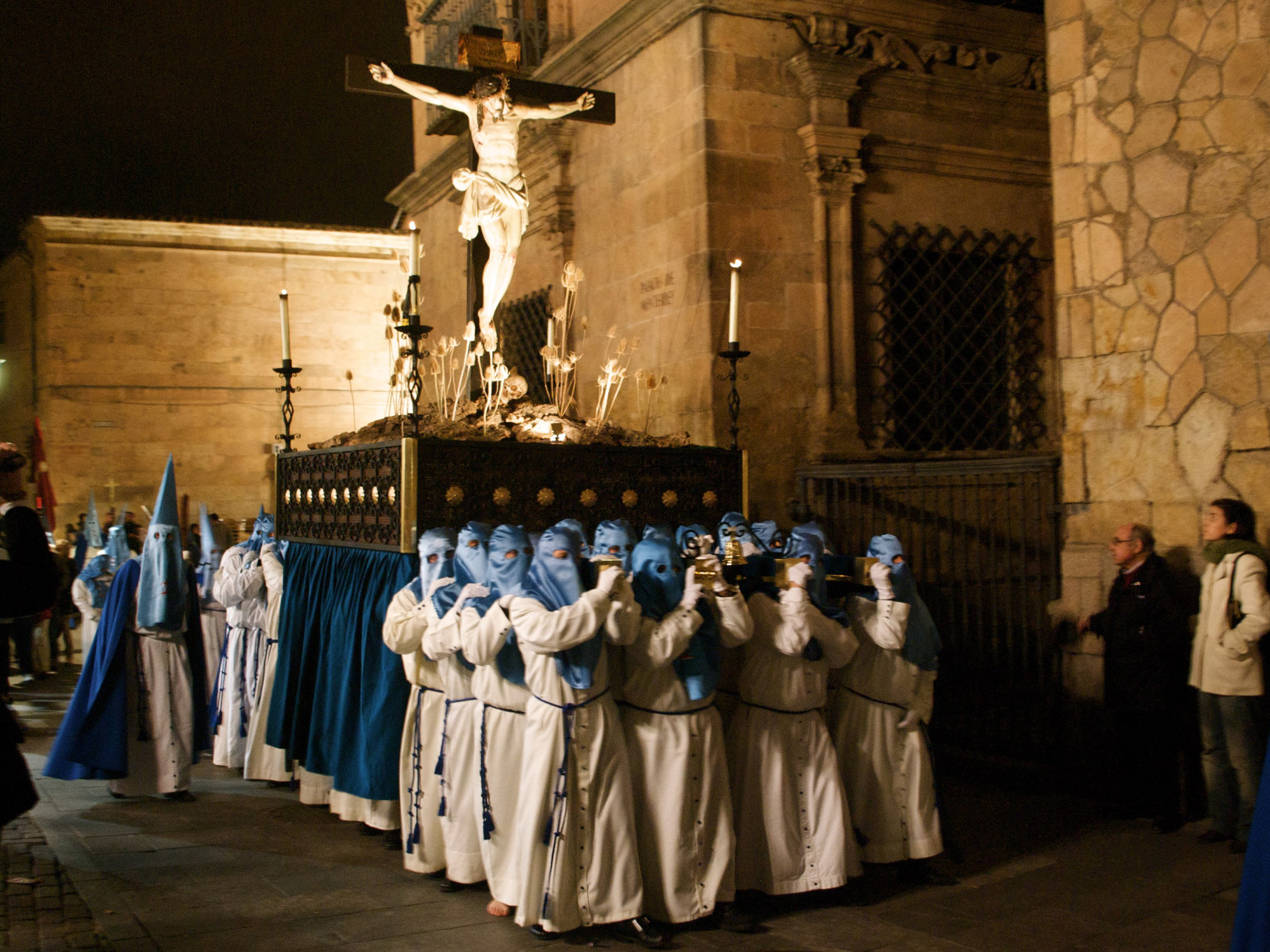
- Paso of El Cristo de los Doctrinos
- Official name: Semana Santa de Salamanca
- Observed by: Salamanca, Spain
- Type: Religious, Historical, Cultural
- Significance: Commemoration of the passion, death and resurrection of Jesus
- Celebrations: Processions
- Begins: Palm Sunday
- Ends: Easter Sunday
- 2025 date: April 13 - April 20
- 2026 date: March 29 - April 5
- 2027 date: March 21 - March 28
- 2028 date: April 9 - April 16
- Frequency: Annual

Holy Week in Salamanca (Semana Santa de Salamanca) is the most important religious event of Salamanca, Spain. It is celebrated in the week leading up to Easter (Holy Week among Christians).

During Holy Week, 18 fraternities feature 24 processions of pasos, floats of realistic wooden sculptures narrating scenes of the events of the Passion of Christ, or images of the Virgin Mary showing grief. Some of the sculptures are several centuries old and were created by important Spanish artists such as Luis Salvador Carmona, Alejandro Carnicero or Mariano Benlliure. Hundreds of penitents or cofrades take part on the parades, either carrying the pasos or walking the old streets of the city with crosses, flags or candles. Thousands of people, locals and visitors attend the events.

The city of Salamanca was declared UNESCO World Heritage Site in 1988. The historic center offers a unique and attractive background for this celebration. The old streets and the impressive sites and landmarks provide the perfect atmosphere for the processions.

As a reflection of its cultural, historic and spiritual importance, Holy Week in Salamanca was declared Fiesta of International Tourist Interest of Spain in 2003.

== The Processions ==
Processions are the main event of Semana Santa in Salamanca. Every fraternity organizes its own procession. Some of them organize more than one parade during the week, following the Castilian tradition. Generally speaking the processions walk through the city center, from their home Church to the Cathedral and Plaza Mayor or surroundings. However, there are a few exceptions that make every parade unique.

All processions have the same structure:

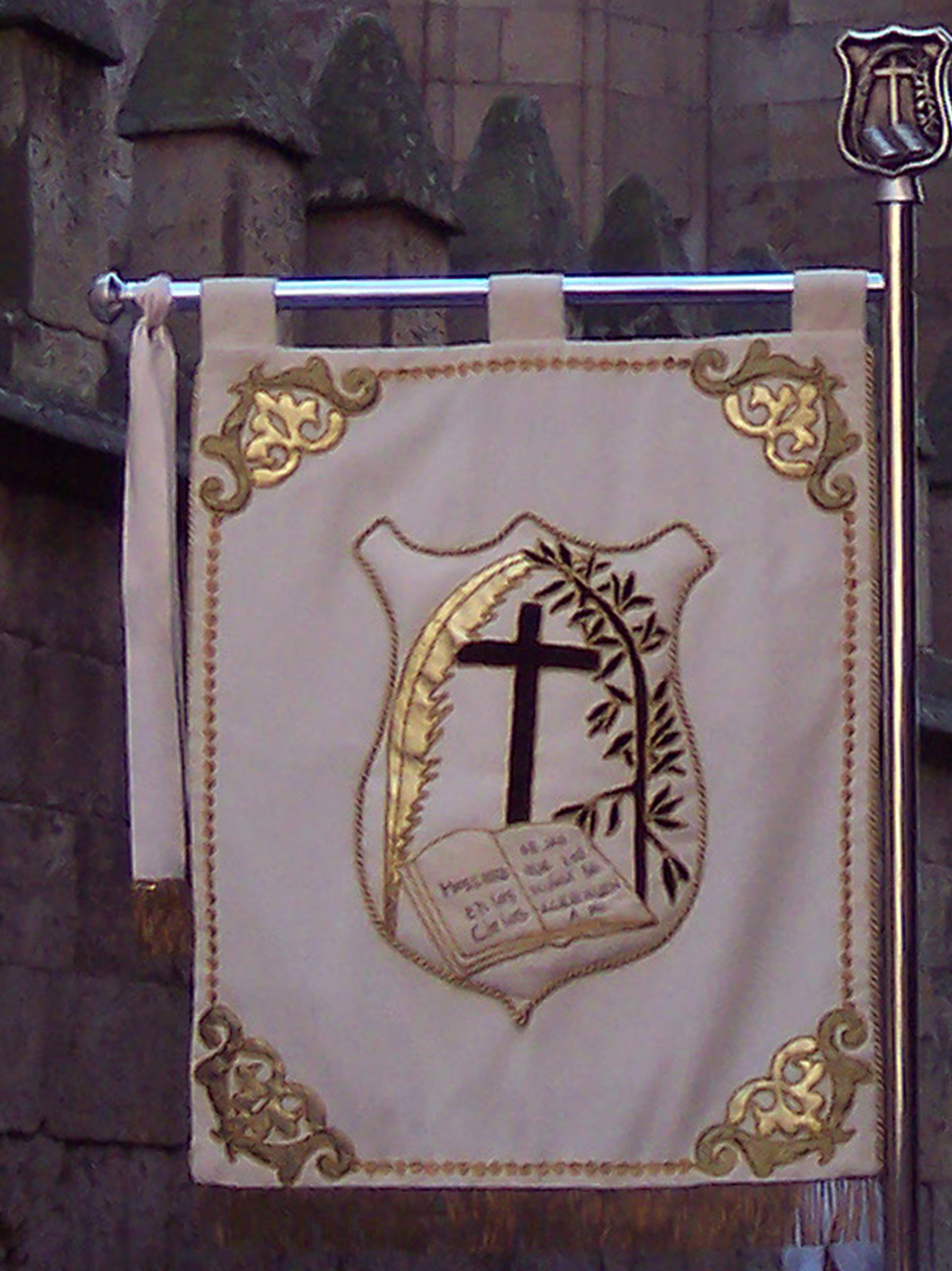
Flag of the brotherhood of the Donkey

- A guiding cross opens the parade.
- A number of penitents dressed with the robe or habit of the brotherhood. A few of them carry flags to announce which brotherhood is making penance. Most brothers accompany the parade with candles or sticks with crosses. Other carry heavy crosses and chains. Some of them might walk barefoot.
- In some cases, a group of acolytes
- The paso or pasos
- Presidency that always includes the presence of the titular chaplain of the brotherhood in full processional vestments. A few members of other fraternities may accompany as well, as a courtesy and in the important parades such as the Holy Entombment of Christ the Bishop of Salamanca presides the procession.
- Marching band

Some processions do not use bands, walking just with the accompaniment of choirs or wind instrument trios such as the Cristo de la Liberación. The Vera Cruz walks in complete silence on its procession in Monday of Holy Week.

Typically, a procession can be made up from a few hundred to near 3,000 brothers (Loneliness brotherhood for example) and last anywhere from 4 to 7 hours. The largest processions can take over an hour to cross one particular spot.

== The Pasos ==
The pasos are the core of the festival. They consist of a wooden sculpture or group of sculptures that narrates a scene from the Passion of Christ. They are carried by porters in a platform or staves. The porters are called hermanos de paso or brothers of the paso. Men and women carry the floats. A minority of pasos are carried on structures with wheels due to its heaviness.

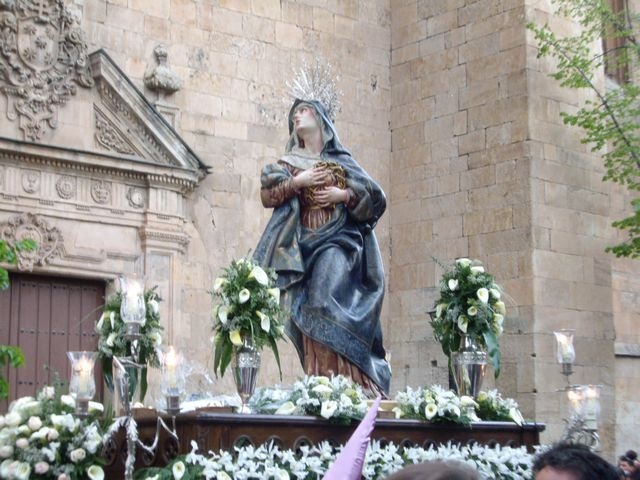
Procession of The Agony for whom the Dolorosa was made by Inocencio Soriano Montagut in 1939, Thursday of Holy Week

Some of the pasos of Salamanca were created by important artist and are considered great art pieces. These are some examples:

- Luis Salvador Carmona realized the Virgen de la Piedad (Virgin of Piety) in 1765 and the Jesús Flagelado (Flagellated Jesus) in 1760.
- Felipe del Corral realized the Virgen de los Dolores (Virgin of Sorrows) in 1718.
- Alejandro Carnicero realized the Flagelación del Salvador (Flagellation of the Savior) in 1724.
- José de Larra Churriguera realized Jesús en la calle de la Amargura (Jesus in the path of bitterness) in 1715.
- Inocencio Soriano Montagut created la Dolorosa (Virgin of Sorrows) in 1939
- Mariano Benlliure realized the Virgen de la Soledad (Virgin of Loneliness) in 1941.

The pasos are usually ornated with flowers, white for the Virgin and red or purple for Jesus.

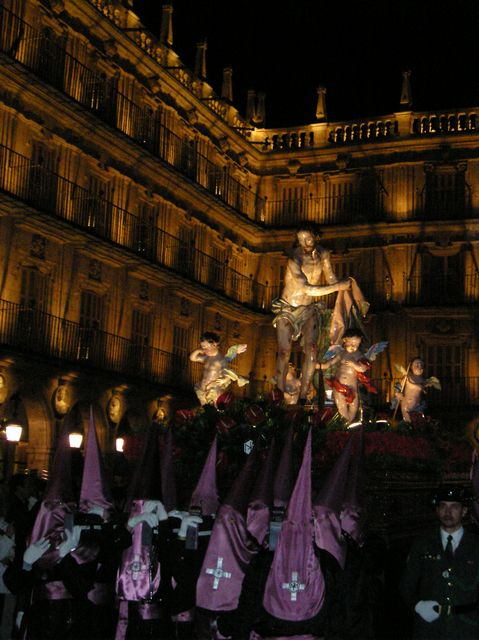
Procession of El Flagelado in the Plaza Mayor, Wednesday of Holy Week

== The Days of Holy Week ==
Below is a list of the brotherhoods which make penance each day, as of 2013.

=== Friday of Sorrows ===
- Procession of the Via Matris. Brotherhood of the Vera Cruz 1909
- Traslado of Cristo de la Liberación. Brotherhood of Christ of Love and Peace 1988

=== Palm Sunday Eve ===
- Procession of Jesús de la Redención (The Redemption) 2019
- Procession of the Hermandad Franciscana (Franciscan Brotherhood) 2017

=== Palm Sunday ===
- Procession of La Borriquilla (The Donkey) 1945
- Procession of Jesús Despojado (Stripped Jesus) 2008
- Procession of El Perdón (The Forgiveness) 1945

=== Monday of Holy Week ===
- Procession of Cristo de los Doctrinos 1985

=== Tuesday of Holy Week ===
- Procession of Los Estudiantes (The students) 1948

=== Wednesday of Holy Week ===
- Procession of Jesús Flagelado (The Flagellation) 1913/1948
- Procession of Cristo Yacente 1987

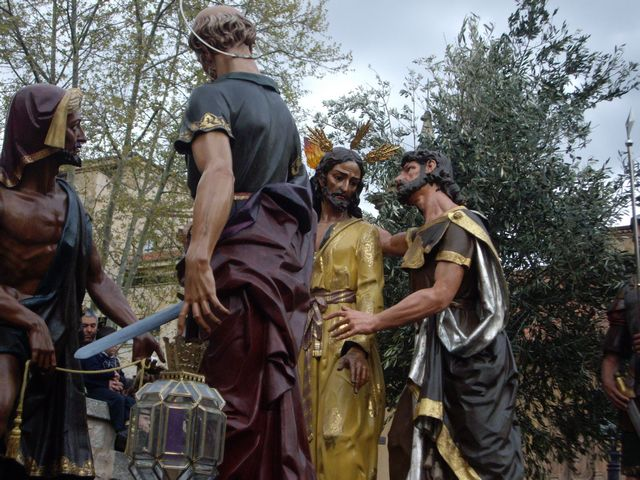
Procession of The Agony, Thursday of Holy Week

=== Thursday of Holy Week ===
- Procession of the Via Crucis 1989
- Procession of El Cristo de la Agonía (The Agony) 1926
- Procession of El Cristo del Amor y de la Paz (Love and Peace) 1971

=== Good Friday ===
- Procession of the Hermandad Dominicana (commonly known as "The 5am procession" due to the schedule of the parade) 1945
- Acto del Descendimiento (Descent from the Cross) Brotherhood of the Vera Cruz 1615
- Procession of the Huerto de los olivos (The Mount of Olives) 1952
- Procession of Jesús Rescatado (Rescued) 1860
- Procession of Jesús Nazareno 1715
- Procession of the Santo Entierro (Holy Entombment of Christ) 1615 Brotherhood of the Vera Cruz

=== Saturday of Holy Week ===
- Procession of La Soledad (The Loneliness) 1890
- Procession of La Liberación (The Liberation) 1988
- Procession of el Silencio (Silence) 1985

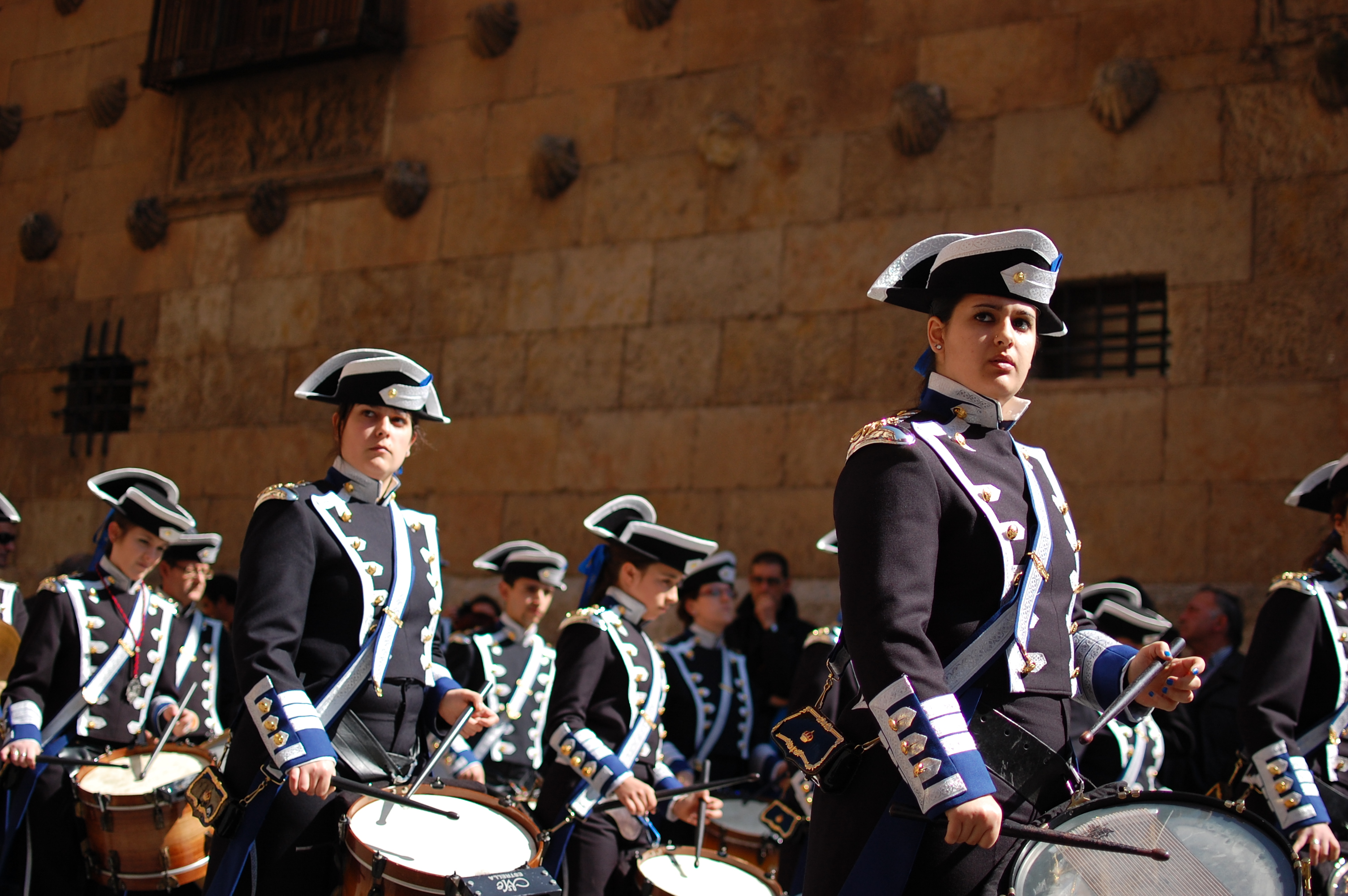
Band in the Procession of The Meeting, Easter Sunday

=== Easter Sunday ===
- Procession of the Encuentro (The Meeting) Brotherhood of the Vera Cruz 1616

== History ==
The earliest references about penance processions in Salamanca go back to 1240, when the first penitents were organized around the Franciscans.

In 1506 the Cofradia de la Vera Cruz (Brotherhood of the True Cross) was established in the Convent of San Francisco, following the medieval tradition. Starting in the 16th century, this fraternity run a Hospital and a Print. The brothers also built their own church.

With the Council of Trento (1545 - 1563) and the Counterreformation popular piety was supported by the Roman Catholic Church. As a result, processions became even more important, specially those of Corpus Christi and Holy Week. Also, during the Baroque period wooden pasos were introduced as we know them today and became essential to the Holy Week commemoration.

In 1615 the Cofradía de la Vera Cruz established the Acto del Descendimiento or Descent from the Cross and the Procesión del Santo Entierro or Holy Entombment of Christ Procession. In 1616 was celebrated for the first time the Procesión del Encuentro or the Resurrection Procession. These celebrations had two intentions: the first one was to teach the illiterate people of Salamanca the events of the Passion and Resurrection of Christ. These baroque celebrations were very theatrical so anyone could understand the sacred history. The second intention was to provide an organized penance processions to the sinners. The only fraternity allowed to perform these celebrations was the Vera Cruz.

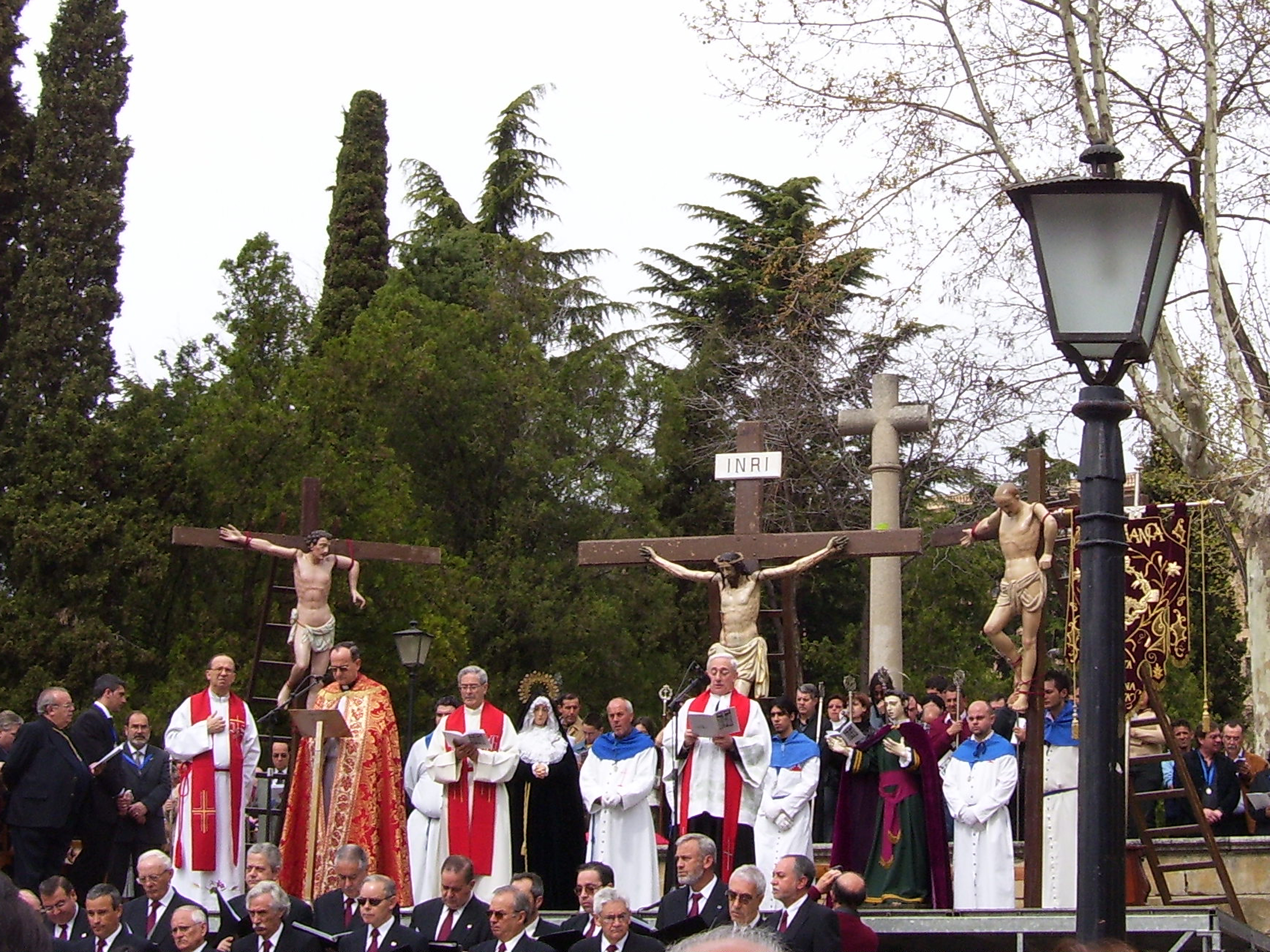
Commemoration of the Descent from the Cross by the Brotherhood of la Vera Cruz

These processions are performed in the present and are the quintessential events of the Holy Week in Salamanca.

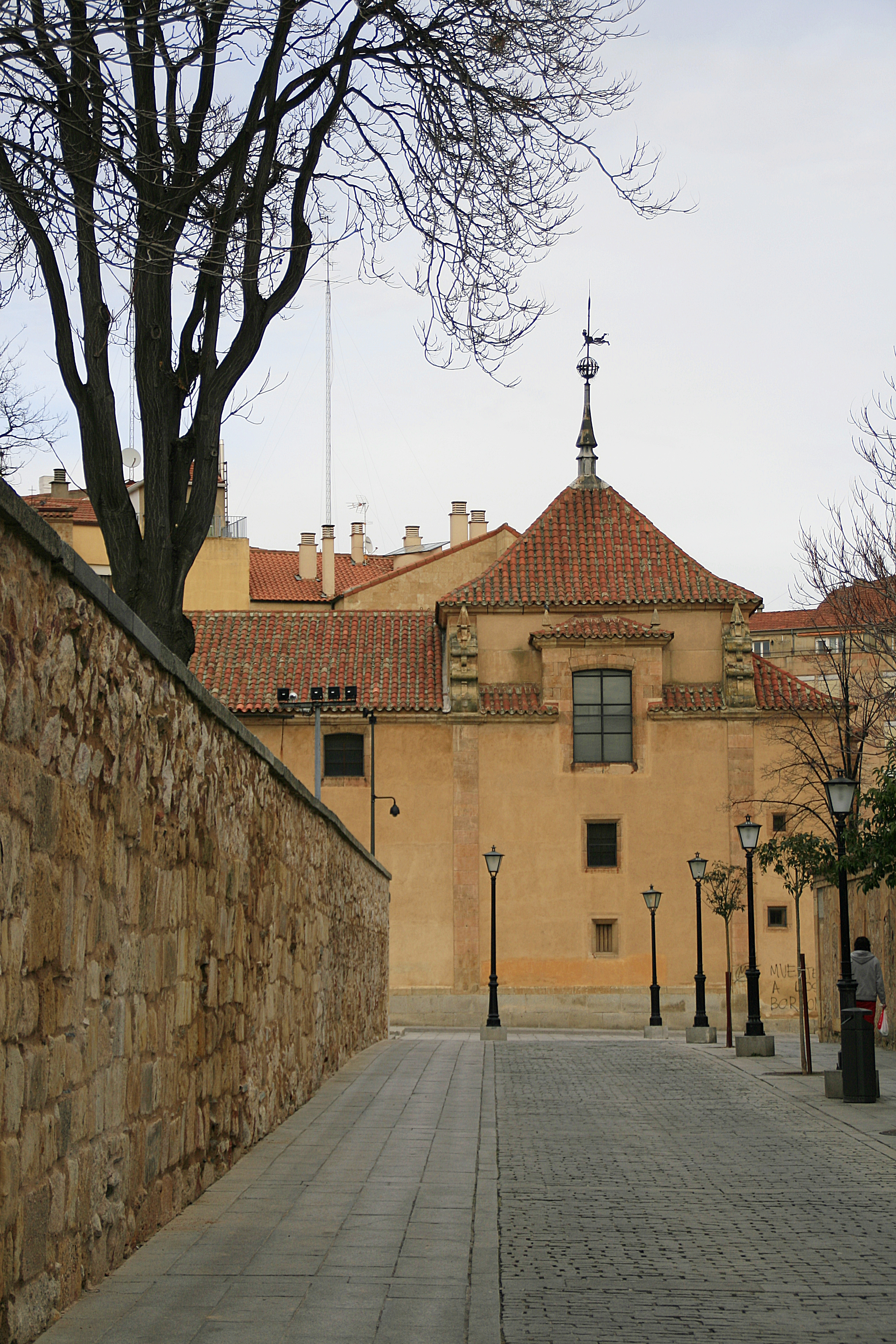
The Chapel of the Brotherhood of la Vera Cruz

La Vera Cruz became very powerful and wealthy in the 18th century. The brothers commissioned to the Churriguera family a lavish decoration of their church that includes three altar pieces, holding in its interior not only the pasos but many other art pieces such as paintings and silverware. During this century, the fraternity also commissioned the best sculptures for the processions such as La Flagelación, Ecce Homo by Alejandro Carnicero or La Dolorosa by Felipe del Corral. This pasos still are some of the best examples of baroque art in Salamanca.

In the 18th and 19th centuries other fraternities joined the processions of la Vera Cruz: Jesús Nazareno did so in 1715 thus was created in 1688, Jesús Rescatado in 1860 (created in 1689) and La Soledad in 1890 (origins in 1645). These processions were celebrated exclusively in Good Friday and Easter Sunday.

In the 20th century were established the majority of the fraternities. Since the 1900s there was an increasing interest in improving the Holy Week in Salamanca. Guilds and professional unions took action and created more brotherhoods. In 1913 the retailers created a section inside la Vera Cruz that a few years later would become the brotherhood of Jesús Flagelado. In 1926 the local Chamber of trade and commerce created the Cristo de la Agonia again in the convent of the franciscans. Some other improvements were made to the already existing pasos and fraternities.

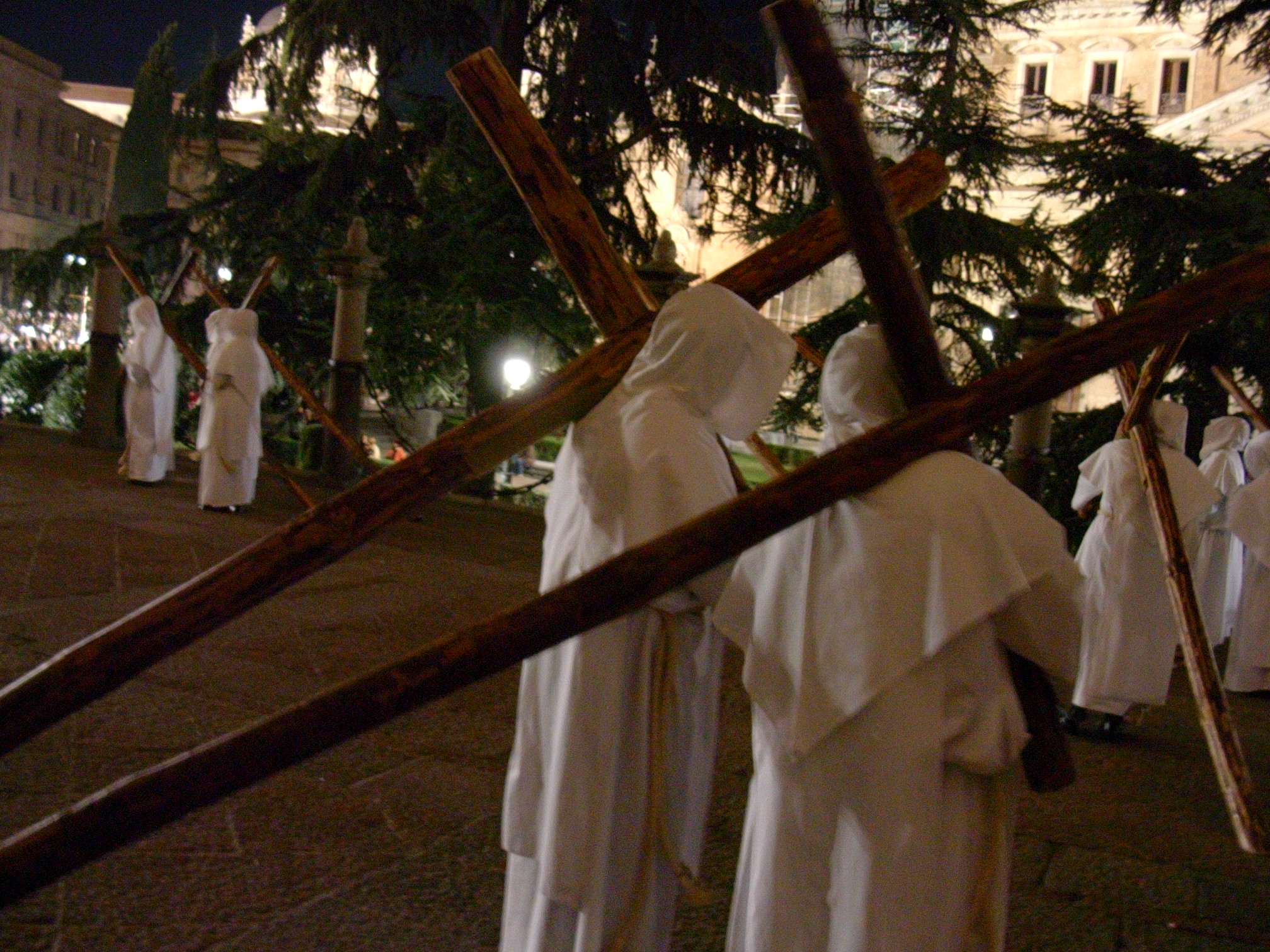
Brothers of the Cofradía del Amor y de la Paz (Love and Peace)

After the Spanish Civil War 9 more fraternities were created. Since the mid-1940s there were processions everyday from Palm Sunday to Easter Sunday in Salamanca. The social atmosphere of the Franquism was very supportive of this kind of Catholic celebration. At the end of the Dictatorship of General Franco Holy Week in Salamanca experienced a deep crisis. Many fraternities stopped their activities and some of them were extinguished. The participants were so few that the entire celebration was on the edge of disappearance.

However, in 1971 a new brotherhood was created, the Cristo del Amor y de la Paz (Jesus of Love and Peace). This fraternity updated the celebration and included the new lines proposed in the Vatican Council II. Their actions greatly helped to recover the interest of the locals in the Semana Santa.

Between 1984 and 2019, 6 new fraternities have been created, and many new pasos have been introduced. Nowadays, 10,000 people have joined the fraternities and participate in the processions.

In 2003 Holy Week in Salamanca was declared Fiesta of International Tourist Interest of Spain.

== Singularities ==
Holy Week in Salamanca features a number of distinctive singularities that make this festival specially appealing for visitors.

- The streets and landmarks of the historic city create a spiritual atmosphere for the processions that other places cannot provide.
- The historic links with the University of Salamanca, the oldest institution of its kind in Spain. The Promise of Silence performed by the Brotherhood of the Students is considered the highlight of the celebration.
- The inspired and artistic pasos are considered among the best sculptures of the Castilian School of Imagery
- Some of the processions have been celebrated for four centuries. The oldest brotherhood is more than five centuries old and its roots are almost eight centuries old.
- The local gastronomy offers special dishes, related with Holy Week one way or another such as Hornazo, Pestiños, or Limones.
