= Illustrious Brotherhood of the Holy Cross of the Redeemer and the Immaculate Conception, his Mother (Salamanca) =

Catholic fraternity in Salamanca, Spain

The Illustrious Brotherhood of the Holy Cross of the Redeemer and the Immaculate Conception, his Mother, known as the Vera Cruz or True Cross is a Catholic fraternity established in Salamanca, Castile and León, Spain in 1506.

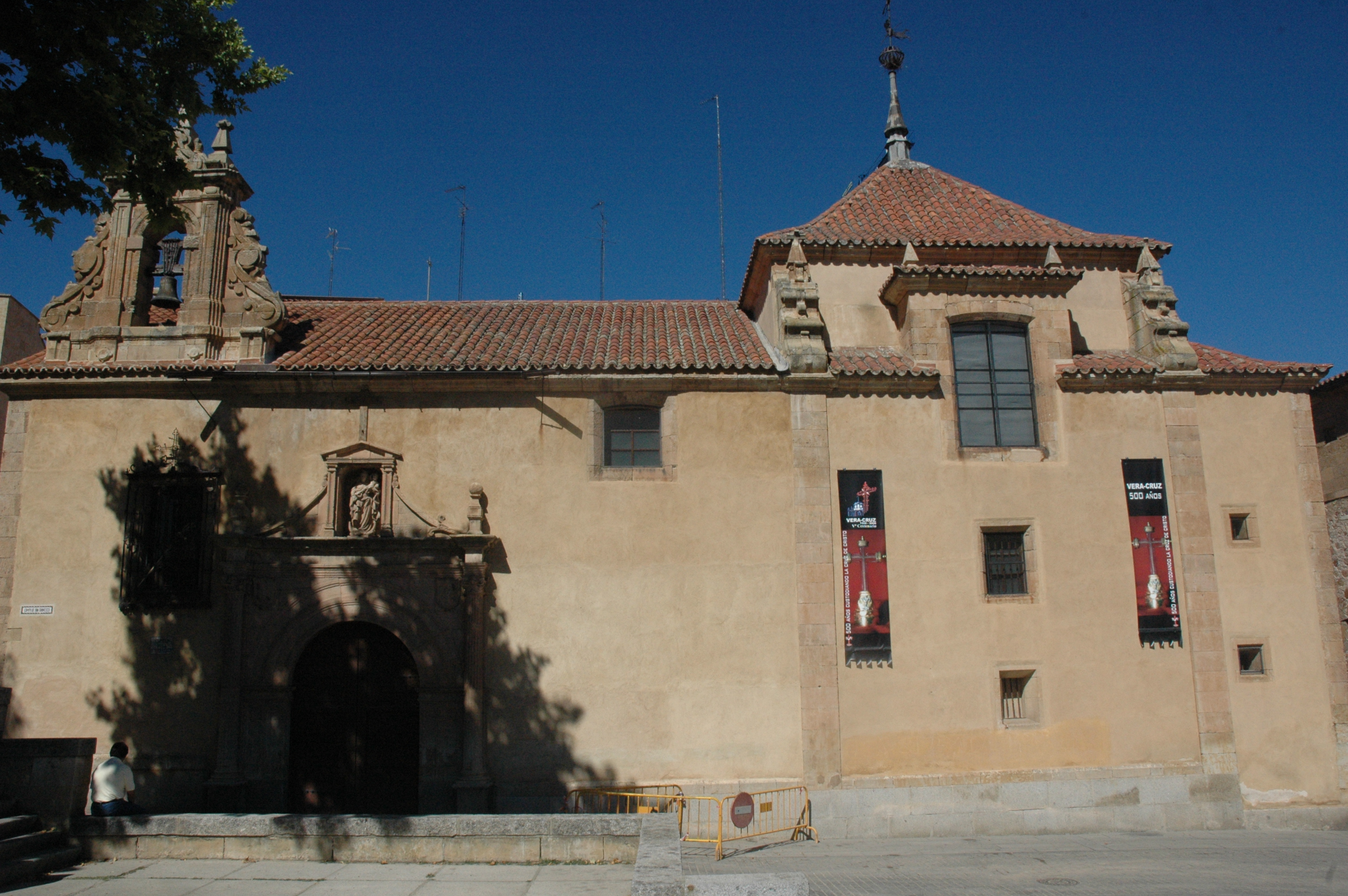
The Chapel of the Vera Cruz

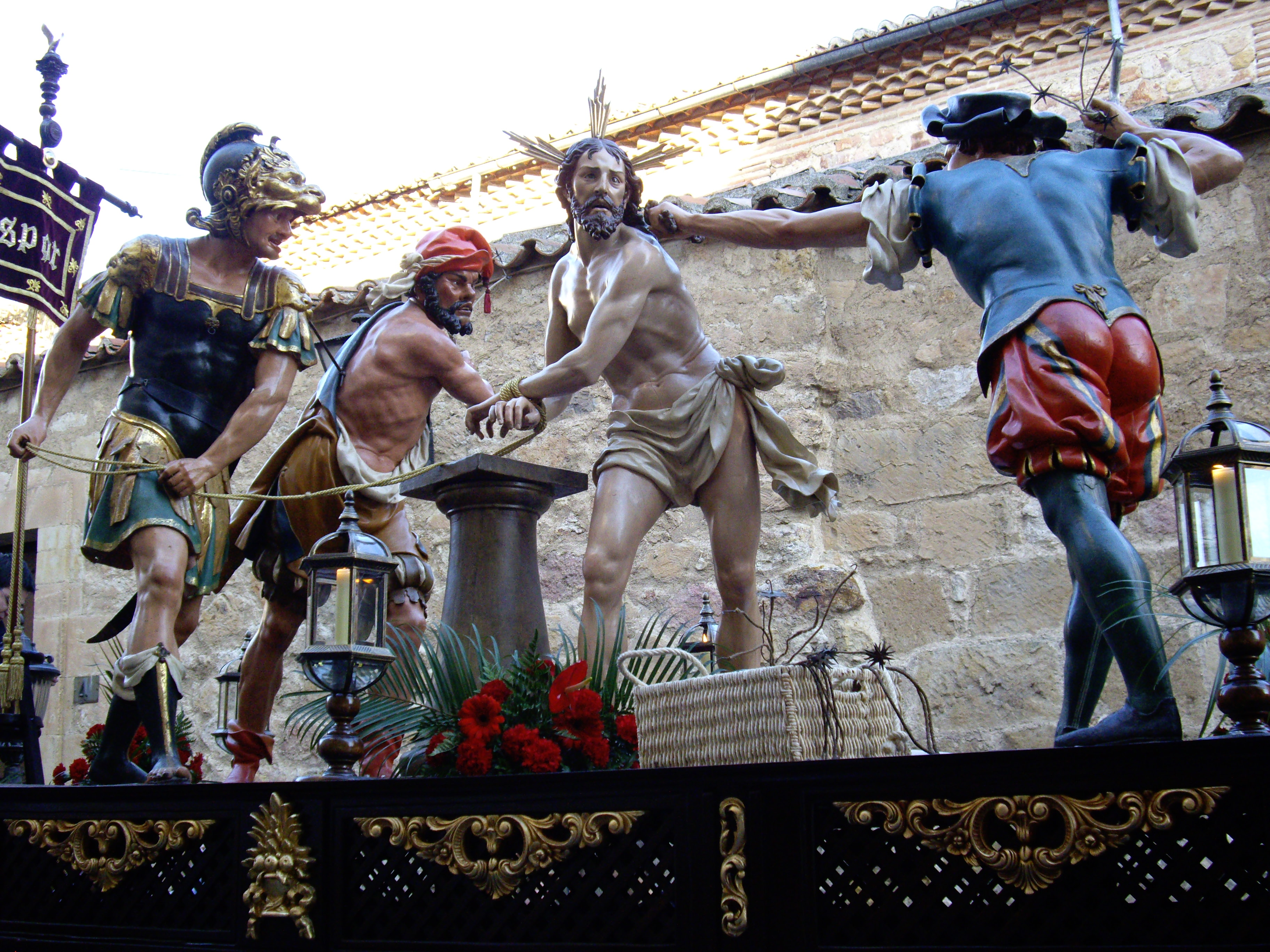
The Flagellation of the Saviour by Alejandro Carnicero, 1724

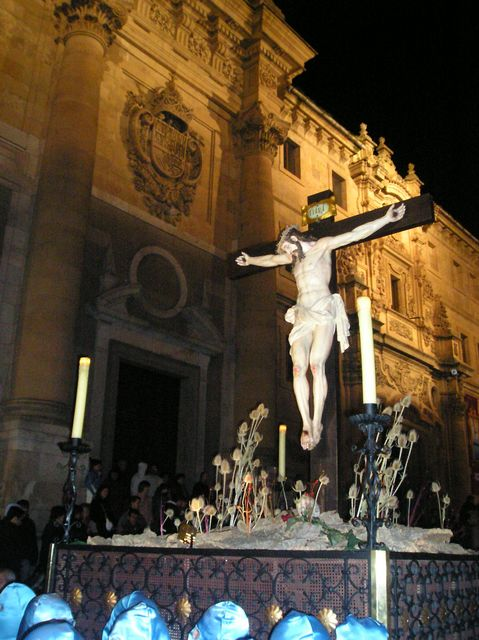
The Cristo de los Doctrinos, 18th century

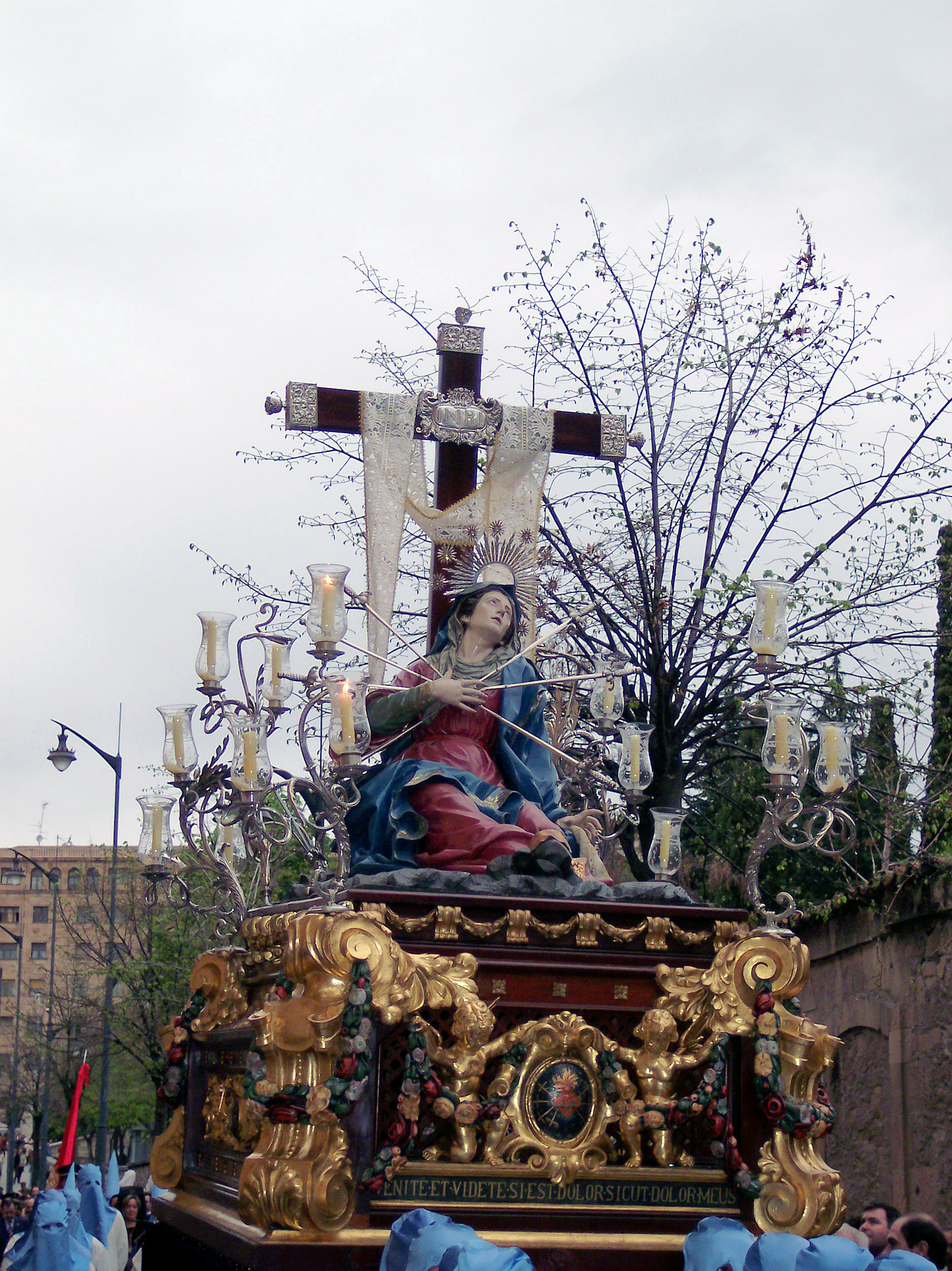
The Virgin of Sorrows La Dolorosa in her paso

== Mission and activities ==
The brotherhood of the Cross has the mission of promoting the devotion to the Cross of Christ and the Immaculate Conception of the Blessed Virgin Mary. To achieve this objective, the members of the brotherhood celebrate several ceremonies, processions and masses according to the liturgic calendar of the Roman Catholic Church and the Estatutos o constitutions of the own brotherhood.

The brotherhood is known as the Vera Cruz or True Cross because the institution owns a relic consisting in physical remnants which, by a Christian tradition, are believed to be from the cross upon which Jesus was crucified.

The most popular activities of the Vera Cruz are the Holy Week processions. The Vera Cruz is the oldest brotherhood in Salamanca so are some of its processions. The Vera Cruz celebrates four processions during Holy Week and another one during the celebrations of the Corpus Christi feast.

- Friday of Sorrows (A week before Good Friday): Procession of the Via Matris (The Way of Mary) 1909.
- Monday of Holy Week: Procession of the Cristo de los Doctrinos. 1985
- Good Friday: Ceremony of the Descent from the Cross. 1615
- Good Friday: Procession of the Entombment of Christ. 1615
- Easter Sunday: Procession of the Meeting or Resurrection. 1616
- Sacramental Feast (Eight days after Corpus Christi feast): Procession with the Corpus Christi. 16th. century.

== The Chapel of the True Cross ==
The brotherhood decided to build its own church in the 16th century. The building was commissioned to architect Rodrigo Gil de Hontañón. Since its consecration the chapel has been the headquarters of the Vera Cruz. The church was modified and ornated, according to baroque style by Churriguera in 1713 and 1714. In 1718 the Chapel of the Sorrows was added, holding in its interior the image of Virgin of Sorrows by sculptor Felipe del Corral.

The Chapel holds countless art pieces including an impressive altarpiece by Churriguera, paintings, sculptures, the pasos, liturgic vestments and silverware.

== The Pasos ==
The Vera Cruz is the brotherhood in Salamanca with the larger number of pasos and images:

- The Agony in the Garden, work by Juan Tenan Coll, 1727 (5 images)
- The Flagellation of the Saviour, work by Alejandro Carnicero, 1724 (4 images)
- The Balcony of Pilato, Alejandro Carnicero?, 1740 (4 images)
- Jesus Carrying the Cross, anonymous, 17th. century (single image)
- The Veronica, Francisco González Macias, 1947 (5 images)
- The Calvary, anon. 17th century (4 images)
- Cristo de los Doctrinos, anon. 18th century. Belongs to the group of the Calvary. Participates alone in the Monday of Holy Week procession (single image)
- Virgin of the bitterness, Pedro Hernández, 1615. Belongs to the group of the Descent of the Cross but participates alone in the Monday of Holy Week procession (single image)
- The Descent from the Cross, Pedro Hernández and Antonio de Paz, 1615 (5 images)
- The Virgin of Sorrows, work by Felipe del Corral, 1718 (single image)
- The Holy Sepulchre, Pedro Hernández, 1615 (Body of Jesus) and Anon. 1678 (The Coffin) (single image)
- The Maries at the Sepulchre, Pedro Hernández, 1617 (4 images)
- The Virgin of Happiness, anon. 18th century (single image)
- Resurrection of Jesus, Alejandro Carnicero? 1724 (5 images)

== History ==
The origins of the True Cross can be found in 1240, around the Franciscans and the earliest penance processions. In 1506 was formally established and in 1527 was merged with the Brotherhood of the Immaculate Conception.

During the 16th century the True Cross became a powerful institution in Salamanca. In 1572 obtained from King Felipe II of Spain the privilege of organize the penance processions in Salamanca. That privilege disbanded other emerging sodalities in the city. The privilege was confirmed by kings Felipe III and Felipe V of Spain and was effectively used until 1905. During the 16th century the brotherhood ran a hospital and a print and increased its possessions purchasing or building several real estate properties, including its chapel.

In the 17th century organized, according to the baroque atmosphere, brilliant processions and ceremonies in Salamanca, such as the Ceremony of the Descent from the Cross and the Holy Entombment of Christ Procession (Good Friday) since 1615 and the Resurrection Procession (Easter Sunday) since 1616. Other processions took place on Wednesday and Thursday of Holy Week, but they were only celebrated until 1806. That year the Bishop of Salamanca merged all parades in only two to be celebrated in Good Friday and Easter Sunday.

The 18th century was very important for the True Cross since in this time commissioned and purchased important art works for the chapel. They also renewed some of the pasos. As a result, the Holy Week in Salamanca experienced a Golden Age. During this period, the fraternity of Jesús Nazareno, was allowed to participate with its paso, created by Jose de Larra Churriguera, in the Thursday of Holy Week procession.

The 19th century proved to be a difficult time to the institution. The liberal governments confiscated many ecclesiastic goods and real estates, and the end of some privileges lead the True Cross to an increasing decadence and towards a deep financial crisis. Only at the end of the century the brotherhood flourished again around the devotion of the Virgin of Sorrows. The devotion grow so strong that in 1909 a procession for the Virgin was established, in Friday of Sorrows.

The Spanish Civil War was disastrous for the brotherhood. It lost most of its members and it went practically bankrupted. Thankfully the art pieces and the chapel remained in acceptable condition. In 1942 the Junta de Semana Santa was created (a Board to protect Holy Week) and it greatly helped the True Cross in its activities.

After 1985 the True Cross experienced a time of expansion, increasing the number of its members up to 500. With this growth, the brothers had the financial means to restore most of its patrimony and even organize a brand new procession in Monday of Holy Week.

In 2006 the Holy Cross celebrated its five-hundred-year-old anniversary. The City council of Salamanca gave to the brothers the Gold Medal of the city in recognition to its historic, social and religious importance.
