= Pedro Hernández =

Pedro Hernández may refer to:

== Sportspeople ==
=== Association football ===
- Pedro Hernández (footballer, born 1978), Spanish manager and former right-back
- Pedro Hernández (footballer, born 1981), Mexican coach and former goalkeeper
- Pedro Pablo Hernández (born 1986), Chilean midfielder for O'Higgins
- Pedro Hernández (footballer, born 1993), Mexican defensive midfielder
- Pedro Hernández (soccer, born 1999), American midfielder for Chattanooga Red Wolves
- Pedro Hernández (footballer, born 2000), Mexican centre-back for León

=== Baseball ===
- Pedro Hernández (infielder) (born 1959), former third baseman
- Pedro Hernández (pitcher) (born 1989), Major League Baseball pitcher

=== Other sports ===
- Pedro Hernández (fencer) (born 1955), Cuban Olympic fencer

== Other ==
- Pedro Hernández, a fictional character in the 2024–2025 comic book series Nemesis: Rogues' Gallery
- Pedro Hernández de Córdova (fl. 1564-1602), Spanish soldier
- Pedro Hernández (sculptor) (died 1665), Spanish sculptor
- Pedro Hernandez (artist) (born 1932), Cuban artist
- Pedro Hernandez (murderer) (born 1961), convicted of kidnapping and murdering Etan Patz

== See also ==
- Bruno Mars (born 1985), American singer-songwriter and record producer, born as Peter Gene Hernandez
- Peter Avalon (born 1989), American professional wrestler, born as Peter Hernandez
