= Alejandro Carnicero =

Spanish sculptor

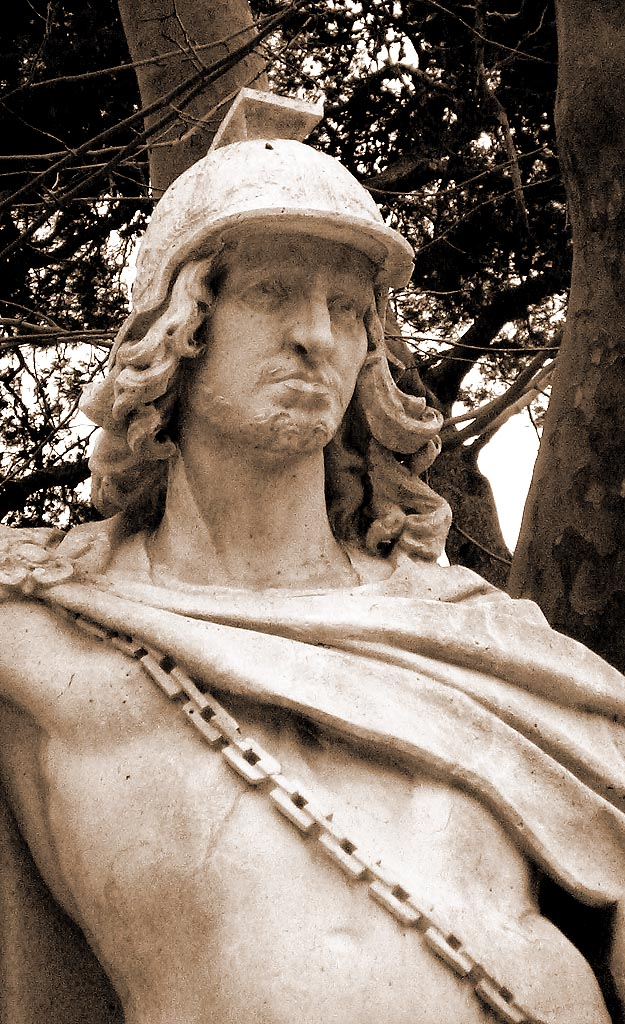
- King Wamba; Royal Palace of Madrid
- Born: 1693; Íscar, Crown of Castile, Spain
- Died: 1756 (aged 62–63); Madrid, Spain
- Known for: Sculpture
- Movement: Baroque

Alejandro Carnicero (Íscar, Crown of Castile, Spain, 1693 - Madrid, Spain, 1756) was a Spanish sculptor of the Baroque period. He belongs to the Castilian school, following the style of Gregorio Fernández. His artistic language evolved from the 17th century models to a more rococo and gentle style.

He studied in Salamanca with José de Larra Domínguez. He mainly worked in Central and Northern Spain. Three of his sons, Gregorio, Isidro and Antonio Carnicero were also artists.

Carnicero collaborated on a five-year project with José de Larra to work on the choir-stalls of Salamanca Cathedral. The work on another choir-stalls, in the monastery of Guadalupe, is also attributed to him. One of his finest moments as an engraver came in 1728, when the Carmelites of the Third Order commissioned him to create wooden figures of the Virgin of Carmen.

In 1730 Carnicero began carving stone medallions of the kings. The busts were created to be put on display at Salamanca's Plaza Mayor. He followed this with a wooden figure of St Michael for the hospital of Navas del Rey, Castile. From 1745 to 1750 he worked on creating four wooden figures to be put on display at the Len Cathedral. After that Carnicero was commissioned to create three stone statues of Spanish kings for the Palacio Real in Madrid.

== Works ==
Much of his work consisted of religious works:

- Pasos for the Brotherhood of the Vera Cruz in Salamanca
- Virgin of Carmen and Simon Stock in Salamanca
- Works in the Cathedrals of Salamanca, Plasencia, León and Royal Monastery of Guadalupe

An important part of his works consisted of civilian sculptures:

- Medals in the Plaza Mayor de Salamanca
- Kings of Spain in the Royal Palace of Madrid

== Sources ==
- ALBARRÁN MARTÍN, Virginia, El escultor Alejandro Carnicero entre Valladolid y la Corte (1693-1756), Valladolid: Diputación de Valladolid, 2012
- RODRÍGUEZ G. DE CEBALLOS, Alfonso: “Aportaciones a la obra del escultor Alejandro Carnicero”, B.S.A.A., Valladolid, nº 53, 1987, pp. 436 – 441.
- VELASCO BAYÓN, Balbino: “Esculturas de Alejandro Carnicero en Salamanca”, B.S.A.A., Valladolid, nº 40 – 41, 1975, pp. 679 – 683.
