= Andrés García de Quiñones =

Spanish architect

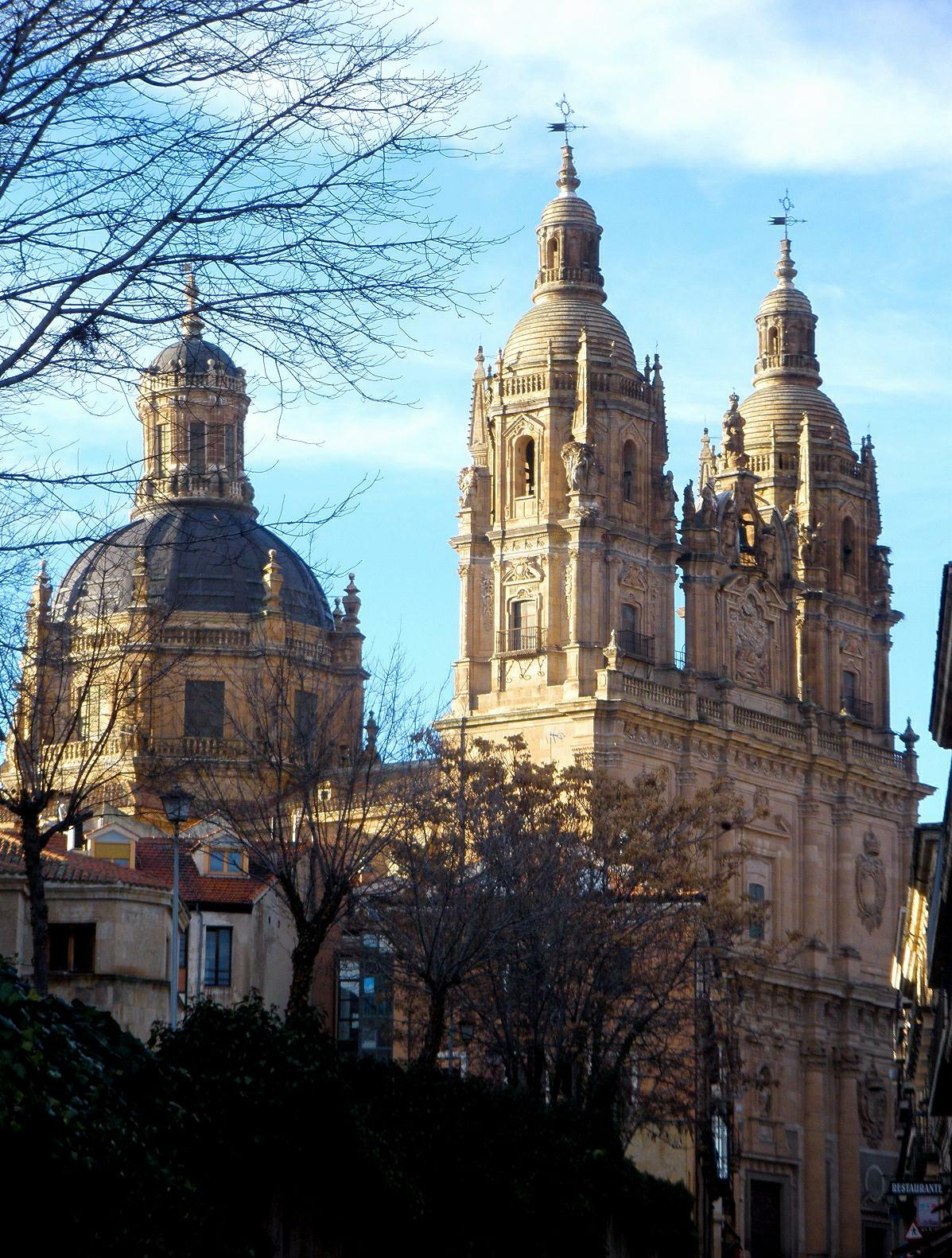
- Towers and dome Clerecia.
- Born: Andrés García de Quiñones; 1709
- Died: 1784 (aged 74–75)
- Known for: Architecture
- Movement: Baroque

Andrés García de Quiñones (1709–1784) was a Spanish architect of the Baroque period, active in Salamanca.

== Works ==
In Salamanca

- Finished the Main square and built the city hall.
- Jesuit seminary of La Clerecia, now the Pontificia university, including:
  - The Towers and the bell-gable.
  - Patio de los estudios (cloister)
  - Main staircase and the school's Great Hall (Theological Hall).
  - Retables of the Visitation and of St. James.

In Betanzos: The General archive of Galicia. Once finished the building was used as a barracks and is now the town hall.

== Sources ==
- Rolf Toman, Barbara Borngässer (1998). The Baroque, Architecture, Sculpture, Painting. Konemman. ISBN 978-3895089176.
