= Antonio Carnicero =

Spanish painter and engraver (1748–1814)

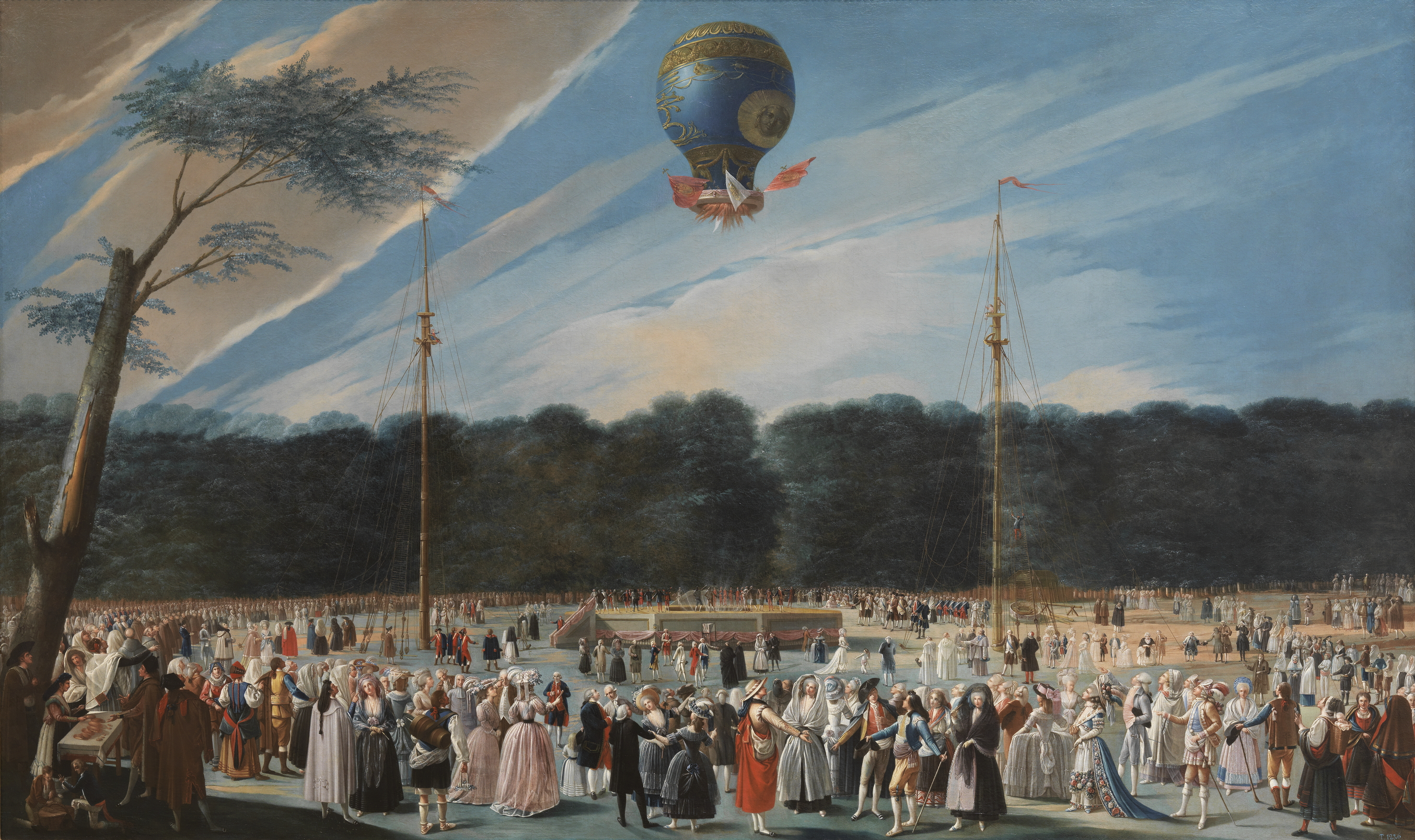
Ascent of the Monsieur Bouclé's Montgolfier Balloon in the Gardens of Aranjuez by Antonio Carnicero, Prado Museum, 1784

Antonio Carnicero (Salamanca, Spain, 1748–Madrid, Spain, 1814) was a Spanish painter of the Neoclassical style. In addition to his paintings, over the course of his career he also produced prints and engravings as well as creating theatrical decorations.

== Family and training ==
Carnicero was born in Salamanca on 10 January 1748. His father, the sculptor Alejandro Carnicero, went to the court of Madrid in 1749 to fulfill a commission for a series of sculptures in the royal palace. Antonio's brothers Gregorio and Isidro were also artists.

After initial training from his father, Carnicero entered the Royal Academy of Fine Arts of San Fernando in 1758. At age 12, he was awarded a scholarship to accompany his brother Isidro to Rome so they could further their study of painting. In 1766 he returned to Madrid, where he began to paint for civil and religious institutions as well as private clients.

== Early career ==
In 1775, Carnicero collaborated with Joseph del Castillo in the execution of tapestry cartoons for the royal household. He also worked as a theatrical decorator for performances at the Teatro de la Cruz and the Teatro del Principe. Between 1780 and 1782, he provided illustrations for a project of the Royal Spanish Academy to prepare a deluxe printing of Don Quixote, edited by Joaquín Ibarra, that became a milestone edition of the Spanish literary classic.

His ability as an artist and painter gained a growing reputation with a colorful series Costumes of Spain and the Indies (1777), portraits of illustrious Spanish personages (1788), and a series of etchings on bullfighting (1790). He scored a major success with his work The Coronation of King Alfonso XI and Queen Mary, His Wife for a competition to decorate the Royal Basilica of San Francisco el Grande. Two other well-known works depict the contemporary sensation of early hot air balloon flights. These paintings might depict one of two events: the first manned flight on 21 November 1783, by Jean-François Pilâtre de Rozier and the Marquis d'Arlandes in Paris, or more likely a later demonstration from 5 June 1784, which took place in the gardens of Aranjuez in the presence of the Spanish court.

== Royal appointment ==
In 1796, Carnicero was named chamber painter for King Charles IV of Spain. This came after several previous failed attempts to secure a court appointment (in 1788, 1792 and 1793). From that point on, he worked mainly as a portraitist of the royal family and leading ministers at court, such as painting a young Manuel Godoy or Pedro Rodríguez de Campomanes.

He taught drawing to the children of the royal family, especially the future Ferdinand VII, then Prince of Asturias. On account of his relationship with the Prince, Carnicero drew suspicion of being involved in the El Escorial Conspiracy of 1807 to dethrone Charles IV. As a result, Carnicero was arrested on 7 November and detained for over ten days before being released.

As Spain came under Napoleonic rule, beginning in 1809 Carnicero, like Francisco Goya, was required to work for Joseph Bonaparte to maintain his position as court painter. After the restoration of the Bourbons, Carnicero was put on trial for removal from his office on the grounds that he had served the foreign king. An appeal to reinstate him came too late when Carnicero died in Madrid on 21 August 1814, just days before an amnesty was proclaimed by Ferdinand VII.
