= Pedro Hernández (sculptor) =

Spanish sculptor, drawer and engraver

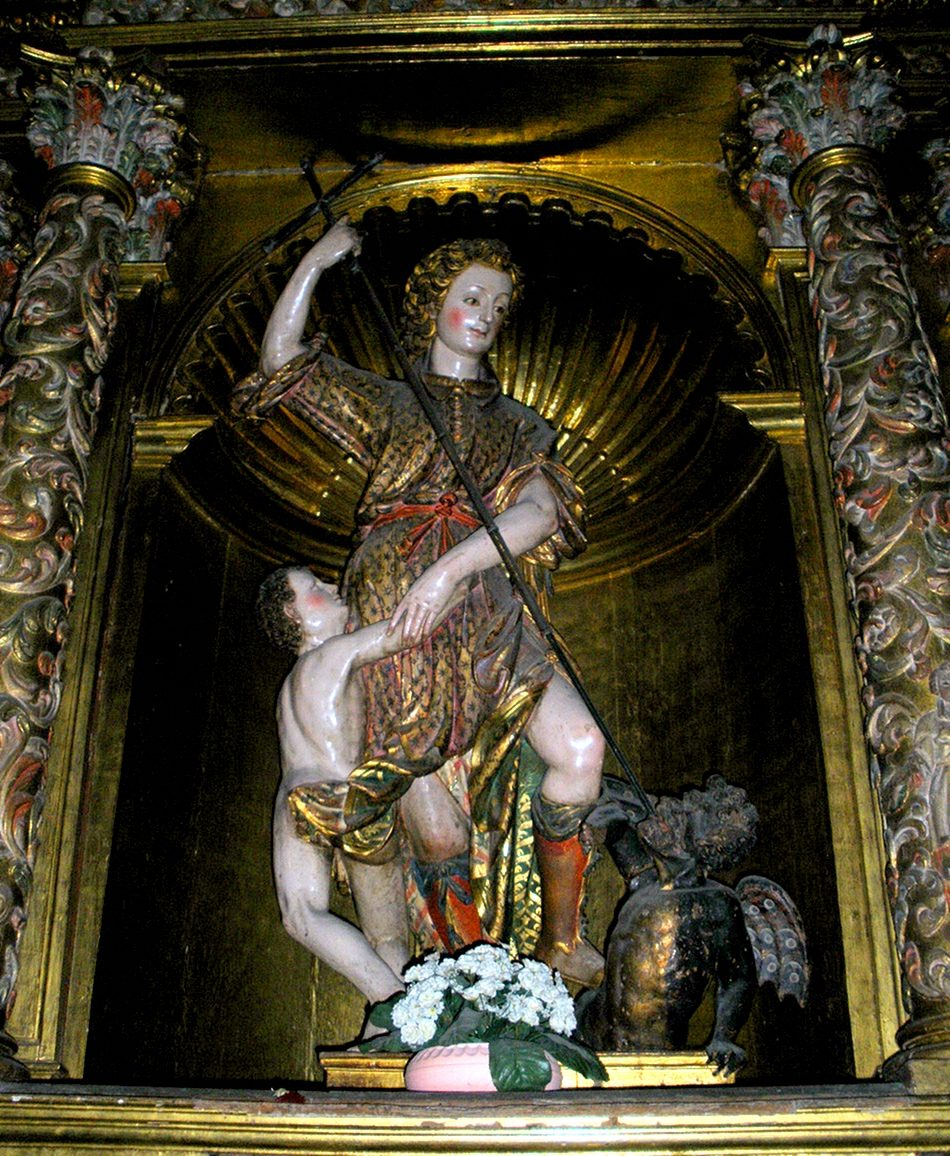
- Guardian Angel; Sancti Spiritus Church, Salamanca
- Born: 1585? Salamanca, Spain
- Died: 1665; Salamanca, Spain
- Known for: Sculpture
- Movement: Mannerism, Baroque

Pedro Hernández (Salamanca, 1585? – 1665) was a Spanish sculptor, drawer and engraver. He belongs to the Castilian school, being a contemporary artist of Gregorio Fernández. He mainly created religious works. His artistic language evolved from the Mannerism to a full Baroque style. He worked in the province of Salamanca.

== Works ==
Sancti Spiritus Church

- Guardian Angel

Brotherhood of Vera Cruz

- Sainte Helena
- The Descent from the Cross
- The three Marys and the Holy Sepulchre

San Julián Church

- The Annunciation (atrib.)

Descargamaría Chapel, (Cáceres)

- Jesus carrying the cross
