= Plaza Mayor, Salamanca =

Square in Salamanca, Spain

Coordinates: 40°57′54″N 5°39′51″W

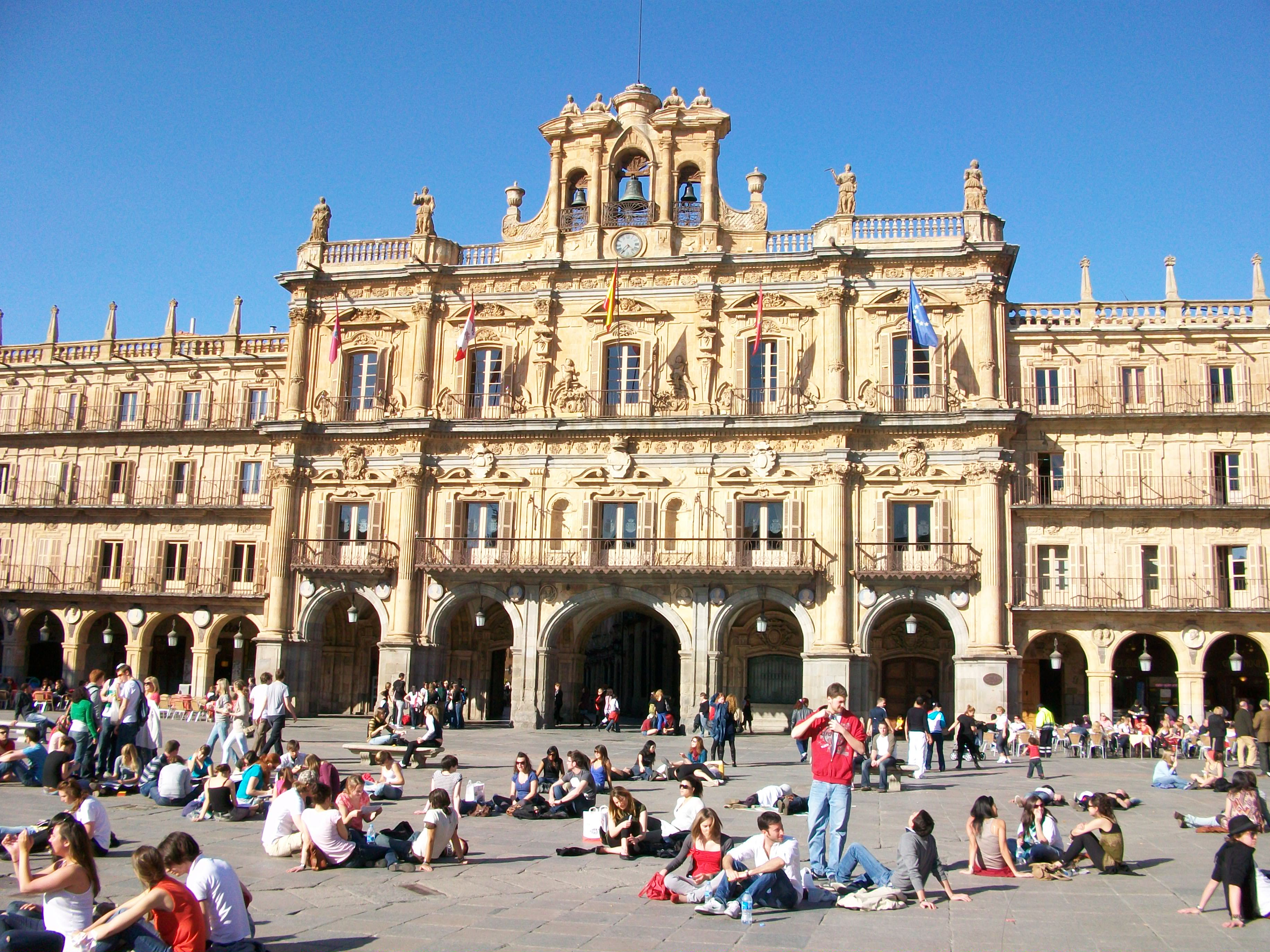
The front of the plaza, showing the clock tower in the background and social gatherings in the front

The Plaza Mayor (English Main Plaza) is a large plaza located in the center of Salamanca, Spain used as a public square. It was built in the traditional Spanish baroque style and is a popular gathering area. It is lined by restaurants, ice cream parlors, tourist shops, jewelry stores and a pharmacy along its perimeter except in front of the city hall. It is considered the heart of Salamanca and is widely regarded as one of the most beautiful plazas in Spain. It is connected to the shopping area Calle del Toro from the northeast, Calle de Zamora from the north, the restaurants on Calle de Concejo from the northwest, Calle del Prior and the small Calle de la Caja de Ahorros from the west as well as Plaza del Corrillo from the south.

== History ==
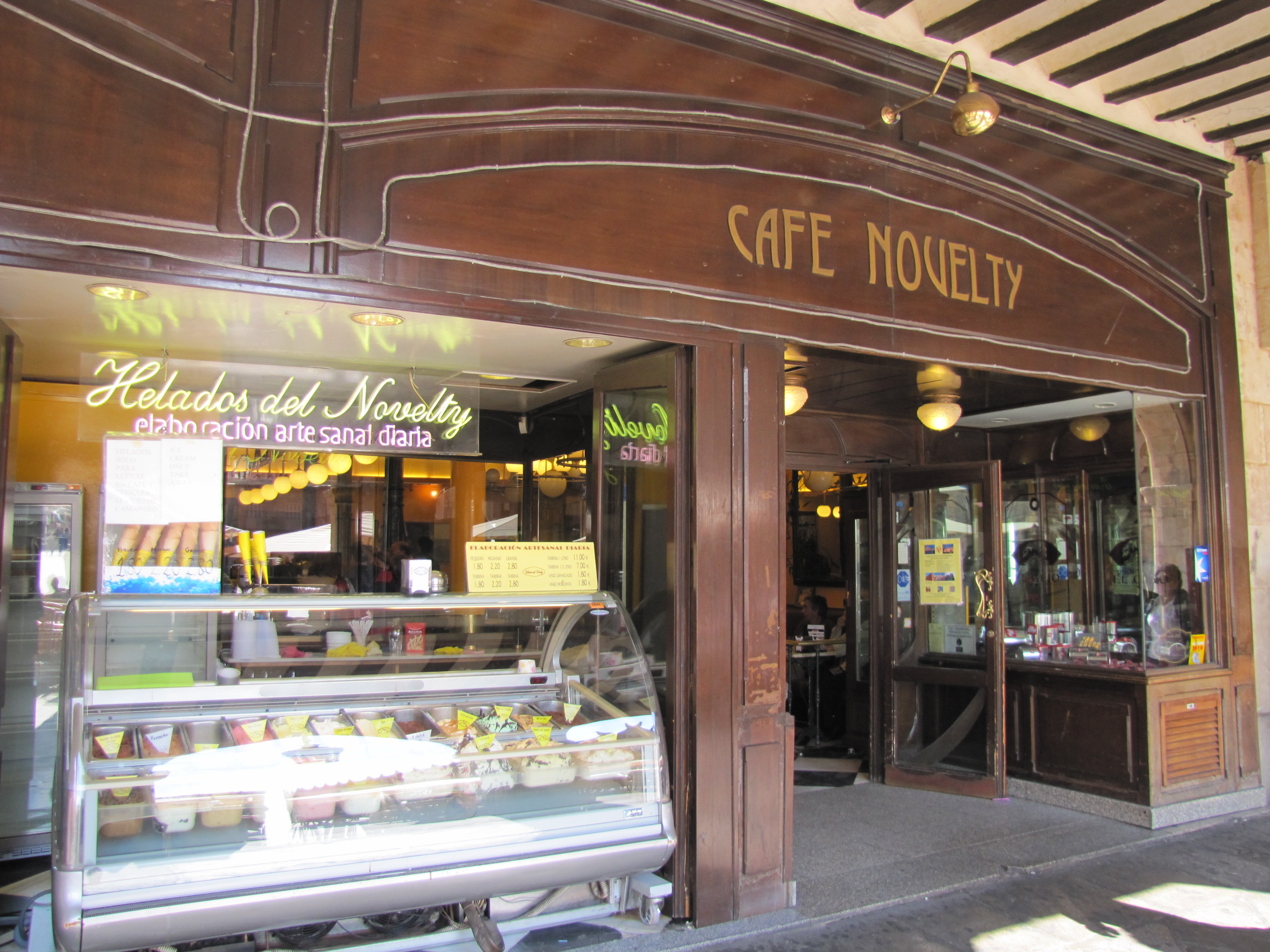
The entrance to the Café Novelty, founded in 1905, from the Plaza Mayor.

Construction of the plaza began in 1729 and was completed in 1755. Felipe V ordered the construction of the plaza to be used for bullfighting and was designed by the Churriguera family in sandstone. It had been used for bullfighting up until the mid-19th century, one hundred years after being completed. The construction took place in two phases: the first was between 1729 and 1735 and the second was between 1750 and 1755. The first phase was built under the direction of Alberto Churriguera while the second phase was built under the direction of Manuel de Larra Churriguera, his nephew. Finally, Andrés Garcia de Quiñones built the City Hall.

=== World heritage site ===
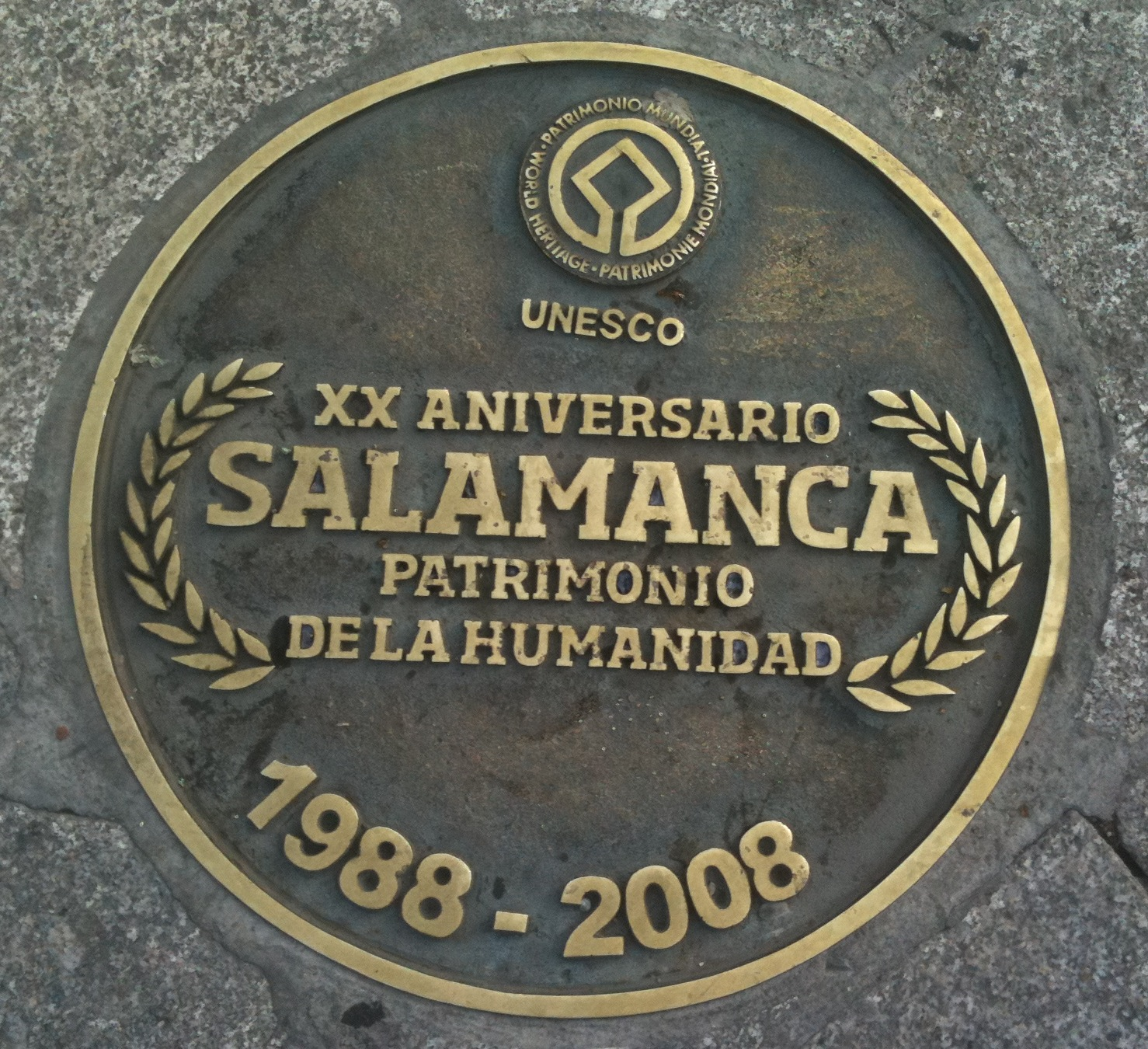
Plaque in the center of the plaza, which says Twentieth anniversary [of] Salamanca patrimony of humanity 1988-2008.

In 1988, UNESCO declared the old city of Salamanca a World Heritage Site. Today, there is a plaque placed in the center of the plaza marking its significance to boast the plaza's baroque-style beauty. Salamanca is known as La Dorada, "The Golden City" because of the glow of its sandstone buildings, which the Plaza Mayor represents at its core.

== Design ==
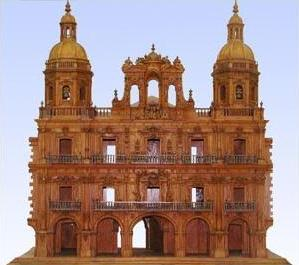
Model showing the 2 towers never completed

The plaza is an irregular square and none of its facades measure the same height. The plaza's walls have three floors above its ground terrace level except for the main facade portion. The plaza has 6 entrances leading to different streets from opposite areas of the plaza and features a clock (El Reloj) tower and 5 larger facade entrances on only 2 floors on the frontal area under the clock. It features 88 arches raised on stout pillars and is decorated medallions on its many spandrels. The plaza also has 247 balconies of which now belong to private residents.

The plaza was originally designed to have 2 towers on each side of the clock, but were never completed based on fears that the portion would not be able to support the weight and thus the 1745 plan was used instead. The city hall is also located on this side of the plaza, also built in the baroque style with 5 granite arches and a steeple. Size, the square is approximately 70m X 70m.

== Movie location ==
- Vantage Point

== See also ==
- Plaza Mayor, Valladolid
- Plaza Mayor, Madrid
