= Churriguera =

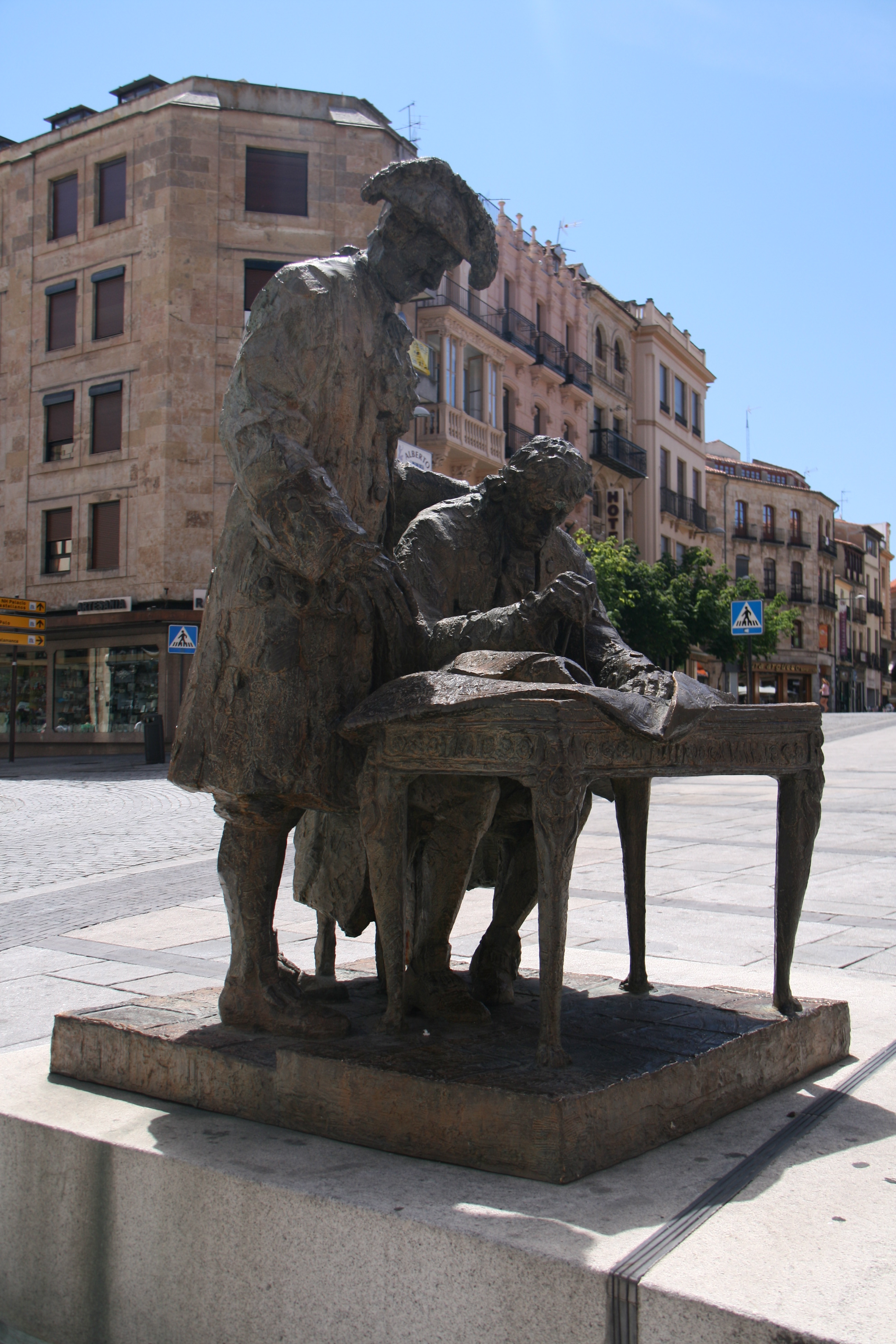
Sculptures by Rodrigo Caballero y Llanes and Alberto Churriguera - Anniversary

The Churriguera family consisted of at least two generations of Spanish sculptors and architects, originally from Barcelona, but who had their greatest impact in Salamanca. The highly decorated Churrigueresque style of architectural construction is named after the family.

The family of José Benito de Churriguera (1665–1725) were sculptors, already known for their elaborate architectural decorations. When José Benito began designing buildings, the decorations became even more extravagant and exaggerated. Later both his sculptor brothers, Joaquin (1674–1724) and Alberto (1676–1750) were to become architects and the family tradition that was carried on by the next generation had begun.
