= Toledo Cathedral =

Roman Catholic cathedral in Toledo, Spain

- Primatial Metropolitan Cathedral of Saint Mary of the Assumption
- Spanish: Catedral Primada Metropolitana de Santa María
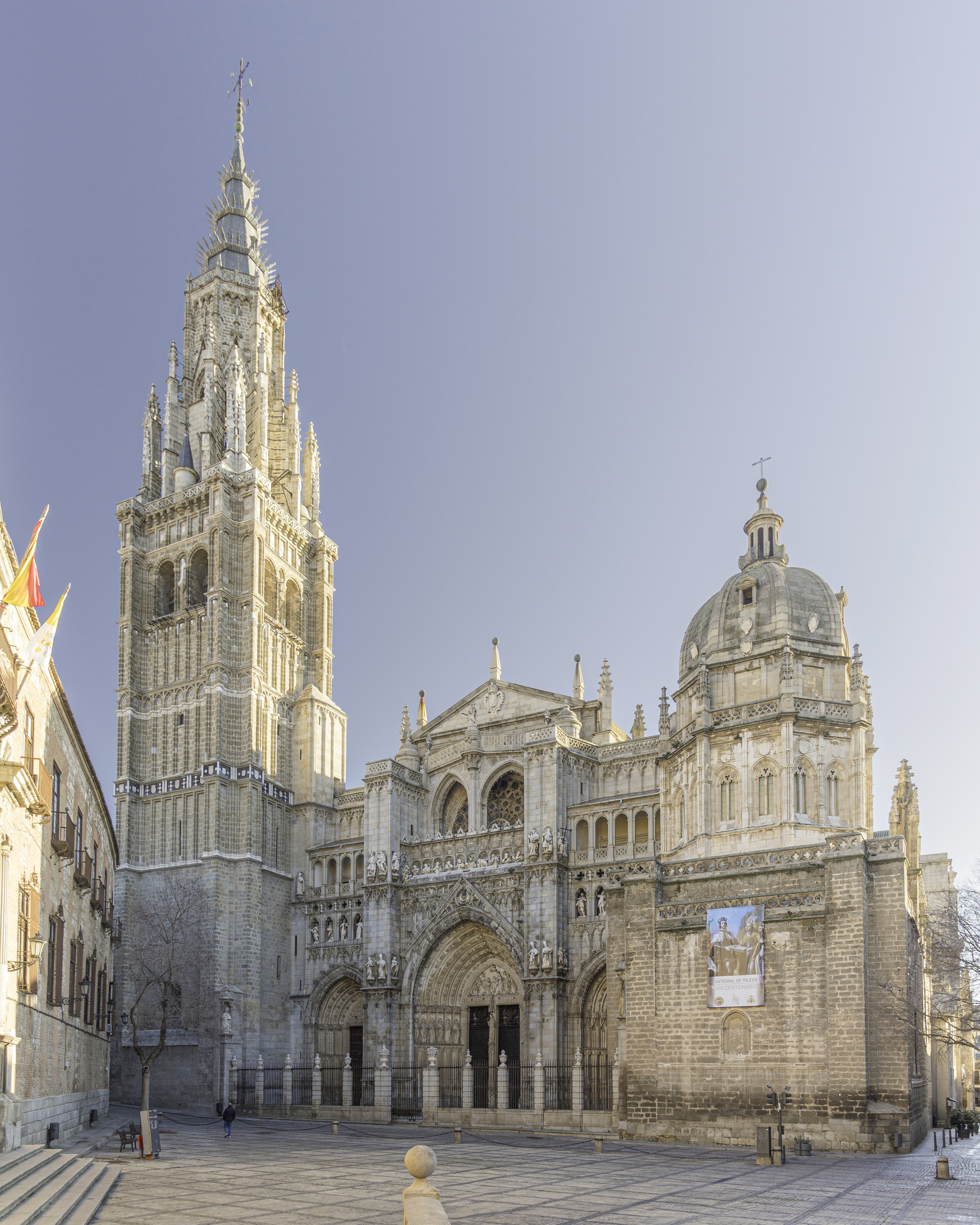
- West façade in 2025
- Toledo Cathedral
- 39°51′25.5″N 4°01′26″W
- Location: Toledo
- Address: 1, Cardenal Cisneros Street
- Country: Spain
- Denomination: Catholic
- Website: catedralprimada.es

History
- Status: Cathedral
- Dedication: Mary, mother of Jesus

Architecture
- Architect(s): Master Martín; Petrus Petri
- Style: Gothic
- Groundbreaking: 1227
- Completed: 1493

Specifications
- Length: 120 metres (390 ft)
- Width: 59 metres (194 ft)
- Height: 44.5 metres (146 ft)

Administration
- Metropolis: Toledo

Clergy
- Archbishop: Francisco Cerro Chaves

UNESCO World Heritage Site
- Criteria: Cultural: (i)(ii)(iii)(iv)
- Designated: 1986 (10th session)
- Part of: Historic City of Toledo
- Reference no.: 379

Spanish Cultural Heritage
- Type: Non-movable
- Criteria: Monument
- Designated: 14 May 1909
- Reference no.: RI-51-0000097

The Primatial Metropolitan Cathedral of Saint Mary of the Assumption (Spanish: Catedral Primada Metropolitana de Santa María de la Asunción), is a Roman Catholic cathedral in Toledo, Spain. It is the seat of the Metropolitan Archdiocese of Toledo. Since 1088, it holds the honorific title of Primatial, granted by Urban II, establishing a higher rank over the rest in the Iberian Peninsula.

The cathedral of Toledo is one of the three 13th-century High Gothic cathedrals in Spain and is considered, in the opinion of some authorities, to be the magnum opus of the Gothic style in Spain. It was begun in 1226 under the rule of Ferdinand III, and the last Gothic contributions were made in the 15th century when, in 1493, the vaults of the central nave were finished during the time of the Catholic Monarchs. It was modeled after the Bourges Cathedral, although its five naves plan is a consequence of the constructors' intention to cover all of the sacred space of the former city mosque with the cathedral, and of the former sahn with the cloister. It also combines some characteristics of the Mudéjar style, mainly in the cloister, with the presence of multifoiled arches in the triforium. The spectacular incorporation of light and the structural achievements of the ambulatory vaults are some of its more remarkable aspects. It is built with white limestone from the quarries of Olihuelas, near Toledo.

It is popularly known as Dives Toletana (meaning The Rich Toledan in Latin). The Mozarabic Chapel in the Cathedral of Toledo still uses the Hispano-Mozarabic Rite and music.

== History ==
=== Origins ===
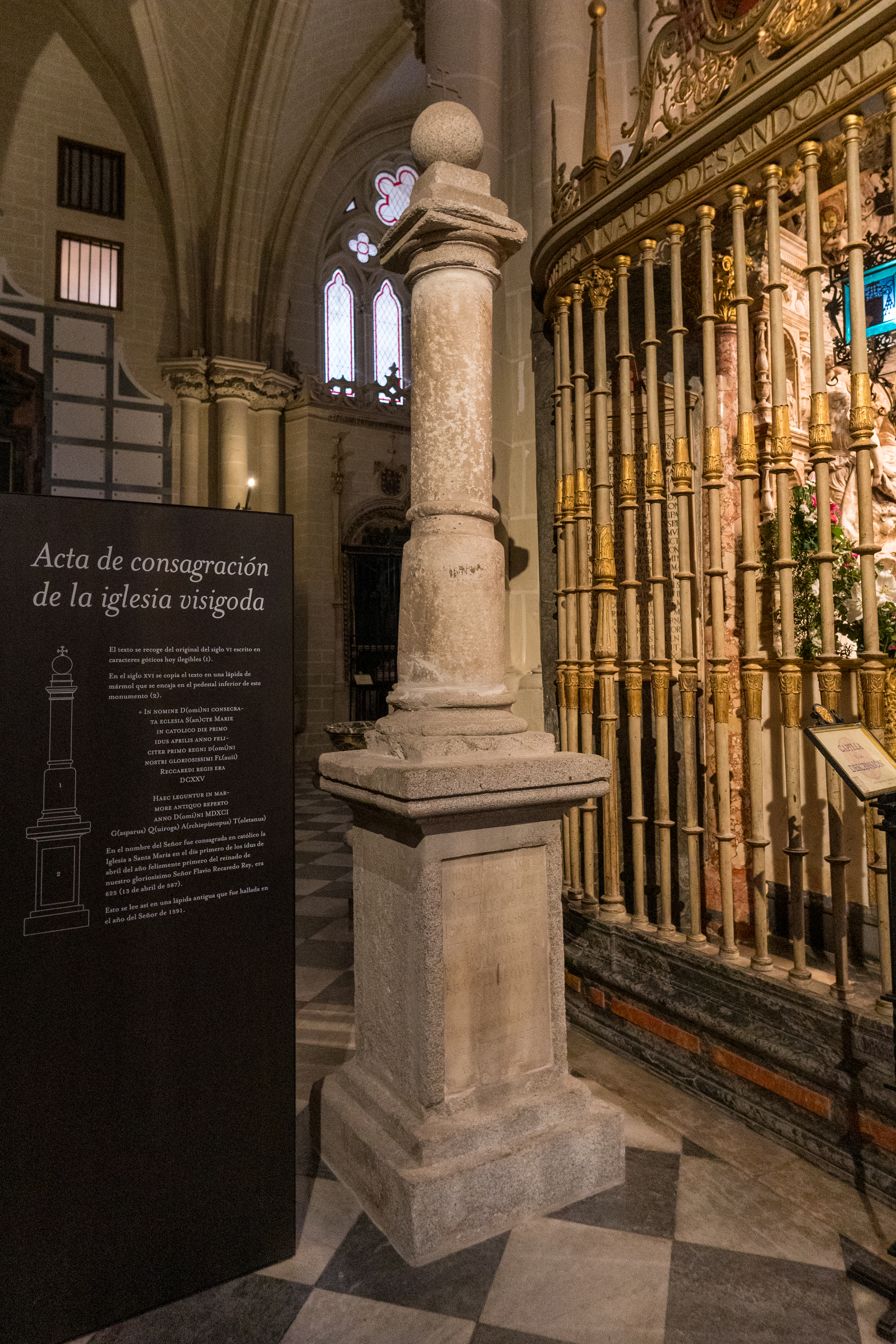
Pillar stating the consecration of the Visigothic church

For many years, an unwritten popular tradition has held that there was originally a church from the era of the first Archbishop Eugene (Saint Eugene of Toledo) located in the same place as the present cathedral. This church was consecrated for a second time in the year 587, after having undergone some alterations, as testified by a 16th-century inscription preserved on a pillar in the rear of the nave of the church which states:

In the name of the Lord the Church of Saint Mary was consecrated as Catholic, the first day of the ides of April, in the joyful first year of the reign of our most glorious king Flavius Reccared, Era 625 [13 of April of 587].

The city had been the episcopal seat of Visigothic Spain. The numerous Councils of Toledo attest to its important ecclesiastical past. Also, the abjuration of Arianism on the part of Reccared occurred there. The Muslim invasion did not immediately eliminate the Christian presence and the bishopric remained established in the church of Saint Mary of Alfizén.

The Visigothic church was torn down and the main mosque of the city of Toledo was erected in its place. Some investigators point out that the prayer hall of the mosque corresponds with the layout of the five naves of the current cathedral; the sahn would coincide with part of the current cloister and the chapel of Saint Peter and the minaret with the belltower. Using certain archeological data it is possible to discern an Islamic column mounted inside the chapel of Saint Lucy; the marble shafts that decorate the exterior of the choir are an improvement of an old Muslim construction, and the intertwined arches of caliphate style in the triforium of the main chapel and of the ambulatory coincide with the Muslim construction tradition of Cordova.

=== The Cathedral of Alfonso VI ===
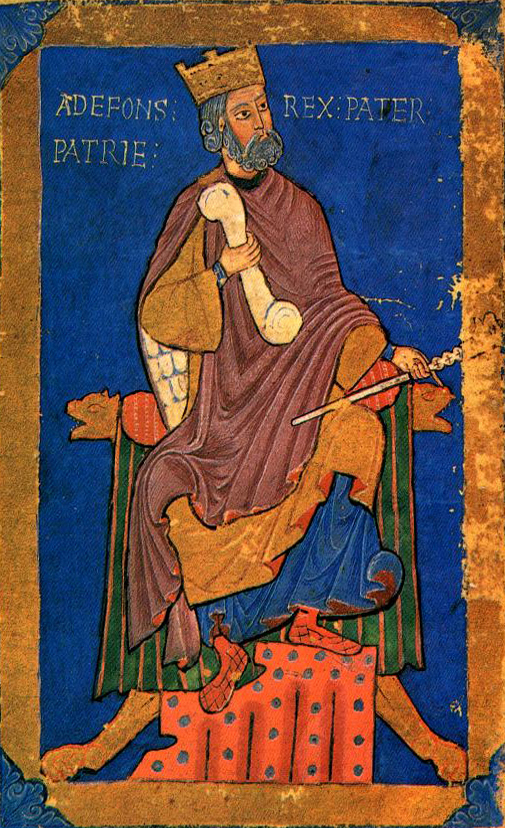
Alfonso VI of León and Castile.

The city of Toledo was reconquered by Alfonso VI, King of León and Castile, in 1085. One of the points of the Muslim capitulation that made possible the transfer of the city without bloodshed was the king's promise to conserve and respect their institutions of higher learning, as well as the customs and religion of the Muslim population which had coexisted with the larger Mozarabic population. Naturally, the preservation of the main mosque was integral to this compromise. Shortly thereafter, the king had to depart on matters of state, leaving the city in charge of his wife Constance and the abbot of the monastery of Sahagún, Bernard of Sedirac (or Bernard of Cluny), who had been elevated to the rank of archbishop of Toledo. These two, in mutual accord and taking advantage of the absence of the king, undertook an unfortunate action which, as told by the priest Mariana in his General History of Spain, almost provoked a Muslim uprising and consequent ruin of the recently conquered city.

On 25 October 1087, the archbishop in cooperation with Queen Constance sent an armed contingent to seize the mosque by force. They proceeded to install a provisional altar and hung a bell in the minaret, following Christian custom to 'cast out the filthiness of the law of Mohammed'. The priest Mariana writes that king Alfonso VI was so irritated by these events that neither the archbishop nor the queen were able to prevent him from ordering the execution of all the active participants. Legend tells that the local Muslim populace itself helped restore peace, with its chief negotiator, faqih Abu Walid, requesting the king to show mercy, and imploring his fellow townsmen to accept the Christian usurpation as legitimate. In gratitude for this gesture, the Cathedral Chapter dedicated a homage to Walid and ordered his effigy to be placed on one of the pillars in the main chapel, in this way perpetuating his memory. Thus the conversion of the Toledan mosque was upheld and it remained consecrated as a Christian cathedral.

The building plans of the former mosque have not been preserved nor is the appearance of the structure known, but taking into account the preserved vestiges of mosques in other Spanish cities (in Seville, Jaén, Granada, Málaga, and the Mosque-Cathedral of Córdoba), it may be supposed that it was a columnary building, with horseshoe arcades on top of columns in revision of earlier Roman and Visigothic construction. It is possible that it appeared very much like the Church of the Savior of Toledo, previously a mosque.

King Alfonso VI made important donations to the new church. On 18 December 1086, the cathedral was placed under the advocacy of María and it was granted villas, hamlets, mills and one third of the revenues of all the rest of the churches of the city. The first royal privilege that is preserved is a prayer in Latin, beginning:

Ego Disponente Deo Adefonsus, Esperie imperator, condeco sedi metropolitane, scilicet, Sancte Marie urbis Toletane honorem integrum ut decent abere pontificalem sedem secundum quod preteritis fuit constitutum a sanctis patribus...

In English:

I, Alfonsus, Emperor of Hesperia by the disposition of God, grant to the metropolitan See, that is, the church of Saint Mary in the city of Toledo, the complete honour that she should have the pontifical see according to what before was constituted by the holy fathers…

Pope Urban II recognised this church in 1088 as the primatial cathedral over the rest of the kingdom. The mosque-cathedral remained intact until the 13th century, when in the year 1222 a Papal bull issued by the Pope authorised the construction of a new cathedral which was begun in 1224 (or 1225). The official ceremony of the laying of the foundation stone took place in 1226 (other sources say 1227), with the presence of King Ferdinand the Saint. Throughout the 13th century the cathedral's income tax was raised through the previous incorporation of Alcalá de Henares into its archiepiscopal territories in 1129.

=== The Cathedral of the Archbishop Ximénez de Rada ===
The layout of the cathedral as now seen was set in the 13th century, while Rodrigo Ximénez de Rada was archbishop of Toledo and during the reign of a young Ferdinand III of Castile. Commencement of the work was delayed until the king could be present at the official ceremonial cornerstone-laying (1227). Ximénez de Rada was elected bishop of Toledo in 1209, and thenceforth he defended the primacy of the Toledan See before the Papal authority. He aimed to build a grand cathedral, worthy of the city he governed. When he came to office, the mosque-cathedral had ample space, but with a low roof, making the interior noisy. The cathedral was aged; some sections had been demolished by his predecessor, and the structure lacked the slenderness and height of other religious edifices of similar importance. Ximénez de Rada became the enthusiastic promoter for a new cathedral, to be built in contemporary Gothic style. He was so enthusiastic about the project and involved himself so much in it that it was later falsely rumoured that he was the designer-architect of the cathedral. The archbishop spent a few years maintaining and reinforcing the old structure in hopes that his dream would be realised.

== The building ==
Plan of the cathedral.

The structure of the building is greatly influenced by the French Gothic style of the 13th century, but adapted to Spanish taste. It measures 120 metres (390 ft) in length by 59 metres (194 ft) in width and 44.5 metres (146 ft) high. It consists of five naves with transept and double ambulatory. The outer naves present an odd anomaly in being a little wider than the other two. The oldest part of the building is the sanctuary, which maintains in its architecture the original triforia that extended along the length of the naves and were removed in one of the many alterations that the cathedral underwent. Still in the Gothic period, these triforia were replaced with large stained-glass windows. Those triforia that survive in the sanctuary are of Mudéjar influence. The lowest section is made of cusped arches that rest on paired columns and the upper section presents interlaced arches typical of Mudéjar. It is not known if these Mudéjar themes existed in the previous mosque and were copied as a reminder or if they were added in one of the improvements of the stonework, as something original and tasteful.

In the sanctuary, one encounters the double ambulatory, which is doubled as would correspond to a ground plan of five naves. This double ambulatory is of grand proportions and is enriched with architectural elements and an original vaulting. The new sections of the chapels were resolved with alternate plans of rectangles and triangles, which allowed for each chapel to be of a different size, rectangular plans being larger and triangular plans smaller. This method of distributing the sanctuary can be seen in the French cathedrals of Paris, Bourges and Le Mans, the last cathedral being the most similar in appearance, although the three are more slender in aspect than the Spanish cathedral. The various reforms that were made over time altered the arrangement of some of the chapels; for example, in one case just one chapel was reconstructed in the former space of three.

The vaults of the naves are quadripartite except for those of the transept and the chancel which are reinforced with tiercerons.

=== The master builders and their patrons ===
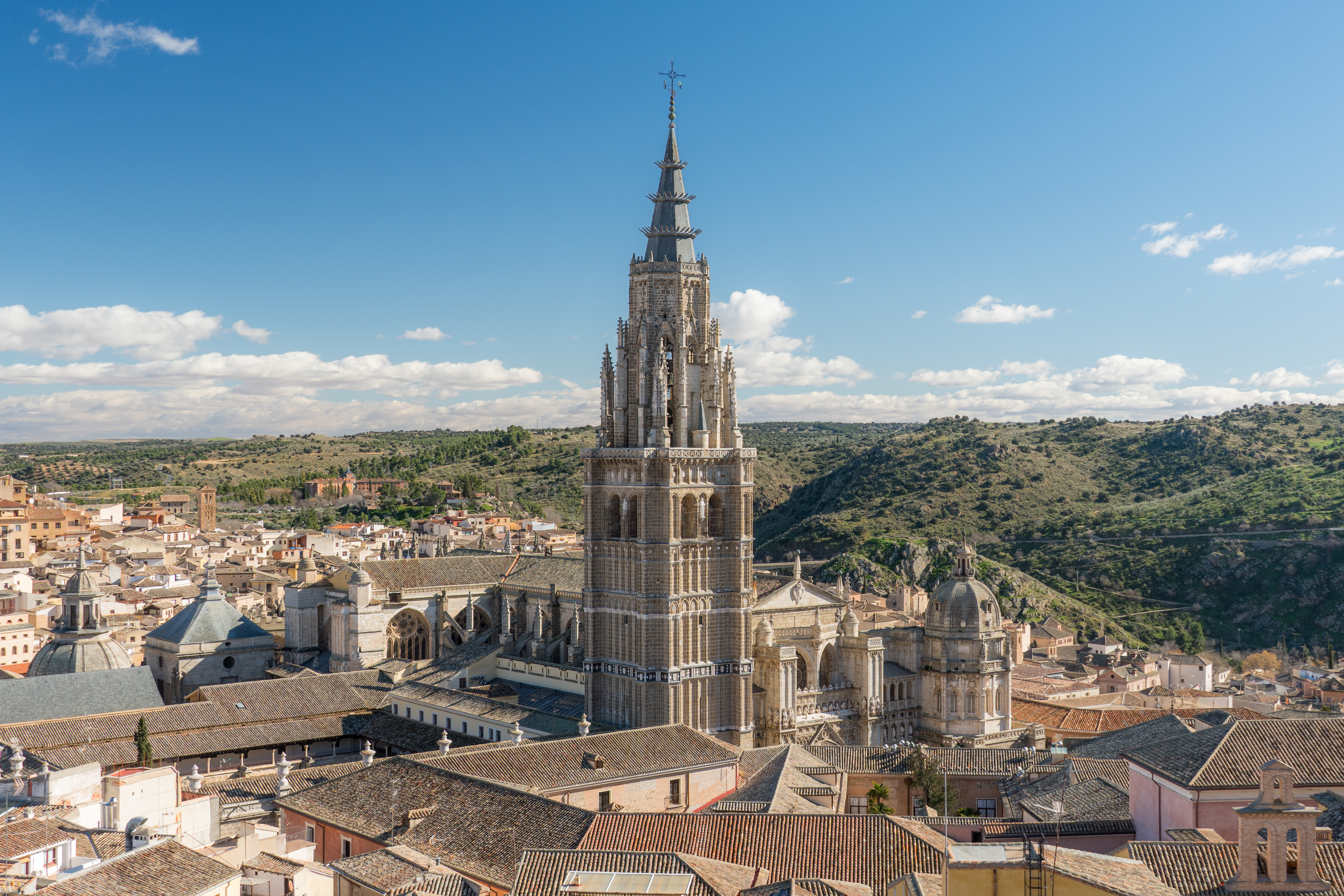
The cathedral seen from the Church of San Ildefonso

For centuries it was held with complete certainty that the first master architect of the cathedral of Toledo was Petrus Petri (Spanish: Pedro Pérez). Such certainty was based on the only existing testimony regarding the authorship, a legend inscribed in vulgar Latin still visible on a tombstone:

English translation: Petrus Petri, deceased in 1291, master of the church of Saint Mary of Toledo, whose fame was propagated by his good examples and customs, who constructed this temple and rests here, for what an admirable building he made, he will not feel the wrath of God.

Towards the middle of the 20th century, the bishop of Ciudad Real thoroughly investigated this claim and brought to light a series of documents which demonstrated the existence of a first master prior to Petrus Petri called Master Martín, married to María Gómez and certainly of French origin, who had been summoned by Ximénez de Rada. One of the documents is dated to 1227 and names "a master Martín of the work of Saint Mary of Toledo". Another document lists income collected by the cathedral in 1234 and records again the name of "Master Martín of the work", of whom it is also written that he was a tenant of a house associated with the cathedral. In later writings there appear the names of Martín (stonemason) and Juan Martín (master of stonemasons), who are believed to be relatives of each other. No new documents have appeared, so at present this master Martín is accredited as the first architect. To this argument it must be added that the date of the beginning of construction does not correlate with the age of Petrus Petri who during those years must have been too young to be an architect.

Studies released after this discovery indicate that the master Martín would be the designer of the chapels of the ambulatory and upon his departure by death or by absence the supervision of the work was taken up by master Petrus who finished the ambulatories and constructed the triforia in Toledan style. Towards the end of the 20th century, the sanctuary and two sections of the naves of the south side were completed.

Near the end of the 14th century the existence of a master Rodrigo Alfonso is apparently documented; he laid the first stone of the cloister in 1389, under the patronage of Archbishop Pedro Tenorio, who died ten years later. The archbishop occupied himself with many works of the cathedral, such as the chapel of Saint Blaise in the cloister which is famous for the artistic richness of its frescos from the school of Siena.

The next master of whom there is information was Alvar Martínez (in some sources called González), who was quantity surveyor of the Olihuelas limestone quarries at the boundary of Olías del Rey. He is the designer of the west façade whose construction was begun in 1418. Changes made in 1787 obscure the original appearance of this façade. He was also the designer of the only tower of the cathedral, which was built during the office of Archbishop Juan Martínez de Contreras, whose coat of arms appears in the frieze that crowns the first section. The crowning of the tower was done by another great master sculptor, the Fleming Hanequin de Bruselas, who moulded the coat of arms of the succeeding archbishop Juan de Cerezuela. With Hanequin came a group of illustrious masters: Egas Cueman (de Bruselas' brother), Enrique Egas, and Juan Guas; these worked on façades, chapels, and sumptuary works, completing the work done in the Gothic idiom with their labor. The vaults at the footing of the central nave were closed in 1493, under the direction of Juan Guas and Enrique Egas, with the patronage and supervision of Cardinal Mendoza.

=== Great patrons of the 16th century: works and artists ===
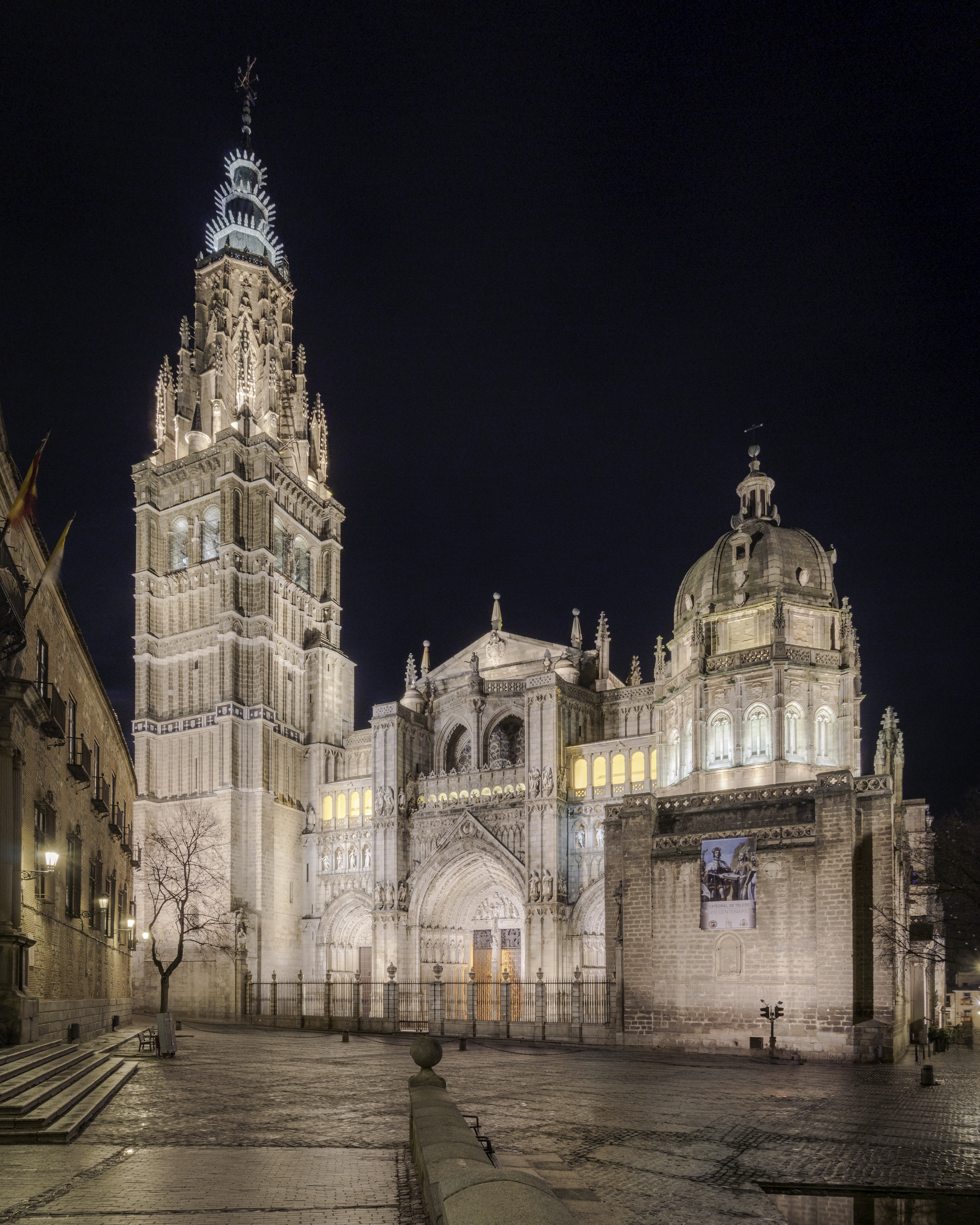
Night view

During the 16th, 17th and 18th centuries, various modifications were made to the cathedral according to the new styles: architectural works including magnificent portals and chapels, and sumptuous works of sculpture and painting. The 16th century was the golden age of Toledo, which consequently came to be called the Imperial City. The best informed and most active patrons lived during this century. It was the archbishop-governors who, in the absence of the kings, attended to the city and added to its magnificence. In 1493, at the end of the 15th century, Cardinal Mendoza supervised the closing of the last vault of the cathedral and expressed in his will his desire to be buried in the presbytery. In the first decade of the 16th century, the cenotaph was built in Renaissance style. This work is attributed to a team working under the leadership of Domenico Fancelli, although some authorities attribute it to Andrea Sansovino.

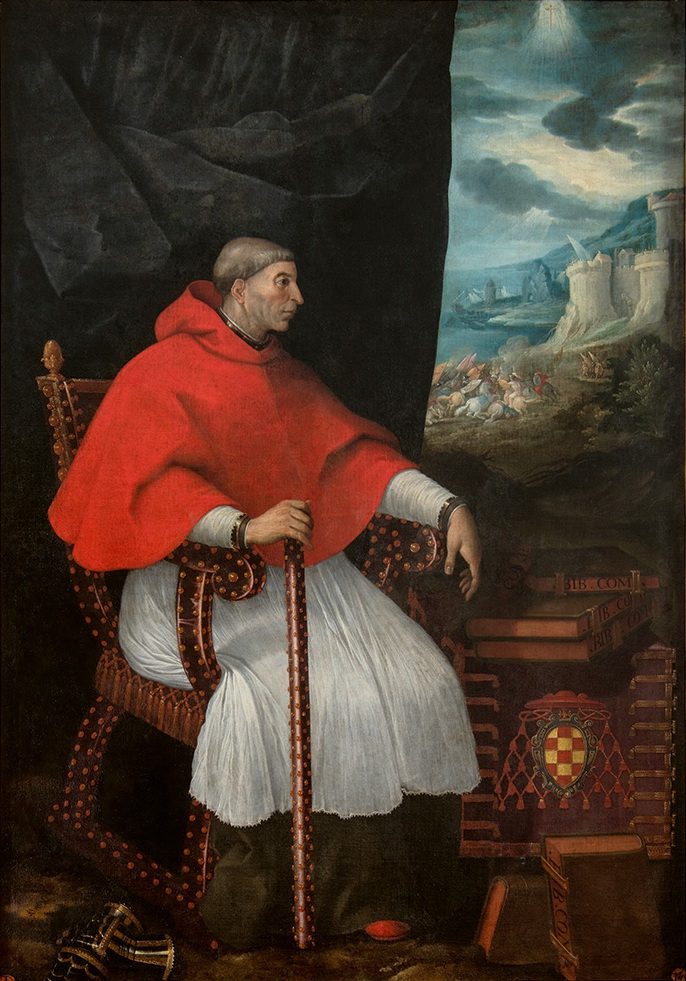
Cardinal Ximénes de Cisneros

Cardinal Cisneros occupied the cardinalate office for twenty-two years; under his influence and sponsorship important works were done (perhaps the most important was the Mozarabic chapel), realised by masters of the stature of Juan Francés (reja, or the ironwork screen, of the Mozarabic chapel), Enrique Egas, Juan de Borgoña (paintings of the Mozarabic chapel) and its grandmaster Pedro de Gumiel. Cisneros also ordered the magnificent main altarpiece to be built (the work of Diego Copín de Holanda) and the high cloister for the canonical community, plus the library. He was followed by Guillermo de Croy, the Chief of the Spanish treasury (contador mayor), who never resided in Toledo. Alfonso de Fonseca y Acevedo (who had been archbishop of Santiago de Compostela) was the promoter of the New Kings chapel, which was planned by the architect Alonso de Covarrubias. Paintings by Mariano Salvador Maella were added in the 18th century.

With the ascent of Bishop Juan Tavera, the Toledan Renaissance reached its height of splendor. Under his governance, the choir of Alonso Berruguete and Felipe Vigarny, the interior façades of the transept, the chapel of Saint John or of the Treasure and other façades and adornments were constructed. During Archbishop Juan Martínez Siliceo's time in office, the cathedral was adorned with the screen of the main chapel, the work of Francisco de Villalpando.

Cardinal Gaspar de Quiroga was responsible for the architectural complex of the chapel of the Tabernacle, the Reliquary and the courtyard and house of the treasurer. The renderings and plans were drawn by the grandmaster Nicolás de Vergara el Mozo. To construct this complex, the Hospital of the King was torn down and rebuilt on its former site; these works were carried out under the supervision of Cardinal Bernardo de Sandoval y Rojas and the architect Nicolás de Vergara in the 17th century.

== Exterior ==
=== Main façade and the great portals ===
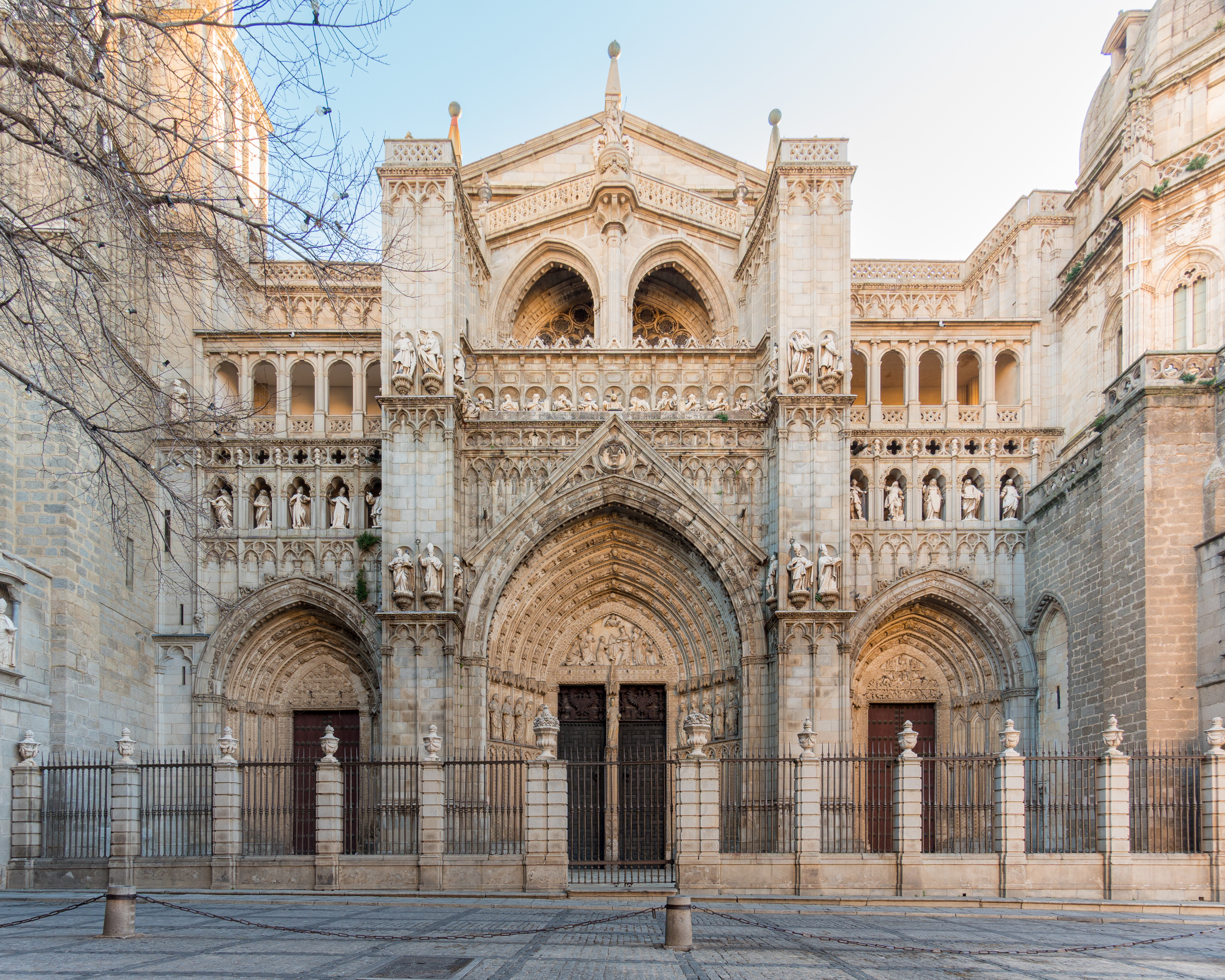
Puerta del Perdón (Portal of Forgiveness)

The main façade faces an irregular square containing the town hall and the Archbishop's Palace. To the left is the bell tower and to the right the projecting Mozarabic chapel that occupies the place where the second tower was to be built.

To the left of the main façade rises the only tower of the cathedral. The dome that is seen to the right belongs to the Mozarabic chapel which was commissioned by Cardinal Cisneros. The tower has two parts: the lower part, of square cross-section, was designed by Alvar Martínez; the upper, octagonal part was designed by Hanequin de Bruselas. It is topped by a spire.

The main façade has three portals, known as, respectively, Puerta del Perdón (Portal of Forgiveness, in the centre), Puerta del Juicio Final (Portal of the Last Judgment, to the right) and Puerta del Infierno (Portal of Hell, to the left). The Portal of Forgiveness belongs to the 15th century—it was begun under the direction of Alvar Martínez in 1418. It is so called because indulgences were granted to penitents who entered through it. These days it is always closed and is used only on special occasions and upon the investiture of new archbishops of the primatial cathedral. It has one great arch with six Gothic archivolts. The decoration consists of typical Gothic iconography, with the figure of the Saviour in the mullion and an apostolates in the jambs. In the tympanum, the Virgin gives the chasuble to Saint Ildephonsus, a particularly special theme for the cathedral which is repeated in the interior in the chapels and paintings. The leaves of the doors measure more than five meters in height and are covered by elaborately fashioned bronze plates, which date to the 14th century. The Portal of the Last Judgement is the oldest of the three, and represents, as its name suggests, the Last Judgment.

The Portal of Hell, in contrast, does not contain figurative motifs, only floral decoration. It is also known as the Portal of the Tower or of the Palms as it used to be reserved as an entrance for the procession of the palms on Palm Sunday.

The façade was modified in 1787 by the architect Eugenio Durango under the orders of Cardinal Lorenzana. The sculptor was Mariano Salvatierra. The work was necessary because of the deterioration of the stone, which was not of good quality. It is possible that the portals were to be moved forward between buttresses instead of their current position, but this is not known for certain.

==== Portal of the Clock ====
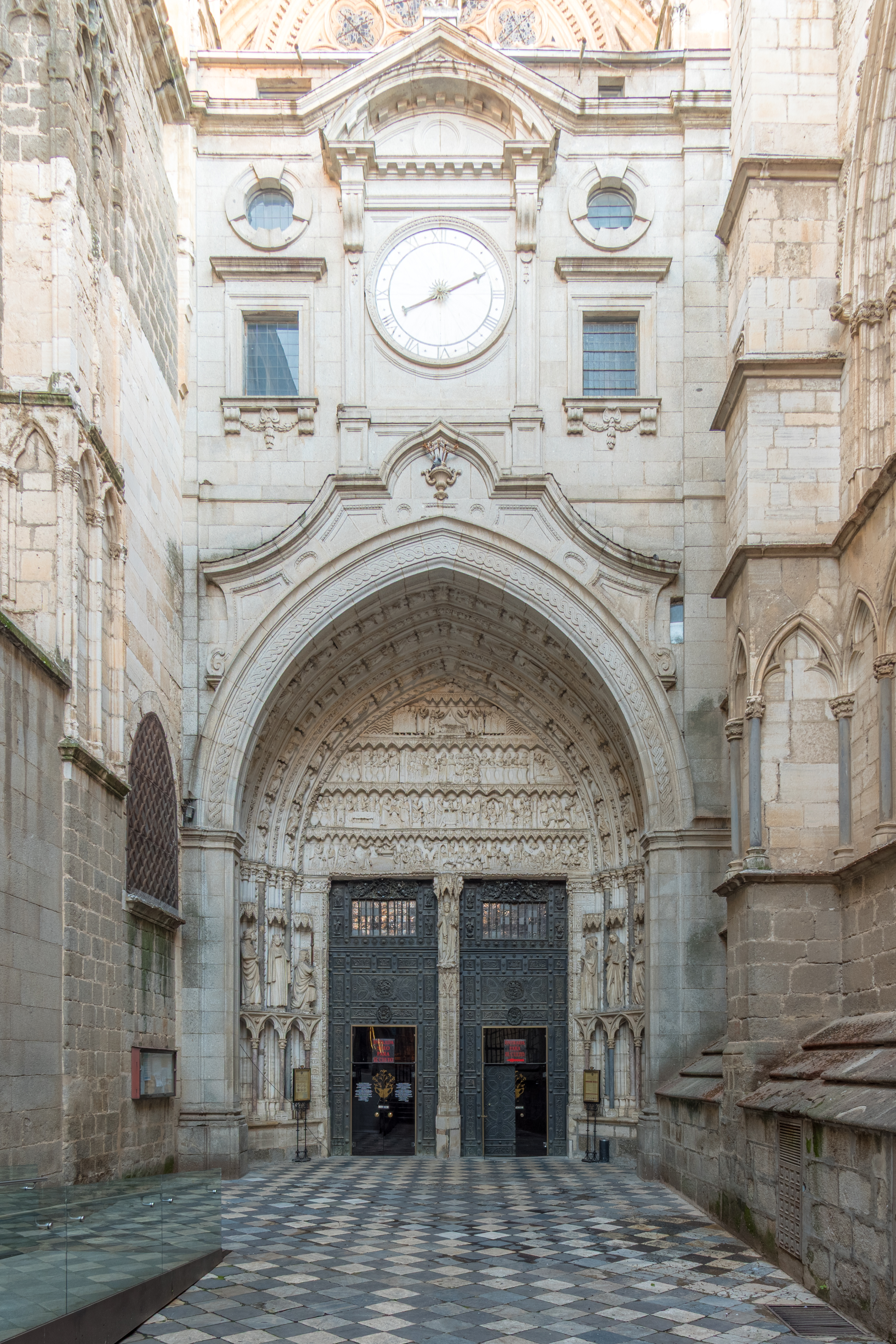
Puerta del reloj (Portal of the Clock)

The Portal of the Clock is the oldest of the portals, begun in the 14th century and located in the façade of the north side. In addition, it is also known as:

- Portal of the Fair, because it opened to the street where the fair was celebrated.
- Portal of the Chapinería (shoe-maker shop), because it fronts the street which bears that name, the place where clogs were made and sold.
- Portal of the Ollas, because in its decoration some ollas can be seen.
- Portal of the Monarchs, alluding to the iconography of its sculpture.
- Portal of the Lost Boy, also because of the iconography.

The tympanum is divided into four horizontal panels, in which there are scenes from the life of Christ: the Annunciation, the Nativity, the Adoration of the Magi, the Massacre of the Innocents, the Flight into Egypt, the Circumcision of Jesus, the Finding in the Temple, the Presentation of Jesus at the Temple, the Baptism and the Marriage at Cana. In the upper part of the tympanum, the Death of the Virgin is depicted. The column-mullion is decorated with an image of the Virgin and Child. In the jambs are images of kings and saints, all of which are the work of the sculptor Juan Alemán who also worked on the Portal of the Lions.

Above this portal is found the later sculpting of Gregorio López Durango, whose work is also seen on the main façade. It is consolidation work that was needed because of the deteriorated state of the stone. The central intercolumniation above the portal is occupied by the face of the clock that gives it its name. The portal and its surrounding stonework form an appealing space with the entranceway enclosed by a Gothic screen; this is the work of Juan Francés, with very plain crosspieces, a small, carved frieze with a separation in the center, and a simple and harmonious design.

Inside are diverse medallions; the best are those of the Virgin of the Annunciation by Nicolás de Vergara el Mozo and of the Archangel Saint Gabriel by Juan Bautista Vázquez. It is also adorned with paintings and coats of arms. Above is the rose window of the 13th century that contains the oldest stained glass of the cathedral.

==== Portal of the Lions ====
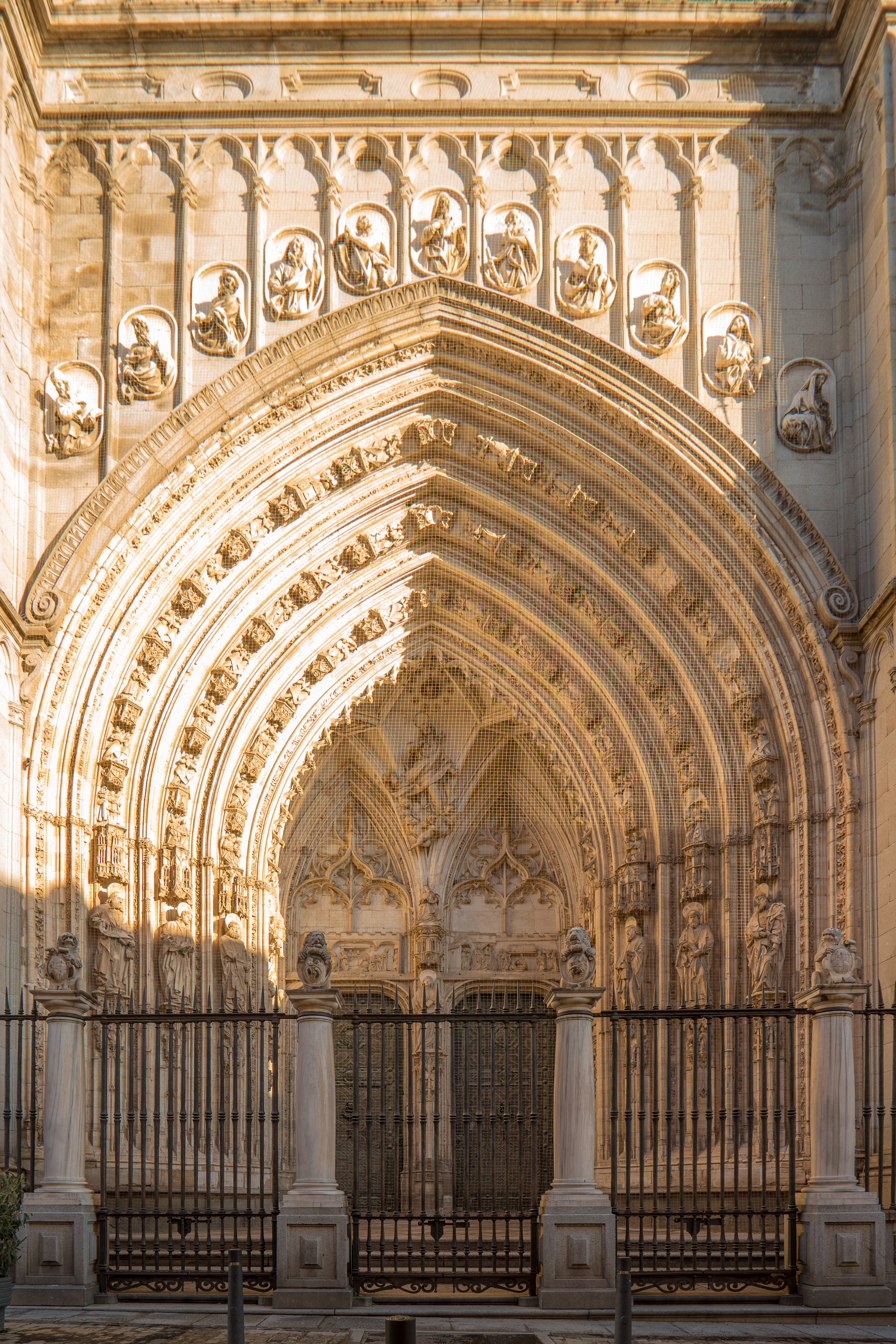
Puerta de los Leones (Portal of the Lions)

The Portal of the Lions was built in the 15th and 16th centuries. It is the most modern of the great portals. It is so named because of the lions that surmount the columns of the gate that encloses the small entranceway. In addition, it has two other names:

New Portal, for being the last that was built.
Portal of Joy, in allusion to the celebration of the Assumption of the Virgin that is represented in the face of the back wall, over the archivolts.

It was constructed between the years 1460 and 1466, under the mandate of Archbishop Alfonso Carrillo de Acuña, with designs from Hanequin of Brussels, also known as Anequín de Egas Cueman, and Enrique de Egas Cueman, his son, in collaboration with the Flemish sculptors Pedro and Juan Guas and Juan Alemán, designer of the Apostolate. These artists supervised a large workshop that included prestigious stonemasons and carvers.

The statuary of this portal is one of the best Hispano-Flemish assemblages of the 15th century, above all the Virgin of the column-mullion and the statues of the jambs. The cherubim and musical angels that accompany the ascension of Mary to the sky are works of art executed with great delicacy. The façade was altered by Durango and Salvatierra, the same as in the other portals, to enhance the appearance of the building. The bronze leaves of the doors are the work of Francisco de Villalpando, who created a masterpiece on the 35 panels or plates. They are hidden from view, protected with wood panels. On top is the great Rose Window of polychromatic stained glass.

The interior of the portal corresponds to the great façade of the transept on its southern side, on top of which rests the small balcony with balustrade that corresponds to the tribune where the organ of the Emperor is located. Higher up is the rose window, surrounded by a frame with its pendentives decorated with rosettes.

In the lower part of the great façade is the portal divided by a column-mullion. Above the doors are the tympanum sculpted with themes of the genealogy of the Virgin whose designers were the same who worked on the exterior of this portal. On top of the tympanum is the plateresque carving with a great medallion of the Coronation of the Virgin in the center, the work of Gregorio Pardo (eldest son of Felipe Vigarny). On both sides are the statues of David and Solomon, attributed to Esteban Jamete.

To the right and left of this front are two sepulchres. The one on the right is empty (it is believed that it was prepared to receive the remains of Brother Bartolomé Carranza); that of the left holds the remains of Canon Alfonso de Rojas, represented in a praying statue.

The bronze reja (metalwork screen) was made a century after the great screens of the main chapel and of the choir, in a style completely different from these, valuing solidity and utility more than the taste for ornamentation of the previous century. Its designer was Juan Álvarez de Molina, a native of Úbeda (Jaén), who made the screen in the city of Toledo in 1647. The documents preserved in regard to this say that the master metalsmith received 8,504 reales and 12 maravedís, in addition to the 27,000 reales that had been given to him earlier. The document gives account of the cost of the metal employed, which was nearly as much as the total payment he received for the work.

=== Other portals and façades of the cathedral ===
==== Level Portal ====
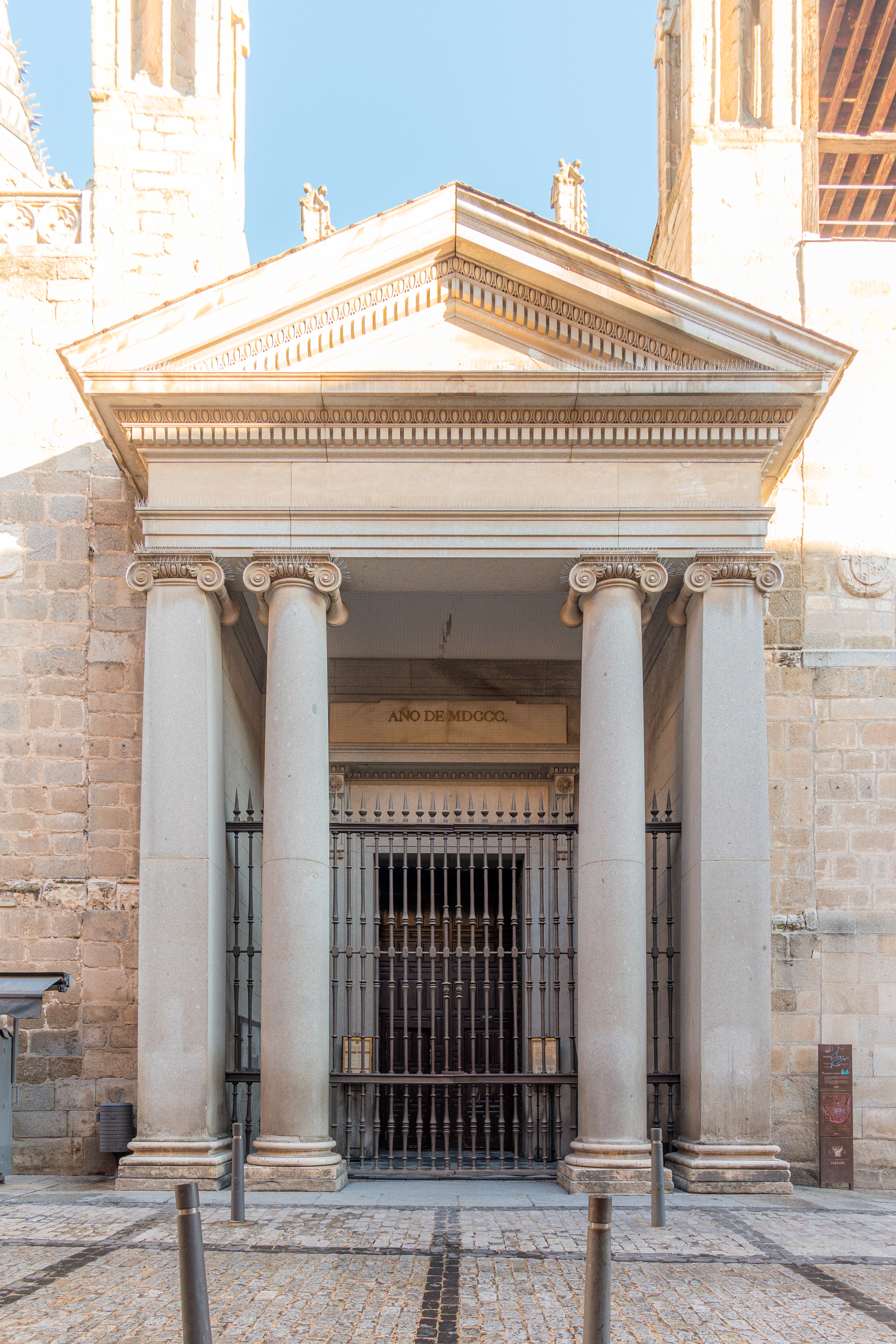
Puerta Llana

The Level Portal is of Neo-Classical style, built in 1800. It is the only entrance to the cathedral that is level with the ground, without steps, so giving it its name. It was customary for processions to exit through this portal.

==== Façade of Saint Katherine ====
The Façade of Saint Katherine is of late Gothic style. Its archivolts are carved with vegetal motifs of leaves and foliage. The pillar that makes the mullion is splendidly carved on its side faces, with castles and lions. In its interior, it has two sections. The higher section is ornamented with a series of statues with small dossals.

==== Portal of the Presentation ====
The Portal of the Presentation is from the time of Cardinal Tavera; it is richly carved with imagery of miniatures in very white stone.

=== Tower ===
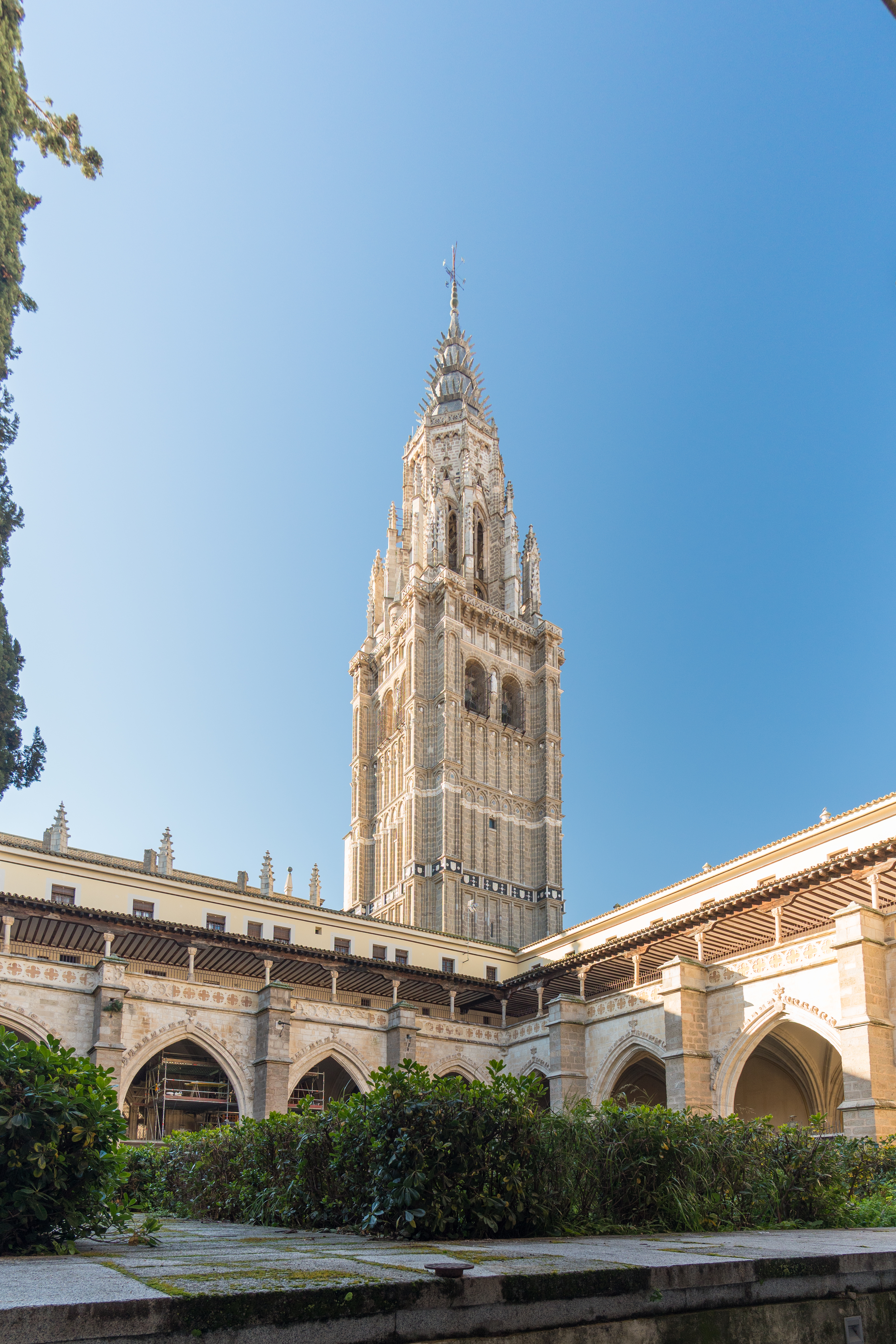
The tower as seen from the cloister

The original plan was to build two symmetric towers on each side of the west façade, but when the one at the northern corner was raised, it was discovered that the ground beneath the site planned for the southern tower was unstable due to an underground water stream. Even so, the Mozarabic chapel was later built there.

The tower was designed and built mostly by Alvar Martínez; it is Gothic, with some decorative Mudéjar influence and reaches a height of 92 m (301 ft). Four levels and a fifth of lesser height rise on a square elevated base which houses the chapel of the Treasury. Between the first and the second level a frieze of black marble unfolds horizontally, with the coat of arms of Archbishop Juan Martínez de Contreras (whose mandate was from 1422 until 1438) inlaid in white marble. Master Martínez completed this part of the work in 1422, but left no plans or drawings for construction of the pinnacle and its spire. This top level of the tower with its octagonal body was designed by the architect Hanequin de Bruselas, who was summoned to finish its construction with a group of accomplished masters: Egas Cueman, Enrique Egas and Juan Guas among others. The pinnacle with its buttressed arches rests on the octagonal barrel of the fifth level and is topped with a spire that supports three crowns imitating a papal tiara.

== Interior ==
=== High Altar ===
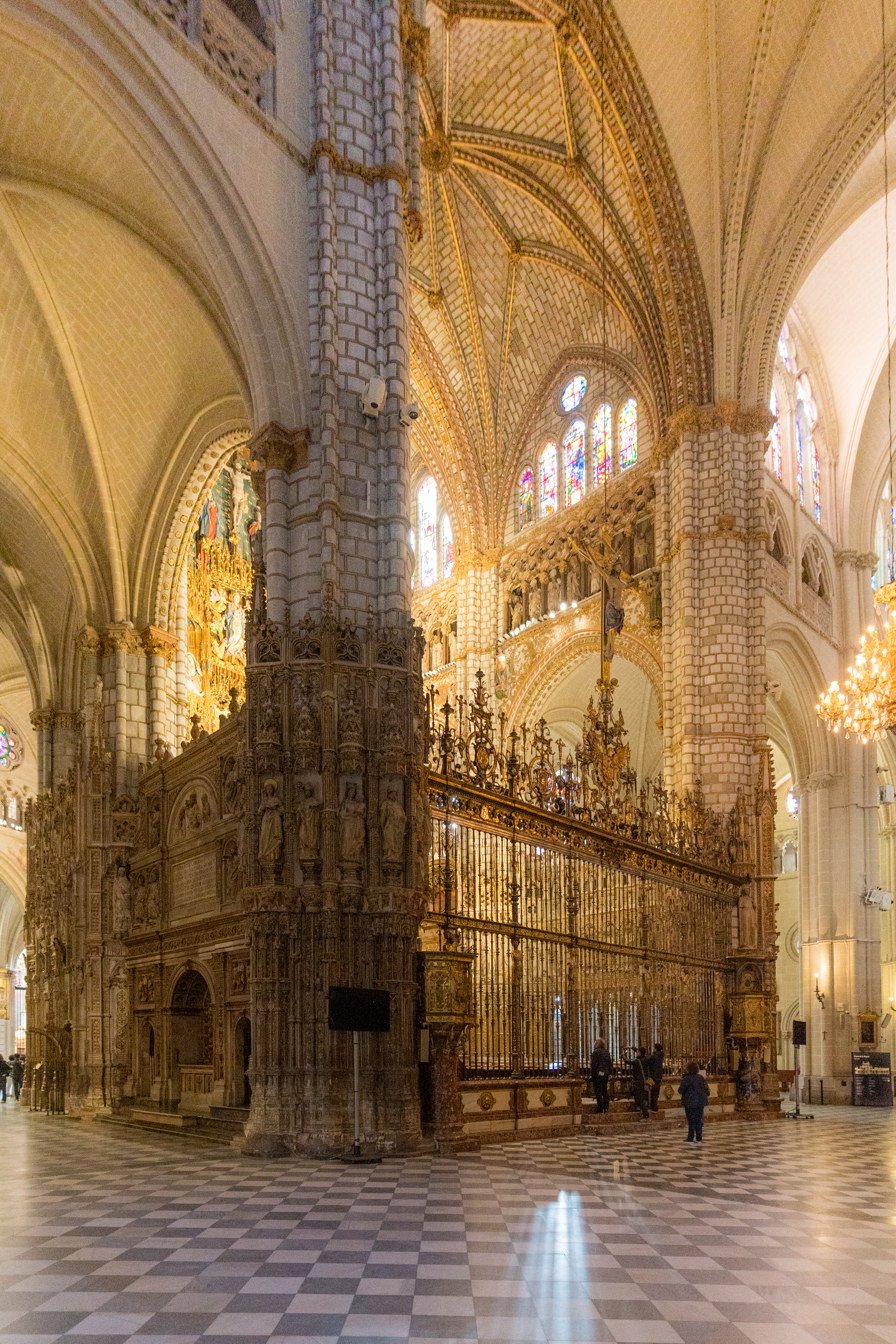
High Altar

The main chapel of the cathedral brings together a wealth of artwork, starting with the architecture of the enclosure itself. In its original state, the enclosure was separated into two parts with two independent vaults. The polygonal vault pertained to the chapel of the Old Monarchs, which was somewhat separated. With this arbitrary division, the presbytery was improperly narrow for such a grand cathedral. Cardinal Cisneros insisted that he wanted this part of the cathedral to be rebuilt and despite some resistance from the Chapel Chapter, he finally received its consent to demolish the old chapel and build one with a wider presbytery and sufficient space for the great Gothic retable which he himself had commissioned.

Also, in its original state, the chapel had been enclosed laterally by two magnificent screens of stone, which were like enormous gates. The Pulpit, or Gospel side of the church, with its screen, was demolished to make room for the sepulchre of Cardinal Mendoza. The lectern, or Epistle side, remains as it was and by this it can be deduced that it was part of a larger work. Some art critics assure us that this stone screen is the most beautiful part of the cathedral. It is possible that its construction was completed during the tenure of Archbishop Pedro de Luna whose polychromatic shield and coat of arms of Castile and León are displayed here. It is adorned with abundant statuary including a sculpted choir of angels that appear to be flying. The two pillars that form the passage to the interior of the chapel were built to harmonize with this work of fretted stone. On the left pillar is a statue of Martín Alhaja, the famous shepherd who (according to legend) led King Alfonso VIII of Castile through the Despeñaperros Pass in the Battle of Las Navas de Tolosa; the other pillar is called Faqih's Pillar after its statue of Abu Walid who brought King Alfonso VI a message of tolerance (see this section).

The whole sanctuary is covered with carved and chiselled mythological figures of all sizes. On the Pulpit side are the beautifully decorated sepulchres of Alfonso VII and Doña Berenguela with their recumbent statues, while on the Lectern side are the tombs of Sancho III of Castile (The Desired) and Sancho IV (The Brave). The images of the monarchs were carved in wood by Copín de Holanda and polychromed by Francisco de Amberes.

==== Chapel of the Sepulchre ====
Below the main altar is the Chapel of the Sepulchre in the form of a crypt. It is entered from outside the presbytery, through a screen and the Portal, and down a staircase. It is a vaulted chapel which contains three altars. The center altar is dedicated to the Holy Sepulchre and has a sculptural grouping carved by Copín de Holanda. The altar on the right has important paintings by Luis Medina and Francisco Ricci. The altar on the left is dedicated to Saint Julian and presents a carving of the archbishop and two Italian panels with the theme of Saint Peter and Saint Paul.

==== Altarpiece ====
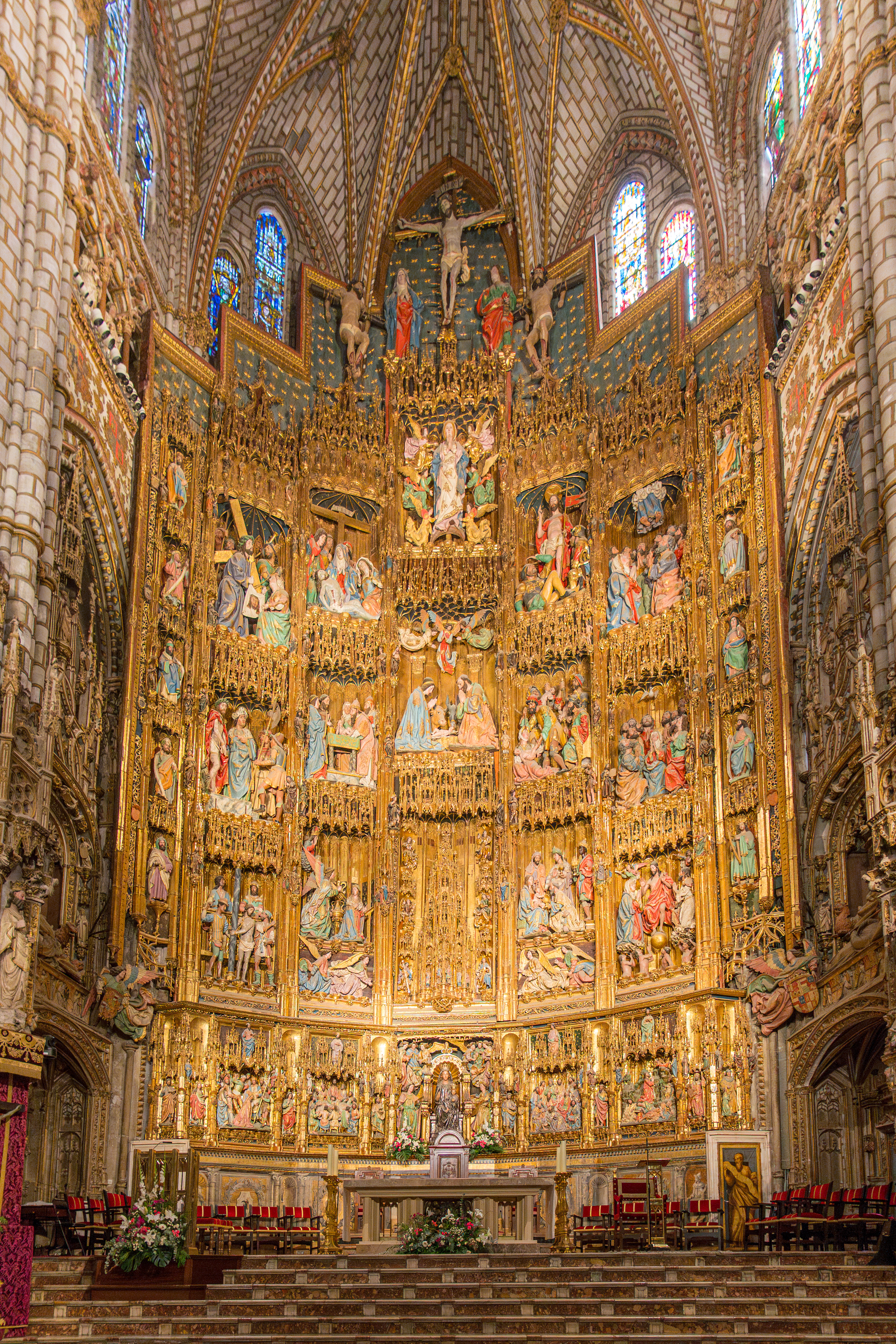
Altarpiece, completed in 1504

The altarpiece is an extremely florid Gothic retable; it is one of the last examples of this artistic style, which was disappearing as the Renaissance began to take hold in Spain. Commissioned by Cardinal Cisneros, the work was begun in 1497 and finished in 1504. Among the architects, painters and sculptors who collaborated in this collective masterwork were: Enrique Egas and Pedro Gumiel (design), Francisco de Amberes and Juan de Borgoña (estofado: the technique of finishing sculpture of wood with gilding and punched patterns, and polychromy), Rodrigo Alemán, Felipe Vigarny, Diego Copín de Holanda y Sebastián de Almonacid (religious images), and Joan Peti (carving and filigree).

The altarpiece rises to a great height above the altar; it includes statuary and a filigree of balusters, spires, small dossals, and chambranles, all done by Joan Peti. It consists of five continuous panels, the center panel being the widest; it is five storeys tall, and the lines of separation are stair-stepped. The themes of the central panel from bottom to top are: the figure of a seated Virgin and Child plated in silver on the predella, above this the tabernacle and a Gothic monstrance carved in wood, then a depiction of the Nativity, and above that, the Ascension. The whole culminates in a monumental scene of Christ's crucifixion at Calvary. Further themes of the life and passion of Jesus are represented on the other panels.

==== Sepulchre of Cardinal Mendoza ====
The sepulchre of Cardinal Mendoza was located in the cathedral as he himself had decreed in 1493; the Chapel Chapter had been opposed from the beginning to its being situated in the Presbytery, this space was reserved as the privileged prerogative of the monarchs. Nevertheless, in the end the structure of the choir had to be altered and the royal tombs moved to accommodate the sepulchre. In its final decision the Chapter deferred to the personal intervention in favor of the Cardinal by the Catholic Monarchs, who cited the invaluable services performed by those whom Isabel the Catholic called 'the three beautiful sins of the cardinal' (his children). When he died, on 11 January 1495 in Guadalajara, it was said those present had seen a sparkling white cross, perhaps in an effort to invest his posthumous reputation with an aura of sanctity.

The sepulchre of Cardinal Mendoza was the first Castilian Renaissance sepulchre. The structure consists of an open central arch and two smaller arches, carved on two façades and through which the tomb can be seen from inside and outside, following the model of a Roman triumphal arch, which was shocking to those who assisted in its construction, as much for its spectacular form as for abandoning the Gothic style, which until that moment was the established convention. The authorship of the work is not clear, though it is attributed to the Florentine Jacopo d'Antonio Sansovino who later worked in the Portuguese court with a similar style.

The impact on other later works was enormous: the sepulchres of Fadrique of Portugal, Pedro López de Ayala or Fernando de Arce, among others, were partial imitations of this new model.

=== The interior chapels: overview ===
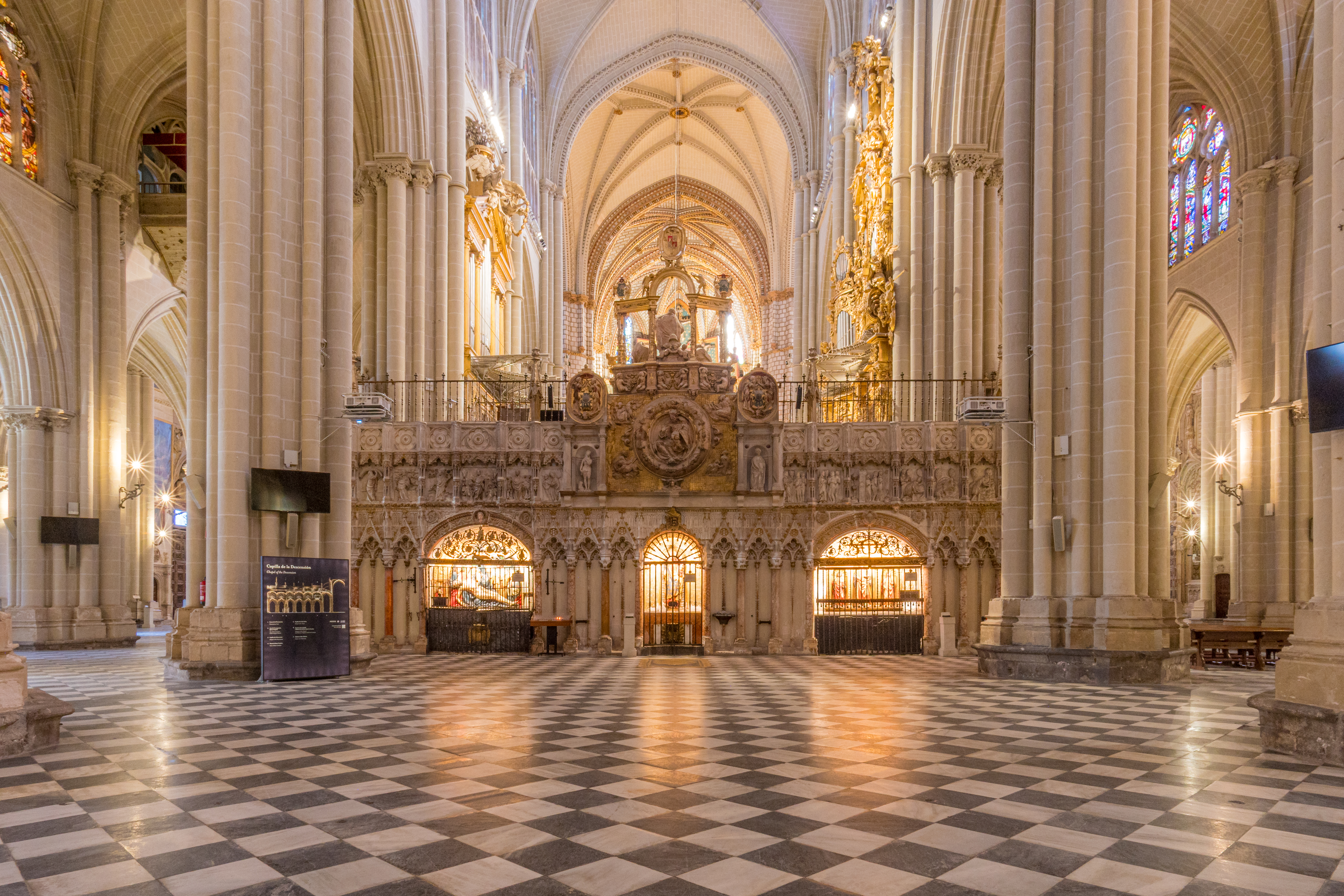
Retrochoir and interior overview

The main and minor chapels, conceived in the project of Rodrigo Ximénez de Rada, in their original state surrounded the sanctuary of the cathedral. Some were removed and others were widened or re-ordered. Of the minor chapels only the chapels of Saint Ann and Saint Giles remain. Of the main chapels those of Saint John the Baptist and Saint Leocadia remain with elements from the first era. The chapels of the Old Monarchs and of Saint Lucy remain with alterations only to their ornamentation.

The rest were drastically modified or removed, even though in some the entrance can still be recognized: six small chapels of the ambulatory gave way in the 14th and 15th centuries to the burial chapels of Saint Ildephonsus and Saint James; that of the Christ of the Column (also called of Saint Bartholomew) was transformed at the beginning of the 17th century to give way to that of the Christ of the Students; those of Saint Barbara, of Saint Nicholas, of Saint Elizabeth and of the Holy Trinity were integrated into other structures although some details permit their earlier appearance to be discerned.

After the various modifications, there now can be found the aforementioned Chapels of the Old Monarchs, Saint John the Baptist, Saint Leocadia and Saint Lucy, including that of Saint Eugene, of Saint Blaise (incorporated into the cloister), of Saint Peter and of the New Monarchs.

In the subsequent remodeling and construction, the architects almost always followed the criterion of advancing from the sanctuary of the cathedral towards the wall, which explains the sometimes chaotic current layout, with respect to the early designs. The first name of the chapel of the Old Monarchs is unknown. The current name had its origin in 1498 when Cardinal Cisneros wanted to transfer the royal tombs from the main chapel, which in the end was never done. In the 13th century, this served as a sepulchre to house the remains of Archbishop González Díaz Palomeque. The chapel of Saint Lucy is one of the few places in the cathedral where some remains of the old mosque can still be seen—in particular, a column and its capital.

The chapel of Saint Eugene (also called of Saint Peter the Old or of the Corpus Christi), is located on the south side, and retains the architectural style of the 13th century in contrast to the rest of the cathedral. The chapel of Saint Peter is the largest of all and serves as a parochial chapel. The cathedral has a heptagonal sanctuary, with two rows, and tierceron vaults; it was built at the beginning of the 15th century to serve as a burial chamber for Archbishop Sancho de Rojas.

==== Mozarabic chapel ====
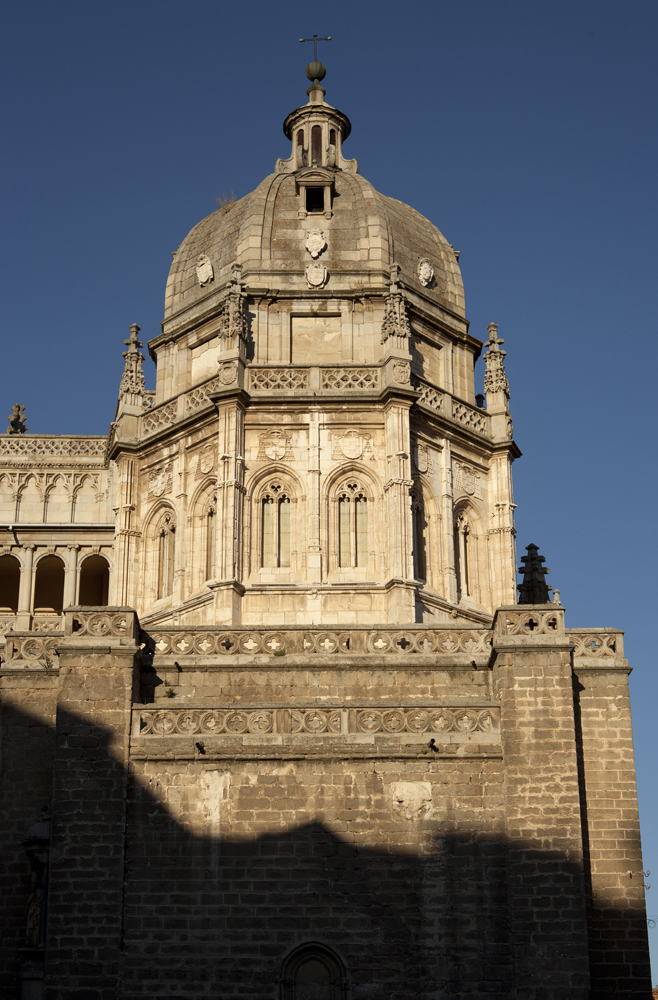
Mozarabic chapel exterior

It is located at the southeast corner, and incorporates the foundations of an unbuilt second tower. The chapel was named originally the Chapel of the Corpus Christi in 1500 by Cardinal Cisneros. Its purpose was to provide a worship place for followers of the Hispano-Mozarabic rites. Centuries earlier, on 20 March 1101, King Alfonso VI had given certain privileges to the Mozarabes of Toledo in exchange for tribute. In 1371, King Henry II confirmed these privileges. Having founded this chapel, Cisneros encouraged the restoration and republishing of the codices, breviaries and missals of their rites; he seems to have aimed to conciliate that subset of the faithful. This supposition is reinforced by notice of the large sum he had to pay the Cathedral Chapter in order to do the work of joining the old chapter house and the minor chapels. The huge sum of 3800 gold florins was raised, suggesting there were sufficient local patrons in town to support the effort. Services in the Mozarabic Rite are still performed in this chapel.

The chapel design encompasses a square floor plan under an octagonal dome. A coffered ceiling of Mozarabic style has been lost (perhaps in the fire in 1620, or by later remodeling). The current dome was designed in the 17th century by the son of El Greco, Jorge Manuel Theotocópuli; it displays eight sections and a large roof lantern cupola. In the interior, Cardinal Cisneros commissioned Juan de Borgoña to depict highlights of the conquest of Oran.

The Gothic ironwork screen was fashioned by Juan Francés (1524), and incorporates among its ornamental elements the coat of arms of Cardinal Cisneros. The mosaic crucifix dates to the 18th century. It is said that it was brought from Rome and that the ship was shipwrecked in transit, leaving the image for a time at the bottom of the sea until it was recovered. The crucifix proper is made of a single piece, carved in Mexican fennel root. Another Gothic rood screen, the work of the Toledan Julio Pascual, separates the choir from the rest of the chapel.

==== Chapel of the New Monarchs ====
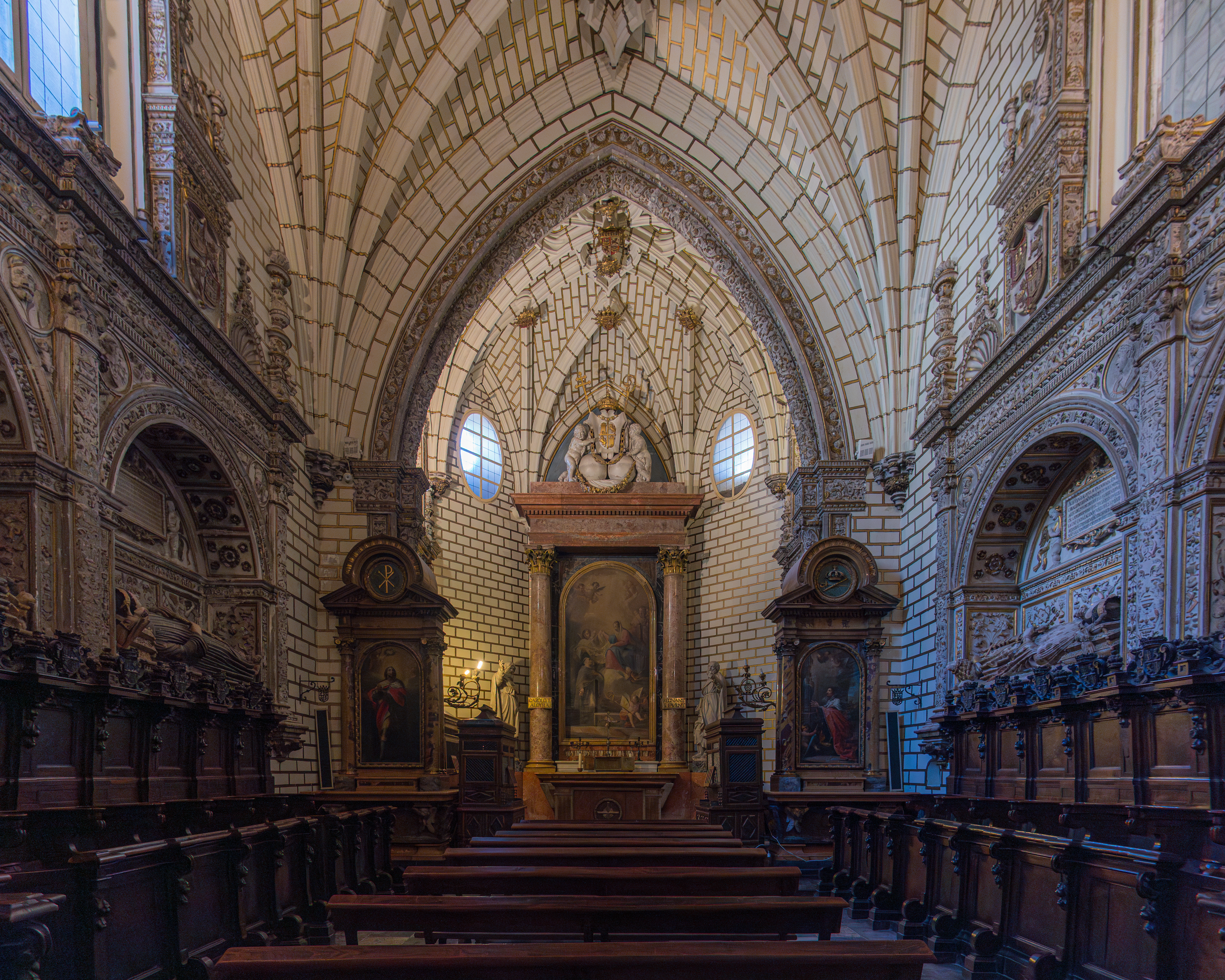
Chapel of the New Monarchs

The name references the new lineage of the Trastámara. The current chapel is located on the north side of the chapels of Saint James and of Leocadia, in the sanctuary, on the north side. It has an odd and difficult entrance designed by the architect Alonso de Covarrubias. Before being moved to this space, it was called the Royal Chapel and was located at the foot of the cathedral, on the side nave of the north side (the Gospel Pulpit side), encompassing the last section, which cut off and impeded passage to the end of the nave. The Chapel Chapter wanted to change the location of this chapel to clear the nave, and Archbishop Alonso de Fonseca y Acevedo asked for permission to change its position in his correspondence with the King. The difficulty was finding a suitable site, which was finally resolved through the efforts of its architect, Alonso de Covarrubias.

More than a chapel, it can be considered as a small church, of one nave with two sections and a polygonal apse, including a sacristy and an entrance vestibule, the original design of Covarrubias. It was built between 1531 and 1534. It is the first great work done by Covarrubias in Toledo.

The two sections of the nave have Gothic Cross vaults but all of the ornamentation and carving of the sepulchres is in Renaissance style. They are separated by a screen, the work of Domingo de Céspedes. The first section forms the body of the small church with some altars and in the second section is where the relocated royal sepulchres were placed in Renaissance vaulted tombs, the work of Covarrubias. On one side are Henry II and his wife Juana Manuel; in front of them, lying in sarcophagi, are Henry III the Infirm and Catherine of Lancaster.

Through the arch that gives access to the presbytery are two small altars in neoclassical style. The main altar is by Mateo Medina. It has a painting by Maella with the theme of the Descension, framed by two Corinthian columns. On both sides of this altar are tombs with the respective praying statues of John I of Castile and his wife Eleanor of Aragon.

As a historical memorial, the armor of the second lieutenant Duarte de Almeida, who fought in the Battle de Toro (where he lost both arms, and was taken prisoner by the troops of the Catholic Monarchs in 1476), is kept in this chapel.

=== Chapels of the south wall ===
Chapel of the Epiphany: is a continuation of the Mozarabic chapel. The painting of the altarpiece, attributed to Juan de Borgoña (died c. 1438), on the theme of the Adoration of the Magi, inspired the name of this chapel. It was endowed in 1397 by Pedro Fernández de Burgos and his wife Maria Fernandez, who are buried on the Epistle side of the wall. It was later restored by Luis Daza (died 1504) who was chaplain to Henry IV. It has a well-executed screen enclosing it, in the style of the rejero (screen-maker) Juan Francés. A portrait of the chaplain is seen in the figure of the donor in the predella of the altarpiece. On one side of this chapel is his sepulchre, in a Gothic arcosolium. The frescos in the Chapter Room, also by Juan de Borgona, representing the life of the Virgin, Christ's Passion, and the Last Judgment set within a trompe l'oeil gallery of columns, have long been understood to be the first introduction of a Renaissance painting style to Castile.

Chapel of the Conception: is accessed through a screen of much artistic value which incorporates the coat of arms of the Salcedo family, as construction of the chapel was financed in 1502 by Juan de Salcedo, apostolic protonotary and Toledan canon. On its altarpiece are paintings by Francisco de Amberes and to the left side is the sepulchre of its patron.

Chapel of Saint Martin: is also enclosed by a large screen, signed by Juan Francés with the following signature: "Juan Francés, grandmaster reja-maker".

The chapel has a well-regarded altarpiece, believed to have been worked on by the masters Juan de Borgoña and Francisco de Amberes. It is divided into three panels and five vertical sections. The central panel represents the namesake of the chapel, Saint Martin of Tours; it is believed to be the work of Andrés Florentino. On the sides of the altar are arcosolia containing the sepulchres of the canons Tomás González de Villanueva and Juan López de León; their sarcophagi are covered by their recumbent statues.

Chapel of Saint Eugene: is unique in retaining the original architecture from the 13th century. Previously called the Chapel of Saint Peter, its name was changed during the time of the Archbishop Sancho de Rojas. It is enclosed by a screen very similar to the others signed by Juan Francés. On the altarpiece is the image of its namesake saint, the archbishop of Toledo, by Copín de Holanda. This chapel contains a work distinguished by its early date and its art, i.e., the sepulchre of the Bailiff of Toledo called Fernán Gudiel, who died in 1278. It is in Mudéjar style, with neither architecture nor sculpture, decorated simply with plasterwork in which geometric themes predominate. The arcosolium is delimited by two double columns that protrude from the upper frieze or cornice, which is adorned with decorative corbels called muqarnas. Lining this cornice is a repetitive inscription in the Arabic language which says: "The Mother of God. To the Virgin Mary".

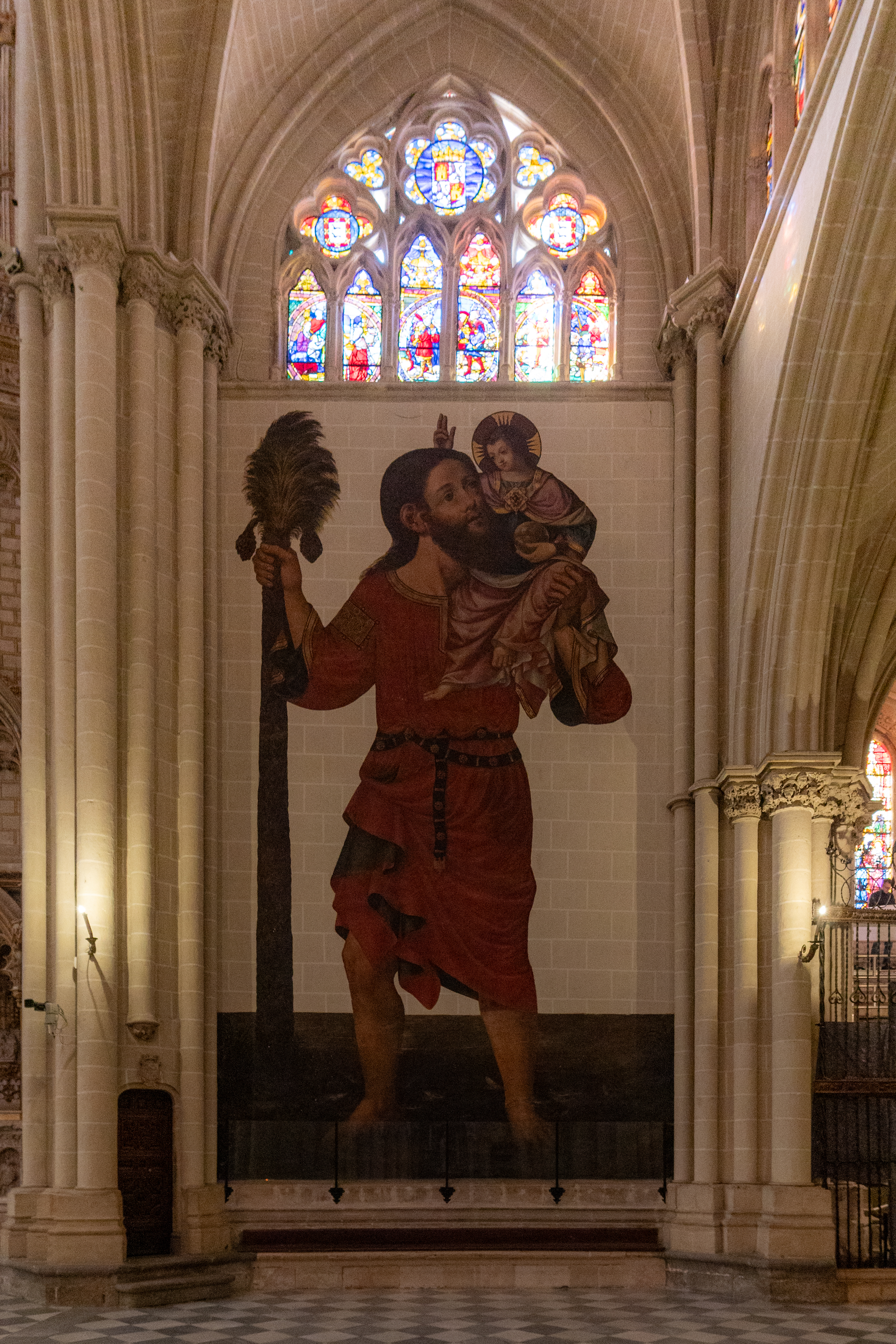
Saint Christopher carrying the Christ Child

The other tomb is the burial place of the canon and bishop Ferdinand of Castillo, who died in 1521, the work wholly done by Alonso de Covarrubias. On the wall of the aisle between the chapel and the Portal of the Lions is the monumental painting of Saint Christopher (San Cristobalón) carrying the Christ child, painted in an earlier period and restored in 1638 by the painter Gabriel de Rueda.

=== Chapels of the ambulatory ===
The original chapels were small and were designed to alternate in size, according to how the vaults were aligned. With time, reforms were made that completely changed the placement and size of some of these.

==== The original chapels ====
Chapel of Saint Lucy (Patron saint of the blind): also called Chapel of Saint Joseph. Its original architecture from the 13th century is preserved; it contains some paintings and epitaphs.

Chapel of the Old Monarchs: the previous chapel with this name, founded by Sancho IV, was located in the high part of the presbytery, where the sepulchres of the monarchs are paid respect. Cardinal Cisneros had it dismantled and ordered it relocated to the place it now occupies. It is enclosed with a well-worked screen by Domingo de Céspedes. The chapel contains three interesting retables: the center retable has eleven good Hispano-Flemish panels and a relic of the Holy Face of Jesus, a present from Pope Innocent X, which King Philip IV commanded to be placed here.

Chapel of Saint Ann: has a fine Plateresque screen and contains the tomb of its sponsor, Juan de Mariana. It is one of the smallest chapels.

Chapel of Saint John the Baptist: is enclosed with a Gothic screen. Its sponsor was the archdeacon of Niebla and canon of Toledo, Fernando Díaz de Toledo, whose tomb suffered damage in 1790, sparing only the recumbent figure which was placed on one side of the chapel. A relic with a valuable ivory statue of Christ is also preserved in a shrine within this space. The chapel has a sacristy, corresponding to what had been the chapel of Saint Britus or Saint Bricius.

Chapel of Saint Giles: is considered a jewel amongst the chapels, although it is very small. Its sponsor was Miguel Díaz, canon and apostolic notary, a man of refined artistic taste who commissioned the entire interior to be painted with decoration in Pompeiian style, a style which at the time was fashionable in the Escorial. The screenwork was also executed in good taste. The chapel has a small altar of various marblework.

==== The Chapterhouse (Sala Capitular) ====
Beyond the chapels of the ambulatory stands the Chapterhouse. First one passes through a fine portal by Diego Copin (1510) to the Antesala, an old chapel of small size which serves as a kind of vestibule through which the Chapterhouse is entered; it has a marble floor, an artesonado (a coffered wooden ceiling with lacery of interlaced laths), by Francisco de Lara (1517), and a plateresque frieze by Juan de Borgoña. The Antesala is furnished with wardrobes or cabinets; the finer work on the left with Hellenistic decoration is by Gregorio Pardo (1551), and that on the right is by Gregorio López Durango (1780). The square portal leading from here to the Chapterhouse proper was executed in the so-called Cisneros style by Master Pablo and Bernardino Bonifacio de Tovar, combining Mudéjar features with Plateresque decoration, in 1510.

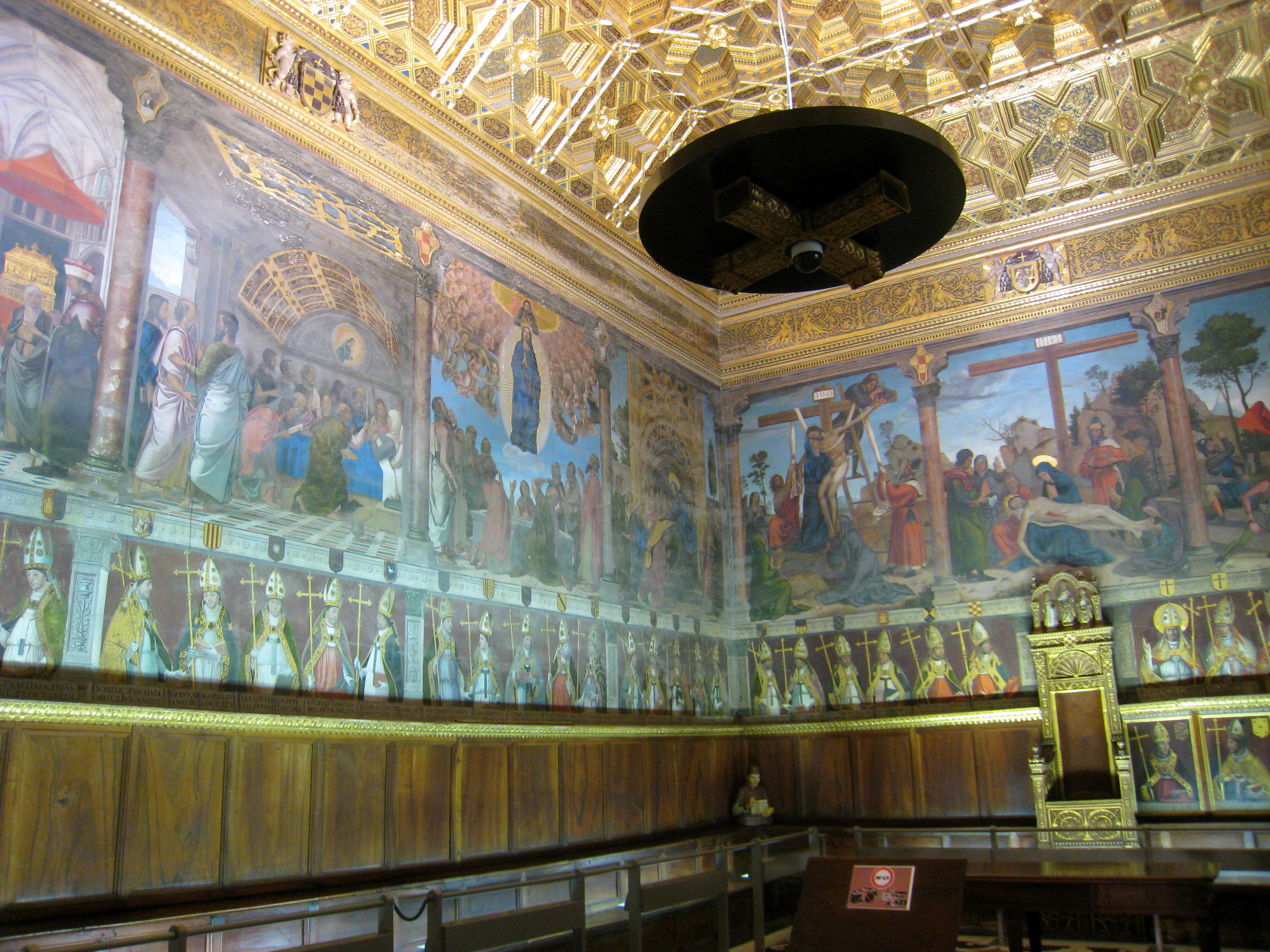
Chapterhouse of the Cathedral of Toledo

The Chapterhouse was commissioned by Cardinal Cisneros to be built abutting the apse on its south side, in 1504. The drawing of the plans was assigned to the architect Enrique Egas. It is a rectangular unvaulted room, with a beautiful artesonado coffered ceiling done by Diego López de Arenas and Francisco de Lara between 1508 and 1510 in the Cisneros style. It is painted red, blue and gold; the frieze (alicer) has a very rich plateresque ornamentation. The painting and frieze were the work of Luis de Medina and Alfonso Sanchez (1510). The entire room is traversed by a wood pew which functions as the seat of honour for the prelates, save the archbishopric chair at the end of the room, centre of the wall, carved by Copín de Holanda and finished in 1514. Above the seats of honor, in two rows and lining the walls are the portraits of all the archbishops from Saint Eugene to the last. Juan de Borgoña painted the series of portraits from Saint Eugene to Cardinal Cisneros. Those of Sandoval and Rojas were done by Tristán; of Moscoso, by Ricci; of Iguanzo, by Vicente López.

Between the gallery of portraits and the frieze of the coffering, the walls are adorned with a celebrated series of frescoes by Juan de Borgoña. This constitutes one of the great collections of Spanish wall paintings. Trompe l'oeil columns divide the panels where scenes of the life of the Virgin and of the Passion of Christ are depicted.

Chapel of Saint Ildephonsus: is situated in the centre of the ambulatory and faces El Transparente, a Baroque altarpiece created in 1729-1732 by Narciso Tomé and his four sons. The chapel is consecrated under the protection of Saint Ildephonsus; its construction dates from the end of the 14th century by the expressed desire of Cardinal Gil Carrillo of Albornoz as a burial chapel for himself and his family, which he did not see completed. Cardinal Albornoz died in Viterbo, Italy, in 1367; his remains were later transferred to Toledo where Henry of Castile had them entombed with almost royal honours.

The chapel occupies the space of three earlier chapels: one large central chapel and two smaller side chapels. It is of octagonal plan, being one of the first chapels in which the model of an octagon was used for a burial chapel.

On the keystone of the central arch of the entranceway is a portrait painting of Esteban Illán, who proclaimed Alfonso VIII as king of Castile, doing so from the height of the tower of Saint Roman. The chapel is built in three styles of different periods: Gothic in the arches, vaults and a sepulchre; Plateresque in the sepulchre of the bishop of Ávila; and Neo-Classical in the central altar. This 18th-century altar was made of marble, jasper and bronze, and was designed by Ventura Rodríguez; the large relief in its centre, with its theme of the gift of the chasuble to Saint Ildephonsus, is the work of Manuel Francisco Álvarez (1783), completed during the time of Cardinal Lorenzana.

The Sepulchres of the Chapel of Saint Ildephonsus
The sepulchre of Cardinal Gil Carrillo de Albornoz is in the center of the chapel, with Gothic decoration of small arches and lamenting figures on its four faces. To the right of the altar is the sepulchre of the bishop of Ávila, Alonso Carrillo of Albornoz, who died in 1514. This, the work of Vasco de la Zarza, Castilian Renaissance sculptor, is considered the best work of the chapel. The remaining sepulchres are other tombs of the Albornoz family.

=== Chapel of Saint James ===
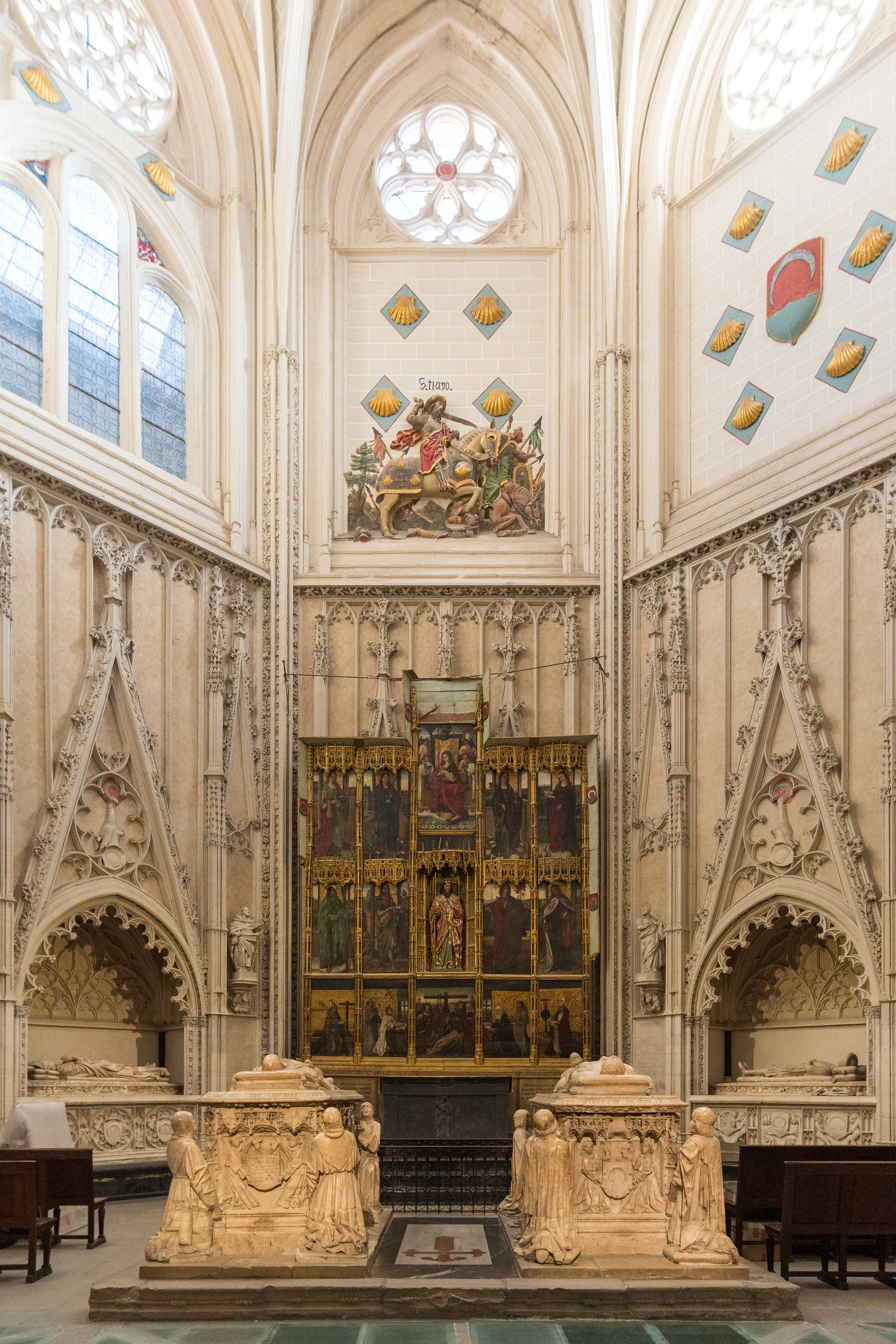
Saint James Chapel and sepulchres

Also called the Chapel of Álvaro de Luna for the historical figure who commissioned the chapel as a burial place for himself and his family. This is one of the largest of the ambulatory, occupying the space of three of the old chapels: one large chapel and two small chapels; its floor plan is laid out in octagonal shape. The Chapel of Saint James is of a very pure and select Flamboyant style, one of the best examples that exist in Spain. This most elaborate Gothic style is reflected in the entrance arches with their openwork traceries and in the skylight of the blind arches of the interior, in the gables, the ornaments (openwork and hanging festoon), and the structural ribs rising from the floor that cross the vault forming a star. Nevertheless, the exterior features are austere, and completely Hispanic. Granite was used for the cladding, in contrast with the pleasing whiteness of the stone of the interior; the dome is crested in the manner of a battlemented castle with turrets.

==== History ====
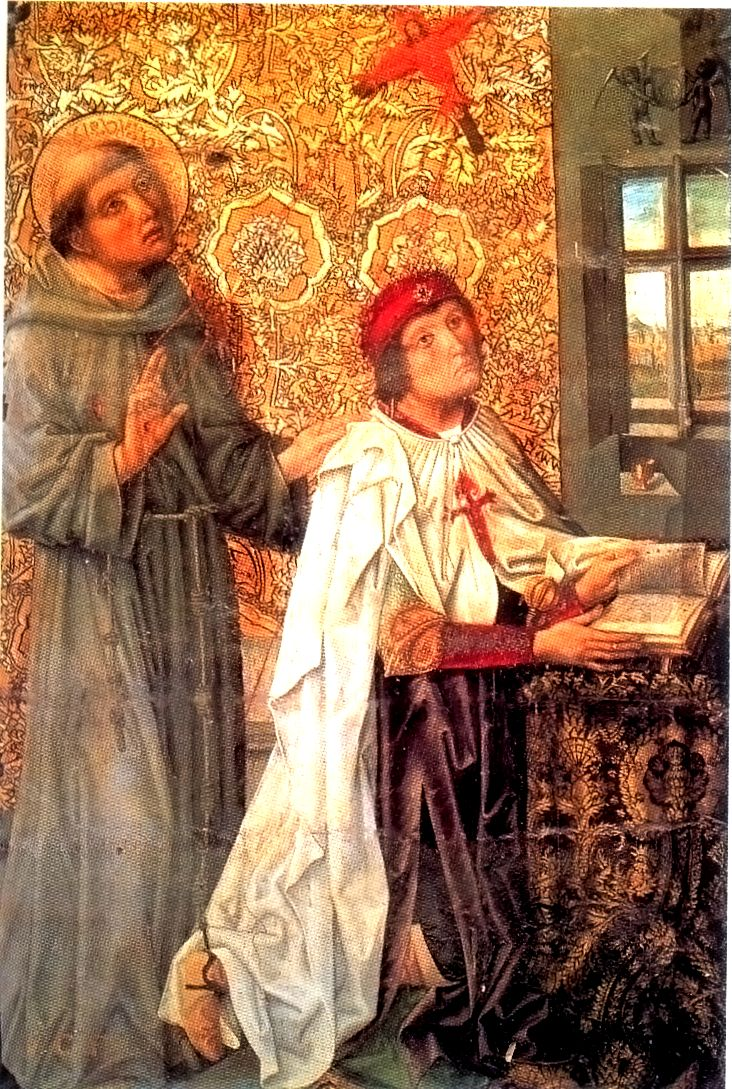
Álvaro de Luna y Jarana wearing the cope (cloak) of the Order of Santiago, and its cross on his chest. Grand Master of the order from 1445 to 1453, he prays before the altarpiece of the chapel of St. James in the cathedral of Toledo.

In 1435, High Constable of Castile Álvaro de Luna had reached the height of his political power. He wanted his own chapel in the primatial cathedral as a sepulchre for himself and his family, so he bought the earlier chapel of Saint Thomas of Canterbury which had been commissioned in the 12th century by Queen Eleanor Plantagenet, this being the first chapel dedicated to the saint outside England. It is known that Álvaro commissioned the sepulchre while he was still alive; a three-dimensional figure of his person was made that consisted in a somewhat strange device—the bronze figure raised up and knelt down by means of a special mechanism activated at the moment the mass started. When he was executed under orders of King John II, the chapel was still under construction so its completion was placed in care of his wife, Juana de Pimentel, and later of his daughter, María de Luna, who commissioned the sculpting of her parents' sarcophagi in 1498. This was the probable year of the chapel's completion by the great company of masters who were the associates of Hanequin de Bruselas.

==== Retable ====
The retable is a Gothic altarpiece, the work of Pedro de Gumiel with fourteen panels painted by Sancho de Zamora. He was contracted by María de Luna in 1488. In the center is an equestrian figure of Saint James, the work of Juan de Segovia. In the center of the predella is represented the scene of the Weeping Before a Dead Christ, and on its sides the Count Álvaro and his wife are portrayed as patrons accompanied by Saint Francis and Saint Anthony.

==== Burials ====
The two sepulchres in the center of the chapel belong to Álvaro and his wife Juana de Pimentel. The reclining figures are Hispano-Flemish sculptures by Pablo Ortiz. The praying figures in the corners are of high quality: a Knight of Santiago kneels at each corner of Álvaro's tomb, in the corners of his wife's tomb are four Franciscan friars.

In recesses in the left wall are the tombs of Juan de Luna (the son of Álvaro), Álvaro de Luna (father), the archbishop Juan de Cerezuela (half-brother) and Archbishop Pedro de Luna (uncle). The Dukes Infante have their own burial crypt beneath the chapel.

Chapel of Saint Leocadia: has a lattice of stone worked in Flamboyant style. It served as a burial chapel for the canon Juan Ruiz Ribera who commissioned its restoration in 1536; his ashes are in an urn located inside a niche. His uncle Juan Ruiz the Elder is buried in the front wall . In the retable may be found the namesake image of Saint Leocadia, a painting of the 18th century by Ramón Seyro (student of Mariano Salvador Maella), framed in white and black marblework.

Chapel of the Christ of the Column: is a very small space. The most significant feature is the altar attributed to Diego Copín de Holanda, with well-done carvings of Christ on the column between Saint Peter and Saint John, in an attitude of prayer.

=== Chapels of the north wall ===
Chapel of Saint Peter: is situated between the Portal of the Clock and the Chapel of Saint Catherine (which leads to the cloister). Its patron was Sancho de Rojas who is buried here; more than a chapel, it sometimes serves as a parish church. The entrance, delimited by an iron screen, is through a Gothic portal decorated by archivolts with vegetal and heraldic themes in which are replicated the five-star motif found on the coat of arms of the Rojas. The interior wall has fresco paintings attributed to Pedro Berruguete or to Íñigo Comontes. A bust image of the archbishop decorates the vertex of the last archivolt, and to the right and left are small busts of the fourteen ranking bishops of the Chapter. In the centre and over the statuette of the archbishop is another Gothic image of Saint Peter on his throne.

Chapel of Mercy: founded by the canon treasurer Alfonso Martínez for his burial. The altar is dedicated to Saint Teresa whose image is attributed to Pedro de Mena or to his studio.

Chapel of the Baptismal Font: The most notable feature is the ironwork screen by Domingo of Céspedes. The bronze baptismal font is highly decorated with Gothic-Renaissance elements.

Chapel of Our Lady of La Antigua: has a decorated ironwork screen. It is consecrated to the Virgen de la Antigua, an icon which tradition claims predates the Muslim conquest of Toledo.

Chapel of Doña Teresa de Haro: also known as of the Christ of the Spoons in reference to the ladles on the coat of arms of the López de Padilla family. It was founded by Teresa de Haro, widow of Marshal Diego López de Padilla.

=== Composite unity of the Herrerian spaces ===
This section pertains to the comprehensive architectural composition of the spaces of the Sacristy (including the vestuary and other rooms), the courtyard and house of the Treasurer, the Chapel of the Tabernacle and Chapel of the Eighths or of the Reliquary, situated at the north side of the cathedral.

==== Sacristy ====
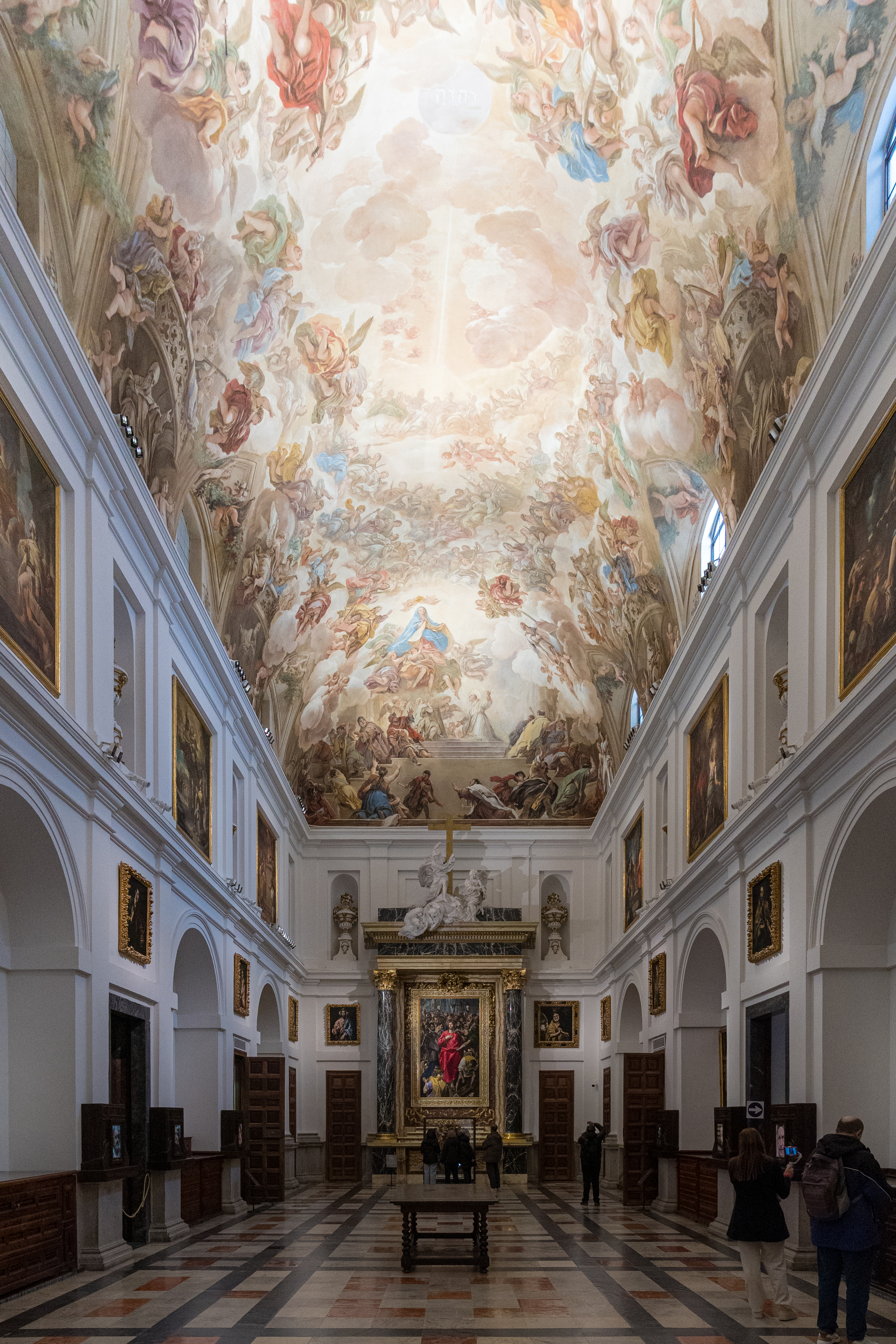
Sacristy

The sacristy exhibits treasures from the cathedral's collection, including many major works of art. It is a large space that includes the apartments of the ante-sacristy and the vestuary with its collection of garments. The ante-sacristy is a rectangular room decorated with paintings by the Italian artists Vincenzo Carducci and Eugenio Caxés, as well as Francisco Ricci and the Neapolitan Luca Giordano.

The sacristy was designed by Francisco Vergara the Greater and Juan Bautista Monegro, in Herrerian style. The barrel vault, inset with lunettes accommodating the windows, is lavishly decorated with frescos by Luca Giordano. The principal theme is the Clothing of Saint Ildephonsus with the Chasuble, a theme that is repeated throughout the cathedral in paintings and sculpture. The walls display a variety of elaborately framed paintings, forming a gallery of works by several great masters. The most renowned are the fifteen by El Greco, including his El Expolio (The Disrobing of Christ) on the high altar, framed by marblework and a pair of Corinthian columns. This painting underwent cleaning and conservation at the Prado in Madrid, returning in 2014. There are also works by Luis de Morales, Pedro de Orrente, Juan Pantoja de la Cruz, Juan de Borgoña, Luis Tristán, Anthony van Dyck, Francisco Goya (The Arrest of Christ), Bassano the Younger and others. In addition to the paintings, there is a collection of valuable objects, most especially the Rich Bible of Saint Louis, which belonged to the king of France and dates from 1250; it has 750 miniatures on the cover and 5,000 more distributed in the manuscript pages of its three volumes. This was an acquisition of Alfonso X of Castile.

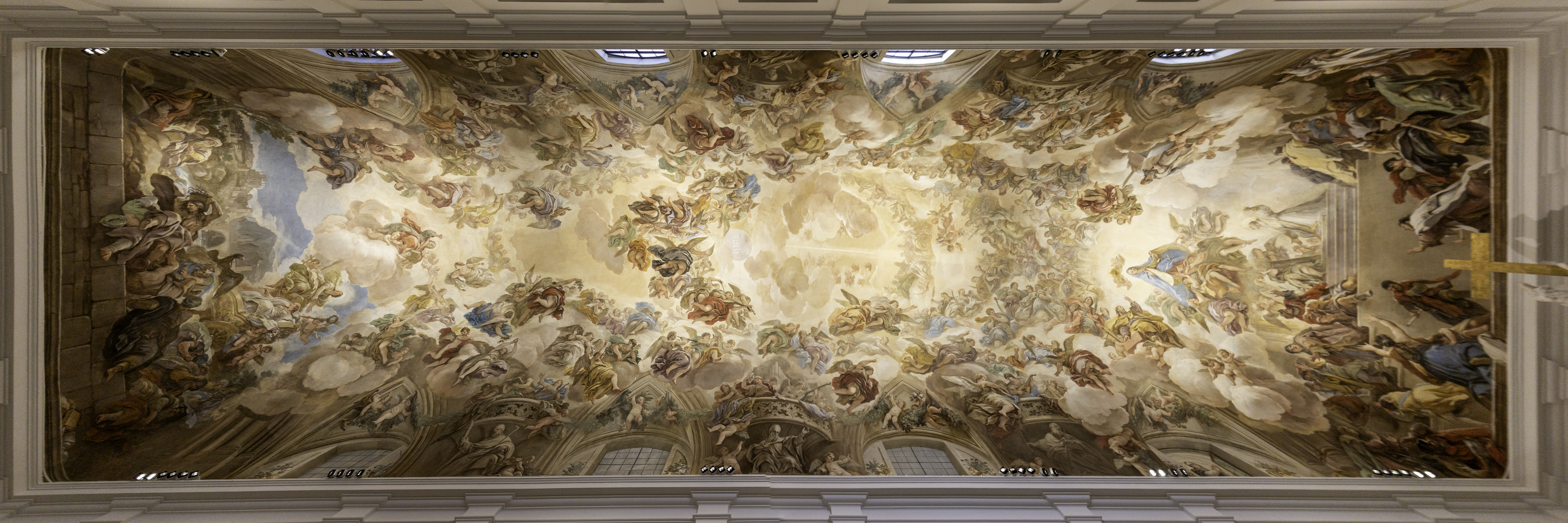
Ceiling fresco by Luca Giordano

In the next room is the vestuary with the ceiling groins painted by Claudio Coello and José Donoso. In this space are found several paintings: Titian's portrait Pope Paul III, Velázquez's Cardinal Gaspar de Borja, Caravaggio's John the Baptist and Giovanni Bellini's Burial of Christ.

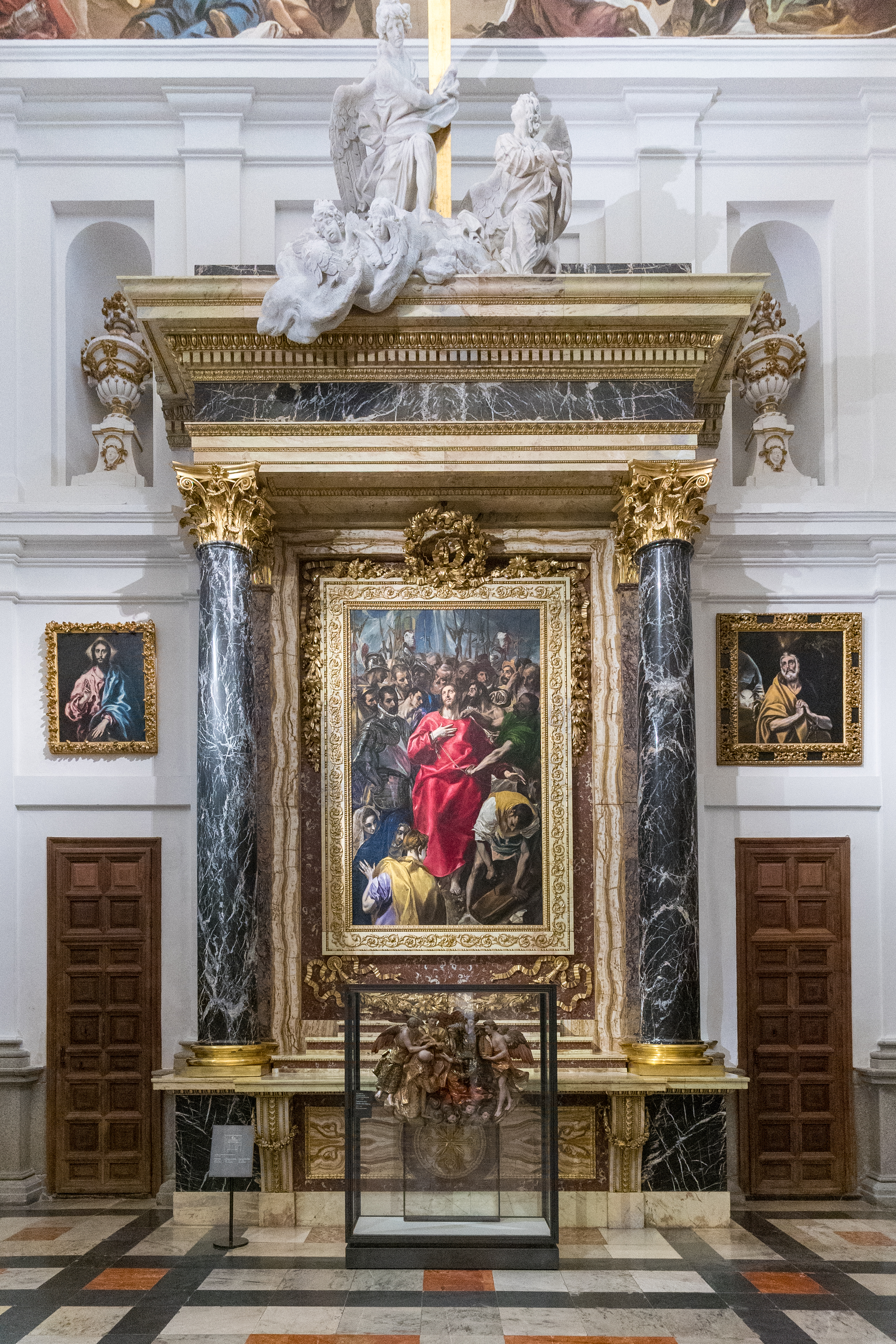
The Disrobing of Christ, 1579, by El Greco

One of the apartments contains a collection of garments that includes many valuable pieces. There are a total of 70 suits here; these include vestments of the 16th and 17th centuries, some embroidered by the father of Alonso de Covarrubias, who held the office of the vestuary. The cope of archbishop Sancho of Aragón, son of James I of Aragon, is noteworthy; it is embroidered with heraldic emblems. Another good example is the cope of Cardinal Gil de Albornoz, with Gothic embroidery of scenes from the Bible and lives of the Saints, principally English. The collection also contains the zucchetto and an embroidered lappet of the great tiara that Charles I of Spain wore at his coronation in Aachen.

There is an Arab standard on display here as well, won in the Battle of Rio Salado, and a collection of tapestry with more than seventy exemplary pieces. There are sketches by Rubens, the gift of Archbishop Fernández Portocorracero, which he commissioned expressly for the cathedral. Some of these are hung on the walls of the cathedral during the feast days of Corpus Christi.

==== Chapel of the Virgin of the Tabernacle ====
Along with the adjacent chapel called the Chapel of the Eighths, this chapel is the best example of the Herrerian building style in the cathedral. The grandeur of its new structure and ornamentation in the stark Herrerian style of the latter 16th century is owed to Cardinal Bernardo de Rojas y Sandoval. These works were begun by Nicolás de Vergara el Mozo and finished around 1616. Juan Bautista Monegro and Jorge Manuel Theotocópuli (son of the painter El Greco) participated in the project as well.

The chapel is under the protection of the Virgin of the Tabernacle, a Roman-style carving which was plated in silver in the 13th century and later dressed with a mantle studded in pearls. This image has always been called by the name 'Saint Mary'. Tradition holds that it belonged to the Apostles and was brought to Toledo by Saint Eugene. Also entering into the legend is the fact that it was hidden during the period of Muslim rule and restored later by King Alfonso VI.

The walls are clad in marblework and the great dome is supported by pendentives. On the north wall is the altar with an image of the Virgin and in one of the side walls, the sepulchre of Cardinal Sandoval y Rojas.

==== Chapel of the Eighths ====
This chapel is so named because of its octagonal plan, though it is sometimes called the Chapel of the Reliquary for the many relics kept there. The entrance to this chapel is by two doors flanking the altar of the chapel of the Tabernacle. The walls are decorated with marblework. The chapel is crowned by a dome with a roof lantern cupola, the work of Jorge Manuel Theotocópuli, while the interior of the dome itself was decorated by the painters Francisco Ricci and Juan Carreño. In the altars semi-detached to the walls are historically and artistically interesting reliquaries. The relics include a piece of the veil of Saint Leocadia (the Hispano-Roman Toledan virgin) which, according to the legend, was cut by Saint Ildephonsus off the saint's person when she appeared in the year 666. It is said that Recceswinth lent his knife to the saint to perform this act; the knife is also kept as a relic.

=== Stained glass windows ===
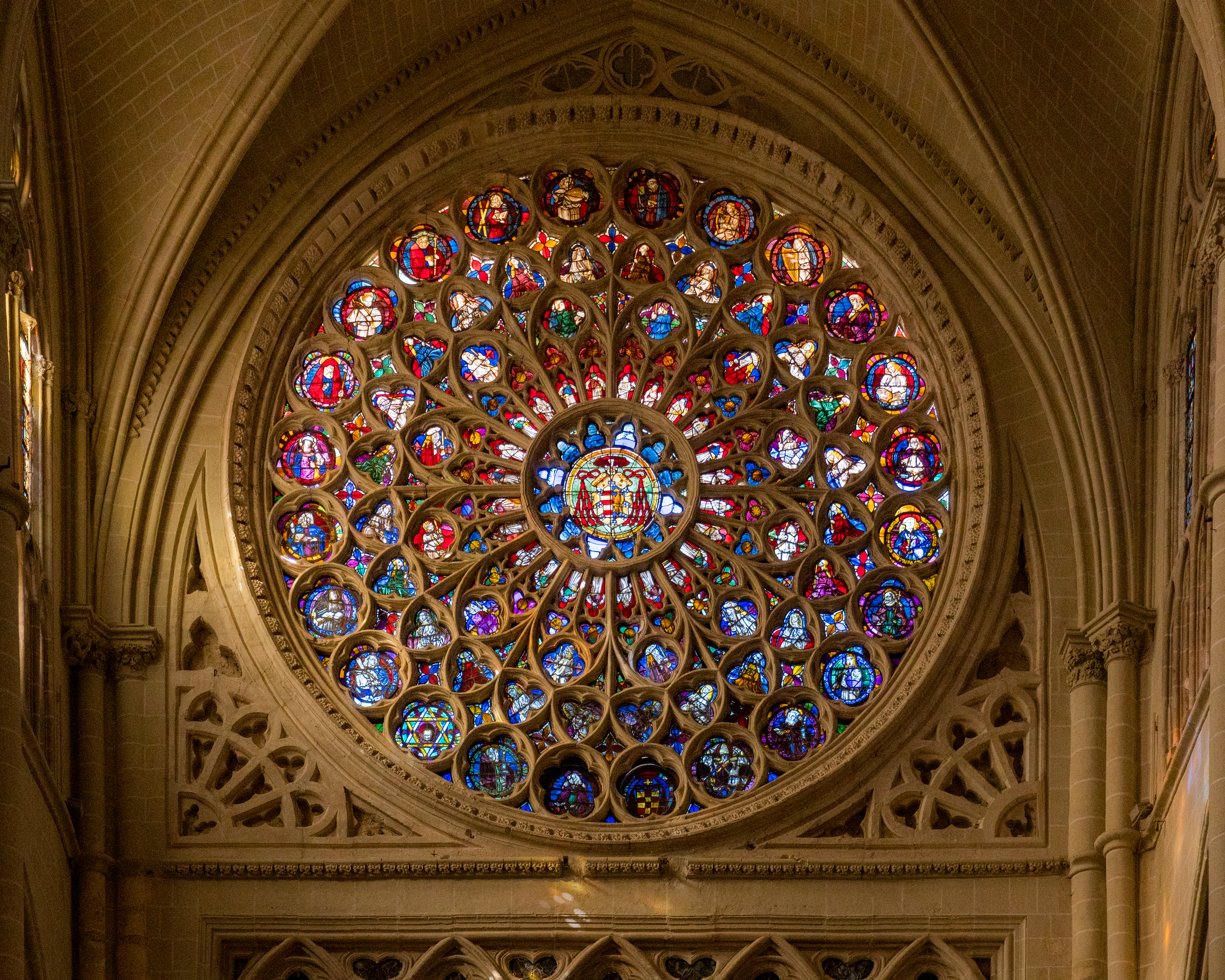
The rosette from the west façade

The stained glass windows together constitute an impressive, important collection of artworks. The Cathedral of Saint Mary of Toledo is one of the Castilian buildings that preserves the most medieval stained glass windows. They were produced from the 14th to the 17th centuries; restorations were done in the 18th century, according to changes in style that had evolved with the passing of the years.

The oldest, and also the most appreciated, are those of the Rose Window of the transept (over the Portal of the Clock) and some of those of the ambulatory, even though these are less colorful. Then there are those of the main chapel and those of the north aisle of the transept on the east side that display large figures of saints and apostles.

The makers of many of the 15th-century windows are documented. It is known that those of the main chapel and some of the transept were created by the glass-maker Jacobo Dolfin and his servant Luis, and those of the southern transept and some large windows of the main nave on the Epistle side, by the masters Pedro Bonifacio, Cristóbal, and the German monk Pedro. Later, works by the Toledan master Enrique appear.

The stained glass windows of the 16th century are adorned with figures done in Renaissance style. On these worked such renowned masters as Vasco de Troya (in 1502), Juan de Cuesta (1506) and Alejo Ximénez (1509–1513), who worked on those of the side naves and of the west façade. The stained glass windows of the Rose Window and of the Portal of the Lions are by Nicolás de Vergara el Mozo.

At the beginning of the 18th century, new stained glass was made to replace that which had been damaged. The artist Francisco Sánchez Martínez (one of the last glass-makers of the cathedral) was one of the better restorers, even though no new designs were produced and the old motifs were repeated. During the Spanish Civil War the glass deteriorated badly, but in the latter years of the 20th century a great restoration effort was undertaken and some of the brilliance of former periods was revived.

=== Transparente ===
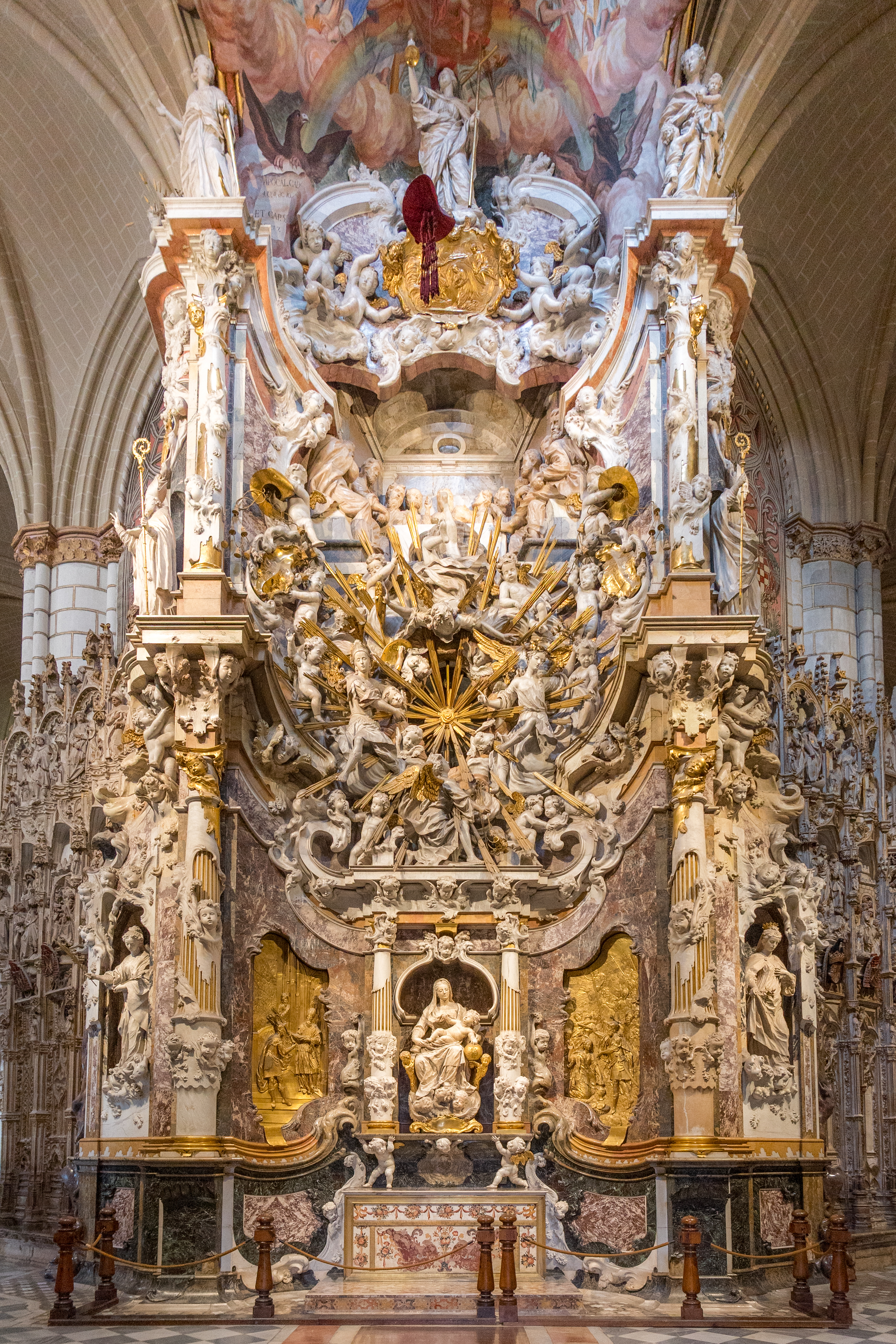
Transparente (1732) by Narciso Tomé

One of the most outstanding features of the Cathedral is the Baroque altarpiece called El Transparente. Its name refers to the unique illumination provided by a large skylight cut very high up into the thick wall across the ambulatory behind the high altar, and another hole cut into the back of the altarpiece itself to allow shafts of sunlight to strike the tabernacle. This lower hole also allows persons in the ambulatory to see through the altarpiece to the tabernacle, so that they are seeing through its transparency, so to speak. The work was commissioned by Diego de Astorga y Céspedes, Archbishop of Toledo, who wished to mark the presence of the Holy Sacrament with a glorious monument.

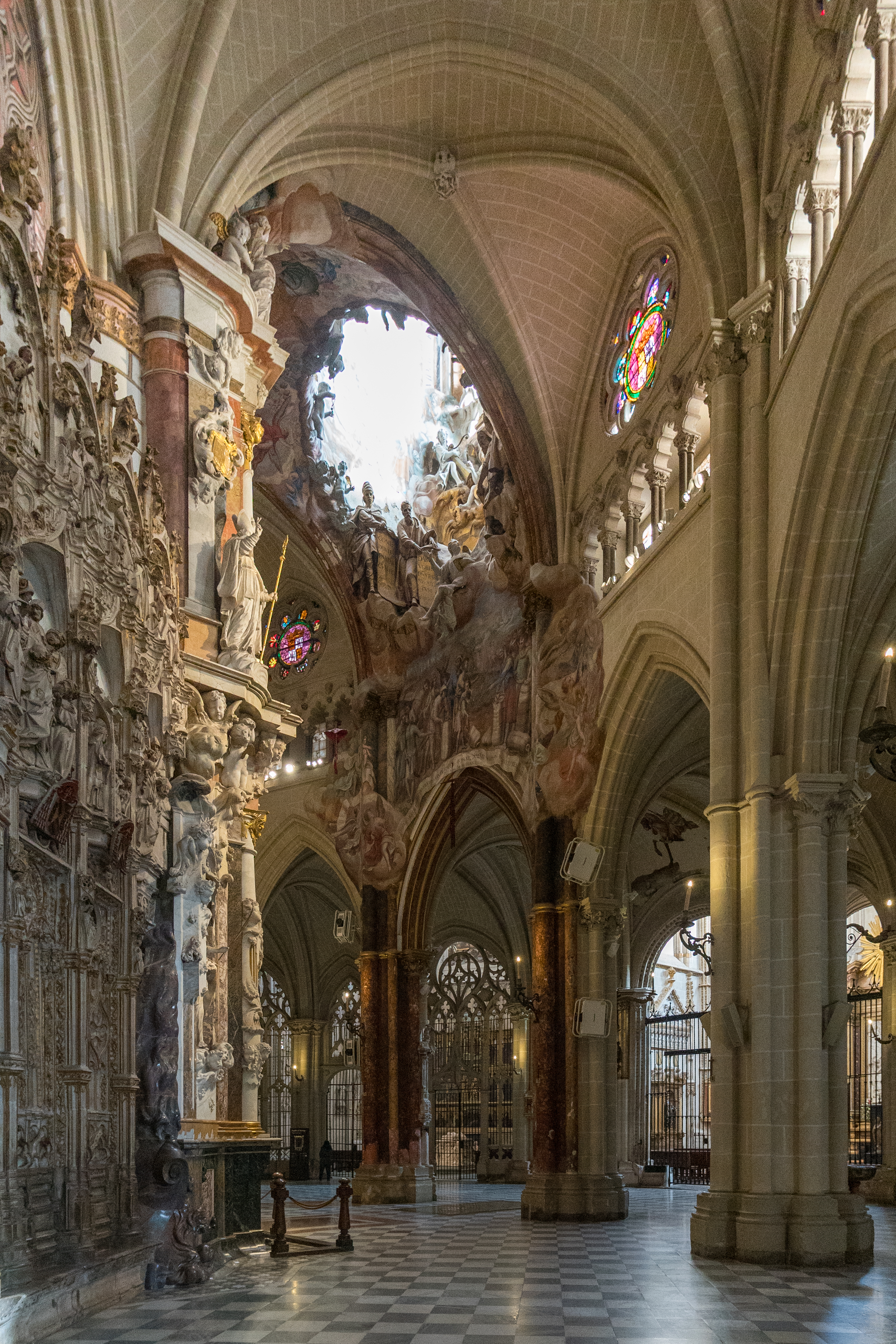
The Transparente on the side (left) and its window

El Transparente is several storeys high and is fitted with fantastic figures done in stucco, painting, bronze castings, and multiple colors of marble; it is a masterpiece of Baroque mixed media by Narciso Tomé and his four sons (two architects, one painter and one sculptor). The illumination is enhanced when the Mass is being said in the mornings and the sun shines from the east, shafts of sunlight from the appropriately oriented skylight striking the tabernacle through the hole in the back of the retable, giving the impression that the whole altar is rising to heaven. The fully Baroque display contrasts strongly with the predominant Gothic style of the cathedral. The cathedral is also illuminated through more than 750 stained glass windows from the 14th, 15th and 16th centuries, the work of some of the best masters of the times.

=== The Renaissance Rejería in the cathedral ===
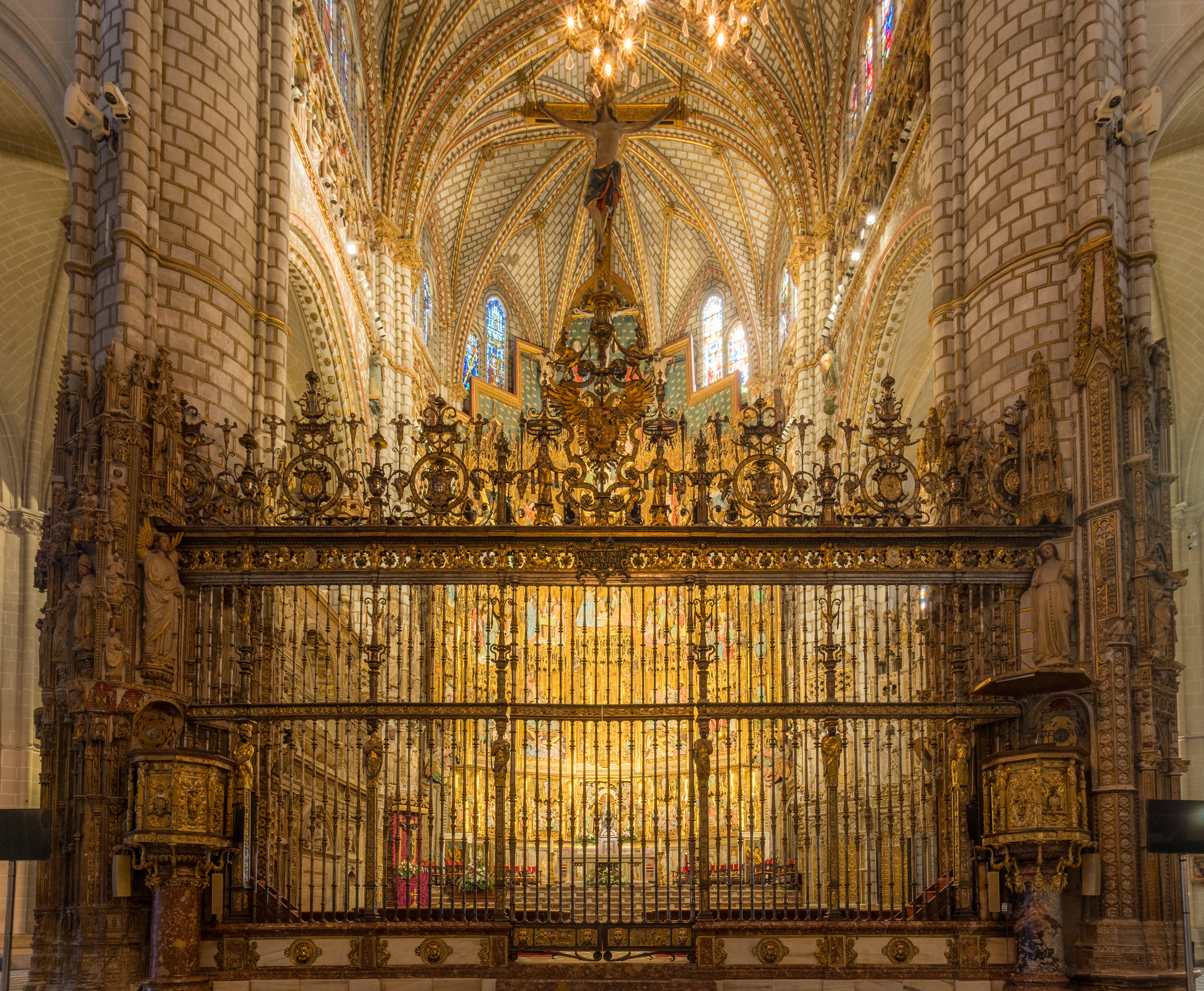
The Hight Altar grille

In the 16th century, the rejas, or decorative ironwork screens placed in front of the choir, the chapels, and sometimes even the altars, were made in Renaissance style. Their bars, columns, and crests were made with great delicacy and often included fine gold work. The bar is the principal element articulating or dividing the sections, sometimes serving as a support for candelabra and tenebrarios (triangular candelabra). In their manufacture they were worked first in the forge by hammer and anvil and then by lathe. The Renaissance screens are divided into two or three horizontal levels by transverse bars which in turn are vertically divided by columns which were intercalated between the thinner upright bars. Almost all are adorned with mythological figures, medallions, candelabra and crestings. They were forged of iron and later plated in gold or silver. The master rejeros (reja-makers) who worked in the cathedral were: Domingo de Céspedes, Francisco de Villalpando, Juan Francés and Julio Pascual.

=== Main Treasure of the cathedral ===
The Chapel of the Treasure is located in the old chapel of Saint John, occupying the site of the former tower chapel, called the Quo Vadis. It stands before the Mozárabe chapel, on the north side, directly below the cathedral tower. In reality, it was never a true chapel, instead it served as sacristy to the chapel of the New Monarchs before its transfer. It was designed and built in 1537 by Alonso de Covarrubias, in the Renaissance style. Since 1870 this has been the repository of the Cathedral Treasure, called Las Alhajas, or "The Jewels".

The building has an unusual façade, designed by Covarrubias. Because it was intended originally to be the burial chapel of Cardinal Juan Pardo de Tavera, its sculptures allude as much to his death as to his life. This façade consists of a closed, round arch framed by two very ornate columns; the linteled door is open. Covarrubias carved a bust of Saint John the Baptist on the tympanum (the space between the arch and the lintel), inside of a medallion or tondo supported by tenantes, or standing figures, one on each side, sculpted as angels in human form; John the Baptist was the patron saint of Cardinal Tavera. Above is a niche which contains the sculptural group depicting the events of the Quo Vadis legend over a floor of shells, in an allusion to death; this is the work of the sculptor Olarte. The group is enclosed by balustraded columns of rich ornamentation. On both sides of the niche is the coat of arms of Cardinal Tavera (repeated in smaller size in the tympanum) and below them, the coat of arms of the canon Diego López de Ayala, who was a great patron of the cathedral.

The Chapel of the Treasure has an artesonado ceiling, painted in gold and black, with carved flowers and figures. In its interior are multiple glass display cabinets that hold the treasure of the cathedral, which consists of liturgical objects, relics, crosiers, clothing, etc., including the mantle of the Virgen del Sagrario embroidered by Felipe Corral, which is made of twelve yards of silver cloth, entirely covered with gold, pearls, rubies, sapphires and emeralds. There are two carvings, one by Juan Martínez Montañés and another by Pedro de Mena. A noteable piece in the Treasure is the Custodia, the monumental monstrance by Enrique de Arfe.

==== The Great Monstrance of Arfe ====
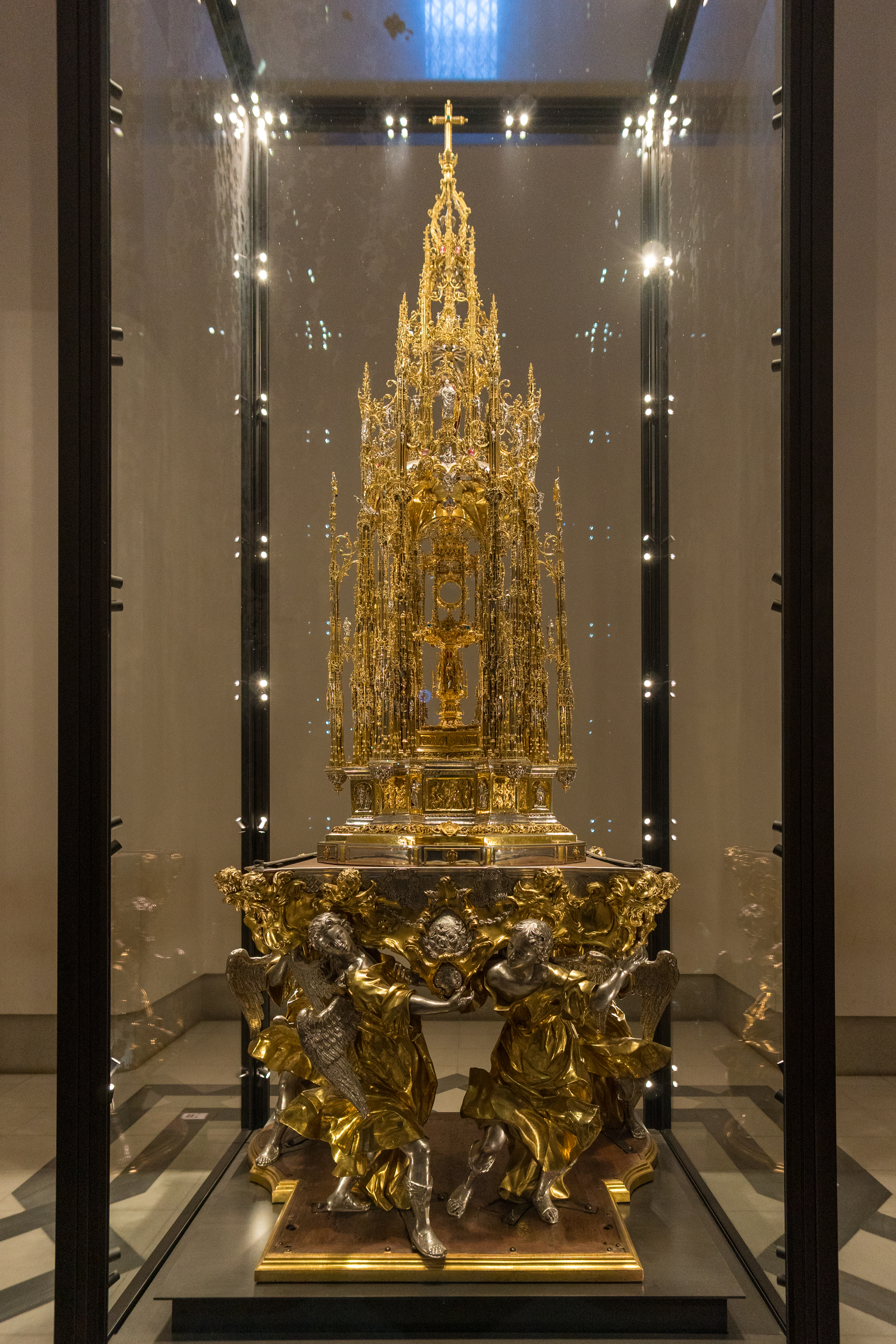
The Monstrance

The most important object kept in the Chapel of the Treasure is the great Monstrance of Arfe, also known as La Gran Ostensoria de Toledo. Made of the finest silver and gold and bejeweled with gems, it measures over ten feet tall. The monstrance is famous for being used in the annual feast of Corpus Christi of Toledo.

The creator of the Great Monstrance was the metalworker Enrique de Arfe, born Heinrich von Harff, originally from Jülich or Harff near Cologne, Germany. Arfe labored on it from 1517–1524, on commission to Cardinal Cisneros. It is of late Gothic design. This triumph of the silversmith's craft is in the form of a Gothic temple, with all the architectural details, such as columns, arches, and vaultings, the whole resembling a delicate lacework. Scenes from the life of the Saviour are illustrated in relief. It has two hundred and sixty statuettes of various sizes, all exhibiting the same skill in workmanship. The Great Monstrance has a hexagonal base, and rises on small exquisitely made columns, with adornments of gems and varied figurines of angels and saints, fleurons, small bells and clappers. The work is crowned in the uppermost section by a 17th-century cross. The pedestal on which it sits is in the Baroque style of the 18th century. Originally made of silver, Archbishop Quiroga commissioned its gilding to match the gold plated wood of the monstrance of the altar; it was gilded in 1595 by Valdivieso and Morino. Today it is encased under bulletproof glass and heavily guarded by an automatic security system within the grounds of the cathedral.

In the Middle Ages, Cardinal Cisneros wanted to compete for a grander monstrance than that of Isabella the Catholic, and to show it off in the procession of the Corpus Christi of Toledo, which at the time was the most important feast in the Kingdom of Castile. The monstrance took seven years to create and its cost surpassed 15 million maravedís, of which Arfe received the stipulated 2,700 reales. He was awarded a bonus of 2,500 maravedís that the cathedral's chapter presented to him on Christmas of 1523, having been impressed by the magnificence of his work.

Since 1595, it has been customary to carry the monstrance in the procession of the Corpus Christi, on a float made for this purpose with an adjustable leveling which is mechanically activated. In the procession, political and ecclesiastical dignitaries proceed ahead of the monstrance and behind it the cadets of the Infantry Academy. The monstrance comprises 5,600 different pieces held together by 12,500 bolts and decorated with 260 figurines. Eighteen kilograms of 18 karat gold and 183 kilograms of pure silver were used in its fabrication; it is said to contain the first gold brought by Columbus from the New World.

The inscription on the Monstrance of Arfe reads as follows:

Don Francisco Jiménez Cardinal Cisneros, Cardinal Archbishop of Toledo, Governor of Spain and conqueror of Africa, commissioned this monstrance of the Most Holy Body of Christ to be made, which was finished during the vacant see, being the work of Diego López de Ayala. Year of the Lord 1524.

On World Youth Day in 2011, the Monstrance of Arfe was brought out of the Cathedral of Toledo into the Cuatro Vientos airport, where it was used for the Eucharistic Adoration presided over by Pope Benedict XVI.

=== Monarchs buried in the cathedral ===
Throughout Spanish history, several monarchs have wanted to be buried in the Primatial Cathedral of Toledo. Therefore, located in different parts of the cathedral, are found the sepulchres of the:

Monarchs of León

Sancha II, 1230, Queen of León

Monarchs of Castile

Sancho III the Desired, 1157–1158, in the Main Chapel

Monarchs of Castile and León

Alfonso VII the Emperor, 1126–1157, the Main Chapel
Sancho IV the Brave, 1284–1295, the Main Chapel
Henry II, 1369-1379, and his wife Juana Manuel, the Chapel of the New Monarchs
John I, 1379-1390, the Chapel of the New Monarchs
Henry III the Infirm, 1390–1406, and his wife, Catherine of Lancaster (1373–1418), the Chapel of the New Monarchs
John II, 1406-1454, the Chapel of the New Monarchs: a cenotaph; his body is buried in the Chapterhouse of Miraflores, in Burgos

Monarchs of Portugal

Sancho II the Pious, 1223–1248, dispossessed of the throne, fled in exile to Toledo, died on 4 January 1248 and was buried in the city's cathedral (historically assumed)

== Cloister ==
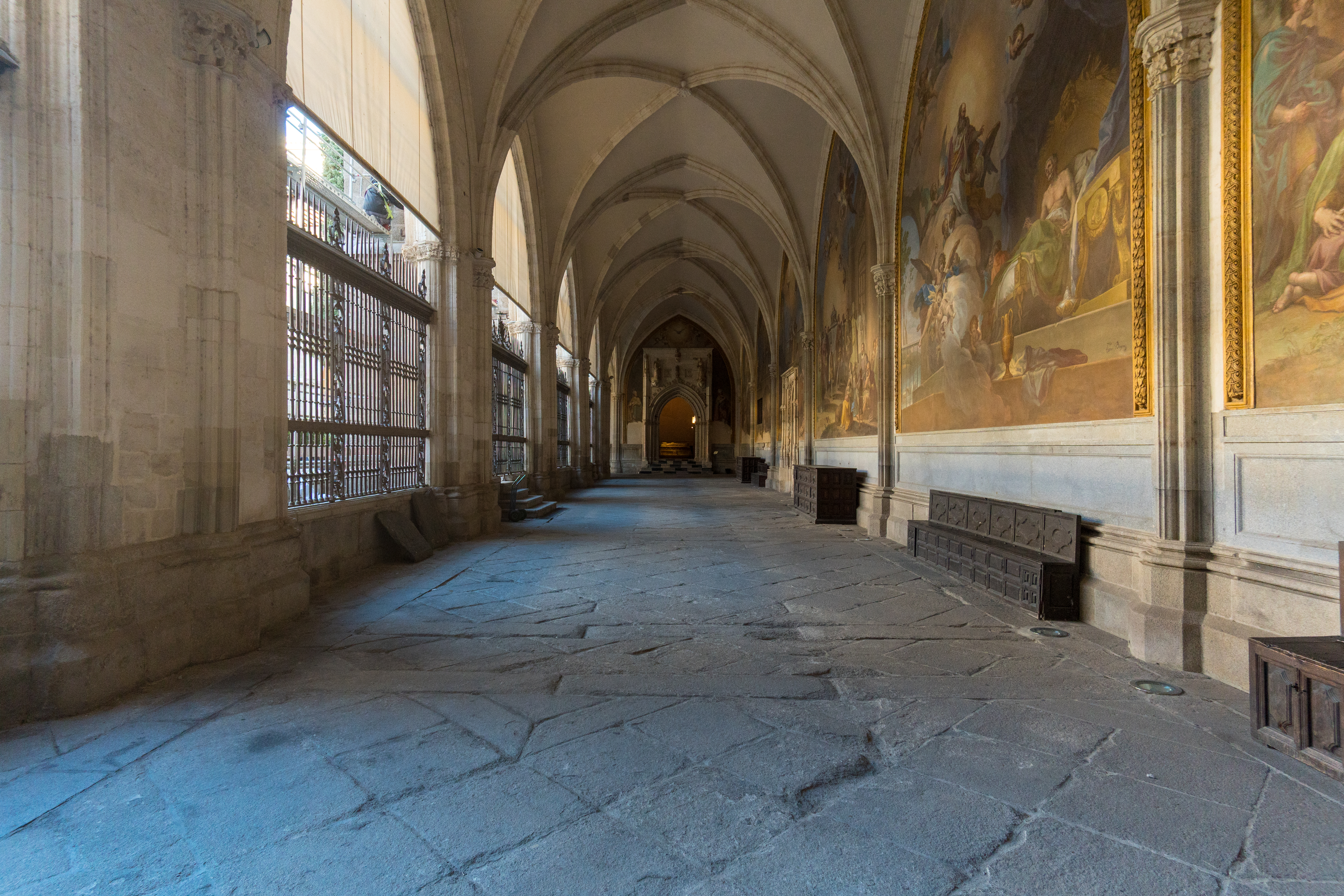
Cloister and frescoes

On the site of the old al-cana or alcana (Jewish commercial district), on the north side of the cathedral, Archbishop Pedro Tenorio planned the cloister and a chapel which would serve as his sepulchre.

The building of the Cloister was begun on 14 August 1389, and finished in 1425. The architect Rodrigo Alfonso and master builder Alvar Martínez supervised the construction of the four corridors with quadripartite vaults. The history of the building was not without intrigue. Since the local market fair was held in the very place where Archbishop Pedro Tenorio planned to build his cloister, the owners of the stands and shops there were reluctant from the start. The historian Eugenio Narbona recounted the desire of the archbishop to occupy as soon as possible the site of "the markets, which is the place where the merchandise is sold." During negotiations between the archbishop and the owners over purchase and price, a massive fire destroyed the entire market. Tenorio took advantage of this fortuitous event for his own purposes, and here enters the legend—he was accused of having caused the disaster to facilitate his acquisition of the desired plots.

Given the topography of its location, the ground level for the foundations of the cloister was raised nearly five feet above the level of the floor plan of the cathedral, and in a way that it could in future support the weight of the two heights, which came to pass upon the investiture of Cardinal Cisneros. Archbishop Tenorio did not spare any effort in ensuring that the grandeur and majesty of the cloister was worthy of a Gothic cathedral. In the galleries on the ground floor there is a series of frescoes depicting scenes of the lives of the Saints Eugenio, Casilda, and Eladio. Eleven of these are by Bayeu and two by de Maella.

It is worth noting that there being no monastic order in the cathedral, the cloister and other sections built along its perimeter had very different functions at various times: from storeroom to classroom, and as a centre of mercantile transactions (regaining the sense of the old alcana), or of prayer (one of its rooms was a Mozarabic chapel). The Cloister later served as the town hall.

=== The Chapel of Saint Blaise ===
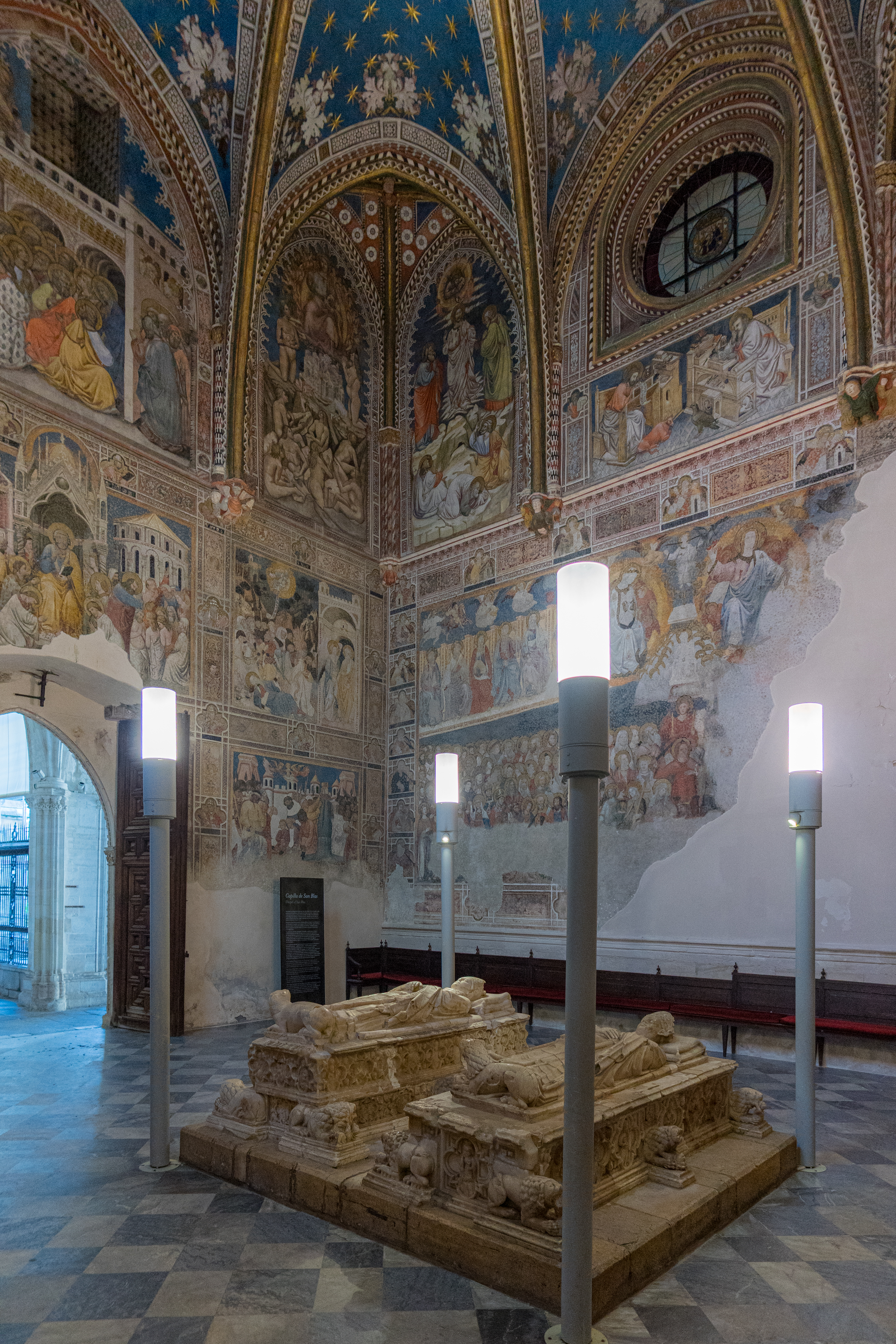
Chapel of Saint Blaise

The Chapel of Saint Blaise was commissioned by Archbishop Tenorio as well. Built on the lower level of the cathedral grounds, and entered from the Cloister itself, it is roofed by an octopartite vault in a reminder of the chapel's purpose as a burial chamber. The starting date of its construction is debated, although the period from 1389 to 1398 is generally accepted. It is certain that the building was finished shortly before the death of Archbishop Tenorio on 10 May 1399. The archbishop prepared a written consecration to Saint Blaise, leaving the manuscript behind at his death; his will stipulated the rents to be collected for the maintenance of the chapel, and required the cathedral Chapter to take over its management.

The chapel is situated about twenty-three feet below street level, the archbishop having ordered the ground outside the building raised with fill, a circumstance that in the long run caused many problems with humidity, which had a devastating effect on the artworks of the lower interior walls. This decision was made after construction was well along due to the cluttered impression the building gave the eye.

The chapel is decorated in two different parts. First, from the cornice to the ceiling, the Apostles' Creed is represented in fourteen scenes in the manner of the dial of a clock. At the lower part beneath the cornice is a painting of the Final Judgement and scenes of the Lives of the Saints. The authorship of the works is not clear, even though it remains attributed without a doubt to Florentine painters, among whom are mentioned as very probably the artists: Gherardo Starnina and Nicolás de Antonio. Deterioration caused by excessive humidity and some badly done restorations have damaged the paintings closest to the floor, in some cases irremediably.

At the beginning of the 21st century, a profound conservation-restoration of the paintings of the Chapel of Saint Blaise was inaugurated to stabilise the frescoes and restore the splendour of their original colors, with the exception of those unsalvageable fragments on the lowest portions of the walls. A second undertaking is nearly finished—the elimination of the water seeping through the walls from the street Hombre de Palo, which could damage the collection again.

== Music of the cathedral ==
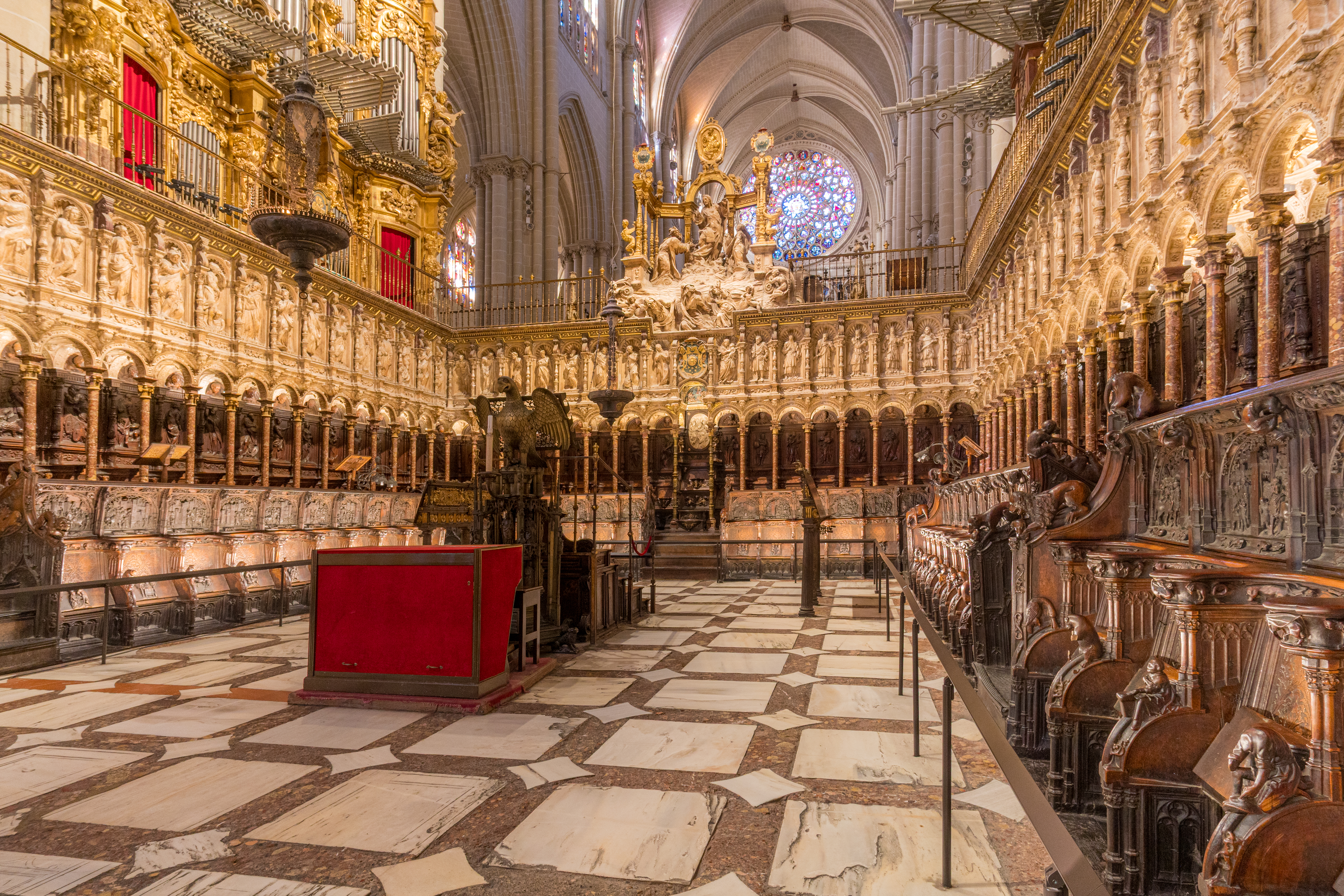
Choir

As the Renaissance advanced through Europe and with it religious music from the monasteries, devotional music became a key part of the Eucharistic liturgy. To enhance the grandeur of the cathedral an impressive ritual was provided in which music has the mission of embracing the architectural work and amplifying the glorification of God. Since 1440, polyphonic vocal pieces spread rapidly throughout Castile and Aragon. Instrumental music was produced by the organ, which soon found a place in the cathedrals and the churches of the Archpriests.

In the cathedral of Toledo, the most important organ is the so-called "Organ of the Emperor" in the transept of the cathedral. Next are the so-called "General", the organ made by Fray Joseph de Echevarría, and the organ made by José Verdalonga (1796–1797), located in the choir. Cardinal Cisneros, with the reform of the chapel of the Corpus Christi for the Mozarabic rite, which had its own music, introduced another organ in the chapel. Others are also found in the rest of the important chapels: that of the New Monarchs (which has two), of the Alcázar, of the Virgin of the Sacristy, and of Saint Peter.

The organ was not the only important musical instrument. With the passing of the years, wind instruments (flageolets, flutes and sackbuts), harps and other string instruments, like the so-called viola, which served as an accompaniment to the vocal music, were introduced. With the creation of the Chapel of Music, throughout the 16th and the 17th centuries the oboe and the double bass were being incorporated into the celebration of the Mass, before the flageolet and the sackbut.

The "Six-Piece", or children's choir, of the cathedral was created as a vocal group by Cardinal Silíceo who, on 22 July 1557, founded for its members the College of Our Lady of the Infantes, even though the existence of moços (boys) who sang in the liturgical services was already mentioned in the 12th century. They were and are the Choir of the Cathedral and of the Chapel of Music. In its constitution of the 16th century, its red clothing was already established, which the students still wear with a white surplice. In the College lived, generally, the Maestro de Capilla and other professors with the boys; who supervised their development, which included, for a time, their incorporation into the Royal University of Toledo. The constitutional charter of the College, drafted by Silíceo on 9 May 1557, specifically instructed in its sixth point:

... we order that another master be found to instruct the said altarboys to sing plainchant and organ chant and counterpoint, of whom the same information is found, is twenty-one years old, conforming to the Statute, a Priest, and of good repute and name and well learned in the faculty of Music, who will teach the altarboys a lesson of how to sing on all the festival days and Sundays one hour before eating, and another after having eaten, and another at the end of the day, and on the other school days, each day a lesson after having dined.

Among the maestros de capilla, Cristóbal de Morales, who composed Emendemus in melius and Peccatem me Quotidie, was preeminent; he had worked in the Sistine Chapel of Rome and composed twenty-one masses and more than seventy motets. Other maestros de capilla were Matías Durango de los Arcos, Alonso Lobo, Juan Bonet de Paredes, Andrés de Torrentes, Ginés de Boluda and Francisco Juncá y Carol.

The influence of the music of the cathedral of Toledo was decisive in Spanish religious music—not only in Mozarabic chant, but also in training maestros who later moved to other dioceses such as Seville or Jaén, and in the Six-Piece choristers who formed choirs in other cathedrals, even introducing variations of Gregorian chant in the form of what is known as Cantus Eugenianus, Cantus Melodicus or Vulgo Melodía, through the efforts of the song masters of the cathedral (up to 18 masters have been recorded), figures who disappeared with the Concordat of 1851 and most of whose compositions are kept in the cathedral library.

== Model and influence of the cathedral in religious architecture ==
Bishop Rodrigo Ximénez de Rada and those who followed him used master builders who had worked in or had experience designing in the French Gothic style. The cathedrals of Paris or Le Mans were their points of reference. The constructive solutions of the French Gothic builders were well-accepted, such as counter-rests, buttresses and pointed arches; nevertheless, the Spanish builders resisted the importation of the layout of the French cathedrals, where the choir and the altar were located in impressive sanctuaries, opting for smaller ones and situating the choir in the central nave. This was the syncretic solution of the Cathedral of Santiago de Compostela, which came first; all of this developed in Spain as much by the influence of the Mozarabic rite, as also by the Visigothic tradition and the Castilian liturgy.

This historical evolution, combined with the status of the Primatial Cathedral, encouraged the adoption of the Toledan model by the rest of the Spanish cathedrals, with the exception of that of Burgos and that of León which more closely follows the French model. A similar arrangement of spaces can be seen in the cathedrals of Cádiz, of Seville, and of Palma de Mallorca, among others. And, as was foreseeable, the Spanish Empire carried the model of the Dives Toletana beyond, influencing those constructed in the Americas and the Philippines.

== Citations ==
The Cathedral of Toledo has long been widely admired by art critics and historians, and it has been extravagantly praised by some. Here are citations from authorities in the study of art and of architecture:

- The French historian and archeologist Élie Lambert (1888–1961) made a profound study of Gothic art in general and of the Cathedral of Toledo in particular. He wrote:

"The Cathedral of Toledo is a world in itself, the centuries bestowing it with such an accumulation of great works of art, very diverse one from another, that the fabulousness of its riches and the attractiveness of its diversity, produce to the point of incredulity an impression of astonishment."

- Manuel Bartolomé Cossío (1857–1935), pedagogue and Spanish university professor, made the following critique:

"The Cathedral of Toledo is the example most clearly Spanish of all Gothic architecture, and exemplifies here the transition to the Classical style; it is first in Spain and one of the most singular in the world in terms of beauty and perfection. It has resolved, by means of rectangles and triangles, the problem of the ambulatory."

- The architect, Leopoldo Torres Balbás, born in Madrid (1888–1960), says (Ars Hispaniae, VII):

"Upon entering its interior [the Cathedral of Toledo], in the enormous hall of more than 120 meters of longitude and around 60 wide, a master work of calm and harmony, we find ourselves in a world very different from that of the French cathedrals, to think of the similarity of their forms. In place of the magnificent ascendant rhythm of these, the Toledan, its five naves in steps, without great differences of height, without any theatricality, is of balanced proportions. The sanctuary has a small elevation, flattened, if we compare it to that of whichever French cathedral. In something so essential in architecture as is the feeling of space, the Castilian temple differs radically from the French models from which it is derived."

- King Alfonso X the Wise explains the reason for its construction in these terms:

"And the king with the archbishop Don Rodrigo, walking by the church of Toledo, savouring it and conversing about it, taking it for too old already; and restraining in him his wine, the spirit of God and of sanctity came into him and restrained the King don Ferdinand so that God renewed him and gave him to make many conquests of the Moors in lands that Christianity lost, which good it would be to renew by those gains the church of Saint Mary of Toledo and had this reason for very good and very right, and King Don Ferdinand and Archbishop Don Rodrigo put it into work. Then they laid the first stone of the church of Saint Mary of Toledo, the king and the archbishop, they both placed one... And the work grew marvelously from day to day."

== See also ==
- Councils of Toledo
- Late medieval domes
