= Churrigueresque =

Baroque architecture style in Spain

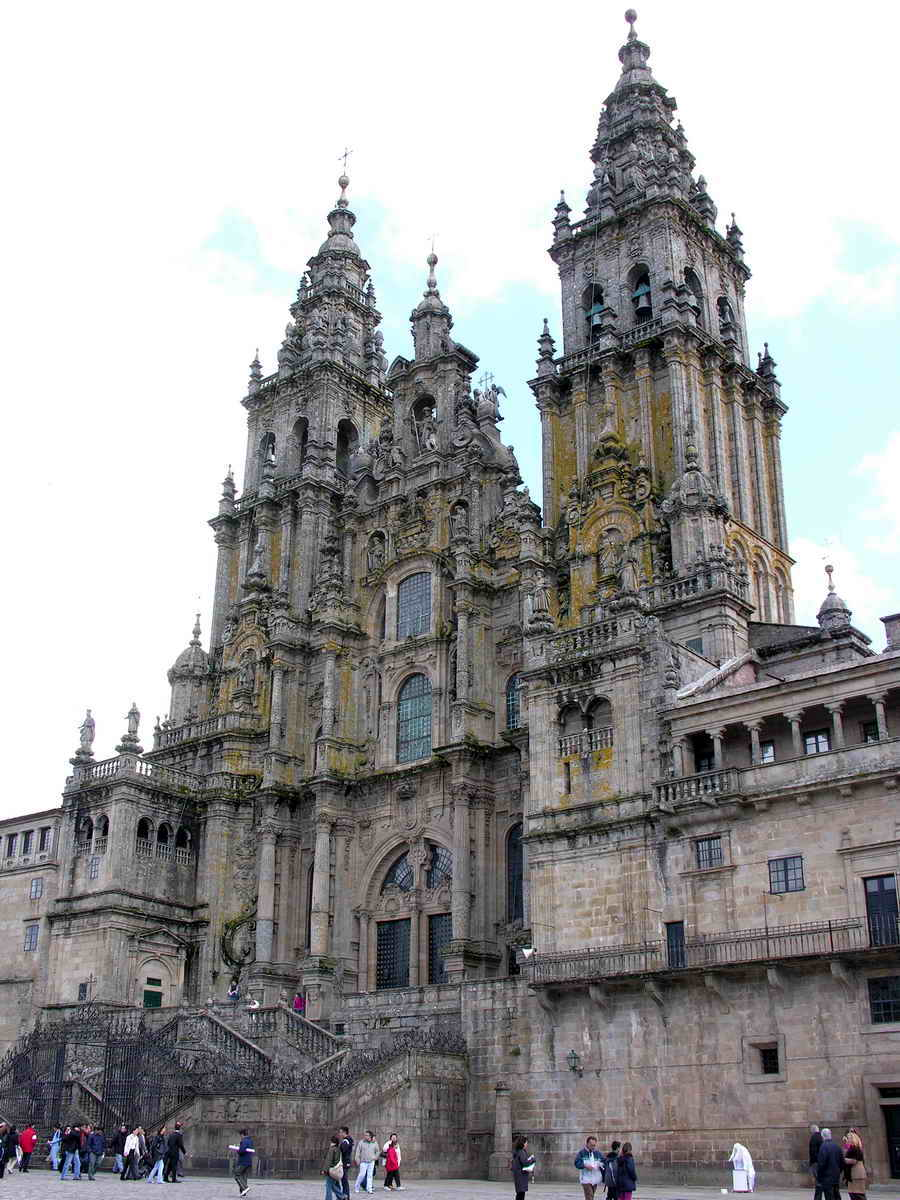
Cathedral of Santiago de Compostela in Spain. Churrigueresque Obradoiro façade

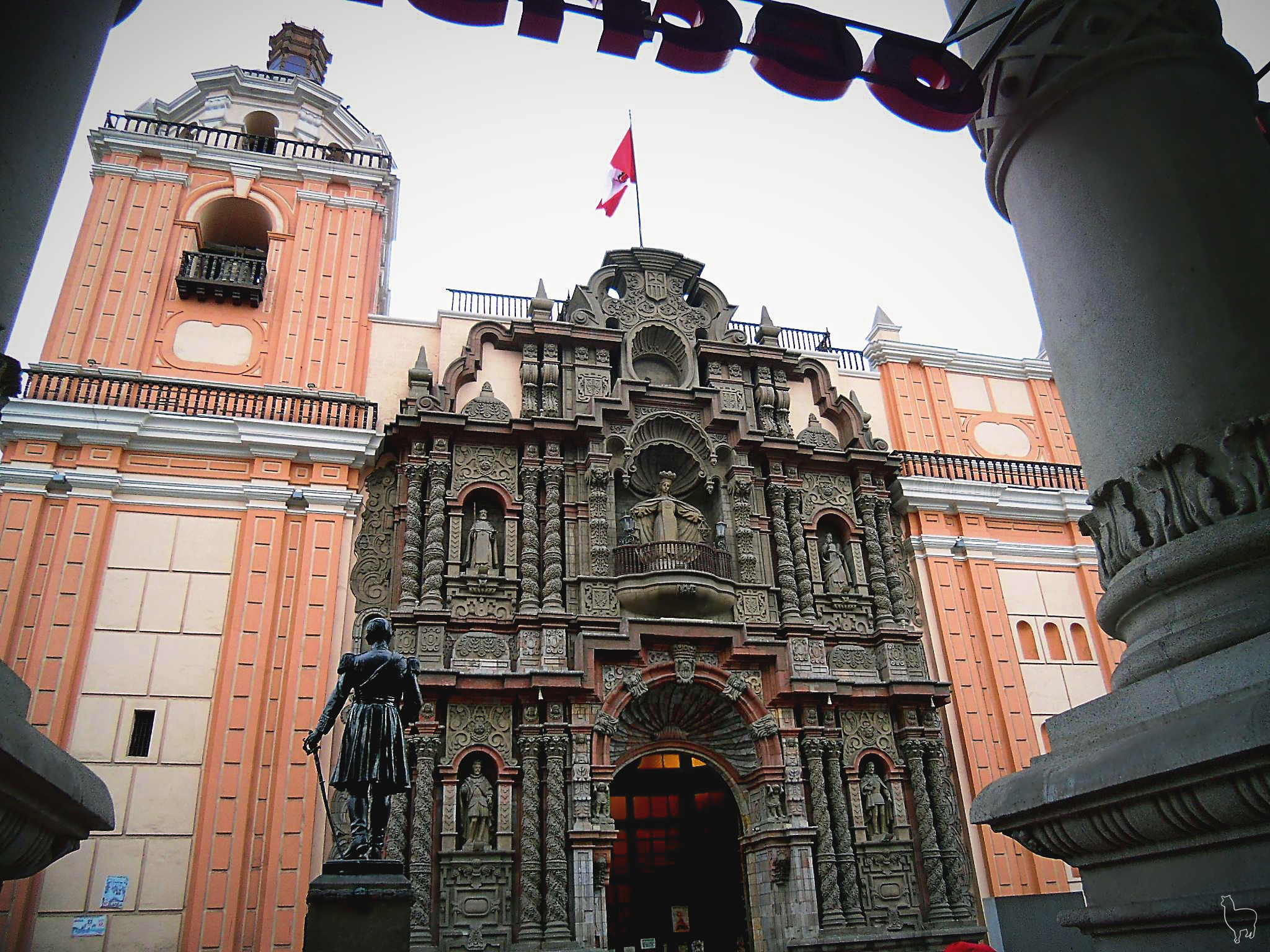
Basilica and Convent of Nuestra Señora de la Merced, Lima

Churrigueresque (/ˌtʃʊərɪɡəˈrɛsk/; Spanish: Churrigueresco), also but less commonly "Ultra Baroque", refers to a Spanish Baroque style of elaborate sculptural architectural ornament which emerged as a manner of stucco decoration in Spain in the late 17th century and was used until about 1750, marked by extreme, expressive and florid decorative detailing, normally found above the entrance on the main façade of a building.

== Origins ==
Named after the architect and sculptor José Benito de Churriguera (1665–1725), who was born in Madrid and who worked primarily in Madrid and Salamanca, the origins of the style are said to go back to an architect and sculptor named Alonso Cano, who designed the façade of the cathedral at Granada, in 1667.

A distant, early 15th century precursor of the highly elaborate Churrigueresque style can be found in the Lombard Charterhouse of Pavia.

== Development ==
The development of the style passed through three phases. Between 1680 and 1720, the Churriguera popularized Guarino Guarini's blend of Solomonic columns and composite order, known as "supreme order". Between 1720 and 1760, the Churrigueresque column, or estipite, in the shape of an inverted cone or obelisk, was established as a central element of ornamental decoration. The years from 1760 to 1780 saw a gradual shift of interest away from twisted movement and excessive ornamentation towards neoclassical balance and sobriety.

Among the highlights of the style, interiors of the Granada Charterhouse offer some of the most impressive combinations of space and light in 18th-century Europe. Integrating sculpture and architecture even more radically, Narciso Tomé achieved striking chiaroscuro effects in his Transparente for the Toledo Cathedral. Perhaps the most visually intoxicating form of the style was Mexican Churrigueresque, practiced in the mid-18th century by Lorenzo Rodriguez, whose masterpiece is the Sagrario Metropolitano (1749–69) in Mexico City, New Spain.

== Spain ==
The first of the Churriguera was José Benito de Churriguera (1665–1725), who trained as a joiner of altarpieces, drawing some very important for various churches of Salamanca, Madrid, Valladolid and other cities in Spain. Some in Spain have gone and some remain only a sites:

- Nuevo Baztán, Community of Madrid
  - Church of St Francisco Javier and Goyeneche Palace
- Salamanca, Castile and León
  - Altarpiece of Convent of San Esteban
  - Choir of the New Cathedral.
  - Plaza Mayor.
  - Capilla de la Vera Cruz
  - College of Calatrava
- Seville
  - Palace of San Telmo

== Mexico ==
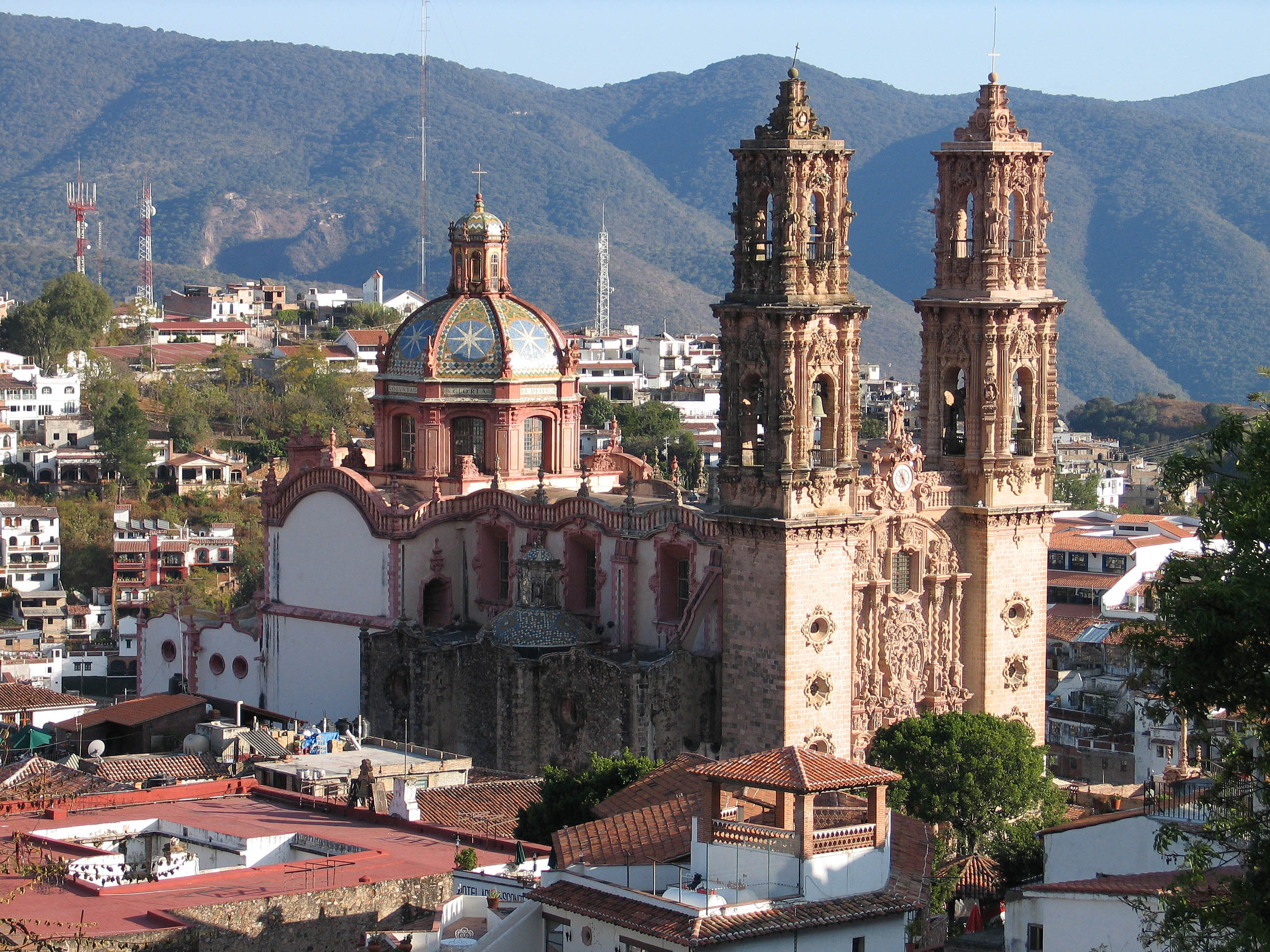
The Santa Prisca temple, in Taxco, Mexico.

In Mexico, the Cathedral Basilica of Zacatecas, capital of Zacatecas state, and the Templo de Santa Prisca, located in Taxco, Guerrero state are considered as masterpieces of Churrigueresque style. The building of Parroquia Antigua in Salamanca, Guanajuato, founded on August 24, 1603, was completed in the year 1690, and the Churrigueresque façade in 1740. The altarpiece of the church of San Francisco Javier (National Museum of Viceroyalty) in Tepotzotlán, State of Mexico is also considered, along with its façade, one of the most important baroque churrigueresque works created by the Jesuits in New Spain. The Altar de los Reyes of the Mexico City Metropolitan Cathedral and the façades of the Sagrario Metropolitano, by the Spanish architect Lorenzo Rodriguez, which is attached to the same Cathedral, are also representatives of the style.

== California Churrigueresque ==
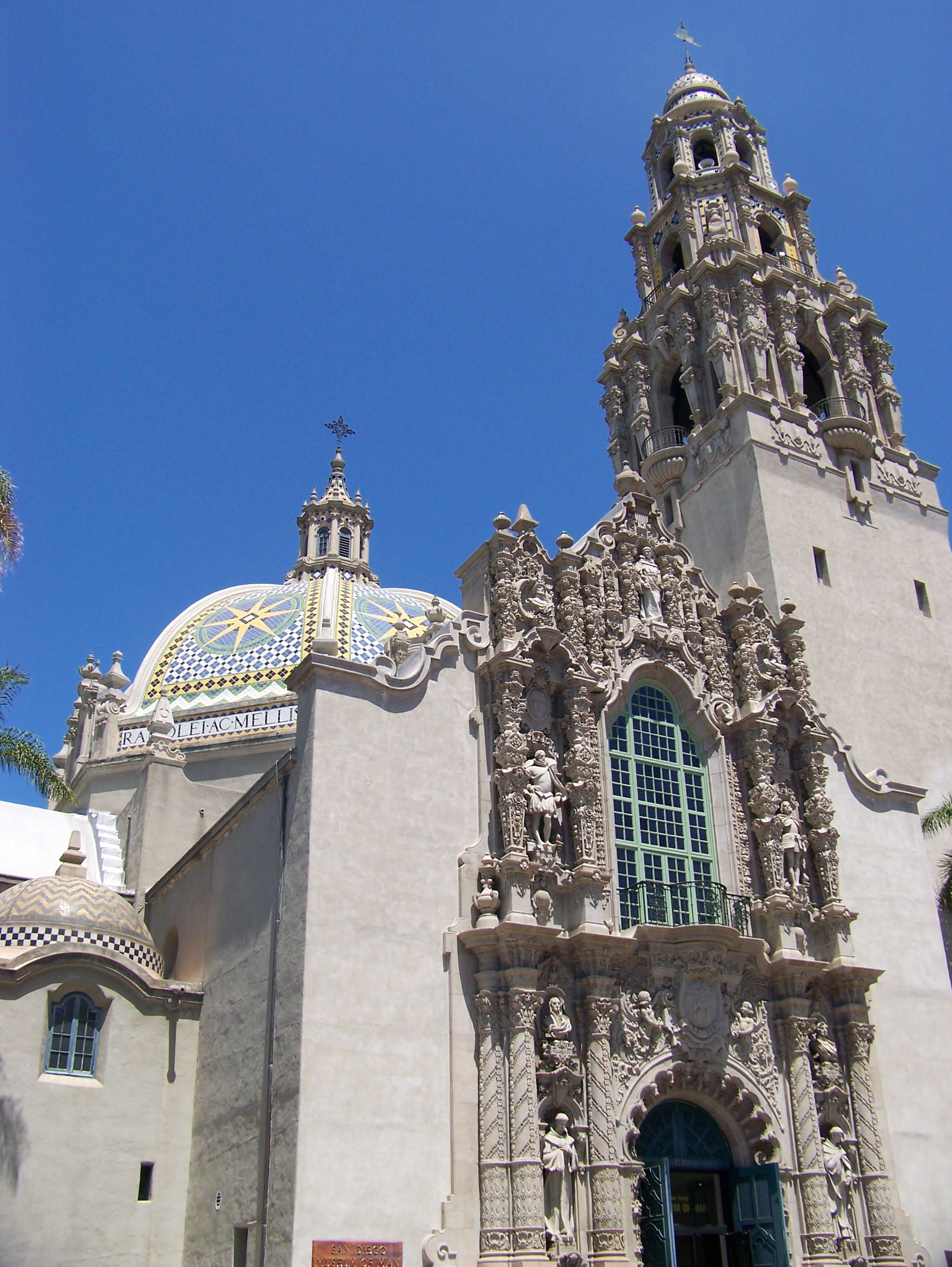
The California Quadrangle, at Balboa Park, San Diego, California. Churrigueresque Revival, inspired in the colonial Churrigueresque of the Americas

California Churrigueresque is a revival style native to California, developed in the early 20th century by architects Bertram Goodhue and Carleton Winslow Sr. for the 1915 Panama–California Exposition, which helped popularize its use in Spanish Colonial Revival architecture in California, and to a lesser extent the rest of the United States. Goodhue and Winslow developed the style after studying Churrigueresque and Plateresque ornamentation in Spanish Colonial buildings in Mexico.

Many of the best examples of California Churrigeresque are located in Balboa Park in San Diego, the site of the Panama–California Exposition. Other notable buildings in this style include San Francisco's Mission Dolores Basilica and Mission High School, the First Congregational Church of Riverside, Riverside Community College's Center for Social Justice and Civil Liberties, Los Angeles's St. Vincent de Paul Church and Million Dollar Theatre, as well as Beverly Hills City Hall. The Golden Gate Theater in East Los Angeles is another example.

The Hollywood Boulevard Commercial and Entertainment District contains several contributing properties with Churrigueresque in their design, including the Palace, El Capitan, and Warner theatres; Hollywood Roosevelt Hotel; and the Baine, Cherokee, Herman, Hollywood Studio, Pickwick Book Shop, Pig 'n Whistle, and Wax Museum buildings.

== See also ==
- Alberto de Churriguera
- New Spanish Baroque
- Baroque
- Rococo
- Spanish architecture
- Spanish Colonial architecture
- Spanish Renaissance architecture
- Architecture of Mexico
