= Calatrava =

Calatrava may refer to:

== Spain ==
- Calatrava la Vieja (originally Calatrava), Spanish medieval town
- Calatrava la Nueva, Spanish medieval castle and convent
- Colegio de Calatrava, college founded in Salamanca by the military orders that still exists

== Philippines ==
- Calatrava, Negros Occidental, a municipality in the Philippines
- Calatrava, Romblon, a municipality in the Philippines

== People ==
- Santiago Calatrava (born 1951), Spanish architect, sculptor and engineer

== Other ==
- Patek Philippe Calatrava, wristwatch brand
- Order of Calatrava, a Spanish military-religious order
