= Spanish Baroque architecture =

Architecture of the Baroque era in Spain and its former colonies

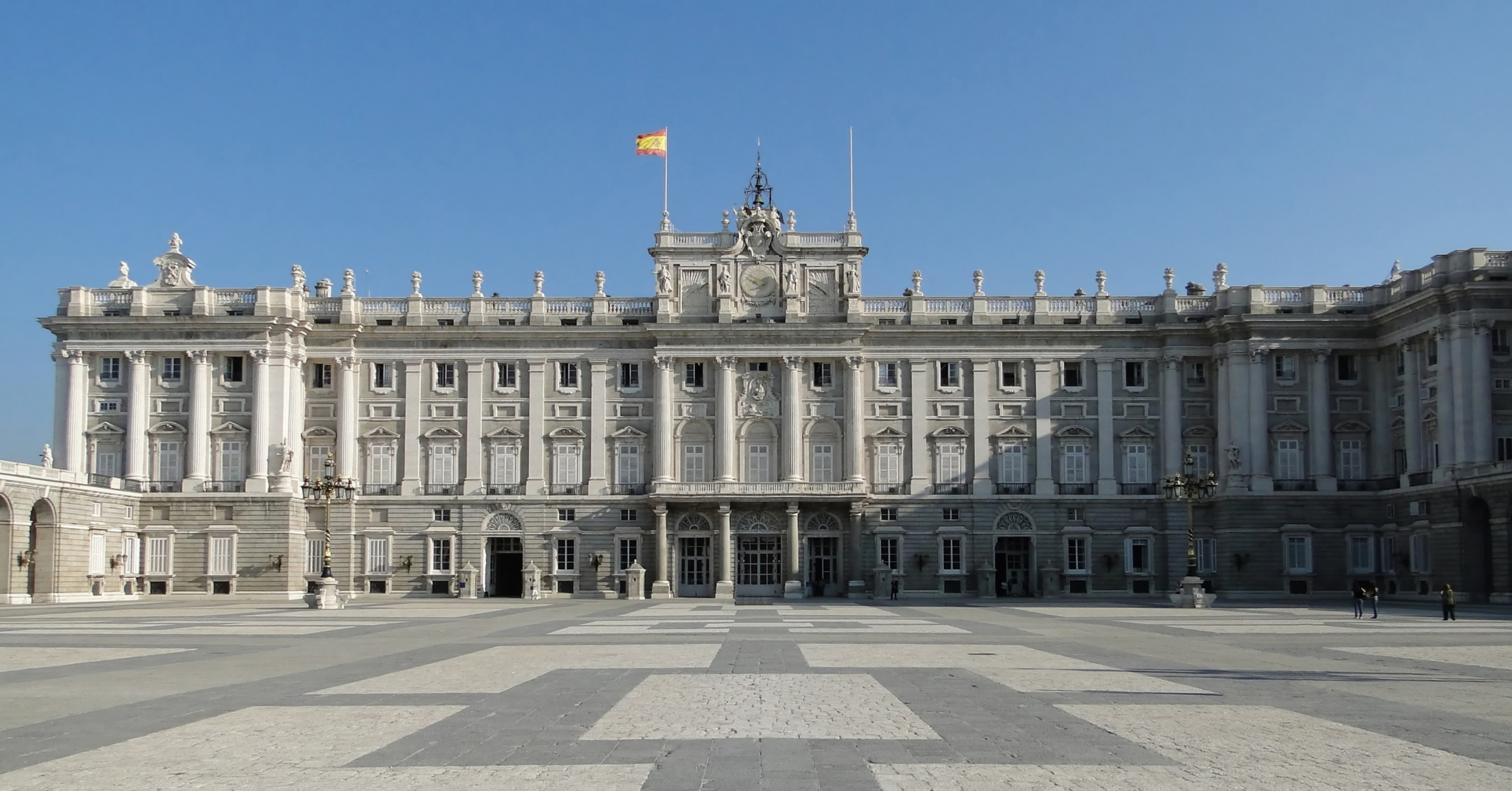
Royal Palace of Madrid (1738–1892)

Spanish Baroque is a strand of Baroque architecture that evolved in Spain, its provinces, and former colonies.

== History ==
The development of the style passed through three phases. Between 1680 and 1720, the Churriguera popularized Guarini's blend of Solomonic columns and Composite order, known as the "supreme order". Between 1720 and 1760, the Churrigueresque column, or estipite, in the shape of an inverted cone or obelisk, was established as a central element of ornamental decoration. The years from 1760 to 1780 saw a gradual shift of interest away from twisted movement and excessive ornamentation toward a neoclassical balance and sobriety.

In contrast to the art of Northern Europe, the Spanish art of the period appealed to the emotions rather than seeking to please the intellect. The Churriguera family, which specialized in designing altars and retables, revolted against the sobriety of the Herreresque classicism and promoted an intricate, exaggerated, almost capricious style of surface decoration known as the Churrigueresque. Within half a century, they transformed Salamanca into an exemplary Churrigueresque city.

== In Spain ==
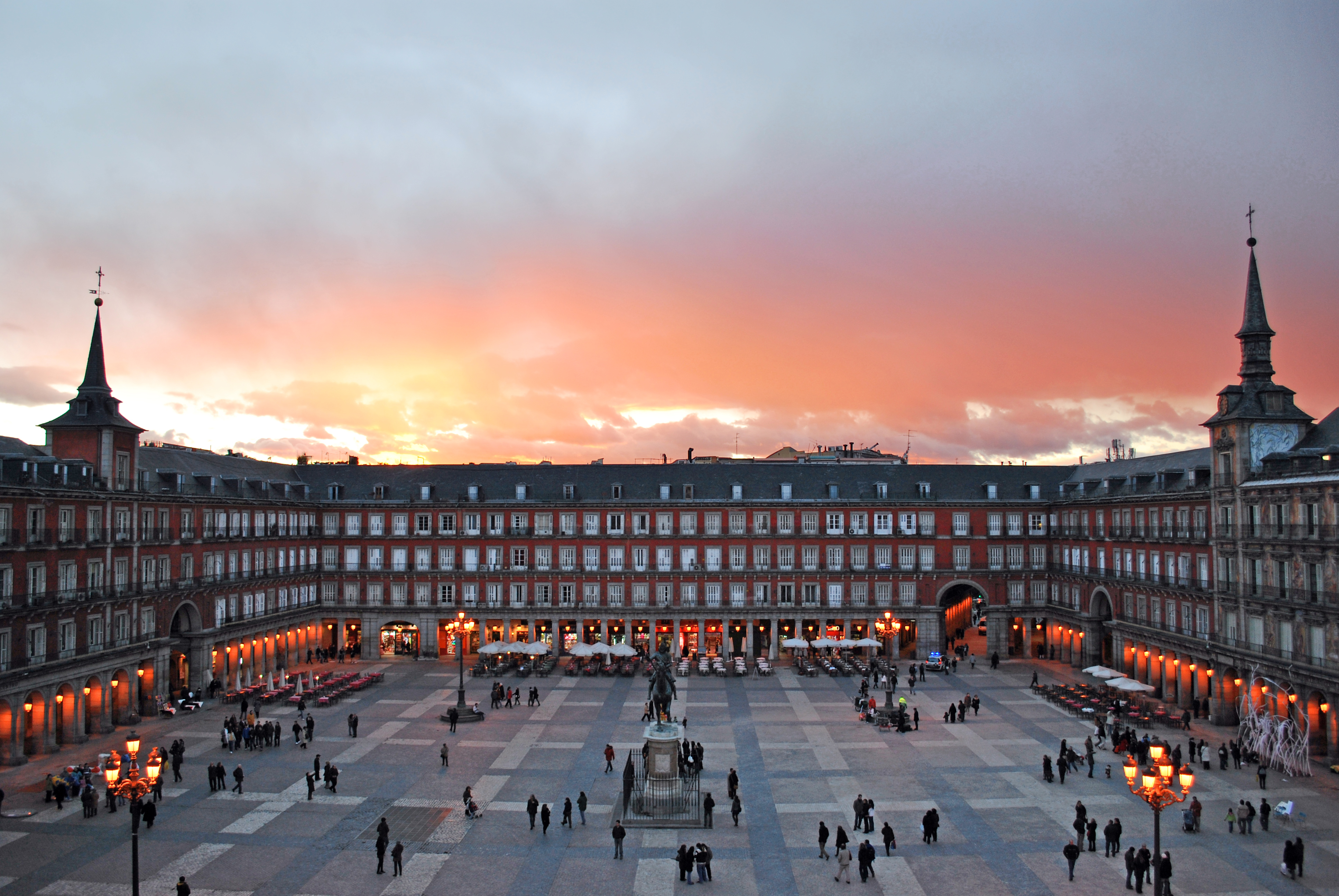
Plaza Mayor in Madrid

As Italian Baroque influences penetrated across the Pyrenees, they gradually superseded in popularity the restrained classicizing approach of Juan de Herrera, which had been in vogue since the late sixteenth century. As early as 1667, the façades of Granada Cathedral (by Alonso Cano) and Jaén Cathedral (by Eufrasio López de Rojas) suggest the artists' fluency in interpreting traditional motifs of Spanish cathedral architecture in the Baroque aesthetic idiom.

In Madrid, a vernacular Baroque with its roots in Herrerian and in traditional brick construction was developed in the Plaza Mayor and in the Royal Buen Retiro Palace, which was destroyed during the French invasion by Napoleon's troops. Its gardens still remain as Parque del Buen Retiro. This sober brick Baroque of the 17th century is still well represented in the streets of the capital in palaces and squares.

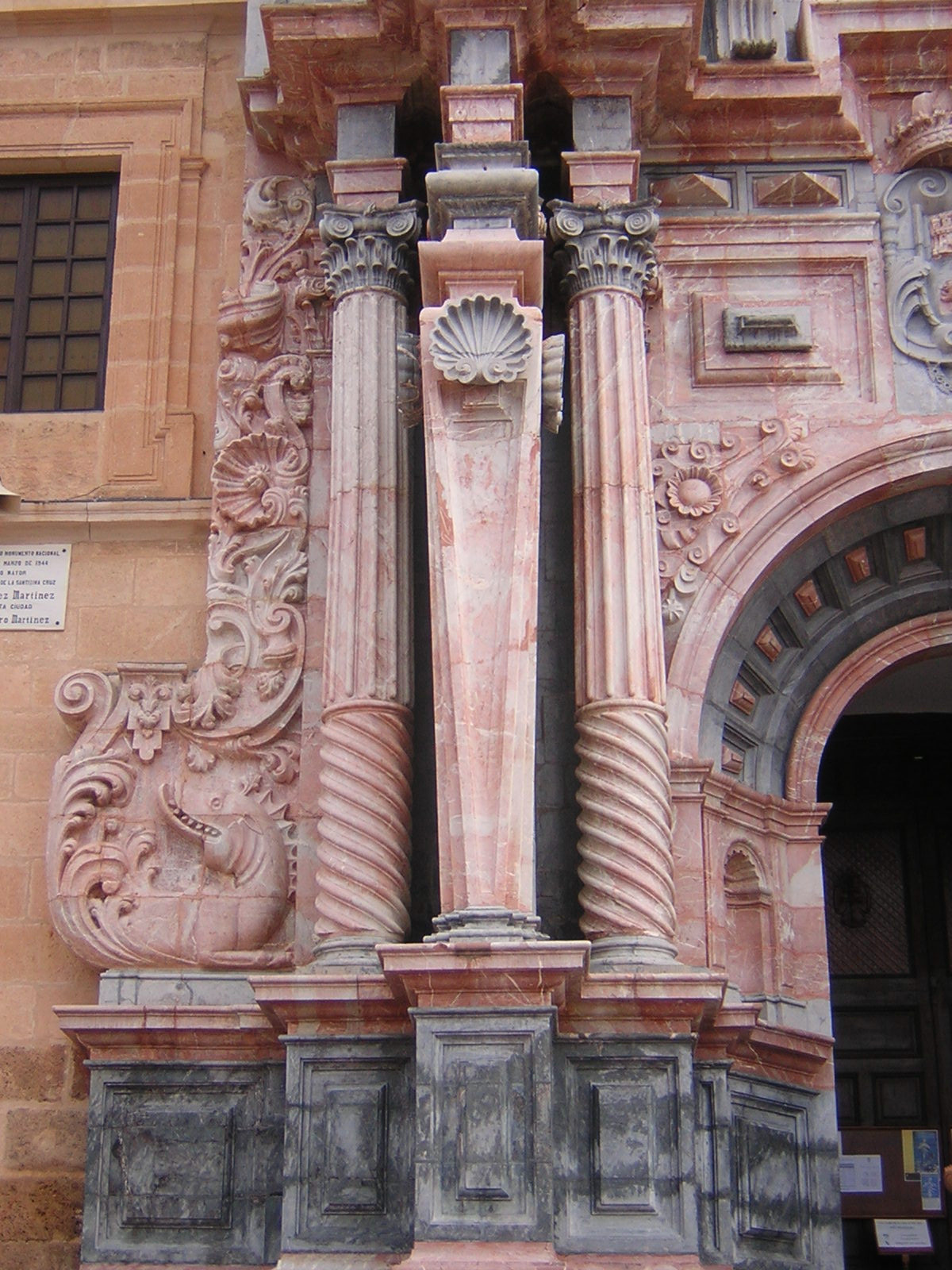
Estipite in the Basilica of Vera Cruz in Caravaca de la Cruz

Three of the most eye-catching creations of Spanish Baroque are the energetic façades of the University of Valladolid (Diego Tome and Fray Pedro de la Visitación, 1719), the western façade (or Fachada del Obradoiro) of the Cathedral of Santiago de Compostela (Fernando de Casas y Novoa, 1750), and the Hospicio de San Fernando in Madrid (Pedro de Ribera, 1722), whose curvilinear extravagance seems to herald Antonio Gaudí and Modernisme. In this case as in many others, the design involves a play of tectonic and decorative elements with little relation to structure and function. The focus of the florid ornamentation is an elaborately sculptured surround to a main doorway. If we remove the intricate maze of broken pediments, undulating cornices, stucco shells, inverted tapers and garlands from the rather plain wall it is set against, the building's form would not be affected in the slightest. However, Churrigueresque Baroque offered some of the most impressive combinations of space and light with buildings like Granada Charterhouse (sacristy by Francisco Hurtado Izquierdo), considered to be the apotheosis of Churrigueresque styles applied to interior spaces, or El Transparente of the Cathedral of Toledo by Narciso Tomé, where sculpture and architecture are integrated to achieve notable light dramatic effects.

The Royal Palace of Madrid and the interventions of Paseo del Prado (Salón del Prado and Alcalá Doorgate) in the same city, deserve special mention. They were constructed in a sober Baroque international style, often mistaken for neoclassical, by the kings Philip V and Charles III. The Royal Palace of La Granja de San Ildefonso in Segovia and the Royal Palace of Aranjuez in Aranjuez are good examples of Baroque integration of architecture and gardening, with noticeable French influence (La Granja is known as the "Spanish Versailles"), but with local spatial conceptions which in some ways display the heritage of the Moorish occupation.

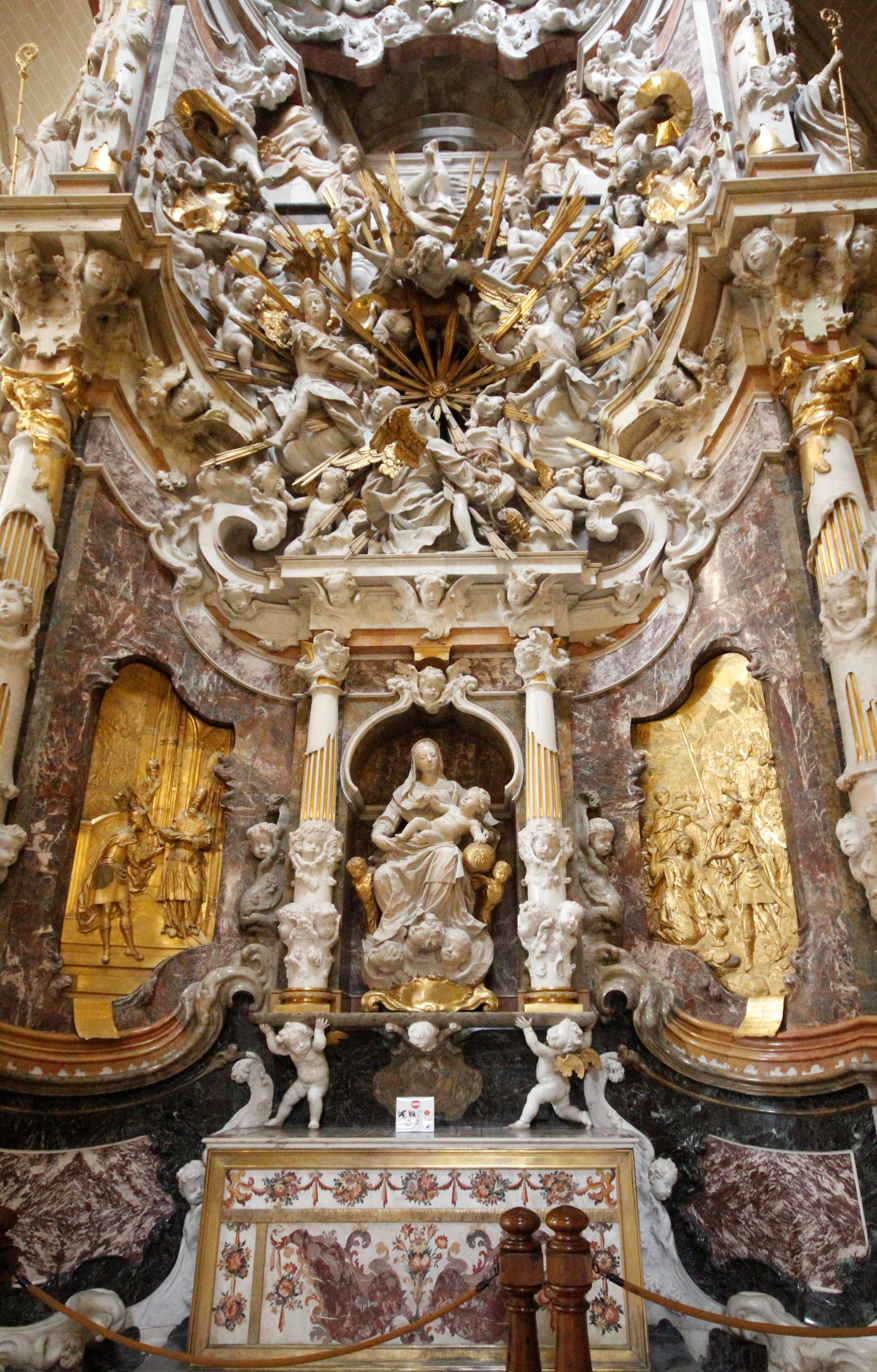
El Transparente of the Cathedral of Toledo

In the richest imperial province of 17th-century Spain, Flanders, florid decorative detailing was more tightly knit to the structure, thus precluding concerns of superfluity. A remarkable convergence of Spanish, French and Dutch Baroque aesthetics may be seen in the Abbey of Averbode (1667). Another characteristic example is the Church of St. Michel at Louvain (1650–70), with its exuberant two-storey façade, clusters of half-columns, and the complex aggregation of French-inspired sculptural detailing.

Six decades later, the architect Jaime Bort y Meliá was the first to introduce Rococo to Spain (Cathedral of Murcia, west façade, 1733). The greatest practitioner of the Spanish Rococo style was a native master, Ventura Rodríguez, responsible for the dazzling interior of the Basilica of Our Lady of the Pillar in Zaragoza (1750).

== In Spanish America ==
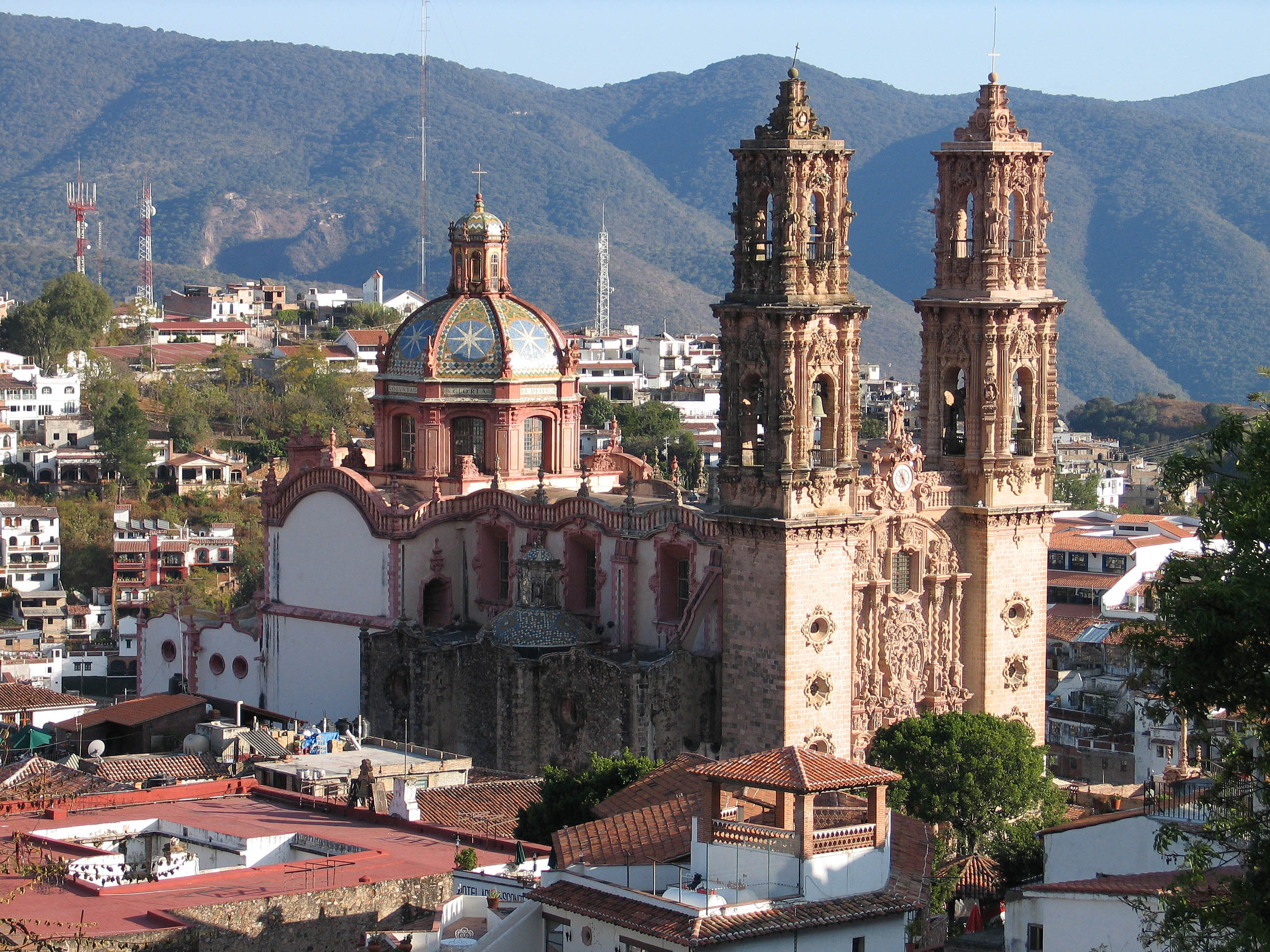
The façade of the Church of Santa Prisca de Taxco (1751–58) bristles with Mexican Churrigueresque ornamentation.

In the north, the richest province of 18th-century New Spain – Mexico – produced some fantastically extravagant and visually frenetic architecture known as Mexican Churrigueresque. This ultra-Baroque approach culminates in the works of Lorenzo Rodriguez, whose masterpiece is the Sagrario Metropolitano in Mexico City (1718–69). Other fine examples of the style may be found in the remote silver-mining towns. For instance, the Sanctuary at Ocotlán (begun in 1745) is a top-notch Baroque cathedral surfaced in bright red tiles, which contrast delightfully with a plethora of compressed ornament lavishly applied to the main entrance and the slender flanking towers (exterior, interior). The Church of Santa Prisca de Taxco (1758), and San Martín at San Luis Potosí (1764) are other excellent examples of Churrigueresque in Mexico.

The true capital of Mexican Baroque is Puebla, where a ready supply of hand-painted figurines (talavera) and vernacular gray stone led to its evolving further into a personalised and highly localised art form with a pronounced Indian flavour. There are about sixty churches whose façades and domes display glazed tiles of many colours, often arranged in Arabic designs. Their interiors are densely saturated with elaborate gold leaf ornamentation. In the 18th century, local artisans developed a distinctive brand of white stucco decoration, named "alfeñique" after a Pueblan candy made from egg whites and sugar.

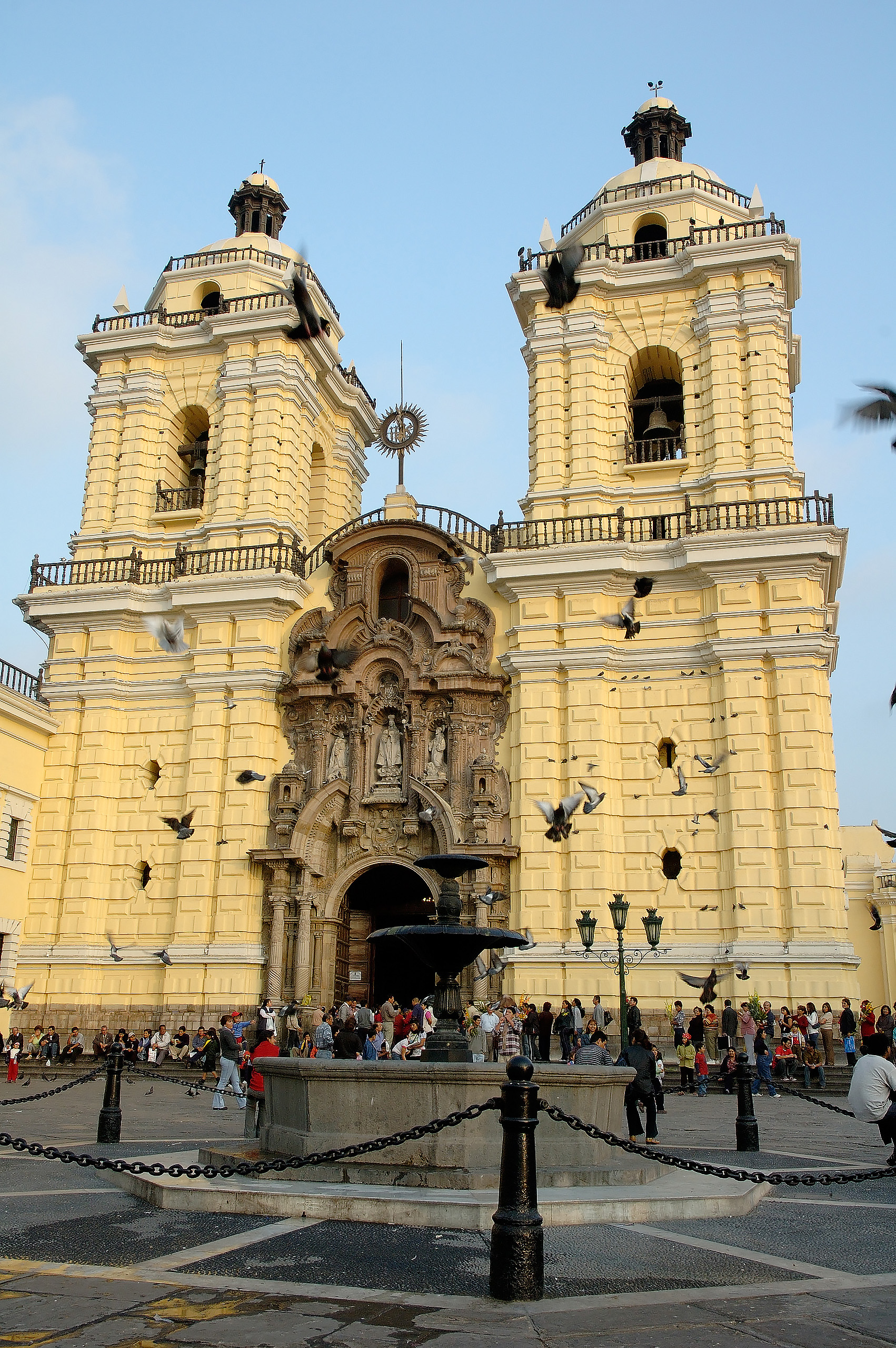
Monastery of San Francisco de Asís, Lima, 1673

The combination of the Native American and Moorish decorative influences with an extremely expressive interpretation of the Churrigueresque idiom may account for the full-bodied and varied character of the Baroque in the American colonies of Spain. Even more than its Spanish counterpart, American Baroque developed as a style of stucco decoration. Twin-towered façades of many American cathedrals of the seventeenth century had medieval roots and the full-fledged Baroque did not appear until 1664, when the Jesuit shrine on Plaza des Armas in Cusco was built. Even then, the new style hardly affected the structure of churches.

The Peruvian Baroque was particularly lush, as evidenced by the monastery of San Francisco in Lima (1673), which has a dark intricate façade sandwiched between the yellow twin towers. Followed the model of Il Gesù (also the case of the Jesuit Basilica and Convent of San Pedro, Lima, provincial "mestizo" (crossbred) styles emerged in Arequipa, Potosí and La Paz. In the eighteenth century, the architects of the region turned for inspiration to the Mudéjar art of medieval Spain. The late Baroque type of Peruvian façade first appears in the Church of Our Lady of Mercy, Lima (1697–1704). Similarly, the Iglesia de La Compañia, Quito (1722–65) suggests a carved altarpiece with its richly sculpted façade and a surfeit of Solomonic column.

== Gallery ==
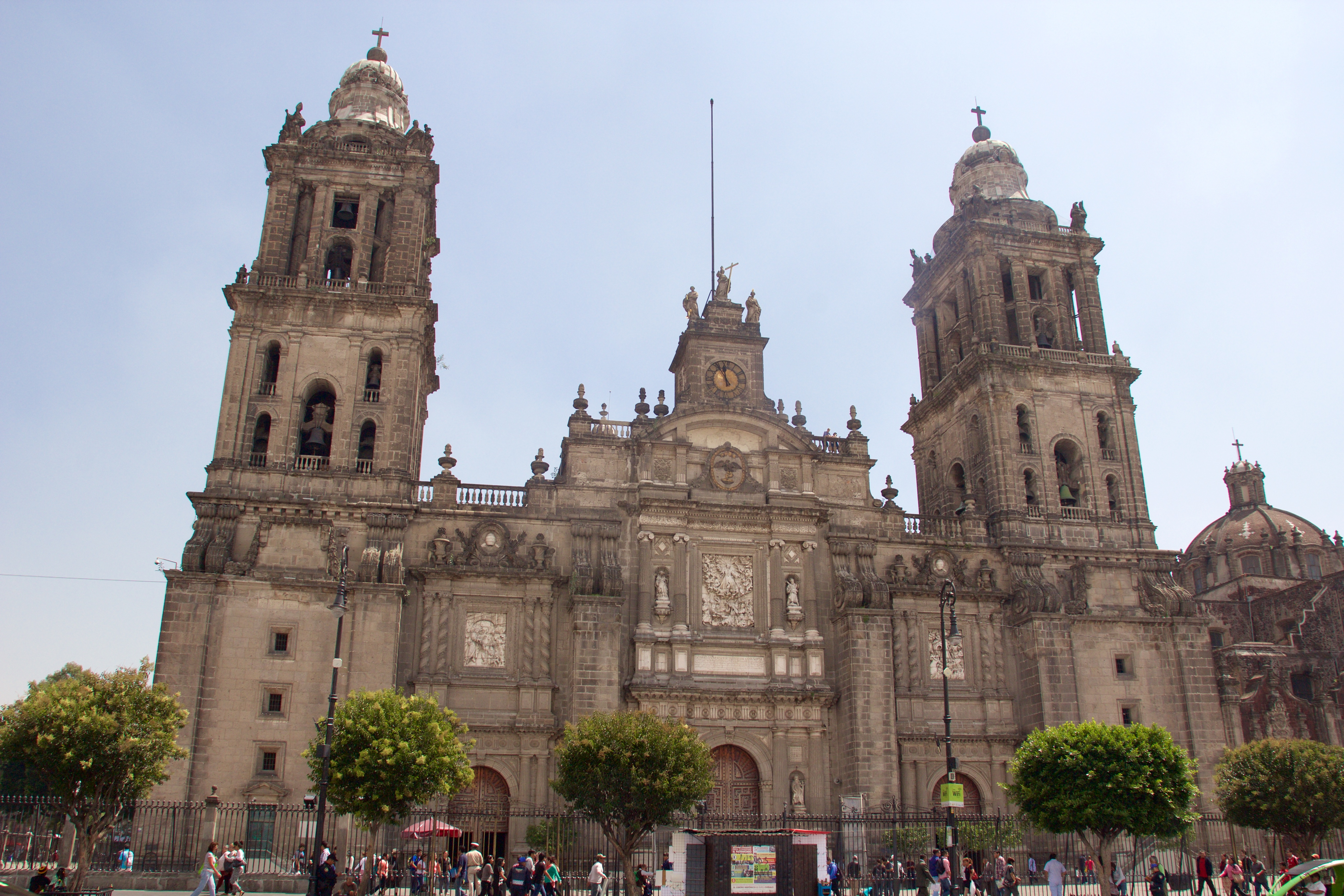
The Mexico City Metropolitan Cathedral (1573–1813)

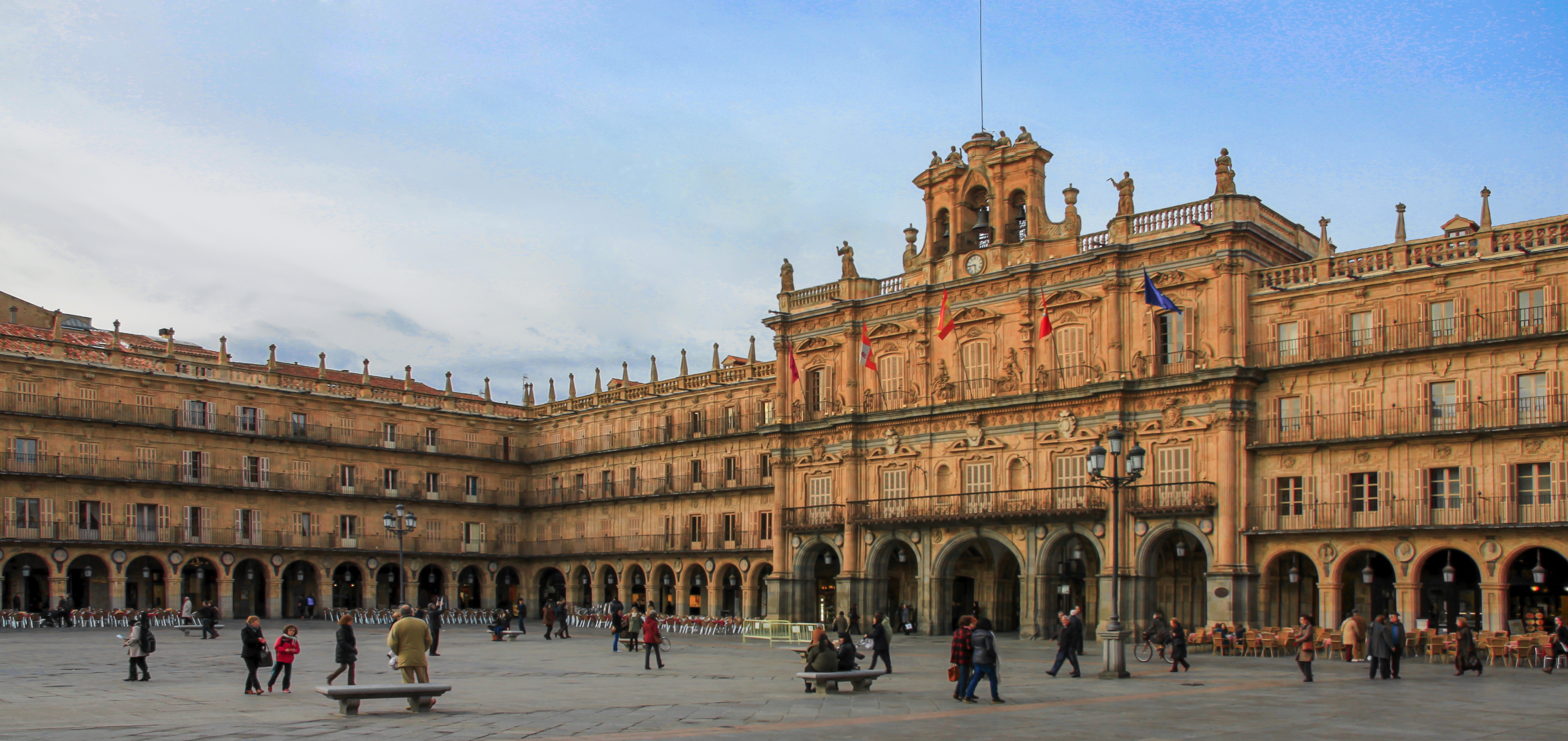
Plaza Mayor, Salamanca (1729–1755), Alberto and Manuel de Lara Churriguera. Andrés Garcia de Quiñones designed the city Hall.

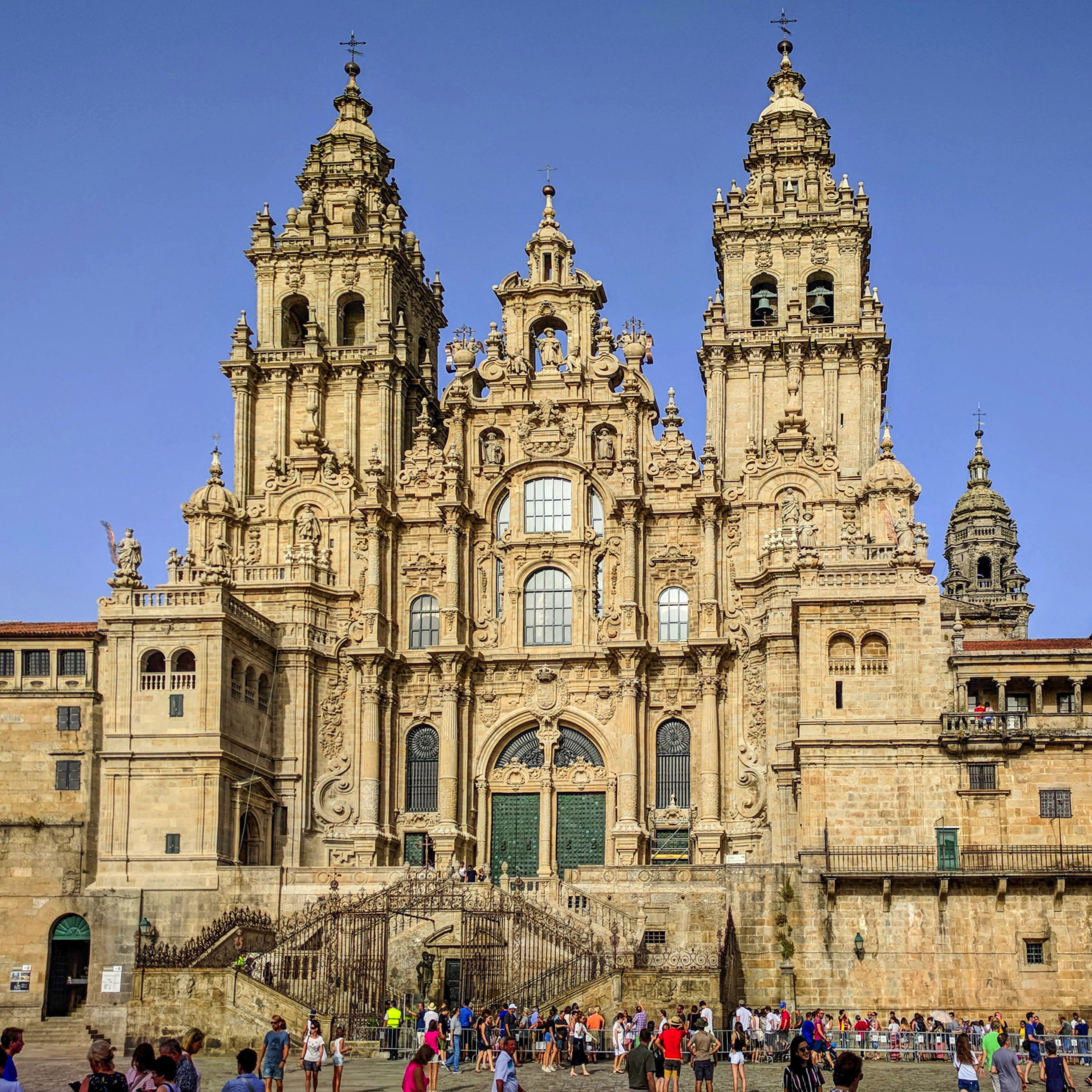
Obradoiro façade of the Cathedral of Santiago de Compostela

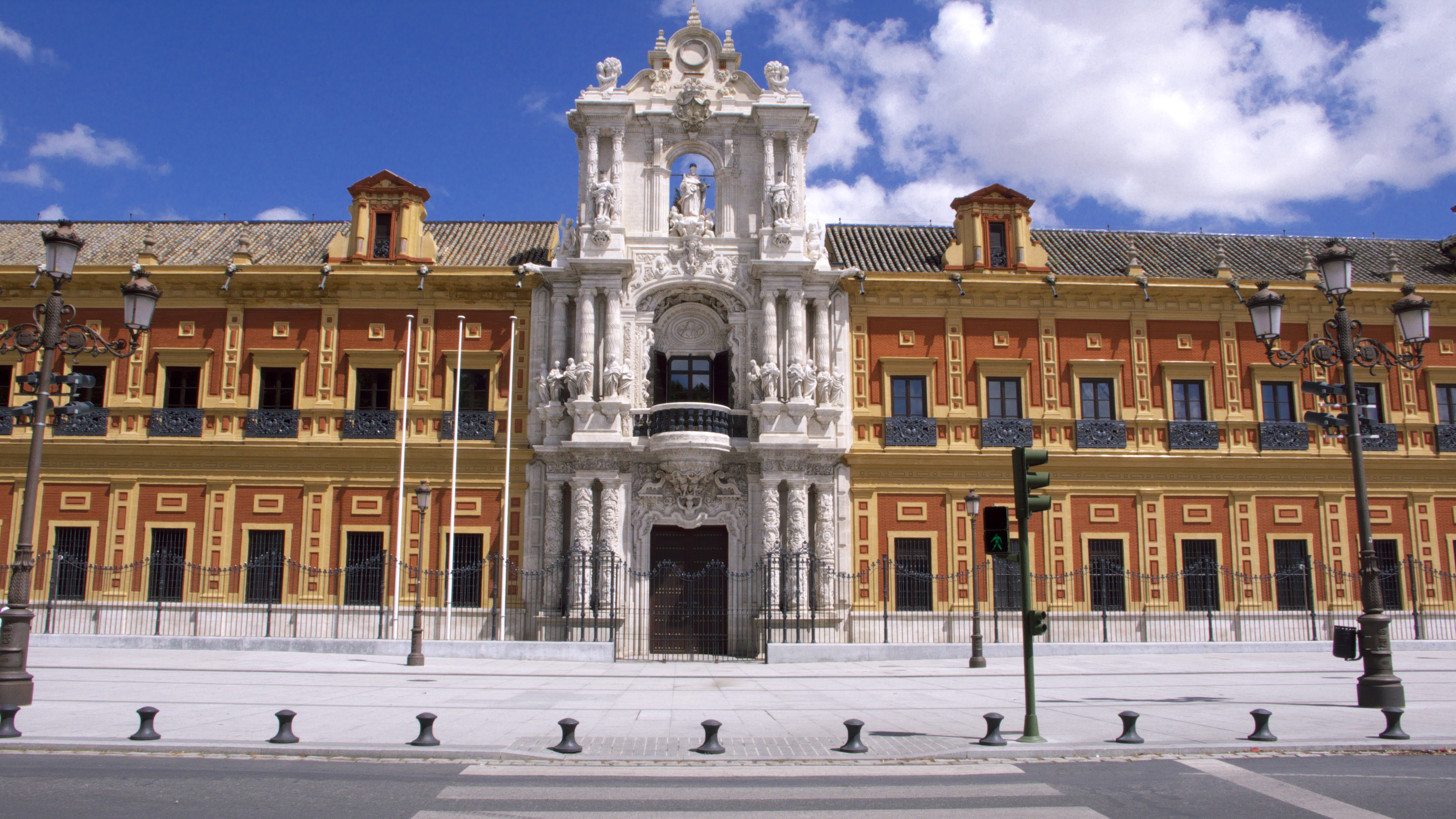
Palace of San Telmo (1681–1796), by Leonardo de Figueroa

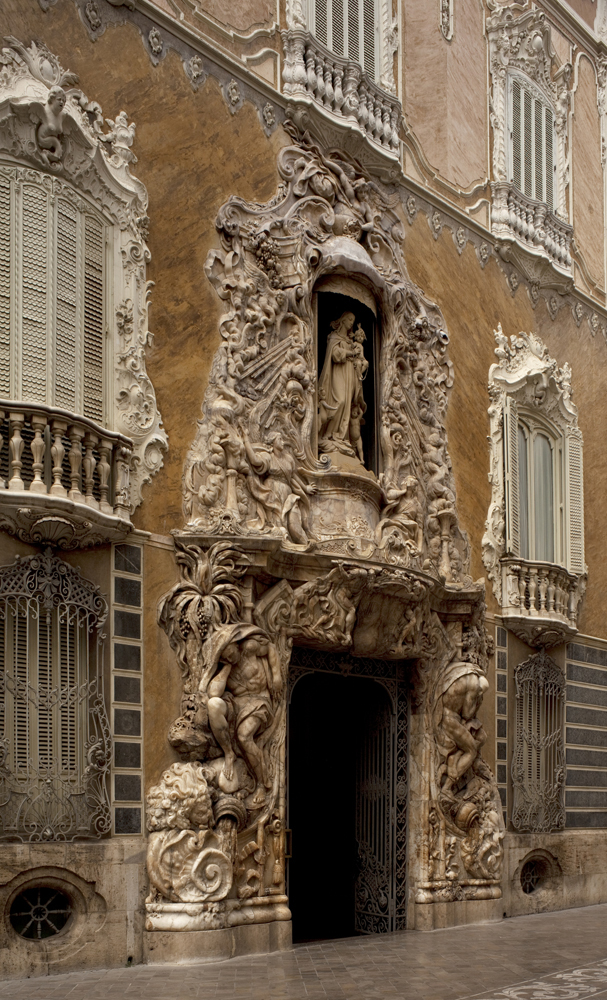
Palace of the Marqués de Dos Aguas (1740) in Valencia. Ignacio Vergara, sculptor

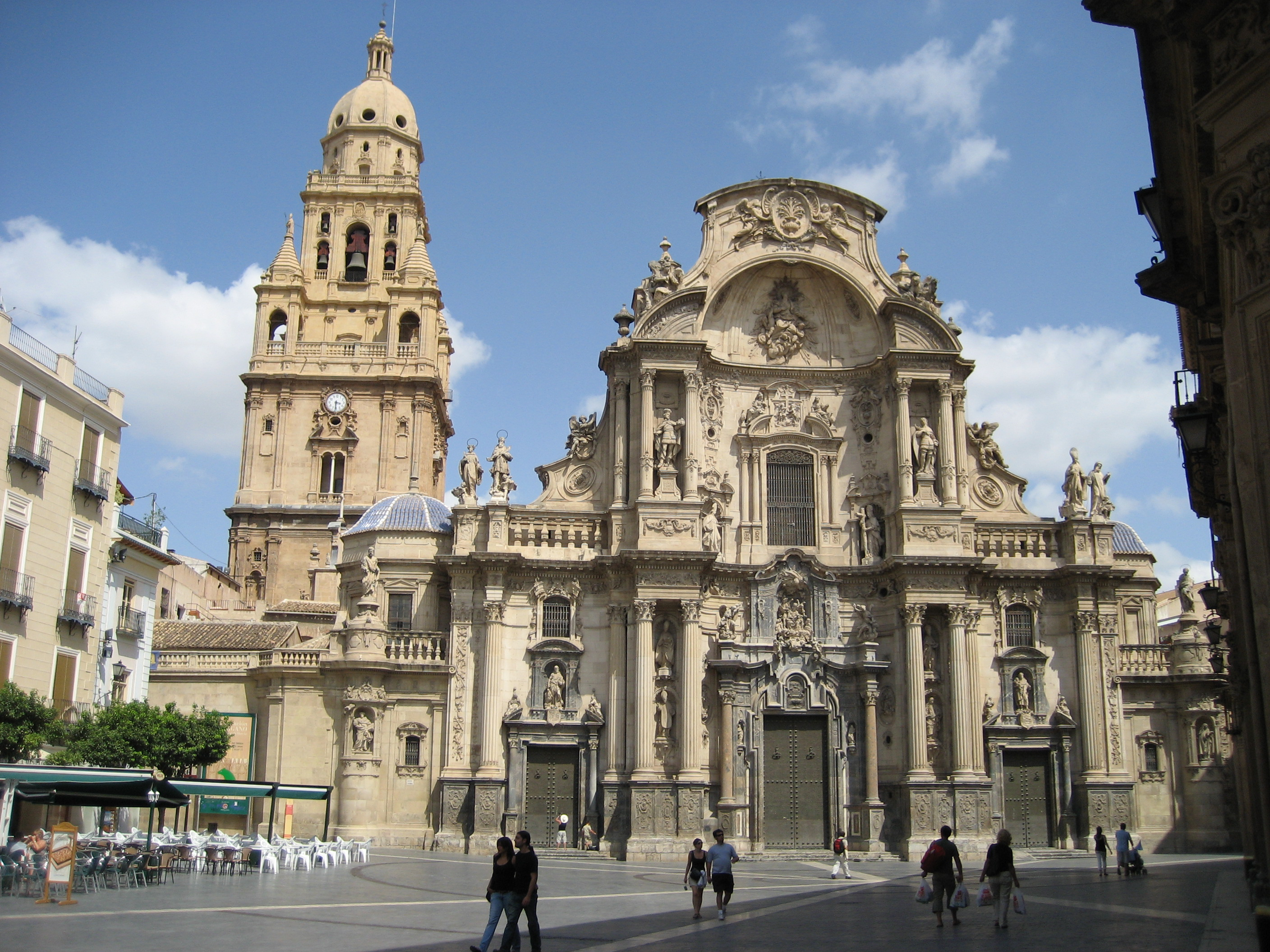
Cathedral Church of Saint Mary in Murcia

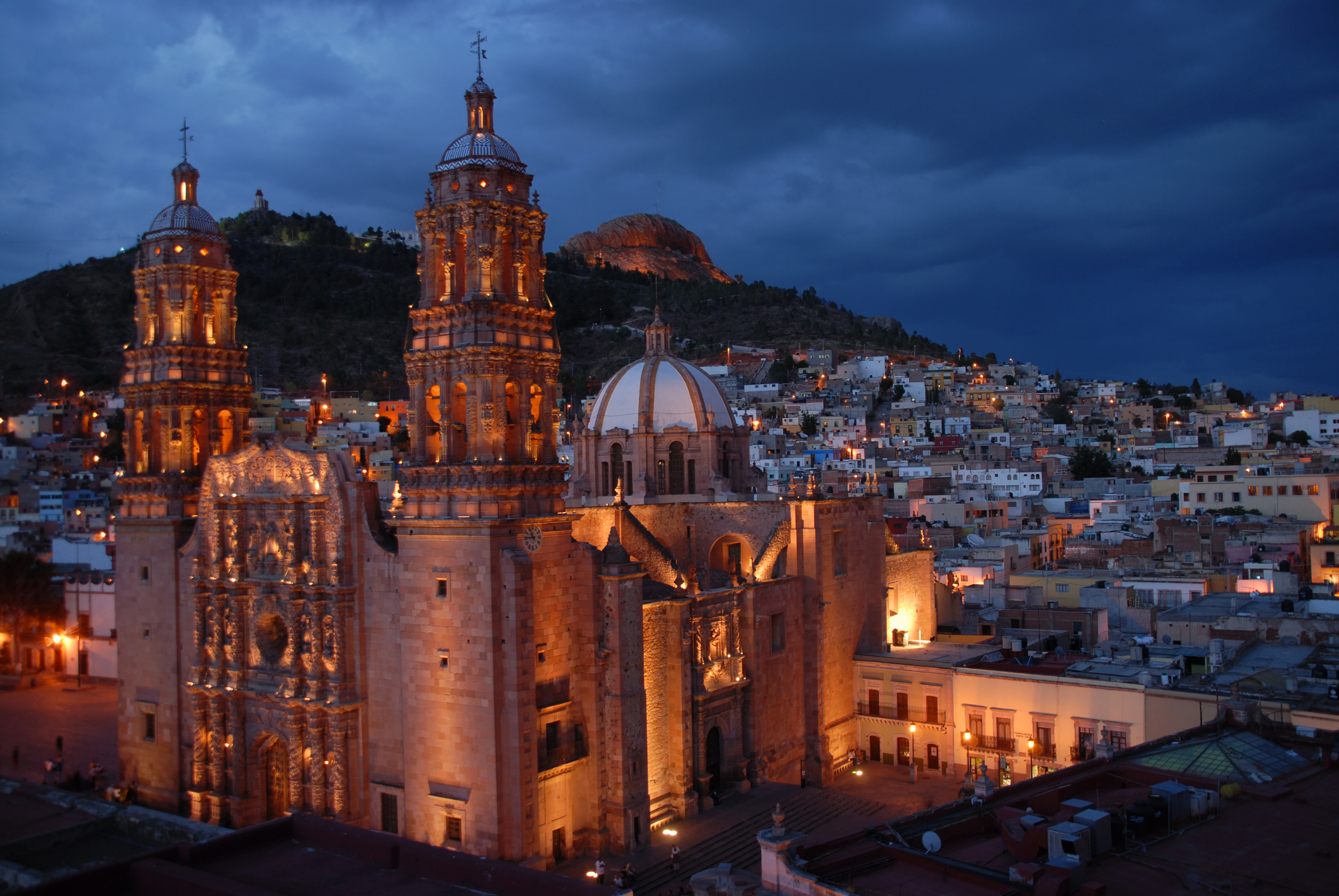
Zacatecas Cathedral (1752) Mexico

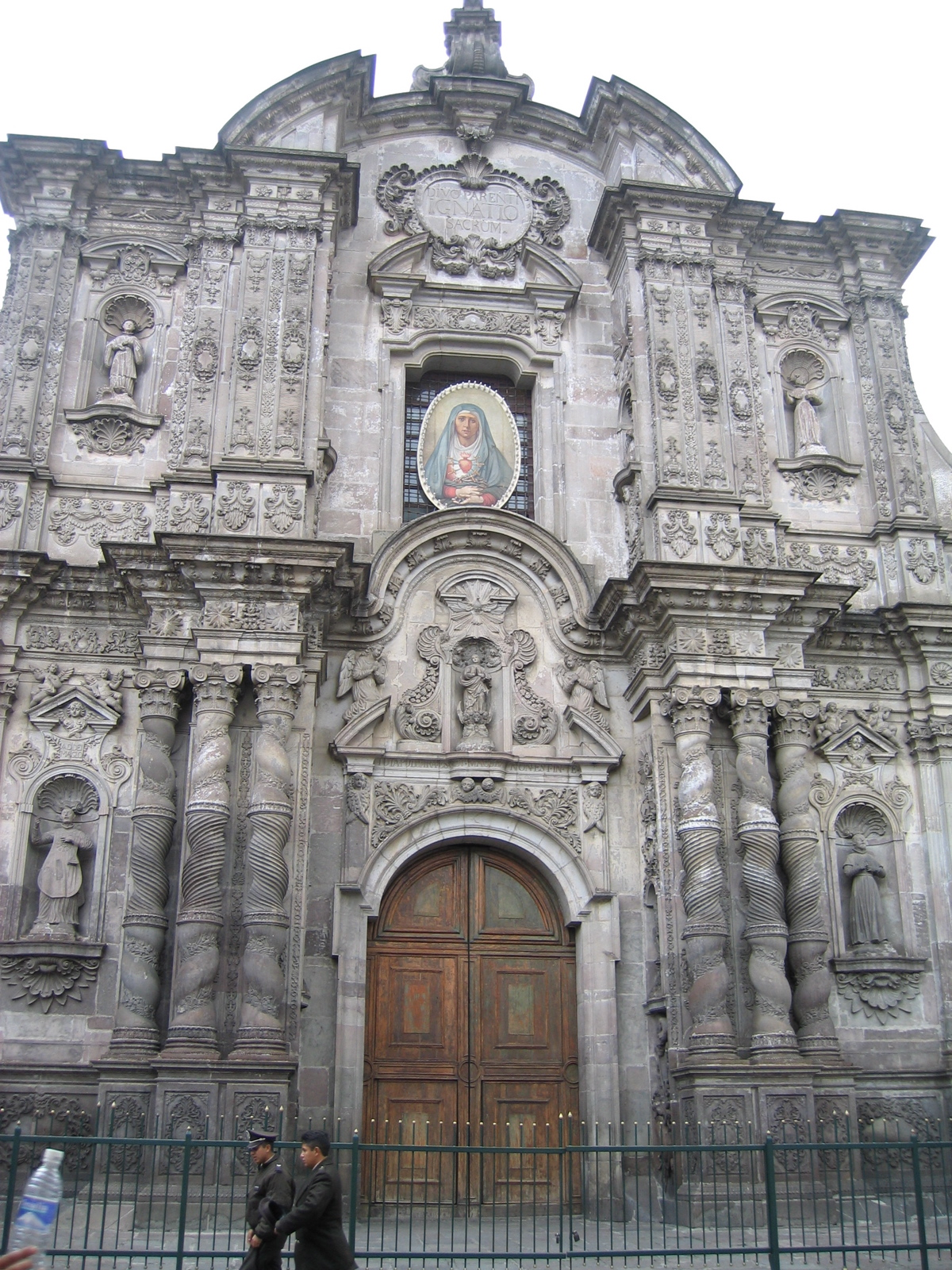
Church of La Compañía (1605) Quito, Ecuador

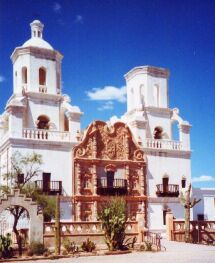
San Xavier del Bac (1692) Tucson, Arizona

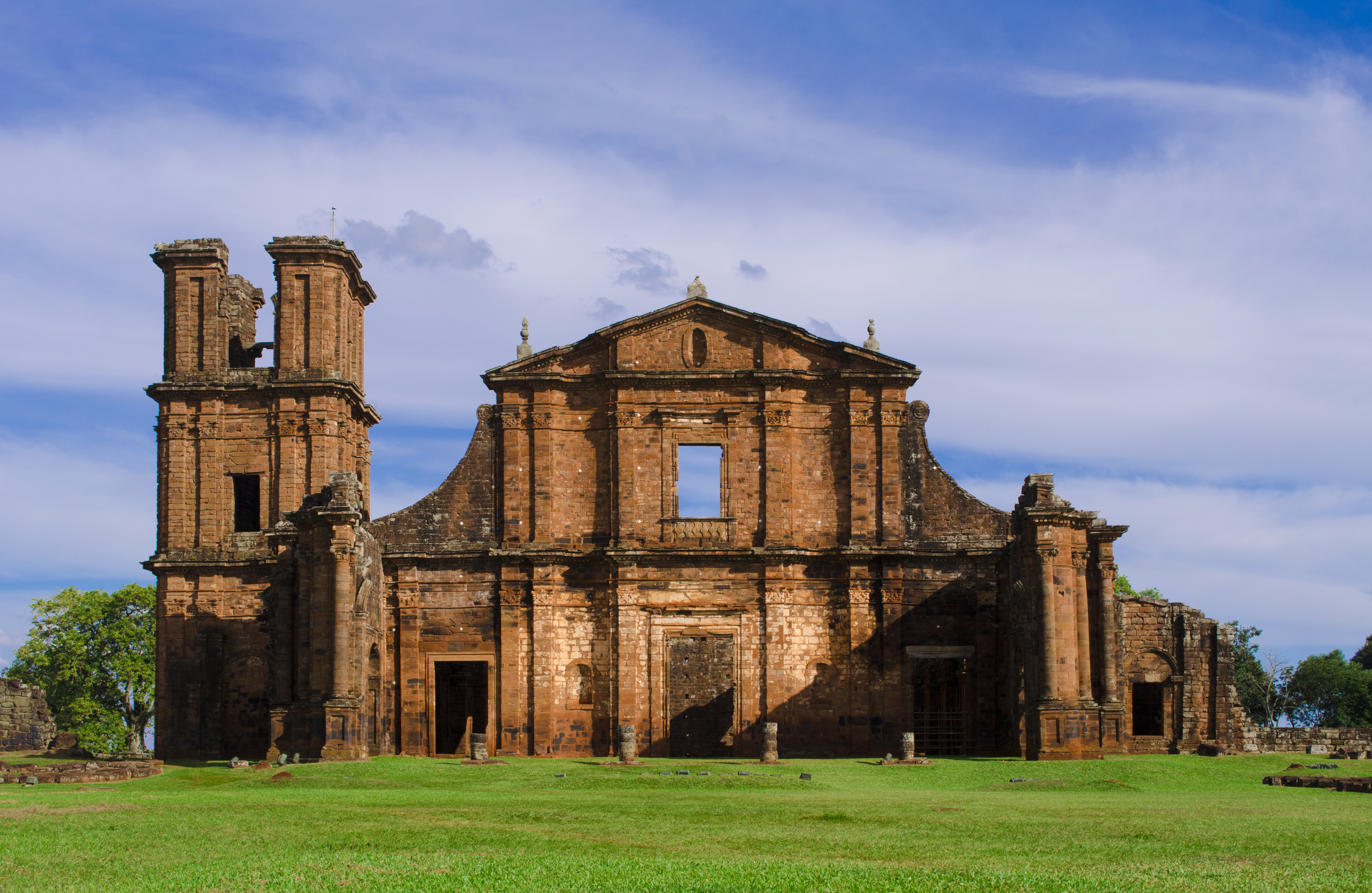
São Miguel das Missões (1735–45) Rio Grande do Sul, Brazil

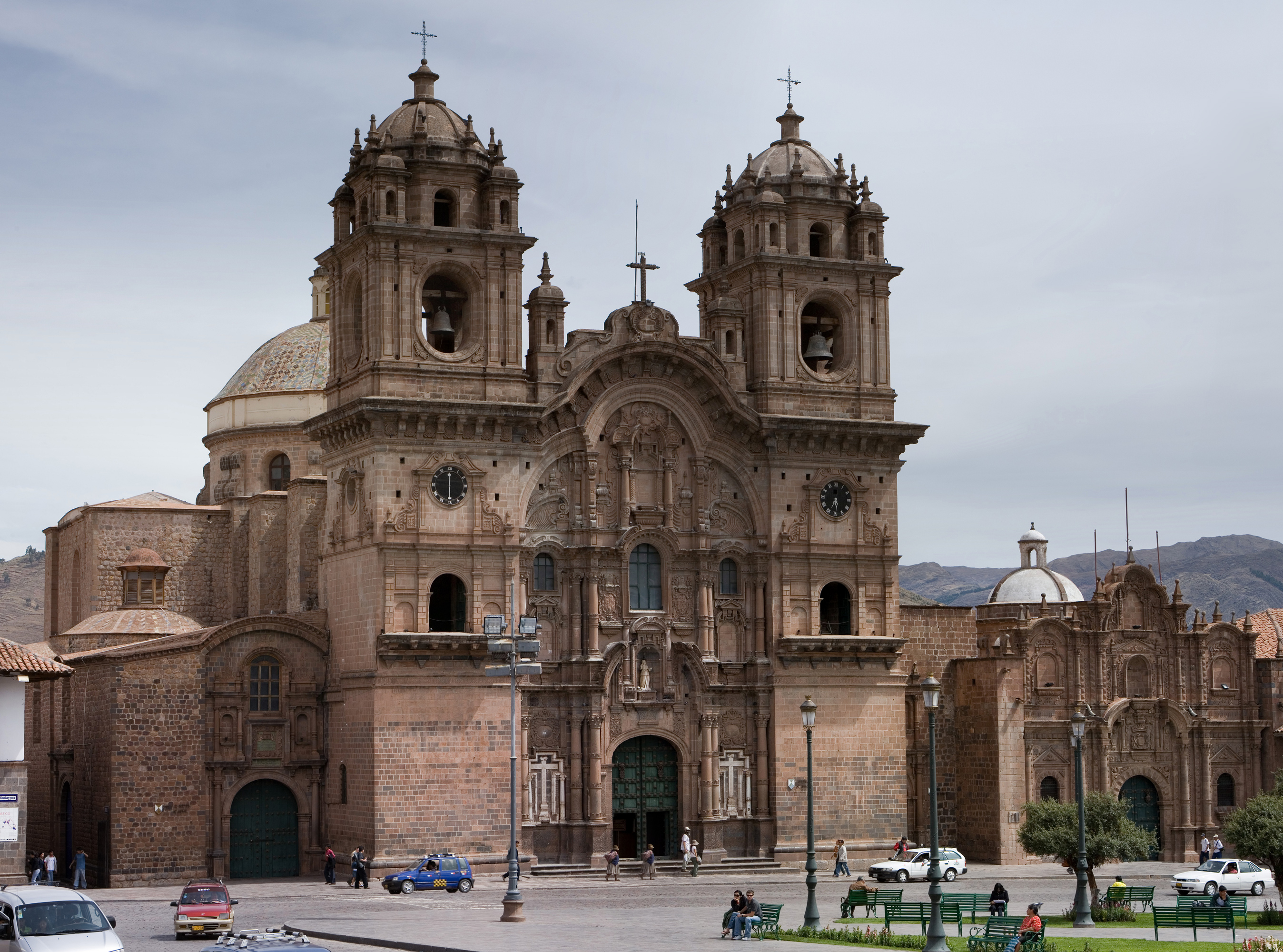
Church of La Compañia (1571) Cusco, Peru

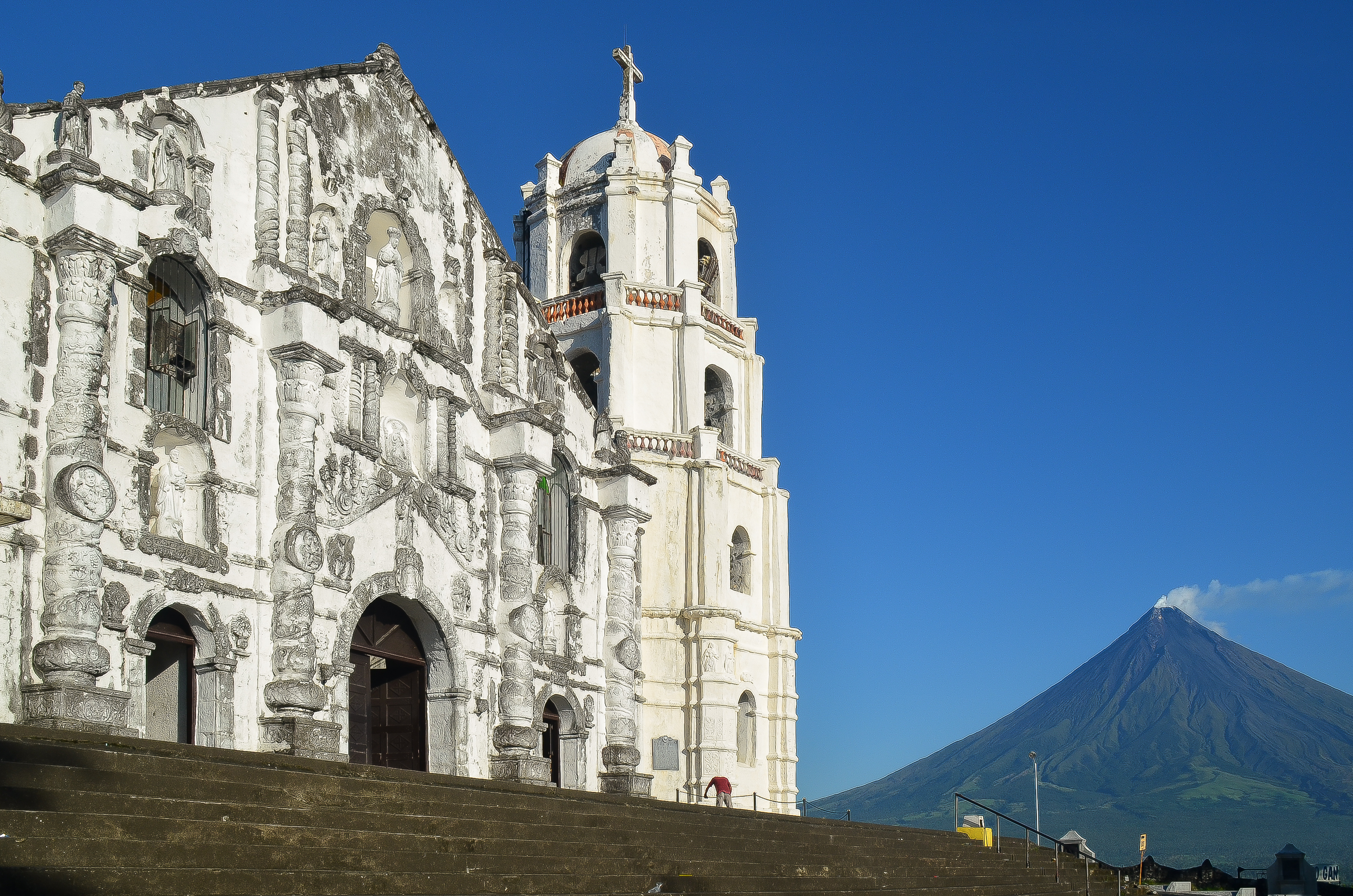
Our Lady of the Gate Parish Church (1773) Daraga, Philippines. Part of the so called Earthquake Baroque

== See also ==
- Spanish Golden Age
- Spanish Colonial architecture
- New Spanish Baroque
- Spanish Baroque ephemeral architecture
- Andean Baroque
- Earthquake Baroque
