= Transparente (Cathedral of Toledo) =

Baroque altarpiece in the Cathedral of Toledo

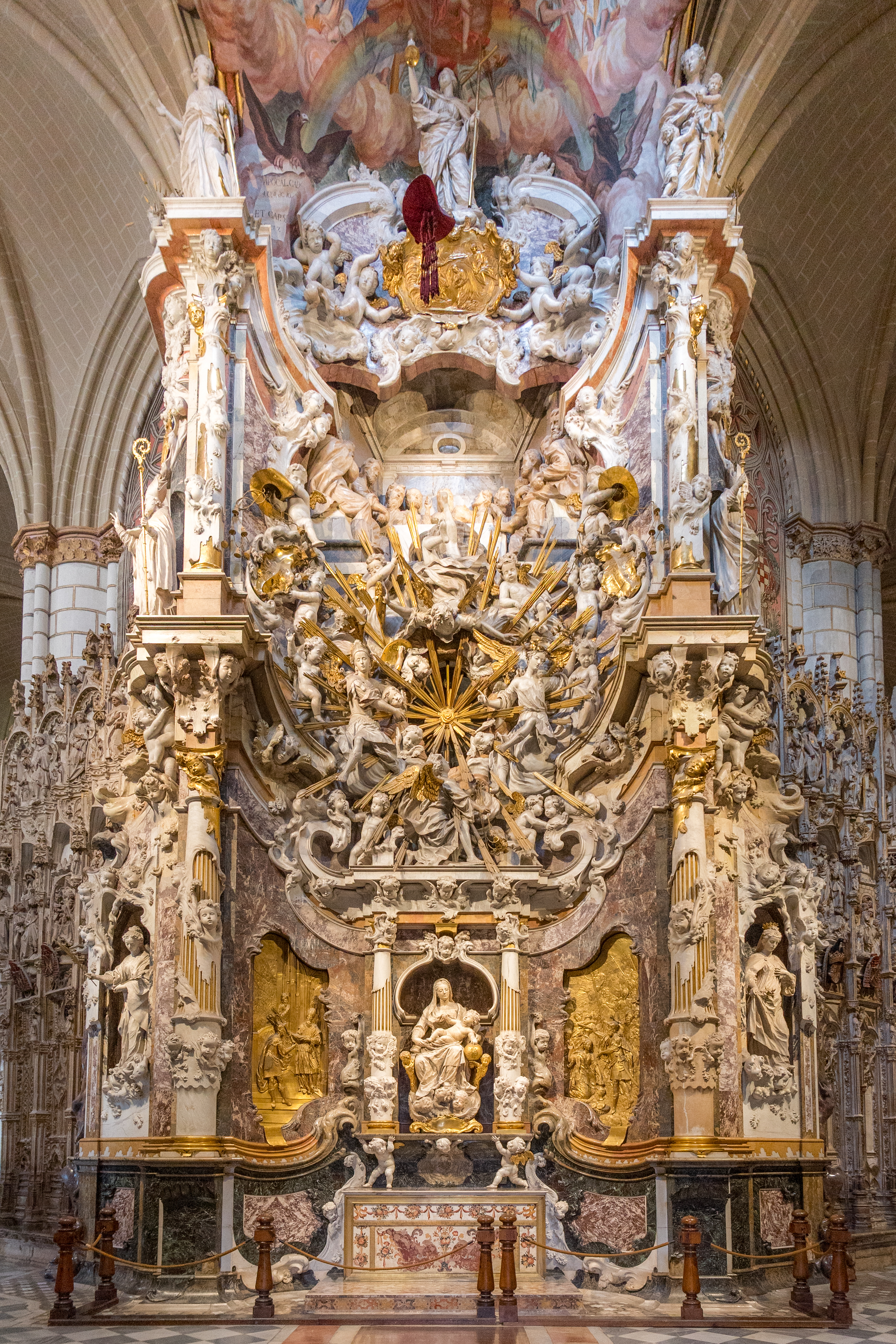
- The Transparente in 2025
- Artist: Narciso Tomé
- Completion date: 1732
- Medium: Marble, jasper, bronze
- Movement: Baroque, Churrigueresque
- Subject: Madonna and Child
- Location: Cathedral of Saint Mary, Toledo

The Transparente (Spanish: Transparent) is a Baroque altarpiece located in the ambulatory of the Cathedral of Toledo, in Spain. Its name refers to the unique illumination provided by a large oculus opened high up into the thick wall across the ambulatory, and another hole cut into the back of the altarpiece itself to allow shafts of sunlight to strike the tabernacle. This lower hole also allows persons in the ambulatory to see through the altarpiece to the tabernacle, as if it were "transparent".

It was created between 1729-1732 by Narciso Tomé and his four sons (two architects, one painter, and one sculptor). The use of light and mixed materials (marble, bronze, paint, stucco) may reflect the influence of Bernini's Cathedra Petri in St Peter's Basilica, Rome.

Its execution was ordered by Diego de Astorga y Céspedes, Archbishop of Toledo. The Archbishop wished to mark the presence of the Holy Sacrament with a glorious monument. The monument cost 200,000 ducats and aroused great enthusiasm, even a celebratory poem wherein the monument was acclaimed 'the Eighth Wonder of the World'. Cardinal Astorga y Céspedes is buried at the feet of the Transparente.

According to American writer James Michener's book Iberia (1968), the Transparente was installed to allow light to pass from the ambulatory behind the high altar (or 'reredos' as he calls it), onto the tabernacle (the container for the Blessed Sacrament) which stayed in constant shadow because of the tall reredos.

After the two holes were cut, Tomé and his sons designed a way to visually connect them by sculpting a fantastic company of angels, saints, prophets, and cardinals. Abstract designs suggesting flowing robes and foliage hang over corners to mask the details of the architectural piercings. Along the edges of the skylight, they arranged an array of Biblical figures who seem to tumble into the cathedral. At the outer edge of the opening sits Christ on a bank of clouds, surrounded by angels. The back side of the altarpiece was converted into a tower of marble which reaches from the floor to the ceiling. Intricate groups of figures were assembled so that the opening to the tabernacle could be hidden yet permit light to pass through.

== Gallery ==
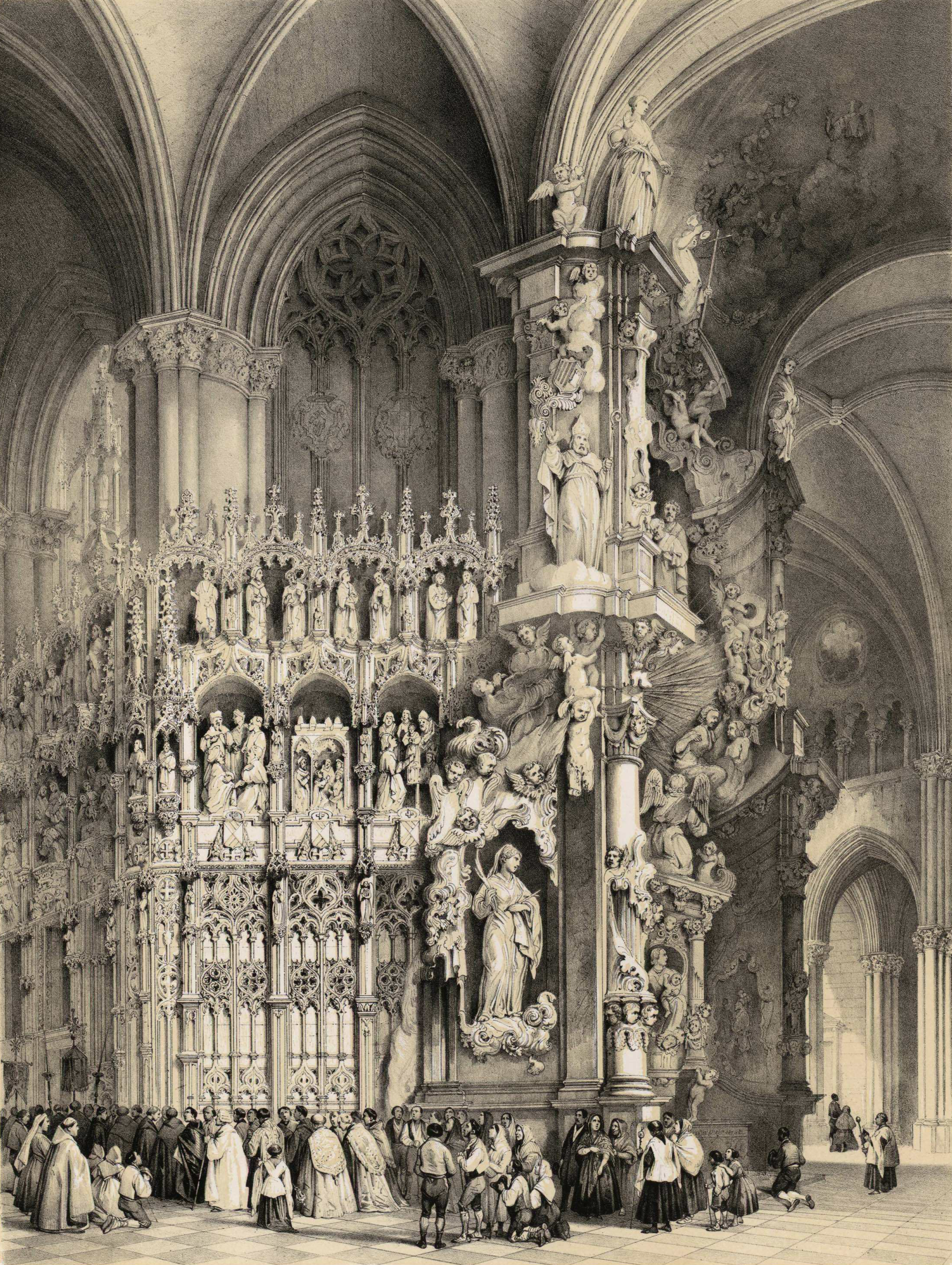
1842 engraving

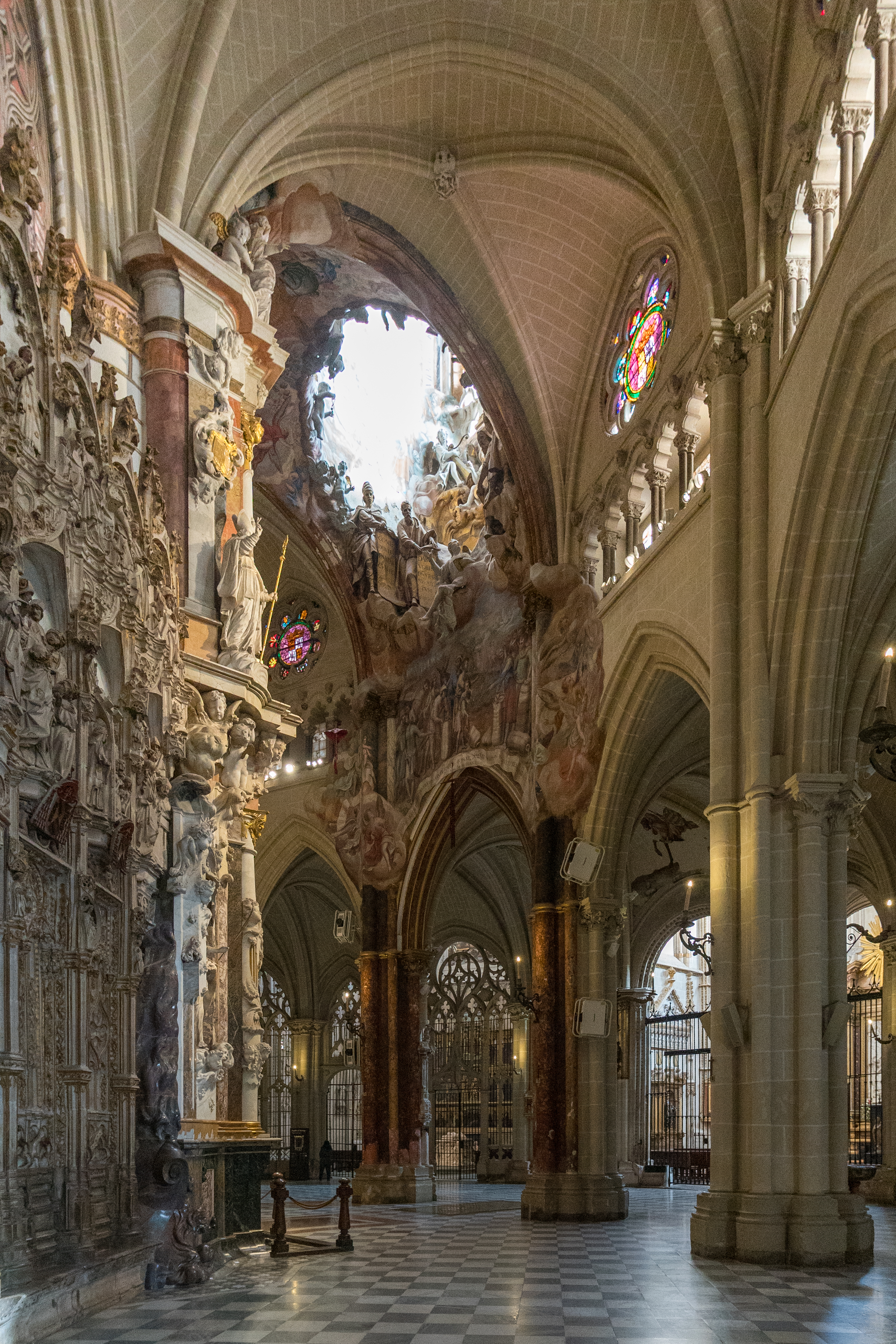
Ambulatory and side view

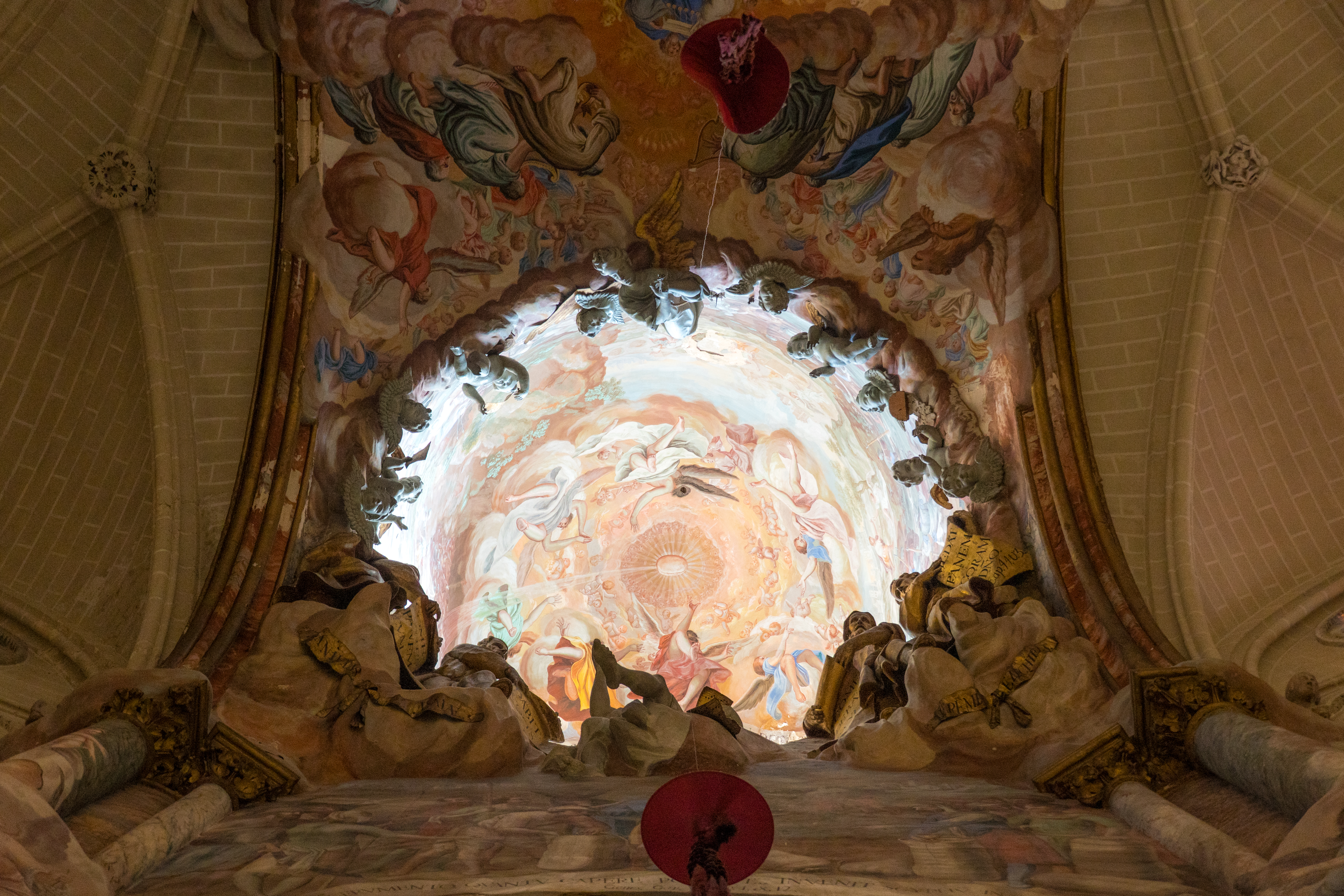
Oculus from below

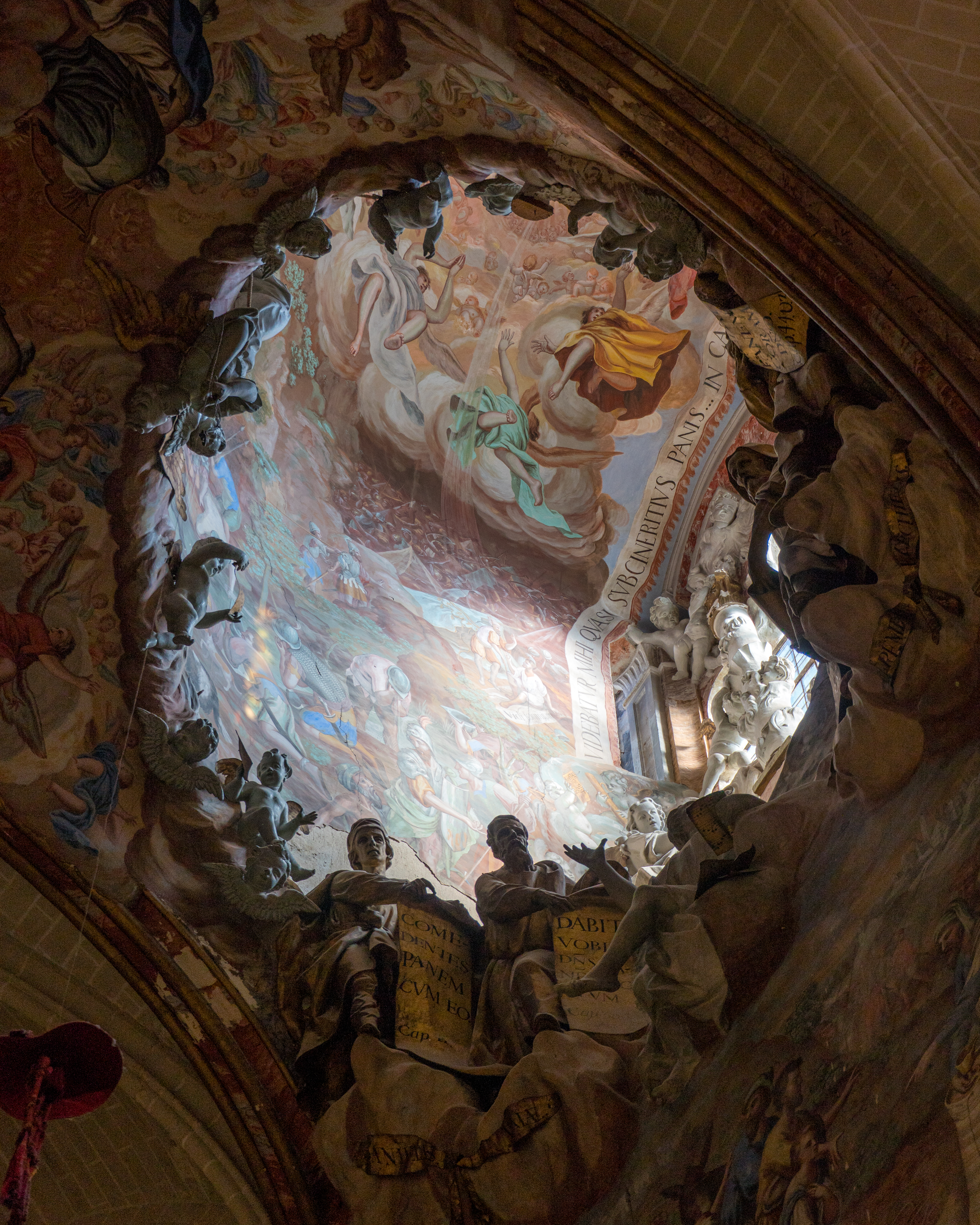
Oculus

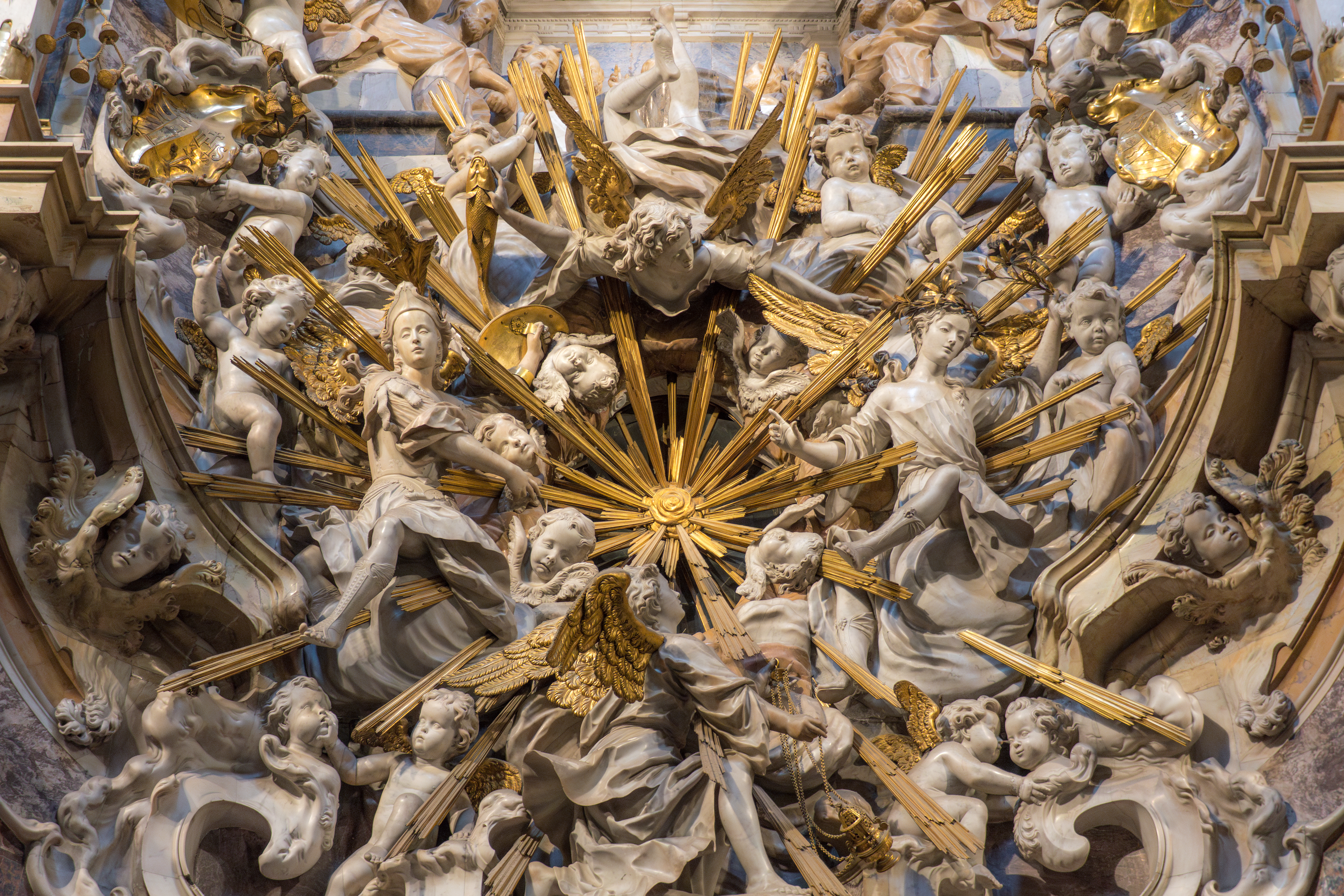
Detail

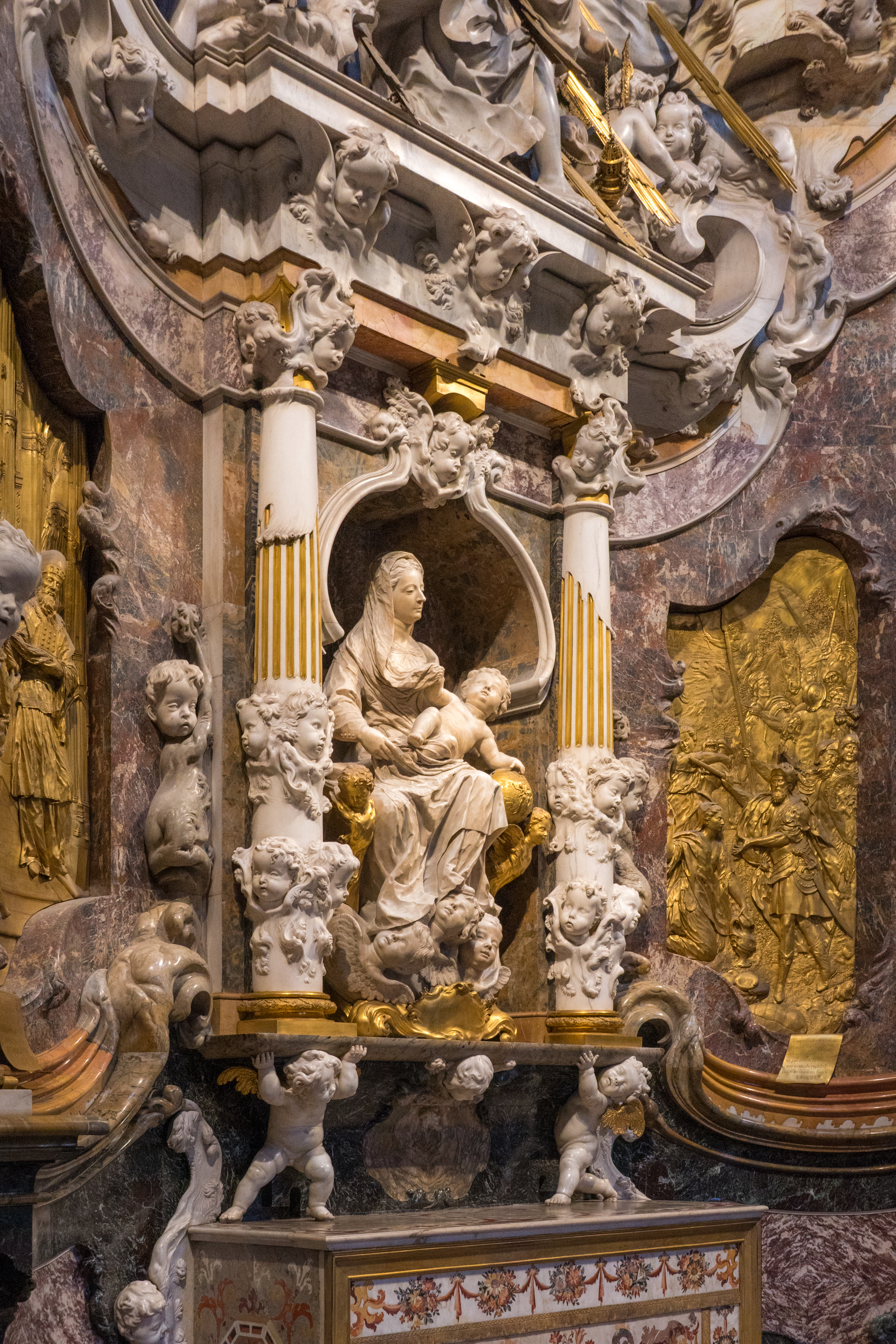
Madonna detail
