= Goyeneche Palace, Nuevo Baztán =

Cultural property in Nuevo Baztán, Spain

Coordinates: 40°21′58″N 3°14′35″W

Palace-Church of San Francisco Javier
- Conjunto Palacio Iglesia de San Francisco Javier y las dos Plazas inmediatas (Spanish)
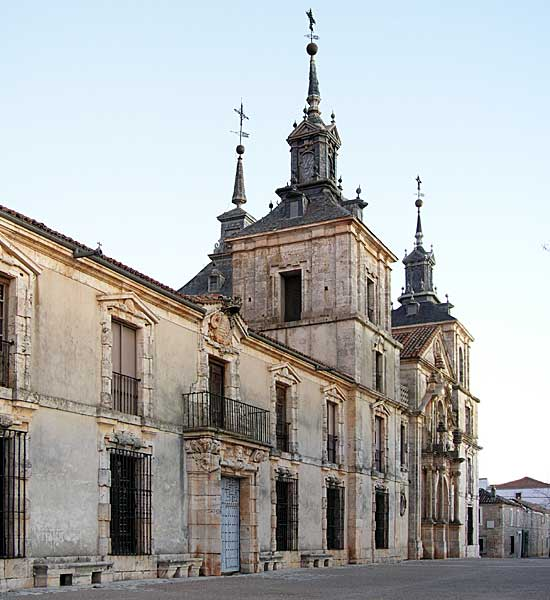
- Goyeneche Palace, composed of the palace on the left and the church of St. Francisco Javier on the right.

- Location within Spain
- Location: Nuevo Baztán, Province of Madrid, Spain

History
- Built: 1709 onwards

Site notes
- Architect: José Benito de Churriguera
- Architectural style: Baroque

Spanish Cultural Heritage
- Type: Non-movable
- Designated: 1941-10-16
- Reference no.: (R.I.) - 53 - 0000007 - 00000

The Goyeneche Palace in Nuevo Baztán, Community of Madrid, Spain, is an eighteenth-century palace with a linked church. It was designed by José de Churriguera, an architect known for a profusely decorated style known as Churrigueresque. The church's interior is an example of this baroque style, whereas the exterior is less ornate.

The building is one of a number of palaces in Spain and Peru which are associated with the Goyeneche family. Nuevo Baztán was built as a model village by Juan de Goyeneche (1656–1735) to accommodate industrial and agricultural projects.

The dedication of the church to Saint Francis Xavier reflects the Navarrese origins of the Goyeneche family.

== Conservation and access ==
Since the 1940s the palace and church have been protected for their historical interest. They currently have the heritage listing of Bien de Interés Cultural along with two squares which form their setting. In 2007 it was reported that the palace was in a poor state of conservation.

=== Current use ===
There have been proposals to restore the palace for use as an art gallery, although the project appears to have been put on hold. The idea was a collaboration between the Community of Madrid and the art-collector Carmen Thyssen-Bornemisza who indicated her willingness to display items from her private collection on long-term loan.

The palace has extensive cellars built for storage purposes and these are used to house an interpretation centre. There are also guided tours of the palace itself.
