= Patek Philippe Calatrava =

Line of dress watches by Patek Philippe

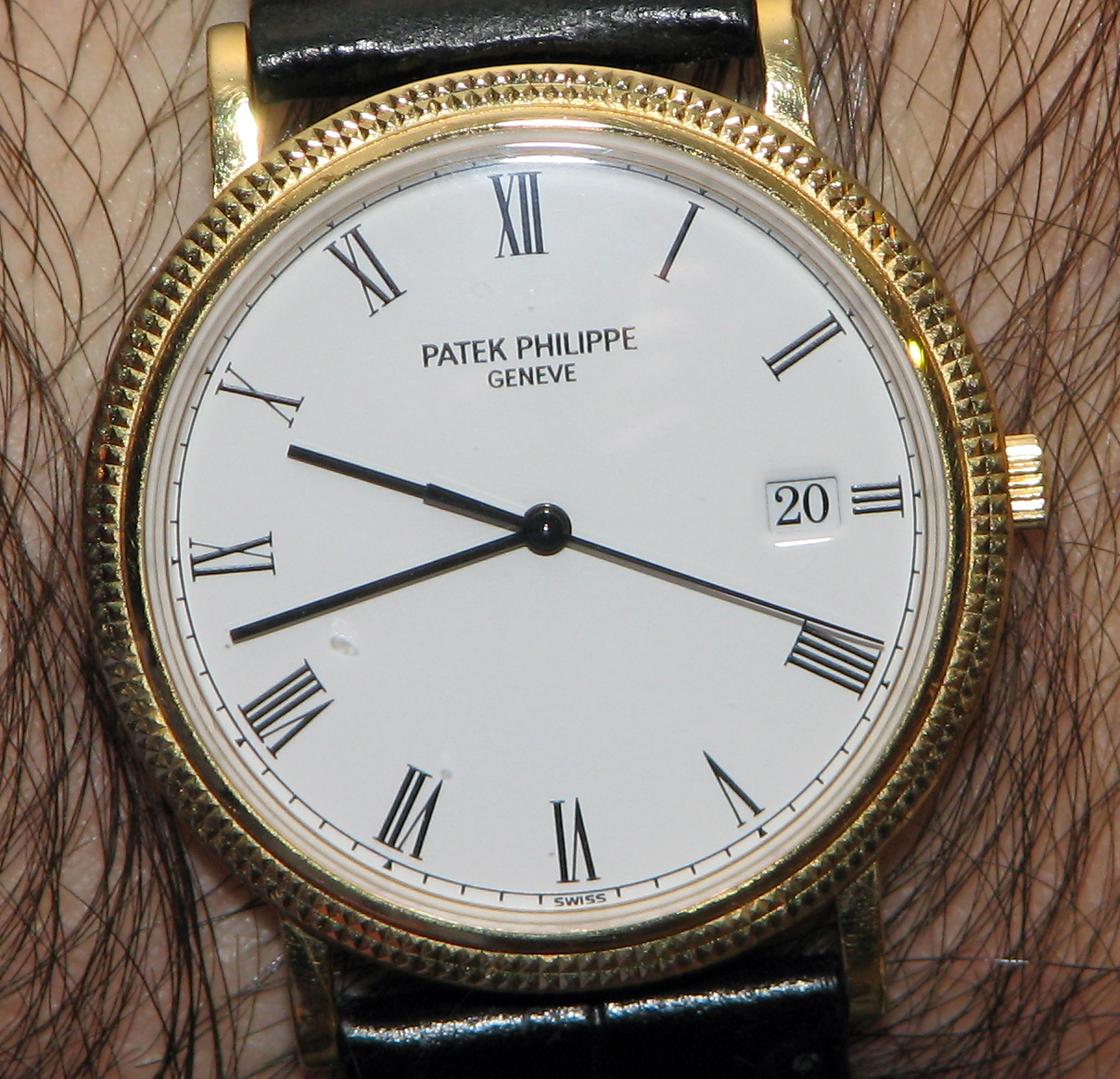
- A circa 1999 men's quartz Calatrava in yellow gold, with second hand and date.
- Type: Automatic, Manual
- Display: Analogue
- Introduced: 1932

The Patek Philippe Calatrava is a line of dress watches built by Swiss watchmaker Patek Philippe. Known for its simple and elegant design, the Calatrava wristwatch has been a flagship model of Patek Philippe since its introduction. The first version of the Calatrava was launched in 1932, inspired by the Bauhaus principle.

== History ==
Patek Philippe Calatrava wristwatch was introduced in 1932, and the first model was Ref. 96. It took its name from the Order of Calatrava, one of the most notable Catholic knighthood orders, which played a major role during the crusades. The watch was originally designed by Henri Stern soon after his father, a dial manufacturer, acquired Patek Philippe in 1932. Calatrava was introduced to help the company pass through the Great Depression smoothly.

The original Calatrava Ref. 96 was produced for over 40 years. Its successor models include Ref. 2526, Ref. 3520, Ref. 5196, and so on. Introduced in 1985, Ref. 3919 was the most popular model in the Calatrava range, with its signature guilloché "Clous de Paris" bezel. After 21 years, it was replaced in March 2006 by the slightly larger 5119 model. This change in size reflected a growing trend for larger watches.

== Watch specifications ==
Patek Philippe has developed a quartz movement, but it is not currently used in the Calatrava range. The only Calatravas earlier using a quartz movement were the 3744 (E27 movement, no date, no second hand) and 3944 (E23 movement, date, second hand).

Some Calatravas (such as the 5227) feature a date function, whereas others (such as the 5116, 5119, 5120, 5123, 5196) display only hours and minutes and, in some cases, seconds (such as the 5026, 6119).

== Price record ==
A Calatrava 2526 model retailed by Tiffany & Co. in 1954 was sold for US$642,500 at an auction in 2018.

As of 2025, the highest auction price reached by a Calatrava is CHF3,297,000 (or around US$3,618,645) for a ref. 570 from 1942. This watch, called "Calatravone" by Italian collectors due to its case size, features a stainless steel case, a two-tone silver dial and black enameled Breguet numerals.
