= Nuevo Baztán =

Coordinates: 40°22′N 3°14′W

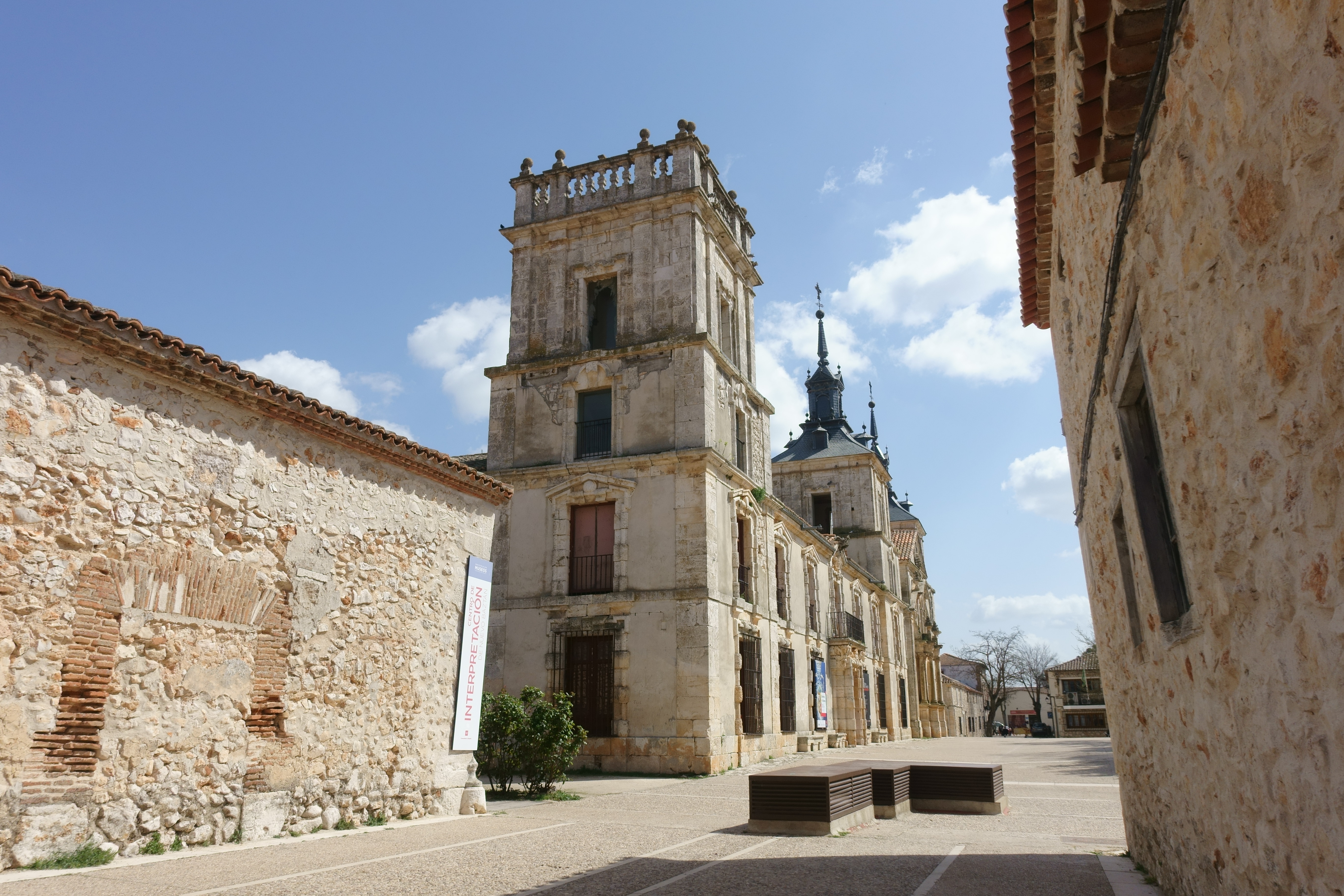

- Flag Coat of arms

- Location in Spain.
- Country: Spain
- Autonomous community: Madrid

Area
  - Total: 20.2 km^{2} (7.8 sq mi)
- Elevation: 831 m (2,726 ft)

Population (2025-01-01)
  - Total: 7,429
  - Density: 368/km^{2} (953/sq mi)
- Time zone: UTC+1 (CET)
  - Summer (DST): UTC+2 (CEST)
- Website: www.ayto-nuevobaztan.com

Nuevo Baztán is a municipality southeast of Madrid, near Alcalá de Henares, Spain. It consists of a small historic centre and modern housing estates.

The historic centre was designed as an industrial and housing complex laid out on a grid plan. It was promoted and developed by the prominent politician and publisher Juan de Goyeneche (1656–1735).

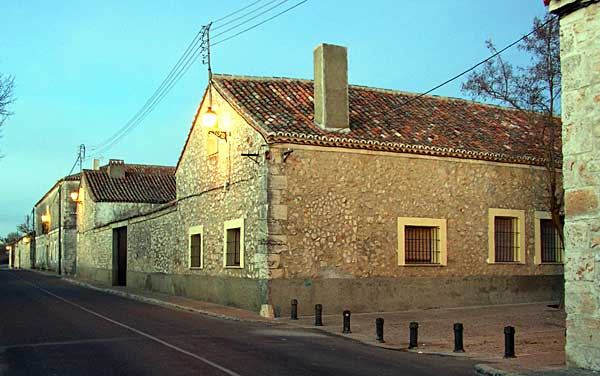
18th-century workers' housing.

== History ==
Nuevo Baztán was founded around 1709 in a mercantalist initiative to promote industrial development in Spain. The site chosen belonged to a locality called Olmeda. The name of the new development refers to the Goyeneche family's home town, Baztan in Navarre. Much of the construction was performed by Agotes imported from Navarre. The town housed factories producing among other things munitions and glassware. The Goyeneche family financed not only the palaces, churches, and factories, but also houses for the employees, many of whom were transplants from other regions of Spain.

Glass production at Nuevo Baztán only lasted a few years because of difficulty in obtaining the necessary fuel supplies locally. Some employees relocated to La Granja de San Ildefonso near Segovia, where there was abundant timber and a demand for glass at a royal palace which was under construction in the 1720s. The other industries of Nuevo Baztán ceased production by the end of the 18th century.

Newer housing has arisen around the 18th-century nucleus in the past decades, and the present town contains large modern developments, including Eurovillas, Las Villas de Nuevo Baztán, Monteacevedo, and El Mirador del Baztán.

== Goyeneche Palace ==
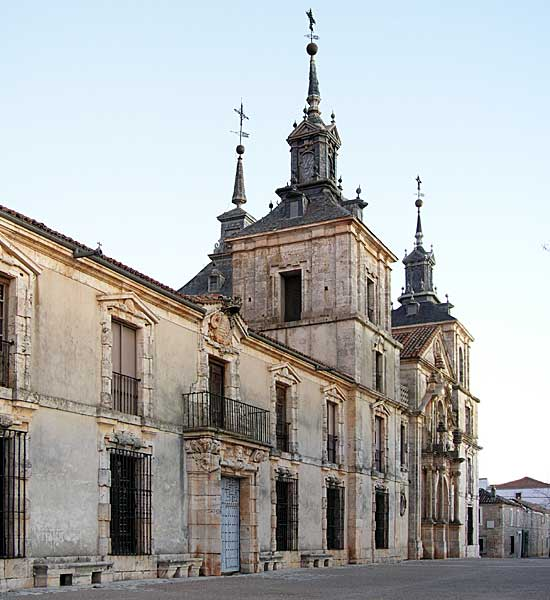
View of the Goyeneche Palace built between 1709 and 1713, comprising two adjacent structures: left, the palace complex itself and, on the right a taller structure, the Church of San Francisco Javier.

The Goyeneche Palace (Spanish: Palacio de Goyeneche or Palacio de Nuevo Baztán) is one of a number of palaces in Spain and Peru associated with the Goyeneche family. The palace was built to a Baroque design by José de Churriguera which incorporates a church.

The palace-church and two plazas were designated as a conservation area in 1941. However, in 2007 it was reported that the palace was in a poor state of conservation. There have been proposals to restore it for use as an art gallery. The palace's wine cellars house an interpretation centre.

== See also ==
- List of planned cities
