= Colegio de Calatrava, Salamanca =

Building in Salamanca, Spain

Colegio de la Inmaculada Concepción de Calatrava
UNESCO World Heritage Site
- Interactive map of Colegio de la Inmaculada Concepción de Calatrava
- Location: Europe Spain; Castile and León Salamanca
- Criteria: I, II, IV
- Reference: 381
- Inscription: 1988 (12th Session)

The Colegio de la Inmaculada Concepción de Calatrava, commonly known as Colegio de Calatrava, is the only college founded in Salamanca by the military orders whose building still survives; it belonged to the Order of Calatrava.

== History ==
Colegio de la Inmaculada Concepción de Calatrava
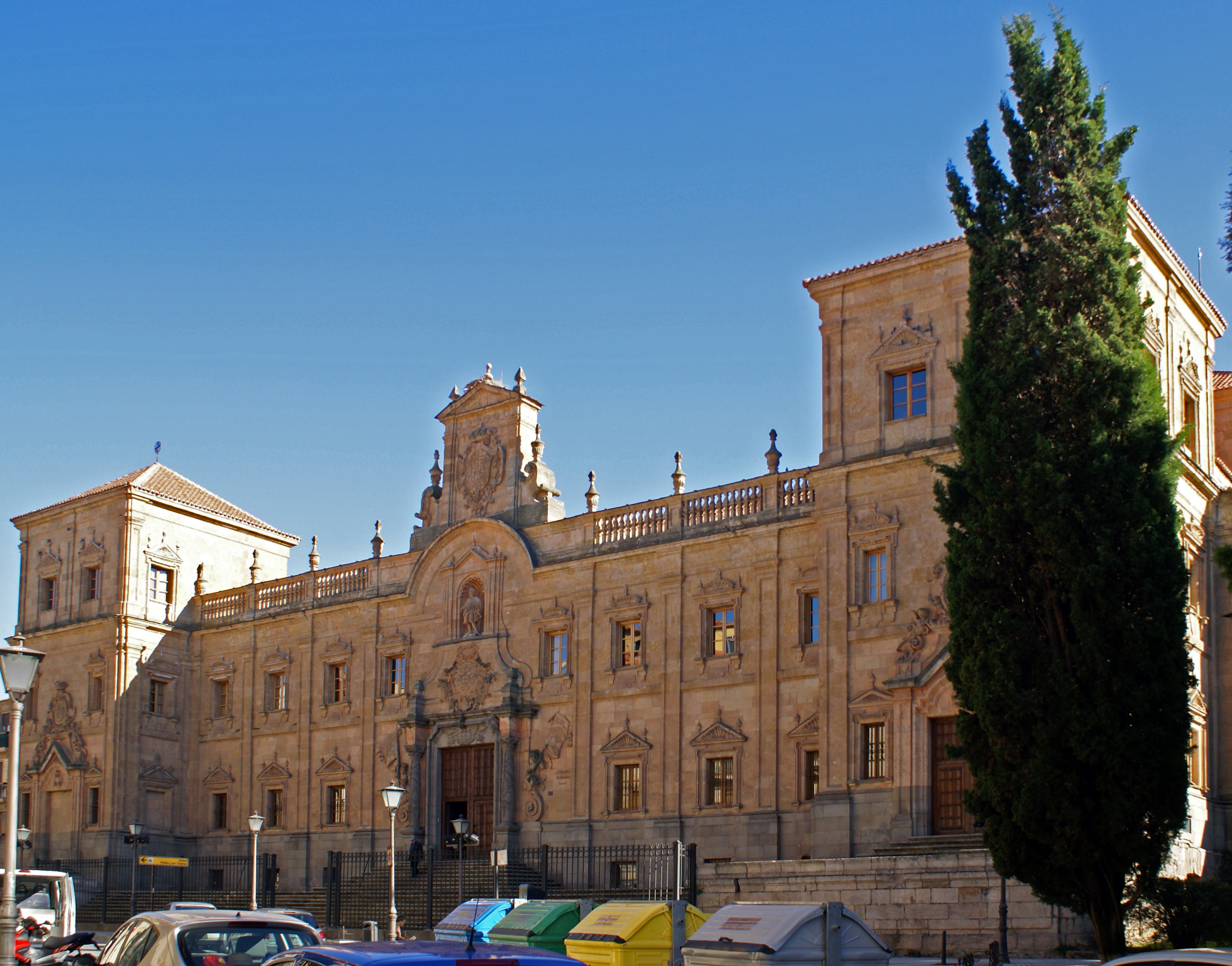
- Interactive map of the Colegio de la Inmaculada Concepción de Calatrava area

General information
- Type: School
- Architectural style: Renaissance
- Location: Castile and León, Salamanca, Spain
- Coordinates: 40.9601°N 5.66105°W
- Current tenants: Casa de la Iglesia
- Opened: 1552
- Owner: Roman Catholic Diocese of Salamanca

Design and construction
- Developer: Order of Calatrava

Instituted as an imperial college in 1552 by Charles V and incorporated into the University of Salamanca in 1554, the construction of this building did not begin until 1717, by Joaquín de Churriguera who directed the works until his death in 1724. In 1750 the works were resumed under the direction of Jerónimo García de Quiñones. He was forced to eliminate the baroque ornaments of the original project due to the neoclassicist ideas prevailing at that time, especially those that Francisco Ibáñez de Corbera, rector of the school when it was consecrated in 1790, wanted to impose. During the War of Independence, the Goya canvases in the altarpieces disappeared.

The facade has two bodies and is articulated by pilasters of giant order and topped with a balustrade. The decorative elements that adorn it are mostly of Renaissance inspiration. We notice in the decoration baroque mixtilinear elements around the main doorway, in the doors of the side towers and in the moldings that surround all the windows of the facade.

Today it is the seat of the Casa de la Iglesia, an institution that houses the offices of the Diocese of Salamanca.

== Bibliography ==
- Sala Balust, Luis (1962–1966). Constituciones, estatutos y ceremonias de los antiguos colegios seculares de la Universidad de Salamanca. Tomo I (in Spanish). Madrid: Centro Superior de Investigaciones Científicas: Patronato "Marcelino Menéndez y Pelayo". p. 15.
