= Narciso Tomé =

Spanish architect

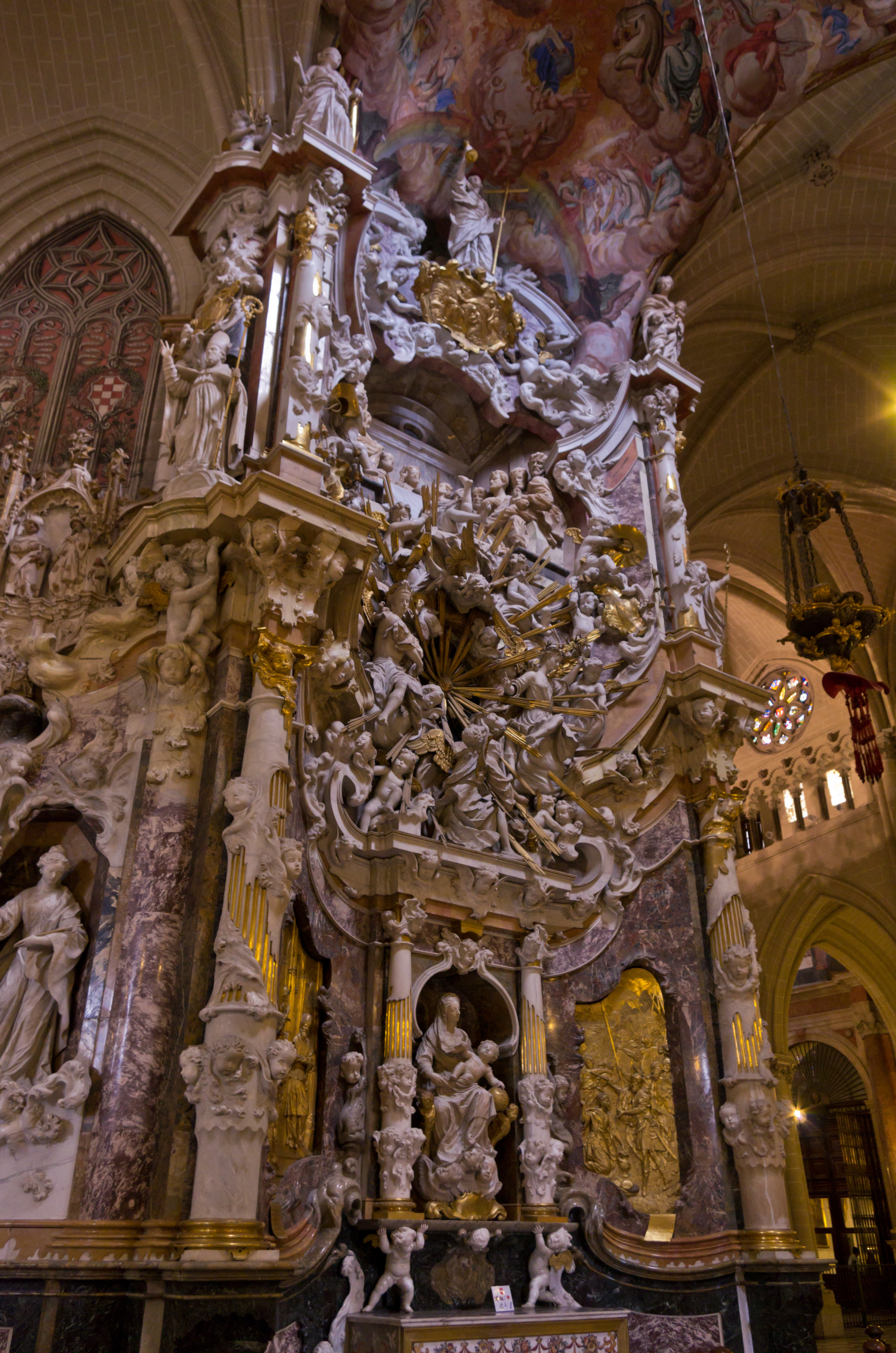
The "Transparente". Toledo Cathedral

Narciso Tomé (1690–1742) was a Spanish architect and sculptor of the late-Baroque or Rococo period.

Tomé was born in Toro, Spain. With his brother, Diego, he sculpted the facade of the University of Valladolid in 1715. In 1721, he was named master of the cathedral of Toledo, for whom he constructed the famous altarwork, the Transparente (1721–1732), and example of the elaborate Spanish Baroque.

El Transparente, derives its name from the play of light on the altar, and is several stories high, with fantastic figures of stucco, painting, bronze castings, and multiple colors of marble, a masterpiece of Baroque mixed media by Narciso Tomé enhanced by the daily effect for a few minutes of a shaft of sunlight striking it through an appropriately oriented hole in the roof, giving the impression that the whole altar is rising to heaven.
