= This too shall pass (disambiguation) =

"This too shall pass" is an adage about the temporary nature of existence.

This Too Shall Pass may also refer to:

- This Too Shall Pass (The Fold album), 2006
- This Too Shall Pass (Tuna album), 2015
- "This Too Shall Pass" (OK Go song), 2010
- "This Too Shall Pass" (Yolanda Adams song), 2005
- "This too shall pass" (composition), a triple concerto by Raminta Šerkšnytė, 2021
- This Too Shall Pass (film), a 2025 drama film
- "This Too Shall Pass", a song by Tay Kewei
- "This Too Shall Pass", a song by Maria Mena
- "This Too Shall Pass", a song by Danny Schmidt
