= Roy Doron =

Israeli musical artist

Roy Doron רוֹי דוֹרוֹן
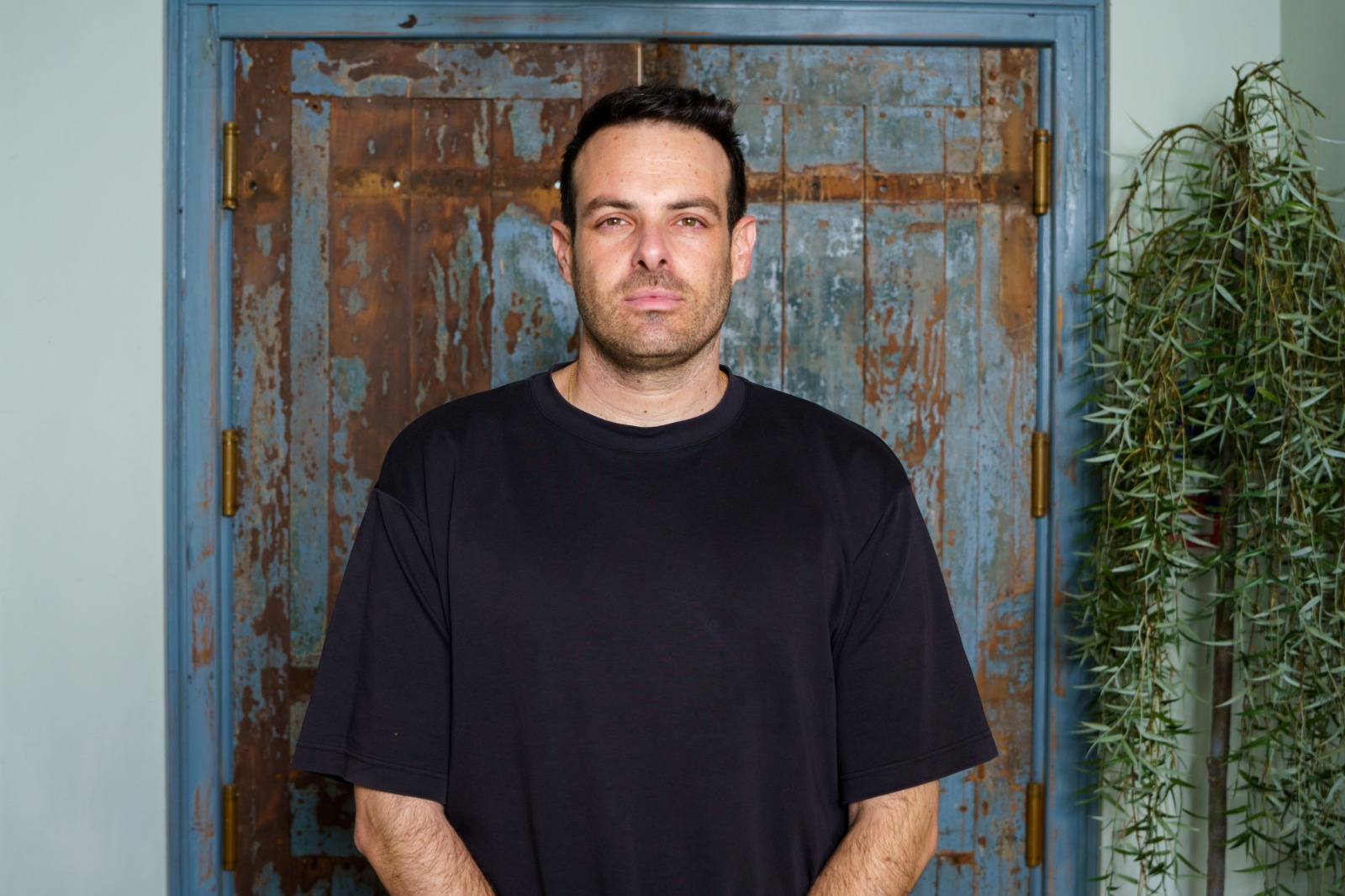

Background information
- Born: 7 April 1990 (age 36); Tel Aviv, Israel
- Origin: Israel
- Genre: Hip hop • Pop • Rock
- Occupations: Musician, singer, composer, music producer

Roy Doron (Hebrew: רוֹי דוֹרוֹן; born 7 April 1990) is an Israeli musician, singer, composer, and music producer.

== Biography ==
Doron grew up in Ra'anana and studied music at Mor Metro-West High School.

Between 2011 and 2014, he studied at "Muzik" College and the Rimon School of Music.

Throughout his career, Doron has produced songs and albums for various artists, including Jimbo J, the band Spa, Itzik Fatzati, Ilan Peled, Jane Bordeaux, Shaanan Streett, The Karkokli Sisters, Daniel Rubin, Amit Ulman, Yermi Kaplan, and Eretz Nehederet.

He plays multiple instruments, including bass guitar, double bass, and guitar. He has participated as both a musician and actor in various theatrical productions. Doron served as the bass guitarist in performances by Jimbo J and Spa, Ravid Plotnik, Aya Zahavi Feiglin, Itzik Fatzati, Ilan Peled, "Oded Paz and the Helmets," Amit Ulman, "Dirty Fly," and Michal Lotan.

Between 2016 and 2020, he performed as both a musician and actor in the play Tichon Magshimim by The Incubator Theater.

In 2022, he composed original music for the play Shmuel, which won Play of the Year at the Golden Hedgehog Award and was nominated in the music category.

That same year, he released his debut album, Schiat Kelev ("Dog Paddle"), featuring nine songs written, composed, and arranged by him.

In 2023, he co-wrote and produced the music for the television series Madrase by Sayed Kashua, directed by Guri Alfi, alongside Neta Weiner.

In 2024, he served as the musical director for the album Mitz LeMax, featuring 71 artists from the Israeli hip-hop scene.

Some of his well-known songs include "Makom Sheni" ("Second Place") featuring Jimbo J and "Shir al Shulchan veMagera" ("A Song About a Table and a Drawer") featuring Aya Zahavi Feiglin.

== Discography ==
- Schiat Kelev (2022) – debut album featuring Aya Zahavi Feiglin and Jimbo J
- Ma Rappers Rotzim (co-produced with Itzik Fatzati)
- Ovdai Namel (composer and producer, 2021)
- Ah Wow (composer and producer, 2023)
- Mitz LeMax (producer, 2024)
- Machlut – album by Neta Weiner
- HaChaim Baderech – album by Itai Kfir
- Me'ever LaCheshek – album by Amit Ulman
- Mitargelim LeDissonance – album by Tzad G (co-produced with Amotz Glas)
