= This City (film) =

- Directed by: Amit Ulman
- Written by: Amit Ulman
- Starring: Amit Ulman, Moria Akons, Omer Havron
- Release date: July 2023
- Country: Israel
- Language: Hebrew

This City (Hebrew: העיר הזאת, Ha'ir Hazot) is an Israeli rap opera detective film based on a musical of the same name by Amit Ulman. The film was produced by Drom Productions and Incubator Theater, where the original musical was performed, with crowdfunding support through Headstart. It was released in July 2023. The film follows detective Joe's investigation of a murder mystery that becomes complicated when it's revealed that a major criminal is involved. It was written in the style of film noir.

== Plot ==
Private investigators Joe and Jack receive a visit from Sarah Bennett, who asks for Joe's help in investigating her sister Naomi's disappearance.

Police Inspector McMurphy and his partner Chucky suspect that detective Joe killed his partner, murdered Naomi Bennett, and fabricated his connection with her sister Sarah.

Joe is interrogated by the police, confesses to the murder, and is sentenced to death by hanging. Just before he is to be hanged, in his last words speech, Joe reveals to the crowd the identity of Menashe, who is also responsible for Naomi Bennett's murder. Menashe is arrested on the spot.

== Creation of the film ==
In 2008, Amit Ulman first presented one of the scenes from "This City" to his band members from "Victor Jackson," including Jimbo J and Itzhik Pitzatzi. The band performed the scene in shows, and after its success, they expanded the single scene into a detective story that became the "This City" musical, which was performed from 2012 to 2022.

=== From theater to cinema ===
The show ran for about a decade, and from its early days, Ulman aspired to film a cinematic version. The transition to cinema brought challenges such as creating a city that doesn't look Israeli or modern, and building a new and dark world inspired by film noir on one hand and hip-hop culture on the other. The chosen costumes were period-appropriate, and the actors' makeup design references classic detective films.

The film's cinematic language is innovative in that the entire script is one long song, with almost all dialogue written in rhymes and accompanied by musical instruments.

== Cast ==
=== Main characters ===
Actor	Character	Role
Amit Ulman	Joe Halfon	Cynical and bitter detective
Moriah Akons	Sarah Bennett	Searching for her missing sister, went to high school with Joe
Omer Havron (Jimbo J)	Jack Halperin	Investigator and Joe's partner who is murdered during the film
Alon Neuman	Shlomi McMurphy	Police inspector, described as an honest cop, but at the end of the film is revealed to be "Menashe," the city's big criminal
Idan Alterman	Barnaby Shimoni	Messenger of the big criminal Menashe
Omer Mor (Itzhik Pitzatzi)	Unnamed musician	Street musician who plays and appears in the background throughout the film
Jeremiah Omen (Jeremiah)	Charlie (Chucky) Mesika	Inspector McMurphy's new partner since Jack's murder

=== Supporting characters ===
Actor	Character
Uri Ambar (Toxico)	Newspaper hawker
Peled	Criminal, dealer in stolen watches
Reuven Aragai (Tedross)	Homeless person
Itai Zvulon (Tuna)	Prisoner
Jonathan Blumenfeld	Arkadi, pianist at the "Barbonia" club
Guy Ron	Prison guard
Arik Eshet	Priest, Jack's eulogist
Tal Tirangel	Number 3, city resident
Sima Barami	Jacqueline, city resident
Sherry Atzitz	Sandy, city resident
Eko Morgenstern	Drug dealer
Karin Cohen	Waitress at the "Barbonia" club
Doron Goverman	Jack's wife
Ravid Plotnik	Corn seller and Joe's double
Shira Alterman	Naomi Bennett, Sarah's sister
Peter Kenner	Yoav Remez, fundraiser
Yosef Albeck	Taxi driver
