= Finis Gloriae Mundi =

1672 oil painting in Seville

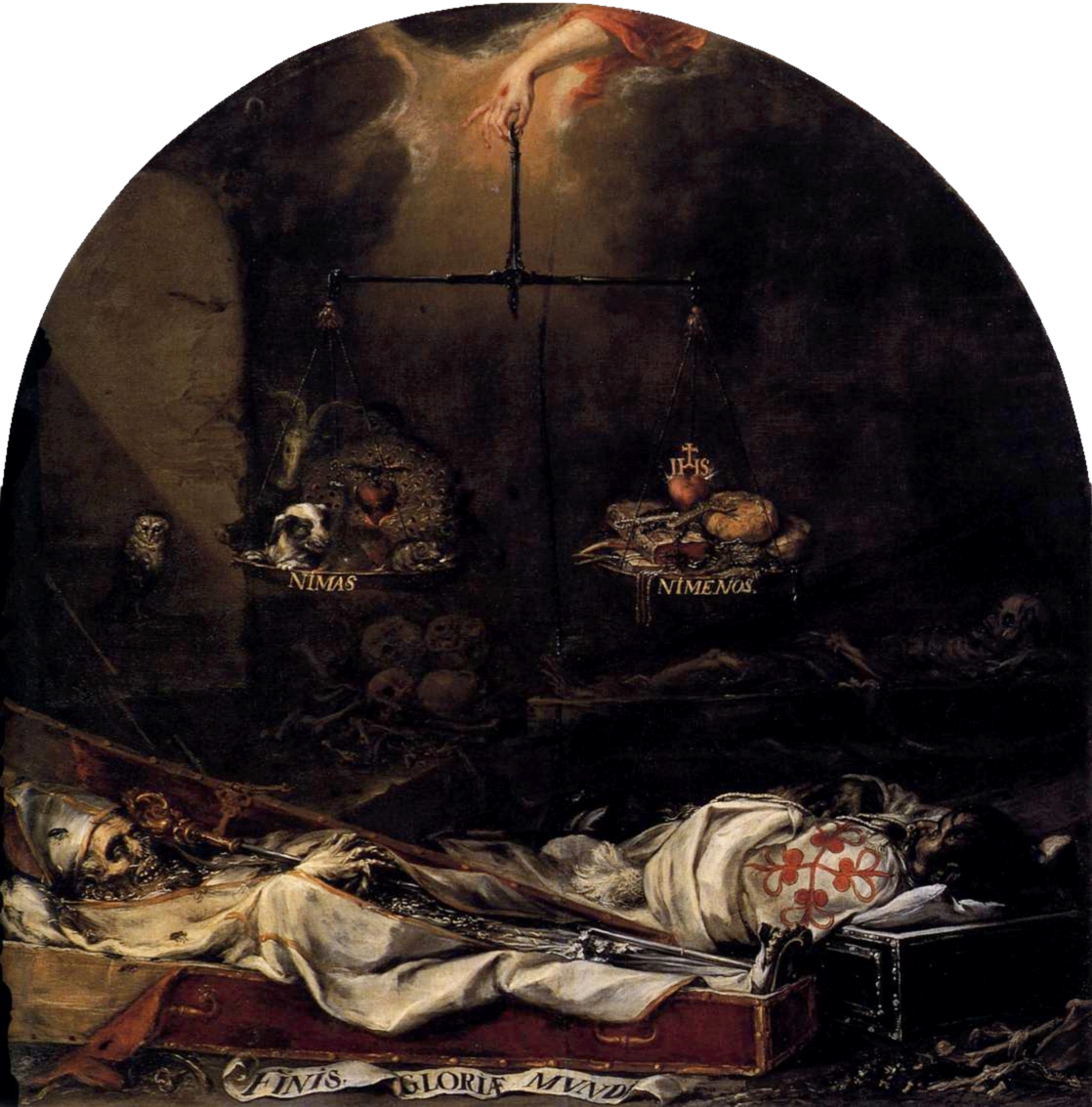
- Artist: Juan de Valdés Leal
- Year: 1670–1672
- Medium: Oil on canvas
- Dimensions: 220 cm × 216 cm (87 in × 85 in)
- Location: Seville, Spain

Finis Gloriae Mundi is an oil painting made by Juan de Valdés Leal between 1670 and 1672, which, along with In Ictu Oculi, was commissioned by Miguel Mañara to be placed below the choir of the church in the Hospital de la Claridad in Seville. Its dimensions are 220 x 216 cm finishing in an arc on the top. Both paintings together are also named "The Hieroglyphs of Life's End" or "The End of Life".

== Commission ==
Juan de Valdés Leal was born in Seville (1622-1690), and continued working in the city despite constant crisis, mostly painting for churches and monasteries that commissioned religious paintings. Miguel de Mañara, founder of the Hospital de la Claridad, commissioned the artist with three artworks.

The first artwork, La Exaltación de la Cruz, presides over the choir of the church, narrating the episode where Emperor Heraclius returns the Holy Cross to Jerasulem in 629 AD. The other two were commissioned to make clear the transience of material goods and virtues, in the style of the Vanitas genre, popular at the time.

== Historical context ==
The paintings were created during the Counter-Reformation, a Catholic movement in response to the Protestant Reformation to try and gain more members and dominance. As a result of this, churches started to cover themselves in artwork, gilded masterpieces and statues that reinforced their faith, leading to a new age in religious artwork.

Between 1647 and 1652, the Great Plague of Seville, believed to have been the bubonic plague brought by a ship from Algeria, affected most of Andalusia and the eastern coast, reaching as far as Barcelona. It particularly affected Seville, which took no quarantine measures during the outbreak, eventually killing a quarter of its population.

Plagues were very common in Seville in the 17th century, three plagues having ravaged the city in this period, bringing the population from 150,000 in 1588 to 85,000 by the next century. The Hermandad de la Santa Caridad was an institution that has origins in 1456, and dedicated to collecting drowned corpses and burying the poor and executed, and was among others that were born due to the Counter-Reformation, Seville transforming into a sort of convent-city by 1671 with 45 friar monasteries and 28 female convents.

== Description ==
The artwork can be separated into three main planes. In the first, one can observe two corpses arranged in coffins. The first cadaver is dressed in the vestments of a bishop, surrounded by insects, while the second is a man dressed in knightly garb. In front of them is a ribbon with the phrase that gives the name of the painting, "Finis Gloriae Mundi" (End of worldly glories). In the second plane on the top, a hand illuminated within the clouds holds a balance with various objects on each saucer, the one on the left holds a pig, a goat, a peacock and a growling dog, accompanied by the phrase "ni más" (no more), while the saucer on the right holds some books, a heart with letters JHS and the phrase "ni menos" (no less).

Finally, in the background, a barely illuminated owl on the left, as well as some skulls on top of various bones, and a third corpse resting on the ground.

== Analysis ==
In the first plane, one can observe two corpses. The first is of a bishop, which can be deduced from the fact it wears clothing typically worn by bishops.

The second body is the corpse of a soldier of the Order of Calatrava, covered by a cloak inscribed with its symbols. The soldiers of the Order of Calatrava probably had positive connotations to the artist, for example bravery and courage which is demonstrated by its historic origin, expelling Muslims from Christian territory.

In the background there is an owl, an animal related to the darkness due to its nocturnal nature, as well as many skulls and bones. In the second plane on the top, you can observe an allusion to the judgement of souls normally represented by Saint Michael the Archangel holding a balance, in this case it's the hand of Christ, surrounded by clouds and the golden halo which illuminates them. The left saucer of the balance contains symbols of the capital sins, containing an apple which represents the original sin, the pig representing gluttony, the peacock representing pride, and the growling dog probably symbolizing wrath, and there is a small almost not visible bat above the apple related with jealousy, as it was said that by not being either bird or rat it ended up being jealous of both animals.

The saucer on the right holds different elements related to virtue, prayer, penance and charity, with the initials JHS referring to Jesus. The significance is made clear by the text accompanied by each saucer, "Neither more sins are necessary for condemnation, nor less virtues are necessary for salvation." This reaffirms the idea that humans possess the capacity to level the balance with their actions.

It can then be deduced that the artwork is meant to represent the transience of human life and the pleasures it entails, leaving salvation of the soul to free will. The elements in the artwork show a moral message to those who see it, and it fulfils the purpose of the Counter-Reformation to make clear that salvation can be achieved by human actions and through joining the church.

== See also ==
- Sic transit gloria mundi
