= Raminta =

- Pronunciation: [rɐˈmɪntɐ]
- Gender: female

Origin
- Origin: Lithuanian
- Meaning: peaceful, tranquil, serene
- Region of origin: Lithuania

Other names
- Related names: Ramutė, Rima, Rimantė

Raminta is a Lithuanian feminine given name. There is also possible masculine form Ramintas.

The name comes from Lithuanian word ramus/rami which means "peaceful, tranquil, serene". The day of this name is March 6. The name may refer to:

- Raminta Dvariškytė (born 1990), Lithuanian swimmer
- Raminta Elena Kuprevičienė (born 1938), Lithuanian paper restorer
- Raminta Popovienė, Lithuanian music educator and politician
- Raminta Šerkšnytė (born 1975), Lithuanian composer
