= In Ictu Oculi =

Painting by Juan de Valdés Leal

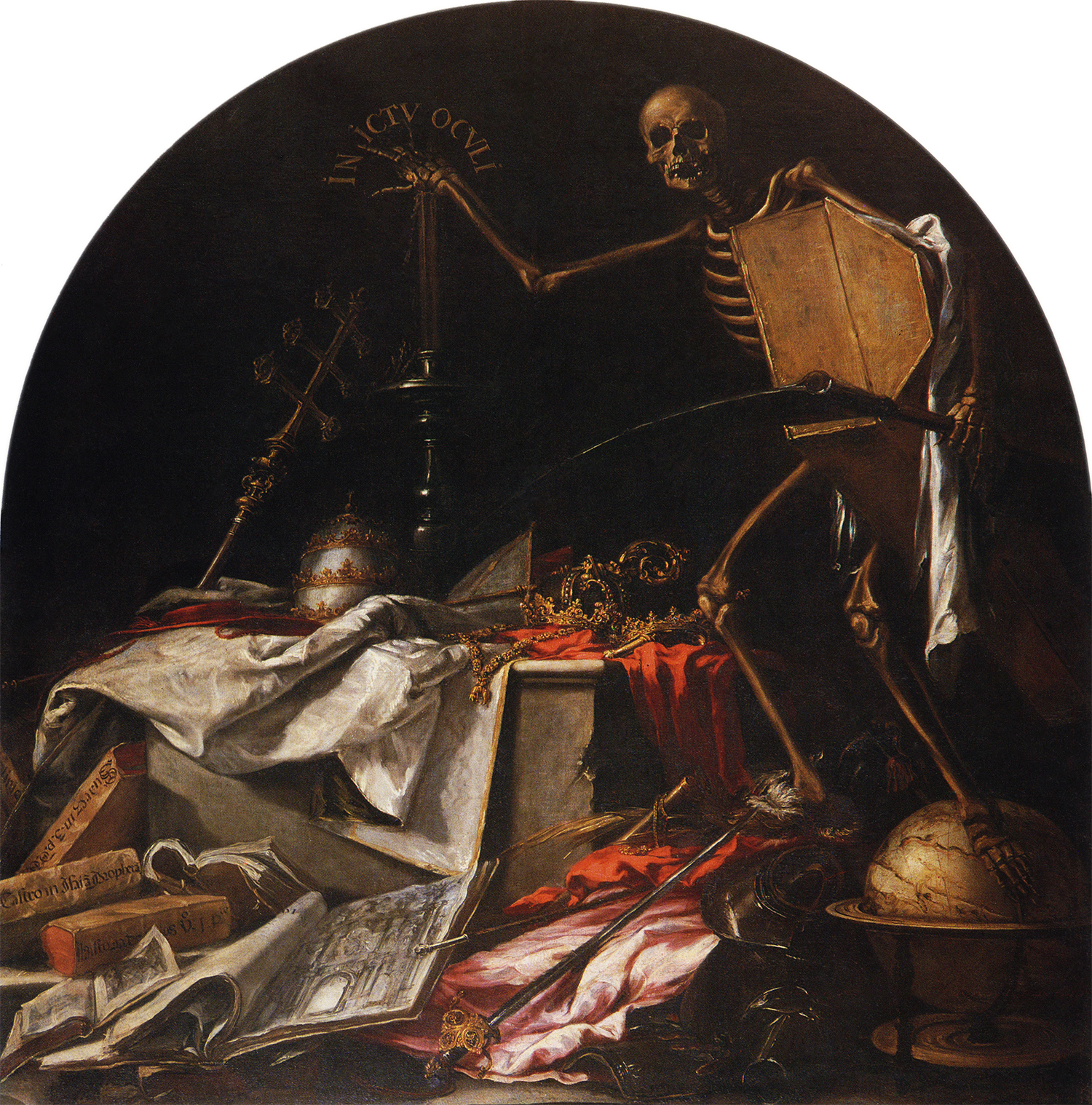
In Ictu Oculi, 220 x 216 cm, Hospital de la Caridad, Seville

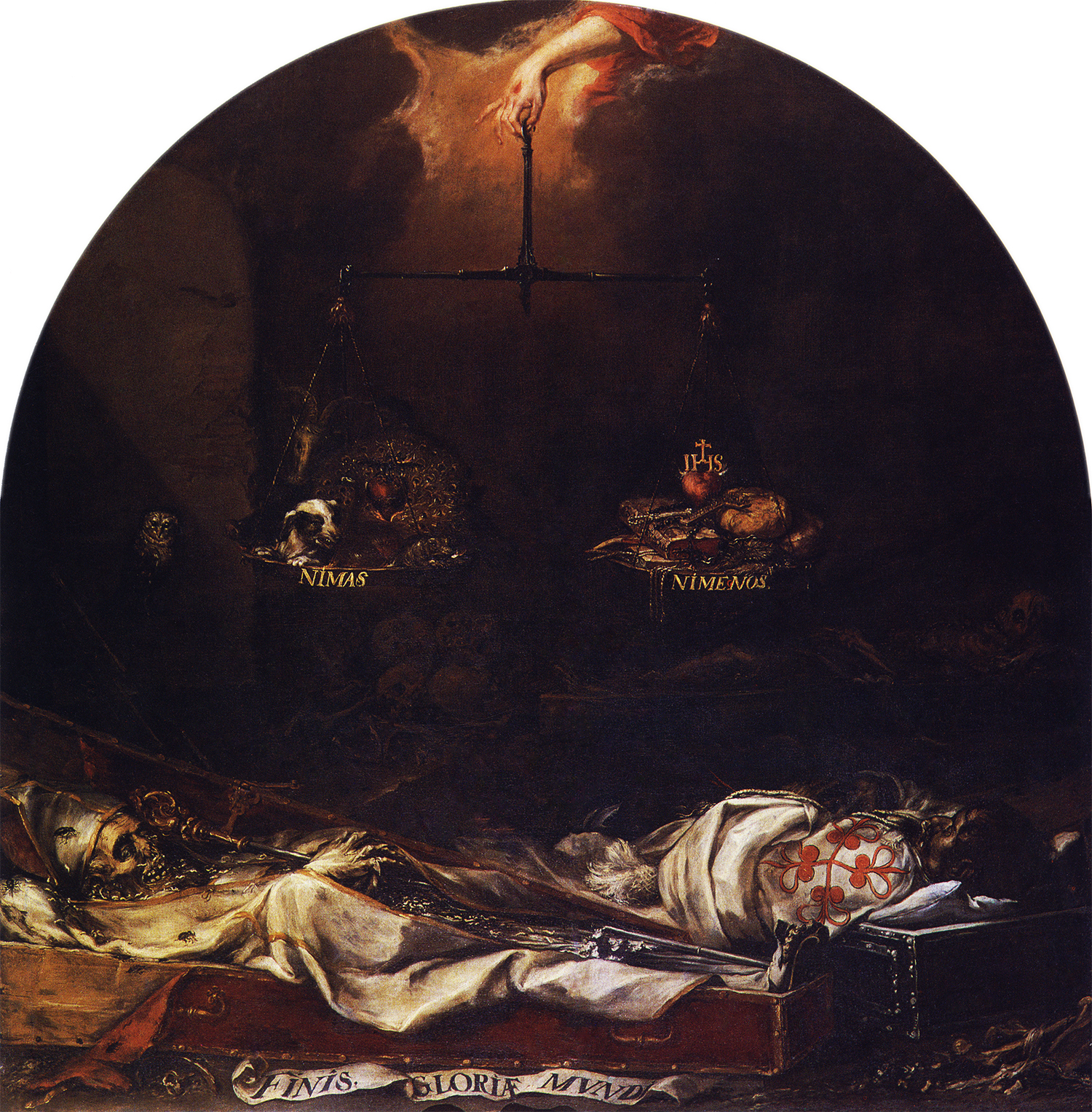
Finis Gloriae Mundi, 1672, Hospital de la Caridad, Seville

In Ictu Oculi (In the blink of an eye) is a large oil on canvas painting by the Spanish Baroque artist Juan de Valdés Leal. It is dated to 1670-72, and was commissioned by the Brotherhood of Charity (Hermandad de la Caridad) lay confraternity for the Hospital de la Caridad, Seville, a resting place for the old and a burial ground for paupers.

The work is one of a pair of similar memento mori paintings - the other painting Finis Gloriae Mundi shows the remains of a bishop and knight. In Ictu Oculi shows the grim reaper carrying a coffin and scythe, triumphant among the remains of a now dead, but a formerly powerful and influential unidentified person. Both paintings are still in place just inside the hospital entrance. They are considered the pinnacle of his artistic achievement, to the extent that he has been, perhaps unfairly, referred to as the "painter of the dead".

A close copy by Reynoso dated to the 1860s–70s is in the Metropolitan Museum of Art, New York City.

== Commission ==
In Ictu Oculi is one of a pair of dramatically chilling, grim and similarly sized works by Leal commissioned for the Hospital de la Caridad; the other is Finis Gloriae Mundi (End of worldly glory) and depicts the rotting corpses of a bishop and a knight, both lying in repose in a crypt, and surrounded by the trappings of money and position.

Each painting is an allegory of death, or memento mori, in that they are intended to remind the viewer of both transience of earthly life and the universality of death. Valdés Leal described these works as "hieroglyphs of our afterlife". The implication is that salvation in the afterlife is paramount and rises above position in the here and now, and can only be attained through charity - the mission of the commissioning church. Artwork showing these themes are recurrent in the Vanitas genre, meaning vanity and shows the transience of life in contrast to worldly pleasures.

== Description ==
The central skeletal character in In Ictu Oculi is a personification of death. He holds a coffin under his arm and a scythe in his hand as one foot treads upon a celestial sphere. He stands before various symbols of wealth, power and learning, including scrolls and letters, the globe, jewelry, a tiara (imperial crown), velvet purple and white royal, clerical robes, and some arms. On the front, a book is open with an illustration of a triumphal arc, a motif used to celebrate victory in battle. Death extinguishes a candle with his right hand - the representation of the briefness of life which both lasts and can be ended "In the blink of an eye". Text above the taper contains the Latin motto. The motto comes from the latin translation of Corinthians 15:52 "In momento in ictu oculi in novissima tuba canet enim et mortui resurgent incorrupti et nos inmutabimur" (In a moment, in the twinkling of an eye, at the last trump, for the trumpet shall sound, and the dead shall be raised incorruptible, and we shall be changed).

A volume of Rubens' designs for Antwerp's triumphal arches for the 1634 reception of the new Spanish governor, Cardinal-Infante Ferdinand of Austria, is intended as a symbol of political disillusionment. The inclusion of letters is innovative, and warns that fame achieved through learning and science will also be leveled by death.

== Sources ==
- González de León, Fernando. "The road to Rocroi: class, culture and command in the Spanish Army". Leiden-Boston, The Netherlands: Brill, 2009. ISBN 978-9004-17082-7
- Harris, Ann. "Seventeenth-Century Art & Architecture". Upper Saddle River, NJ: Pearson Prentice Hall, 2005. ISBN 978-0131-45577-1
- Larsen, Erik. Art Journal, Vol 32, no. 4, 1973
- Symington, Andy. Andalucía. Bath: Footprint, 2004. ISBN 978-1906-09851-3
- Walther, Ingo. "Painting of the Baroque". Taschen GmbH, 1997. ISBN 978-3-8228-8253-5
