= Luisa de Morales =

Spanish artist (1654–died after 1685)

Luisa Rafaela de Valdés Morales (1654 – after 1685), known as Luisa de Morales and Maria Luisa Morales, was a Spanish painter and engraver, and daughter and disciple of Juan de Valdés Leal. The current (2022) exhibition of her father's work at the Museo de Bellas Artes in Seville shows her completing some of his sculptures by adding finely painted details of clothing etc. Several of her small drawings of Seville can also be seen.

== Biography ==
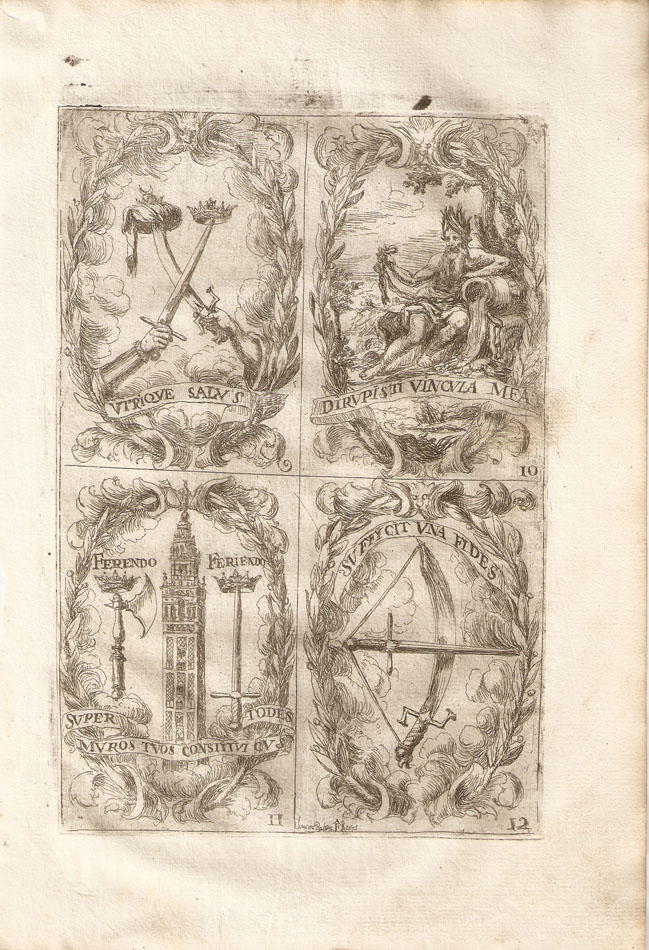
Engraving by Luisa de Morales

Morales was the first-born daughter of painter Juan de Valdés Leal and his wife, Isabel Martínez de Morales (also known as Isabel de Morales Carrasquilla), who according to some sources was also a painter. Maria was baptized in the parish of San Pedro in Córdoba on December 26, 1654.

Her famous personal works are the three illustrations in a book by Fernando de la Torre Farfán, Fiestas de la S. Iglesia metropolitana, Patriarcal de Sevilla al Nuevo Culto del Señor Rey S. Fernando el Tercero de Castilla y de León.

In August of 1672 she was married in the parish of San Andrés in Seville to Felipe Martínez. In November of the following year she baptized her first daughter, Catalina. After three years of marriage, however, Morales got her marriage annulled and moved back home to her parents with her daughter and stayed there from 1674 to 1686.

== Bibliography ==
- Ceán Bermúdez, Juan Agustín, Diccionario de los más ilustres profesores de las Bellas Artes en España, Madrid, 1800.
- Kinkead, Duncan T., Pintores y doradores en Sevilla 1650-1699. Documentos, Bloomington In., AuthorHouse, 2006, ISBN 1-4259-7205-5
- Valdivieso, Enrique, Juan de Valdés Leal, Sevilla, 1988, Ediciones Guadalquivir, ISBN 84-86080-08-8
