= This too shall pass (composition) =

Composition by Raminta Šerkšnytė

- Triple concerto by Raminta Šerkšnytė
- Based on: "This too shall pass"
- Performed: 30 September 2021 Kronberg Academy
- Duration: 8 minutes
- Scoring: violin; cello; vibraphone; string orchestra

This too shall pass is a composition for solo violin, cello and vibraphone, and string orchestra by Raminta Šerkšnytė, first performed on 30 September 2021 in Kronberg, Hesse, Germany. It interprets the phrase "This too shall pass" about the transience of time.

== History ==
The Lithuanian composer Raminta Šerkšnytė wrote This too shall pass on a commission from the Kronberg Academy, to be played by Gidon Kremer and the orchestra Kremerata Baltica at the Kronberg Academy Festival in Kronberg, Hesse, Germany. She wrote it as an interpretation of the phrase "This too shall pass", dealing with the transience of time. She scored the work for solos for violin, cello and vibraphone, with string orchestra.

This too shall pass was first performed on 30 September 2021 at the Stadthalle Kronberg in the presence of the composer, played by Kremer as the violinist, cellist Erica Piccotti and vibraphonist Andrei Pushkarev, and the Kremerata Baltica conducted by Teresa Riveiro-Böhm. The composition of eight minutes was one of three world premieres of works composed by women during the festival, which had the motto "Woman Power Music", in German ambiguous as both "Frau Macht Musik" and "Frau macht Musik" (Woman makes music). In the concert at the Stadthalle Kronberg, This too shall pass was paired with Sofia Gubaidulina's Seven Words and a pasticcio of works by Astor Piazzolla.

The composer introduced her work, saying that "this too shall pass" summarises the transience of everything happening in nature and human life: youth, beauty, depressing and joyful moments, which invites to look for eternal values and to appreciate every moment. She wrote that in the piece, the vibraphone is a symbol of the constant flow of time, contrasted with the "heavenly" cello, the violin representing the short and transient time of a human, and the orchestra the powerful stream of time.

Reviewer Wolfgang Sandner from the FAZ regarded the work as the highlight of the first two festival concerts. He noted the composer's gift for melodies, developing lines with an unerring sense of sound. He described a steady pulse of the vibraphone, and fine transitions from the delicate violin lines to the sonorous cello voice, and summarised: "Raminta Šerkšnyté's music rests in itself in an almost magical way." ("Raminta Šerkšnytés Musik ruht in nahezu magischer Weise in sich.")
