= In ictu oculi =

Latin phrase

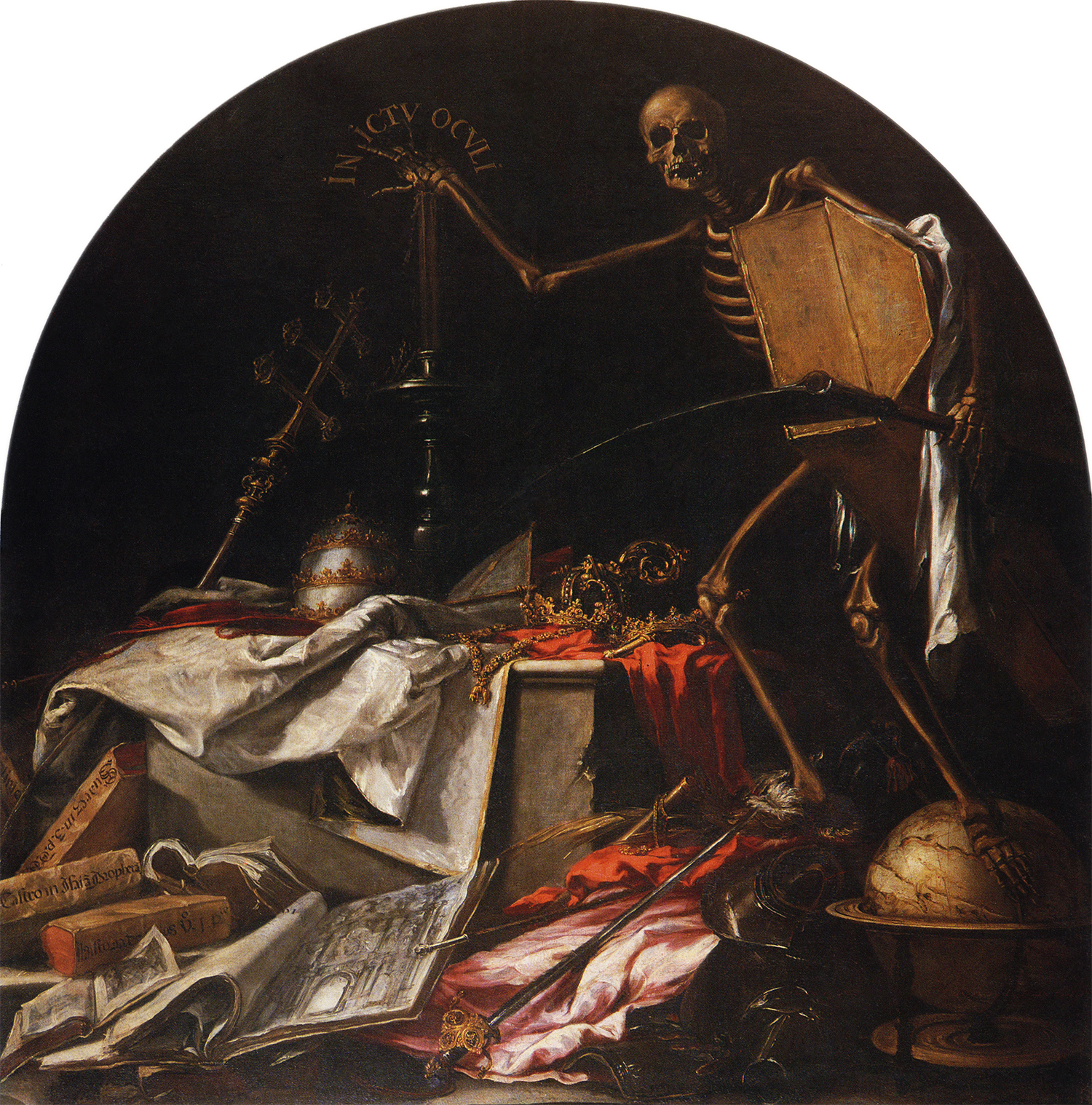
in ictu oculi, a vanitas by Juan de Valdés Leal for the Hospital de la Caridad (Seville).

The phrase in ictu oculi is a Latin expression meaning "in the blink of an eye". One source is from the Bible, in 1 Corinthians 15:52: "In momento, in ictu oculi, in novissima tuba", translated in the KJV as "In a moment, in the twinkling of an eye, at the last trump:" where the Latin is itself a translation of the original Koine Greek phrase ἐν ῥιπῇ ὀφθαλμοῦ (en rhipēi ophthalmou). The phrase was used by Henry of Huntingdon on the rapid submission to the coronation of Stephen of England in 1135: Sine mora, sine labore, quasi in ictu oculi. It also appears as part of the text to a motet by Antoine Busnois entitled "Gaude celestis Domina".

The most notable use of the phrase in an English text is that by John Donne: which shall be found alive upon the earth, we say there shall be a sudden death, and a sudden resurrection; In raptu, in transitu, in ictu oculi, where Donne gives an English-Latin paraphrase on the original context in 1 Corinthians 15.

== Works of art ==
More than the original context of the phrase itself, the Latin may be better known as the title of a painting by Juan de Valdés Leal (4 May 1622 – 1690). This painting, an allegory of death (c.1671), is one of two large still life allegorical vanitas paintings, 2.2 metres (7 ft 3 in) high, by Valdés Leal, painted for the Charity Hospital of Seville. The central character is a skeleton; on the floor lies an open coffin and symbols of wealth and power. The skeleton extinguishes a candle which represents life, and above the taper is written the Latin motto. A volume of Rubens' designs for Antwerp's triumphal arches for the 1634 reception of the new Spanish governor, Cardinal-Infante Ferdinand, stands as a symbol of political disillusionment. The other painting of the pair is Finis Gloriae Mundi, "End of worldly glory," which depicts a dead bishop and a knight.

The painting is a reflection of the vanitas concept in Spanish music of the same period, as illustrated in in ictu oculi. Música española del siglo XVII, a recording by the Spanish early music ensemble Los Músicos de Su Alteza in 2002. The name has also been used for a painting by Diango Hernandez (born 1970) in 2004.
