= This Too Shall Pass (Tuna album) =

2015 studio album by Tuna

Studio album by Tuna
- Released: August 6, 2015
- Recorded: 2015
- Studio: Nunstudio
- Genre: Israeli hip hop
- Length: 47:17
- Language: Hebrew
- Label: Anana
- Producer: Nir Danan and Yakir Ben Tov

Tuna chronology
This Too Shall Pass (2015)	TunaPark (2017)

This Too Shall Pass (Hebrew: גם זה יעבור, Gam Zeh Ya'avor) is the debut album by Israeli rapper Tuna, which released on August 6, 2015, by Israeli record label Anana.

The first single and titular track from the album "Gam Zeh Ya'avor" reached the top of Media Forest weekly chart.

This Too Shall Pass features guest appearances from Ravid Plotnik, Shlomi Saranga and Shi 360, among others.

== Track listing ==
This Too Shall Pass
No.	Title	Writer(s)	Translation	Length
1.	"Gam Zeh Ya'avor"	Itay Zvulun	This Too Shall Pass	5:02
2.	"Rock 30"	Itay Zvulun; Nir Danan; Yakir Ben Tov		4:24
3.	"Seret Aravi"	Zvulun	Arab Movie	5:07
4.	"Omdim Bamakom"	Zvulun; Danan; Ben Tov	Standing In Place	3:36
5.	"Bon Voyage" (featuring Soul J, Ortega and Shi 360)	Zvulun; Alon Blum; Yonatan Yehudai; Shai Haddad; Ben Tov		5:46
6.	"Marpekim"	Zvulun	Elbows	4:46
7.	"Olam Meshuga" (featuring Ravid Plotnik)	Zvulun; Danan; Ravid Plotnik	Crazy World	5:55
8.	"Schnitzelim"	Zvulun; Danan	Chicken Fingers	3:44
9.	"Lama Lo Achshav" (featuring Shlomi Saranga)	Zvulun	Why Not Now	3:53
10.	"Nishar Bachayim"	Zvulun	Staying Alive	5:04
Total length:				47:17
