= Lucas de Valdés =

Spanish painter

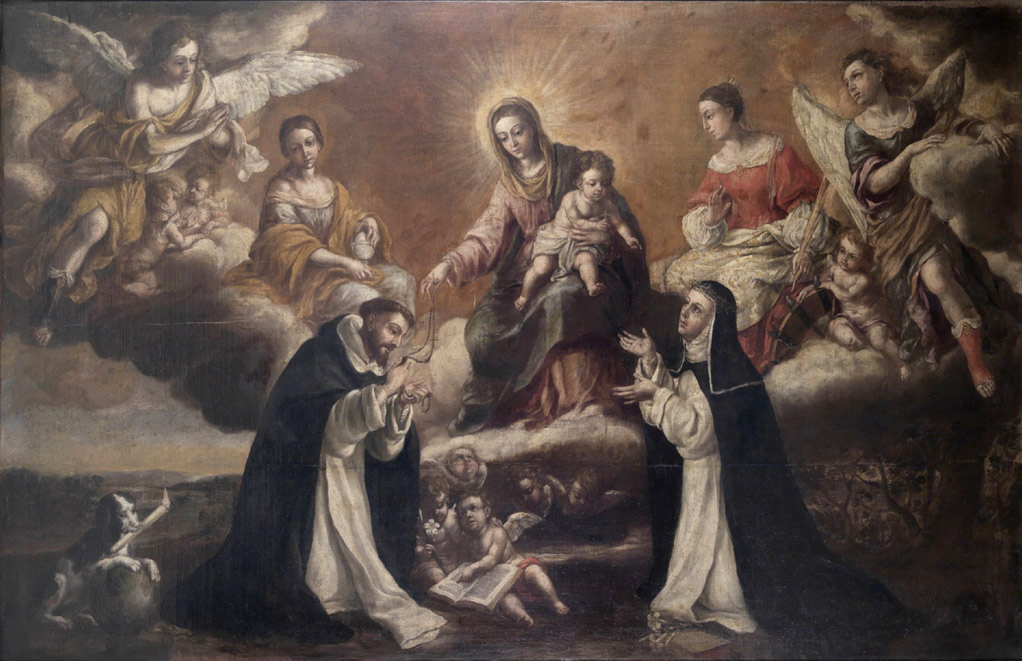
Lucas Valdés, Virgen del Rosario, Santo Domingo y Santa Catalina de Siena, c. 1700.

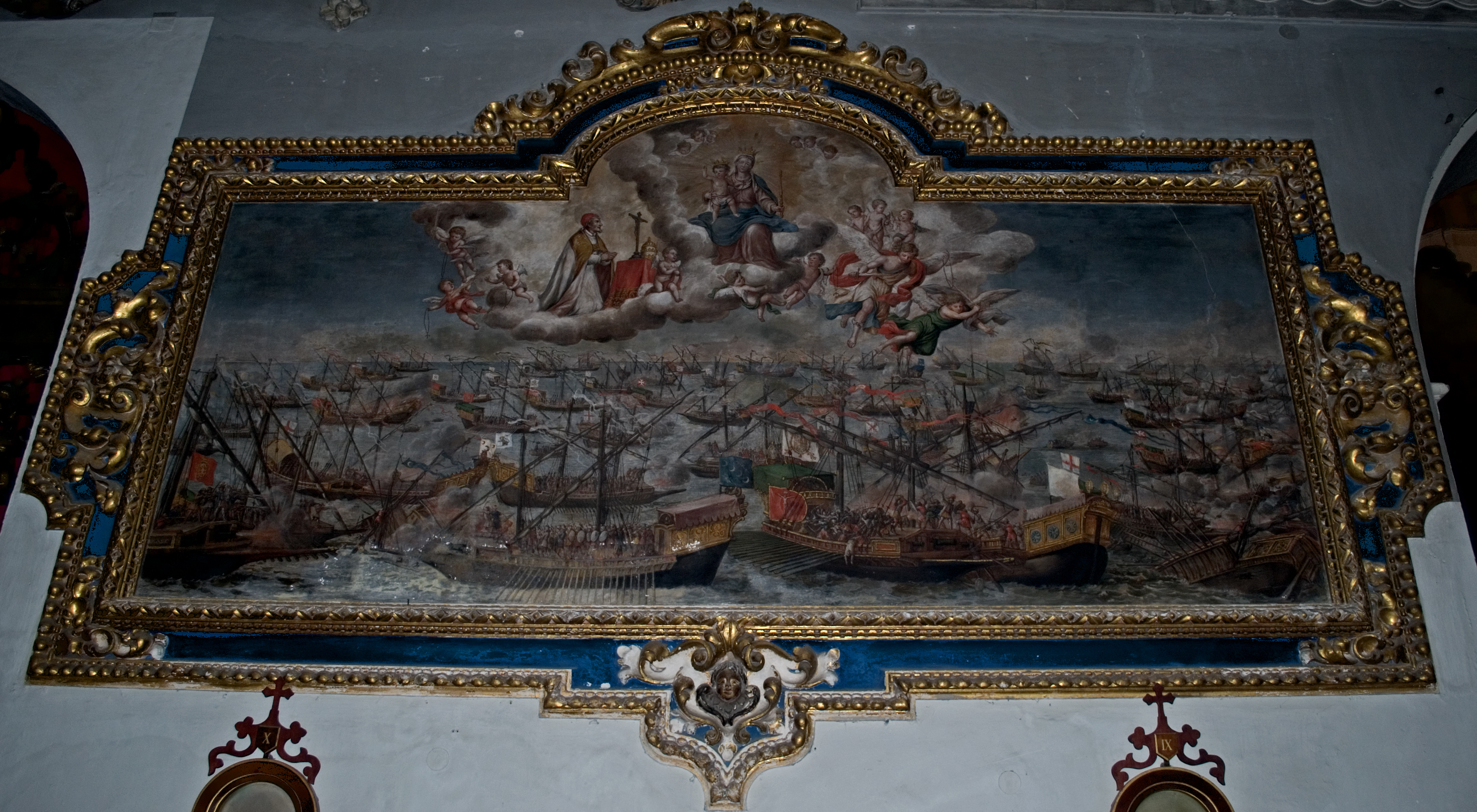
Lucas Valdés, La Virgen del Rosario protegiendo las naves españolas en la Batalla de Lepanto.

Lucas de Valdés Carasquilla (March 1661 – 23 February 1724) was a Spanish painter and engraver of the Baroque period, active in Seville.

He was the son of Juan de Valdés Leal and Isabella Carasquilla. He was born at Seville, and at the age of eleven he engraved four plates which are to be found in Fiestas de Seville a la canonización de San Fernando and form emblematic allusions to the virtues of that Saint. He became mathematical master of the Marine College at Cádiz, but continued the exercise of the pencil and graver until his death there. He also painted pictures of Saints and portraits, several of which he engraved; among them were the portraits of Father Francisca Tamariz and of the philanthropist Manara, one of his prominent painting was the Spanish victory in the Battle of Lepanto. His son Juan was also an engraver.

== Works ==
Title	Made	Location
La exaltación de la Cruz	about 1685-1690	Private collection (Vitoria) )
La apoteosis de San Fernando	around 1686-1689	Iglesia del Hospital de los Venerables (Seville)
San Fernando ante la Virgen de la Antigua	around 1686-1689	Iglesia del Hospital de los Venerables (Seville)
San Fernando entregando la mezquita mayor de Sevilla al Infante Arzobispo don Felipe	around 1686-1689	Iglesia del Hospital de los Venerables (Seville)
Sansón y el león (Samson and the Lion)	around 1686-1689	Private Collection (Madrid)
Abraham y Melquisedec (Abraham and Melchisedec)	around 1686-1689	Private collection (Madrid)
Llegada de sacerdotes peregrinos al Hospital de los Venerables	about 1690	Hospital de los Venerables (Seville)
Asistencia a los sacerdotes en la enfermería del Hospital de los Venerables	around 1690	Hospital de los Venerables (Seville)
Santa Gertrudis la Magna (Saint Gertrude the Great)	around 1690-1695	Iglesia del Real Monasterio de San Clemente (Seville)
El pintor Apeles y Alejandro Magno {Painters Apelles and Alexander the Great)	1693	Private collection (Madrid)
Bautismo de Cristo	around 1690-1700	Iglesia del Hospital de los Venerables (Seville)
El Niño Jesús entre los doctores	around 1690-1700	Iglesia del Hospital de los Venerables (Seville)
Cristo bautizando a la Magdalena	around 1690-1700	Iglesia del Hospital de los Venerables (Seville)
La curación del paralítico	around 1690-1700	Iglesia del Hospital de los Venerables (Seville)
Presentación de Cristo en el Templo	around 1695-1700	Hospital de los Venerables (Seville)
Inmaculada Concepción (pintada sobre mármol); Immaculate Conception	around 1695-1700	Iglesia del Hospital de los Venerables (Seville)
Santa Inés	around 1695-1700	Iglesia del Hospital de los Venerables (Seville)
San Esteban; Saint Stephen	around 1695-1700	Iglesia del Hospital de los Venerables (Seville)
San Vicente; Saint Vincent	around 1695-1700	Iglesia del Hospital de los Venerables (Seville)
San Agustín; Saint Augustine	around 1695-1700	Iglesia del Hospital de los Venerables (Seville)
San Ambrosio; Saint Ambrose	around 1695-1700	Iglesia del Hospital de los Venerables (Seville)
San Gregorio Magno; Saint Gregory the Great	around 1695-1700	Iglesia del Hospital de los Venerables (Seville)
San Joaquín; Saint Joachim	around 1695-1700	Iglesia del Hospital de los Venerables (Seville)
San Lorenzo; Saint Lawrence	around 1695-1700	Iglesia del Hospital de los Venerables (Seville)
San Nicolás; Saint Nicholas	around 1695-1700	Iglesia del Hospital de los Venerables (Seville)
San Pablo; Saint Paul	around 1695-1700	Iglesia del Hospital de los Venerables (Seville)
Santa Mártir	around 1695-1700	Iglesia del Hospital de los Venerables (Seville)
Santo Obispo	around 1695-1700	Iglesia del Hospital de los Venerables (Seville)
Cristo y la Virgen entregando los atributos a San Nicolás obispo de Bari	around 1690-1700	Iglesia del Hospital de la Sanfre (Seville)
Virgen de los Reyes	around 1695-1700	San Sebastián church. Marchena (Seville)
Retrato del Almirante don Pedro Corbert	1699	Hospital de los Venerables (Seville)
La última cena	around 1700	Iglesia del Hospital de los Venerables (Seville)
La Asunción de la Virgen	around 1700	Pozo Santo hospital (Seville)
Milagro de la caldera en el convento de Paula	around 1700	Museo de Bellas Artes (Seville)
Fuente milagrosa en el convento de Paula	around 1700	Museo de Bellas Artes (Seville)
Resurrección de niños en el convento de Paula	around 1700	Museo de Bellas Artes (Seville)
División milagrosa del moral en el convento de Paterno	around 1700	Museo de Bellas Artes (Seville)
Milagro de la conducción e las aguas con el báculo	around 1700	Museo de Bellas Artes (Seville)
Milagro de la navegación por el estrecho de Mesina	around 1700	Museo de Bellas Artes (Seville)
Milagro de las culebras en el convento de Turón	around 1700	Museo de Bellas Artes (Seville)
San Francisco de Paula lava los pies a los frailes de Turón antes de morir	around 1700	Museo de Bellas Artes (Seville)
Curación milagrosa del padre Fray Diego de la Mota	around 1700	Museo de Bellas Artes (Seville)
Quema del cuerpo de San Francisco de Paula por los hugonotes	around 1700	Museo de Bellas Artes (Seville)
Retrato milagroso de San Francisco de Paula	around 1700	Museo de Bellas Artes (Seville)
Terremoto detenido por la intervención de la imagen de San Francisco de Paula	around 1700	Museo de Bellas Artes (Seville)
La coronación de la Virgen. Coronation of the Virgin	around 1700	Convento de Santa Paula (Seville)
La coronación de la Virgen. Coronation of the Virgin	around 1700	Hospital de la Santa Caridad (Seville)
Alegoría eucarística Eucharistic Allegory	around 1700	San Pedro church, Seville
Imposición del palio a San Isidoro	around 1705-1710	Seville Cathedral
Sansón derrota a los filisteos	around 1705-1710	Private collection (Barcelona)
Dalila entrega a Sansón a los filisteos	around 1705-1710	Private collection (Barcelona)
David danzando ante el Arca de la Alianza	around 1706	San Isidoro church (Seville)
David y Achimelec	around 1706	San Isidoro church (Seville)
Alegoría del Triunfo de la Eucaristía	around 1706	San Isidoro church (Seville)
San Miguel Arcángel; Saint Michael the Archangel	around 1710	Colección particular (Seville)
Virgen del Rosario; Virgin of the Rosary	around 1710	El Greco Museum house (Toledo)
David y el traslado del Arca de la Alianza	around 1710-1715	Iglesia de la Magdalena (Seville)
La reconstrucción del templo de Jerusalén; The Rebuilding of the Temple of Jerusalem	around 1710-1715	Iglesia de la Magdalena (Seville)
La recogida del maná	around 1710-1719	Iglesia de San Juan de la Palma (Seville)
Altar de plata del Corpus de la Catedral de Sevilla	around 1710-1719	Seville Cathedral
Representación de los sepulcros de los Rivera en la Cartuja de Sanata María de las Cuevas	1714	Junta de Andalucía (Seville)
Alegoría de los dos caminos de la vida	around 1715-1719	Private collection (Sevilla)
Alegoría de la Institución de la Orden Tercera de San Francisco	around 1715-1719	Museo de Bellas Artes (Seville)
Santa Isabel de Hungría curando a un enfermo Saint Isabel	around 1715-1719	Museo de Bellas Artes (Seville)
Imposición por Santo Domingo del hábito de la Orden a San Jacinto de Polonia	around 1720	Museo de Bellas Artes (Cádiz)

=== Other paintings ===
Título	Fecha	Ubicación
Visión del nacimiento de dos santos gemelos	around 1690	Louvre, Cabinet des Dessins, París
La celebración de una misa	around 1690	Louvre, Cabinet des Dessins, París
Apoteosis de San Vicente Ferres	Hacia 1690	Louvre, Cabinet des Dessins, París
Monumento de Semana Santa de la Catedral de Sevilla	1695	Seville Cathedral, archive
David danzando ante el Arca de la Alianza	around 1700-1710	Museo de Bellas Artes (Córdoba)
David tocando el arpa ante Saul	between 1700-1710	Museo de Bellas Artes (Córdoba)
Moisés y el paso del Mar Rojo	between 1700-1710	Museo de Bellas Artes (Córdoba)
Mujeres danzando	between 1700-1710	Museo de Bellas Artes (Córdoba)
Victoria de Josué contra los amalacitas	between 1710-1715	Museo de Bellas Artes (Córdoba)
Quince personajes bíblicos e históricos (serie)		Courtauld Institute of Art, London
El Arca de la Alianza		Real Academia de Bellas Artes de San Fernando (Madrid)
Ecce Homo	1715	Spanish National Library, Madrid
