= Juan de Valdés Carasquilla =

Spanish engraver

Juan de Valdés Carasquilla was a Spanish engraver of the Baroque period, active in Seville. He was the son of the painter Juan de Valdés Leal (1622-1690), He specialized in engraving religious subjects for books of devotion.
