= Tuna (rapper) =

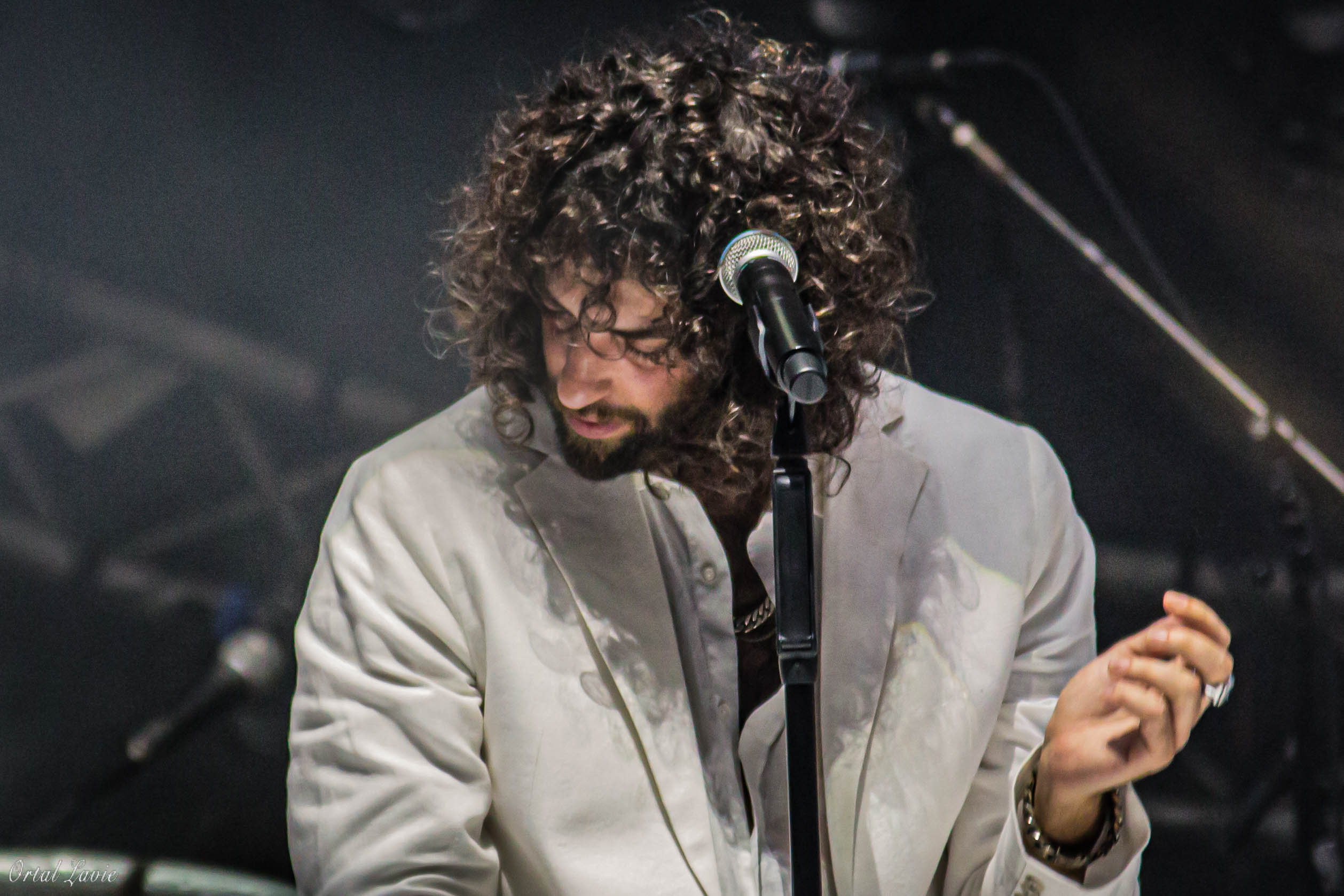

Background information
- Born: Itay Zvulun; May 13, 1984 (age 42); Petah Tikva, Israel
- Genres: Israeli hip hop
- Occupations: Rapper; singer; songwriter; actor
- Years active: 2001–present
- Labels: Anana; Vaad Havibe

Itay Zvulun (Hebrew: איתי זבולון; born May 13, 1984), known professionally by his stage name Tuna, is an Israeli rapper, singer, songwriter and actor.

== Musical career ==
Tuna was part of the Israeli group HaShevet. In 2006 they released their debut album.

In 2010 Tuna formed a band called Tunaman Jones with his friend Nir Danan. In 2011 their debut album was released.

In 2015 he released his debut album, This Too Shall Pass (Gam Zeh Ya’avor, Hebrew: גם זה יעבור) which saw praise.

In 2017 he released his second album, TunaPark (Hebrew: טונהפארק) to positive reviews. The album included the single-hits "Yud Aleph 2" and "Seharhoret" which saw success in the Israeli weekly and annual charts.

In 2019 he released his third album, Ve'Achshav La'Helek Ha'Intergalacti (And Now for the Intergalactic Part, Hebrew: ועכשיו לחלק האינטרגלקטי). The title and artwork pay homage to Ravid Plotnik's album, Ve'Achshav La'Helek Ha'Omanuti.

In 2021 he released his fourth album, Mizrach Paruah (Wild East, Hebrew: מזרח פרוע).

In 2025 he released his fifth and sixth albums together, Rap Metoraph (Crazy Rap, Hebrew: ראפ מטורף), and Rovim VeTaltalim (Guns and Curls, Hebrew: רובים ותלתלים).

Tuna at a concert, 2022

== Discography ==
=== Studio albums ===
- 2006: The Tribe (HaShevet, השבט), with HaShevet
- 2011: Tunaman Jones (טונהמן ג'ונס), with Tunaman Jones
- 2015: This Too Shall Pass (Hebrew: גם זה יעבור), solo
- 2017: TunaPark (Hebrew: טונהפארק), solo
- 2019: And Now for the Intergalactic Part (Hebrew: ועכשיו לחלק האינטרגלקטי), solo
- 2021: Wild East (Hebrew: מזרח פרוע, Mizrach Paruah), solo
- 2025: Crazy Rap (Hebrew: ראפ מטורף, Rap Metoraph)
- 2025: Guns and Curls (Hebrew: רובים ותלתלים, Rovim VeTaltalim)

=== Mixtapes ===
- 2010: Mixtape Baby (מיקסטייפ בייבי), with Tunaman Jones
- 2010: Mixtape Baby 2 (מיקסטייפ בייבי 2), with Tunaman Jones
- 2012: End of Rhymes Season (Sof Onat Ha'Haruzim, סוף עונת החרוזים), with Shotgunz
