= Ve'Achshav La'Helek Ha'Omanuti =

Studio album by Ravid Plotnik
- Released: June 30, 2019
- Genre: Hip-hop
- Length: 54:20
- Label: The Eight Note
- Producers: Yishay Swissa (also exec.); Eyal Davidi; Itay Zvulun; Nir Danan; Nimrod Bar; Yonatan Heffner; Ido Maimon; Yair Cohen Harounoff; Amit Sagie

Ravid Plotnik chronology
Shefel Ve'Geut (2017)	Ve'Achshav La'Helek Ha'Omanuti (2019)	Toch Kedey Tnu'a (2021)

Ve'Achshav La'Helek Ha'Omanuti (ועכשיו לחלק האומנותי; "And now the artsy part") is the fifth studio album by the Israeli rapper Ravid Plotnik, also known as Nechi Nech, released on June 30, 2019, by The Eight Note.

== Track listing ==
No.	Title	Writer(s)	Producer(s)	Length
1.	"Harbu Darb"	Ravid Plotnik; Eyal Davidi	Shekel	3:46
2.	"Shawarma"	Plotnik	Nir Danan	3:50
3.	"Emuna Iveret" (featuring Sima Noon)	Plotnik; Sima Bremy; Saleh Al-Kuwaity	Shekel	4:45
4.	"Medinat Mishtara"	Plotnik; Barak Cohen; Nir Danan	Danan	4:01
5.	"Elad"	Plotnik	Sagie	3:24
6.	"Samorai" (featuring Jimbo J)	Plotnik; Omer Havron; Itay Zvulun	Danan; Tuna	6:05
7.	"Olam U'mlo'o"	Plotnik; Yishay Swissa	Swissa	6:04
8.	"Nitra'eh Ba'Gilgul Ha'Ba"	Plotnik; Yair Cohen Harounoff	Swissa; Cohen Harounoff	3:34
9.	"Yom Kippur Be'Kfar Sirkin"	Plotnik; Nimrod Bar	Bar	4:53
10.	"Slah Li Avi Ki Hatati"	Plotnik; Yonatan Ne'eman; Swissa	Swissa; Young Heffner	5:41
11.	"Nana"	Plotnik; Swissa	Swissa	5:20
12.	"Lema'ala"	Plotnik; Ido Maimon	Swissa; Ido Maimon	2:49
Total length:				54:20

=== Notes ===
- "Harbu Darb" contains a sample from "November" by Miri Mesika.
- "Emuna Iveret" contains a sample from "Dhub Utfatar" by Dudu Tassa and the Kuwaitys.
- "Olam U'Mlo'o" contains samples from "Mitoch Ha'Rega" by David Ma'ayan and "Ad Ha'Pa'am Ha'Ba'a" by Ehud Banai.
- "Slah Li Avi Ki Hatati" contains vocals by Berry Sakharof and sample from "Te'udat Zehut" by Buyaca.
- "Lema'ala" contains a sample from "She's My Baby" by Balkan Beat Box.

== Personnel ==
Credits adapted from Linktone.

Instrumentation

- Yishay Swissa – additional keyboards (tracks 1–12), keyboards (tracks 7, 8, 10, 11, 12)
- Eyal Davidi – keyboards (tracks 1, 3)
- Roei Fridman – percussions (tracks 1, 8, 11)
- Nir Danan – guitars (tracks 2, 12), bass (tracks 2, 6), Keyboards (track 6)
- Yakir Sasson – trumpet (tracks 4, 5), flute (tracks 4, 11)
- Amit Sagie – guitars, bass and keyboards (track 5)
- Itay Zvulun – guitars, keyboards (track 6)
- Amit Kechman – cello (track 7)
- Maya Blezitzman − cello (tracks 6, 8)
- Nimrod Bar − keyboards (track 9)
- Yonatan Ne'eman - keyboards (track 10), additional keyboards (tracks 12)

Technical

- Naor Ben Meir − mixing, recording
- Yishay Swissa − recording
- Sidney Toledano − mastering

== Release history ==
Region	Date	Format	Label	Ref.
Israel	June 30, 2019	Digital download • streaming	The Eight Note	
Israel	July 4, 2019	CD	The Eight Note	
