= Jimbo J =

Israeli musical artist

Jimbo J ג'ימבו ג'יי
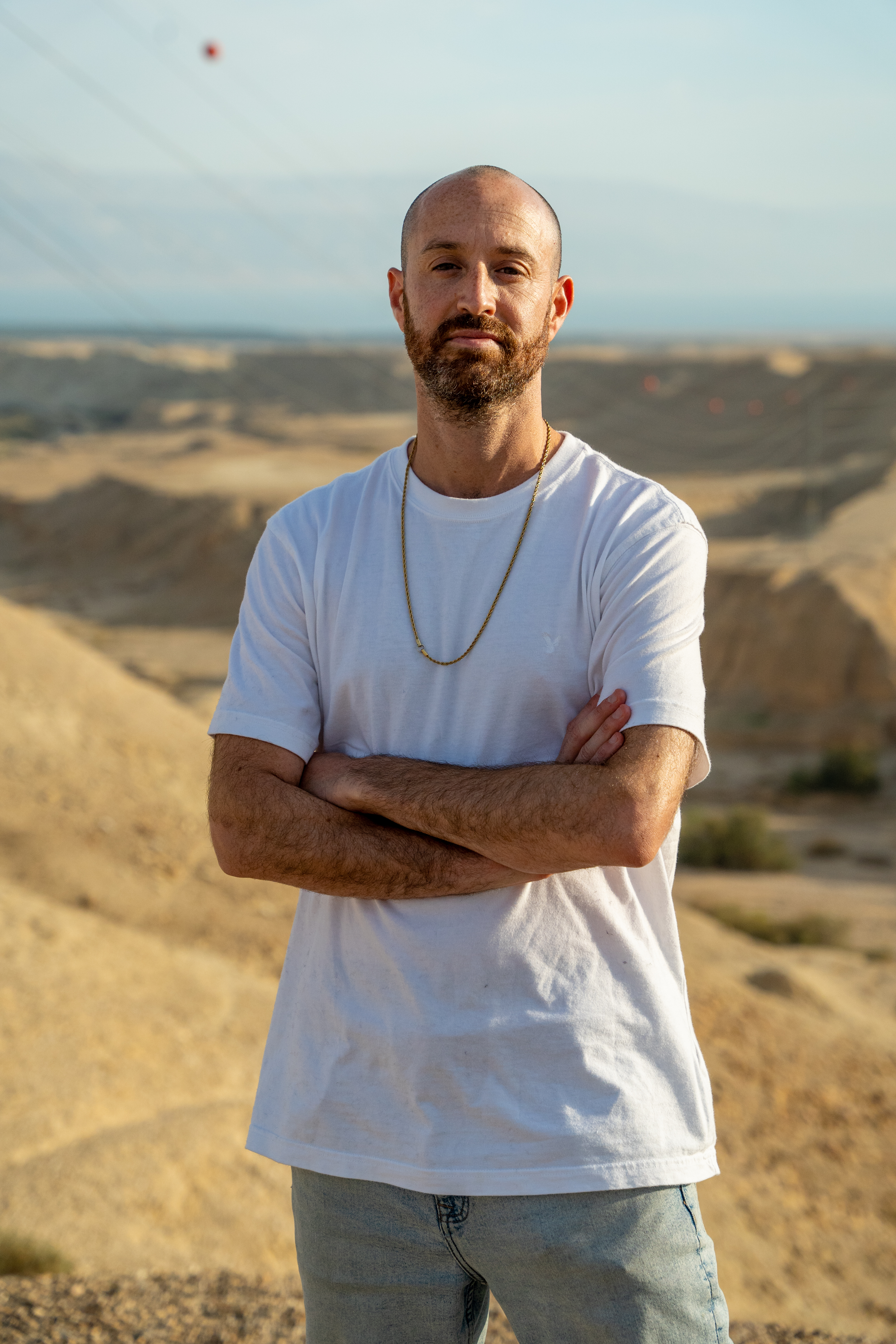

Background information
- Born: Omer Habron; 7 June 1985 (age 41); Rehovot
- Genres: Israeli hip hop; Jewish hip hop; hip hop
- Occupations: Rapper; singer; songwriter; actor

Omer Havron (Hebrew: עומר הָבְרוׁן; born 7 June 1985) known professionally by his stage name Jimbo J (Hebrew: ג'ימבו ג'יי), is an Israeli rapper, singer, songwriter and actor.

== Childhood ==
Havron was born and raised in Rehovot. The stage name "Jimbo J" was his nickname on the instant messaging software ICQ, which has stuck with him ever since. He served in the Israeli Artillery Corps, and later studied communications at Sapir Academic College, specializing in radio and podcasting.

== Career ==
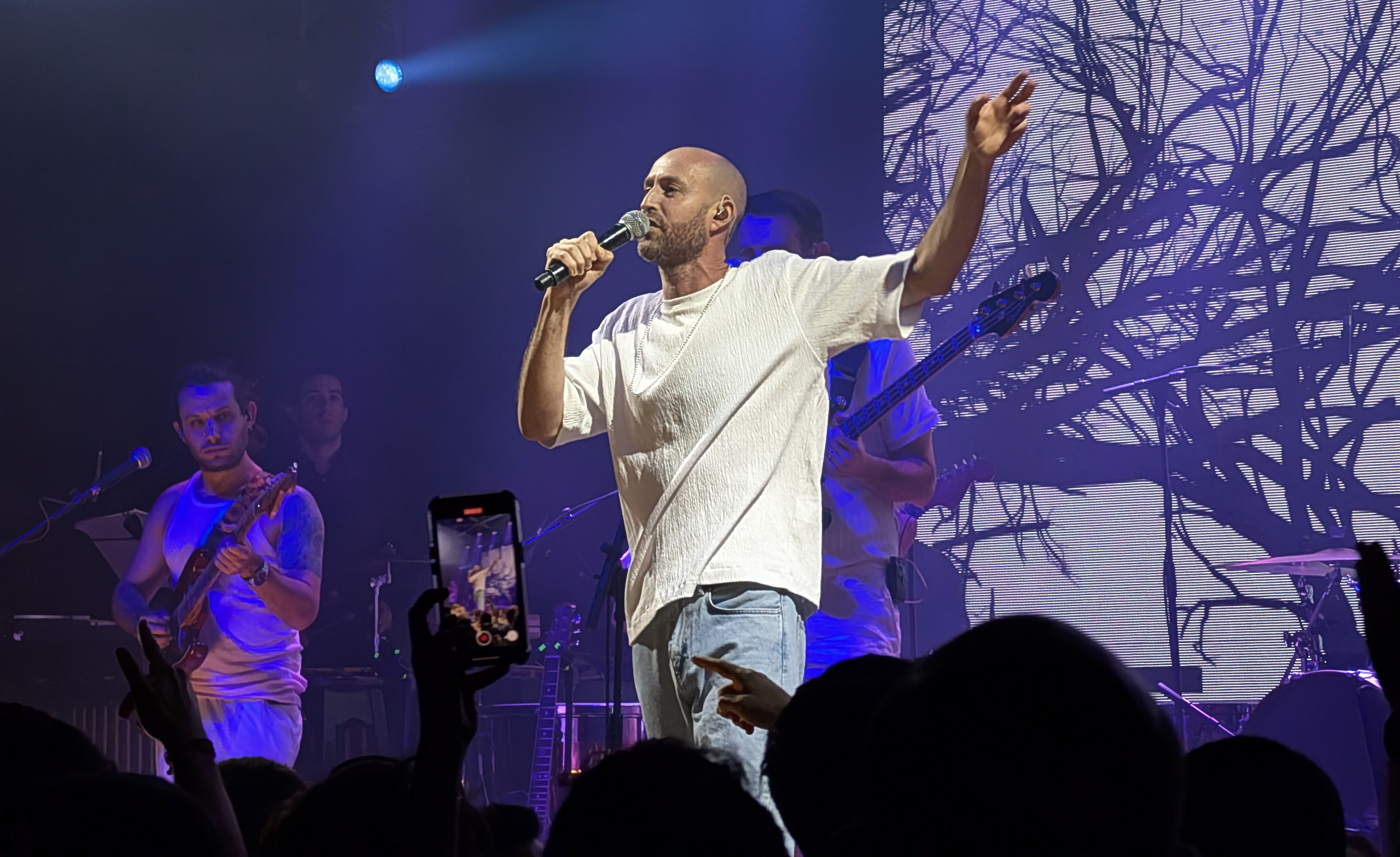
Jimbo J and the Spa Band in the launch concert for the album "Oh Wow," featuring the Street Orchestra and the Efroni Choir, Barby Club at Jaffa Port, August 2024.

=== Music ===
While in high school in 2007, Havron was a member of a rap group called N.O.D, which later became the trio "Victor Jackson". Havron performed as a rapper in the trio alongside Omer Mor and Amit Ulman until 2011, when the three began performing theater together on stage.

In April 2016, he launched a crowdfunding campaign on Headstart, aiming to raise 30,000 NIS to fund his debut album. The campaign was highly successful, raising approximately 155% of the original goal. The album, titled Let's Come Before (בואו לפני), was released on 5 June 2017. It featured the band Spa, which Havron founded for recording and accompanying live performances. The band members included Dekel Adin, Dean Prochtman, and Ziv Sobelman-Yemin. The album was produced by Omer Mor. The song "Asiti" (עשיתי) became a standout track from the album, inspiring dozens of cover versions online, including one by Eretz Nehederet. The album won Album of the Year from Walla Culture and Entertainment.

In July 2018, he released the song "The Fruits of Success" (פירות ההצלחה) with Amit Ulman, which narrates the story of an advertising campaign he was invited to join following the success of Let's Come Before.

In March 2019, he released his second album, What Rappers Want. The band members of Spa on this album were Roi Doron, Uriya Weitztum, and Itay Kfir. The album was musically produced by Omer Mor and Roi Doron.

In June 2019, he was featured on the song "Samurai" by Ravid Plotnik, from the album And Now For the Artistic Part. In November, he released a live album titled Brave Wild Horses.

On 27 May 2021 he released his third album, Port Workers. The album was produced by Roi Doron, and featured Rivka Michaeli, Ravid Plotnik, Shir Hadass Meir and Aya Zehavi Fiegelin. From this album the song "Cats" stood out, reaching the top of the charts, as well as the song "Suppositorias", and the song "Mommy I'm On It".

In December 2021 he wrote the song "A Song In Hebrew" for Academy of the Hebrew Language, in honor of Hebrew Language Day of that year. The song is performed by the Shalva Band, and Havron recites a spoken word excerpt at the end.

On 10 March 2022, he released the single "Just a Number" produced by Roi Doron.

In February 2022 he released the song "Stalbet in the Kibbutz" with the Israeli band Full Trunk. The song was very successful and received a lot of radio airplay, and was even named Song of the Year by Galgalatz, Radio 102FM and Kan 88. In July 2023 he won an ACUM award for the song, in the Song Achievement of the Year category.

In December 2023 he released his fourth album, Ah Wow. The album is produced by Roi Doron, and features guest appearances by Ze'ev Nechama, Alon Ader, Orit Tschuma, Avraham Legsa, Amit Ullman, Moriah Eknus, Alon Neuman, Oriya Weitzum as well as Roi Doron. The album deals with life in the Gaza Envelope and the love life of Jimbo/Omer.

On 13 January 2026, he released his fifth studio album, Everything is Fine (הכל טוב). The 11-track album features a blend of hip-hop and his signature social commentary, produced by long-time collaborators Omer Mor and Roi Doron. The album features notable guest appearances by veteran Israeli musicians, including Kobi Oz on the track "Otototo" and Haim Ulliel on "Bo'u Tir'u".

=== Theater ===
In 2012 he began acting in the hip hop opera This City at the Incubator Theater. In the play Havron played four characters: Detective Jack, Chucky, Barney Jerboa and the prisoner character. Havron co-wrote the play and composed it together with Amit Ulman and Omer mor, for which the three won the Golden Porcupine Award. The play closed in 2022 with the goal of turning it into a feature film.

Between 2014 and 2022 he acted in the spoken word adaptation of Shakespeare's Macbeth at the Incubator Theater in the role of Malcolm.

Between 2016 and 2022 he acted in the hip hop opera Dream High School at the Incubator Theater and played the lead role of Yoav. Havron co-wrote the play and composed it, and was part of the Golden Porcupine Award win for the composition.

In 2017 he acted in the play Job as part of the Israel Festival.

=== Television and film ===
In June 2020 he played the lawyer in the hip hop opera The Rise and Fall of Shem Tov Habi of the Kan public broadcaster.

In October 2022 he played Nadav in the comedy Who Has Heard of Hava and Navah. The series was directed by Guri Alfi and aired on YES.

In July 2023 the film This City starring him was released, a hip hop detective opera directed by Amit Ulman, based on the play they performed since 2012. In the film Havron plays the role of Jack, and he is credited for the lyrics and composition together with Amit Ulman and Itzik Peses who produced the film musically.

=== Radio and voice acting ===
In July 2021 he released the podcast The Best Army in the World together with Uriya Weitzman, and produced by the Incubator Theater. The podcast is a comedic docu-series, telling true stories from his military service in the Artillery Corps. A second season of the podcast was released in May 2022.

In March 2021 he participated in a celebratory Corona episode of the animated series End of the Road by the Kan public broadcaster, in which he voiced several characters including the Corona character of the chaser in the Kan 11 chase.

== Discography ==
=== Studio albums ===
- Let's Come Before - 2017 (with the Spa Band)
- What Rappers Want - 2019 (with the Spa Band)
- Port Workers - 2021 (with the Spa Band)
- Ah Wow - 2023 (with the Spa Band)
- Everything is Fine - 2026 (with the Spa Band)

=== Live albums ===
- Brave Wild Horses - 2019 (with the Spa Band)

== Books and plays ==
Havron co-wrote the hip hop operas This City and Dream High School which were released in the Incubator Theater's play series. Additionally, he published the song "Here is the Center" as a children's book.

== Personal life ==
In 2012 he was diagnosed with Hodgkin's Lymphoma cancer and underwent chemotherapy treatments concurrently with his performances in the play This city. Omer Havron is married to Shani, father to a daughter, and resides in Kibbutz Or Haner.
