= Raminta Šerkšnytė =

Lithuanian composer

- Born: 1975 (age 50–51); Kaunas, Lithuania
- Education: Lithuanian Academy of Music and Theatre
- Occupation: Composer
- Awards: Lithuanian National Prize for Culture and Arts

Raminta Šerkšnytė (born 1975) is a Lithuanian composer, pianist and Lithuanian National Prize for Culture and Arts laureate.

== Life and career ==
Šerkšnytė was born in Kaunas, Lithuania. From 1982 to 1994, she studied music at Kaunas J. Naujalio high school and with her aunt, Rymantė Šerkšnytė. From 1994 to 2000, she studied composition at the Lithuanian Academy of Music with Osvaldas Balakauskas. From 1997 to 2007, she studied composition abroad. After completing her studies, she worked as a pianist and composer. Her music has been performed internationally in Berlin, New York, Toronto, Moscow and at a number of international music festivals.

== Awards ==
- 1995 – Juozas Gruodis Composers Competition, first prize for the song Misterioso for two flutes and bass
- 2003 and 2006 – Lithuanian Composers' Union, twice awarded the prize for the best chamber work (2003 for Oriental Elegy for string quartet, 2006 for Almond Blossom for chamber ensemble)
- 2005 – Gold Cross of the Scene as the best theater composer
- 2005 – Lithuanian Ministry of Culture Prize for young artists
- 2005 – UNESCO 's International Rostrum of Composers for "Vortex" for solo violin and ensemble
- 2007 – Muses Mill Prize
- 2008 – Lithuanian National Prize for Culture and Arts for classical music and modern forms

== Works ==
Šerkšnytė's works include:

=== Orchestra ===
- De profundis, 1998
- Aisbergas, 2000
- Koncertas, 2002
- Kalnai migloje, 2005
- Mažojo princo pasaka, 2007
- Žara, 2008
- This too shall pass, for violin, cello, vibraphone and string orchestra, 2021

=== Solo instrument ===
- Pasakalija, 1995
- Fantazija, 1997
- Adagio, 1999
- Adieu, 2002
- Miražas, 2003
- Trys ostinato preliudai, 2007

=== Chamber ===
- Styginių kvartetas, 1994
- Misterioso, 1994
- Trys koncertinės pjesės, 1995
- Vizijos, 1995
- Žvelgiant į pasąmonę (Looking at the Subconscious) for flute and viola (1997)
- Koncertas šešiems, 1999
- Basso ostinato, 2001
- Rytų elegija, 2002
- Idée fixe, 2002
- Nuojautos (Presentiments) for flute, viola and 1~4 prepared pianos (2002)
- Sūkurys, 2004
- Miražai, 2005
- Migdolų žydėjimas, 2006

=== Vocal ===
- Saula, 2004
- Sense Six, 2004

=== Choral ===
- Aurei Regina Caeli, 1996
- Saulėlydžio ir aušros giesmės, 2007
- Sakura, 2018

=== For children ===
- Supasi lapai nubudinti, 1995
- Andante, 1997
- Vakaro atspindžiai, 1997
- Mažasis preliudas, 1998
- Baladė, 1998
- Šaltinėlis, 1998
- Dvi invencijos, 2003
