= Amit Ulman =

Israeli musical artist

Amit Ulman עמית אולמן
- Born: 11 December 1985 (age 40); Rehovot, Israel
- Genres: Rap rock; alternative rock; alternative hip hop; pop rock; pop punk
- Occupations: Actor; rapper; director; playwright; poet; singer; songwriter

Amit Ulman (Hebrew: עמית אולמן; born 11 December 1985) known professionally by his stage name Pedro Grass, is an Israeli actor, director, playwright, rapper and singer. He is the winner of the Golden Porcupine Award for Music and for writing the plays "This City" and "Dream High School". Ulman is one of the founders of Poetry Slam Israel.

== Biography ==
Ulman was born in Rehovot and grew up in the nearby town of Kiryat Ekron. As a teenager he was active in the Rehovot Youth Theater. He served in the IDF as a fighter in the Duvdevan Unit. He fought in the Second Lebanon War. In 2010 he began studying at the Nissan Nativ Acting Studio in Jerusalem. In 2011 he began working and creating as part of the Incubator Theater.

== Career ==
=== Poetry Slam ===
Ulman became interested in spoken word poetry in his youth after watching Saul Williams film "Slam". In 2010 he joined the first Israeli spoken word line, WORD UP, first as a participant and later as a co-producer.

In 2011 he initiated and produced the first poetry slam events as part of the Incubator Theater. At the same time, together with Eriq Aver and Nili Kopler, he began producing additional events across the country. The three founded Poetry Slam Israel. In 2012 he won the "Grand Slam" (the national poetry slam championship).

== Theater ==
In 2011 he began working as an actor at the Incubator Theater and acted in various plays.

In 2012 he staged the play "This City" at the Incubator Theater. Ulman acts in the play, and is also the director, writer and composer together with Jimbo J and Itzik Paztzati. Ulman won the Golden Porcupine Awards for directing the play and for writing the play. The play also won the Music Award and the Outstanding Ensemble Award.

In 2014 he staged "The Tragedy of Macbeth", a spoken word adaptation of William Shakespeare's text, at the Incubator Theater. Ulman acts in the play, and is also the director, translator and chief adapter. In 2016 he staged the play "Dream High School", Ulman acts in the play, and is also the director, and wrote and composed it together with Jimbo J and Omer Mor. The play won the Golden Porcupine Award for Outstanding Ensemble.

== Music ==
In 2003, at the age of 17, he co-founded the band A.N.D. together with Omer Mor and Omer Habron and other rappers. In 2009 the band changed its name to "The Victor Jackson Show".

In 2010 he began performing under the stage name "Pedro Grass" at various poetry events. In 2017 he released the book-album "Parentheses" which includes musical arrangements of spoken word poetry.

In 2019 he announced that he had parted ways with his stage name and that his next album would be released under his real name.

In November 2019, Amit Ulman released the single "Your Song" which will be featured on his upcoming second album.

== Voice acting ==
In 2019 Ulman voiced the character Hector Flapmaiker from the Israeli video game Piposh: The Audition.

== Television ==
In 2021 he began participating in Ha'Chanut She'Yesh Ba HaKol on Kan 11.

In 2023 his film "This City" will be released, an Israeli rap opera detective film based on the play of the same name.
