= Juan de Valdés Leal =

Spanish painter

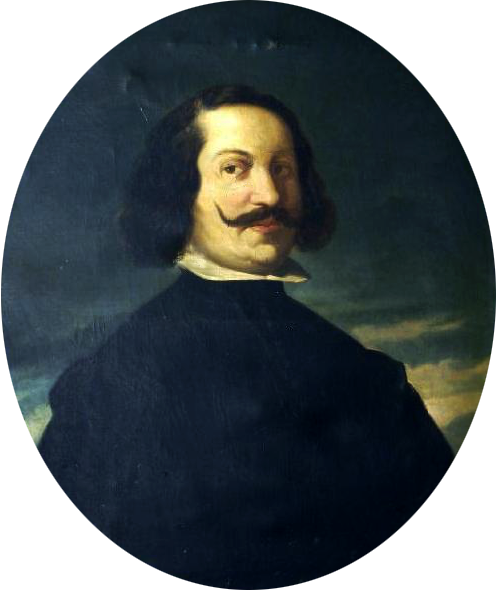
- Juan de Valdés Leal
- Born: 4 May 1622; Seville
- Died: 15 October 1690 (aged 68); Seville
- Known for: Painting, sculpture, architecture

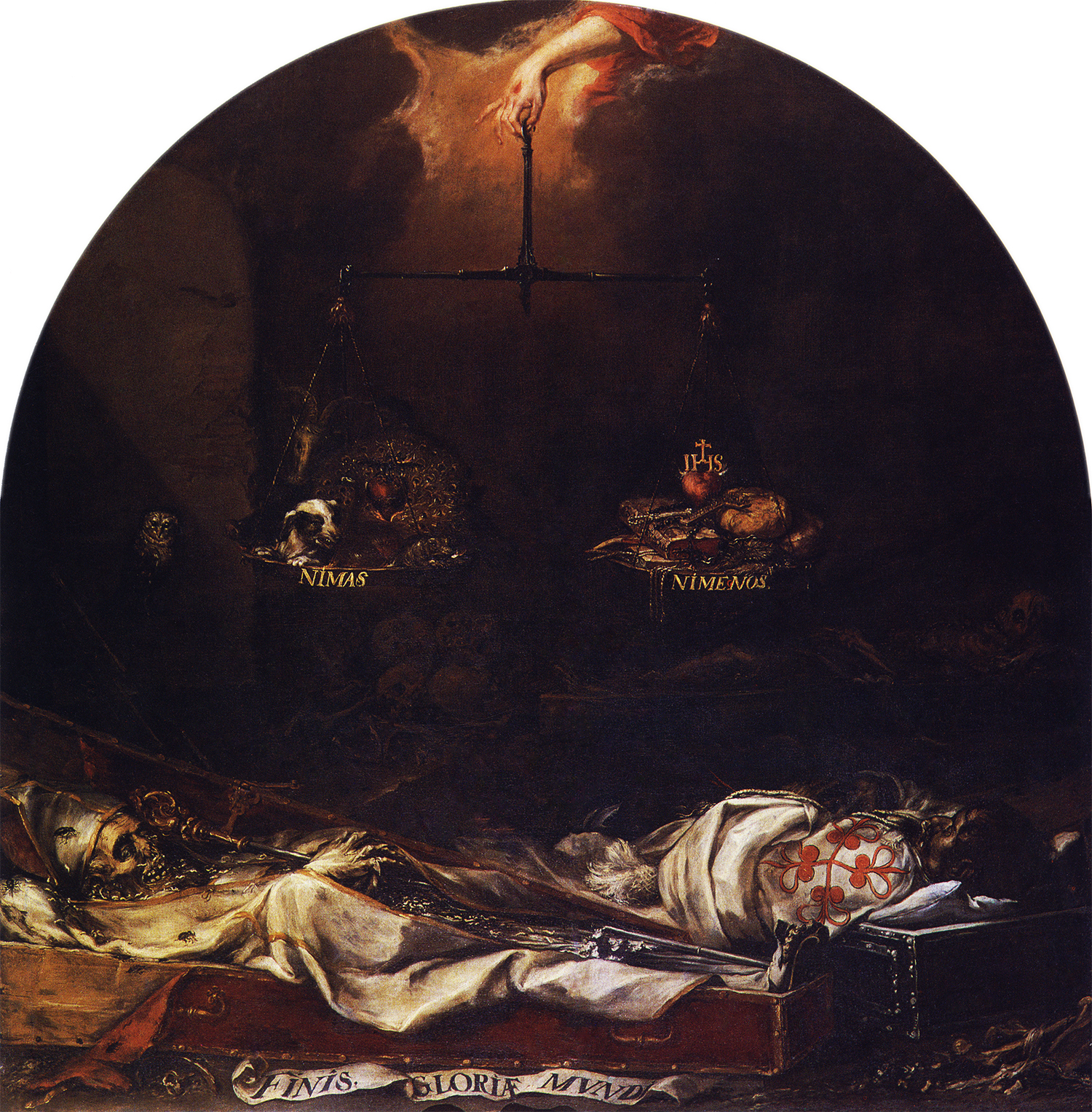
Finis gloriae mundi from 1672

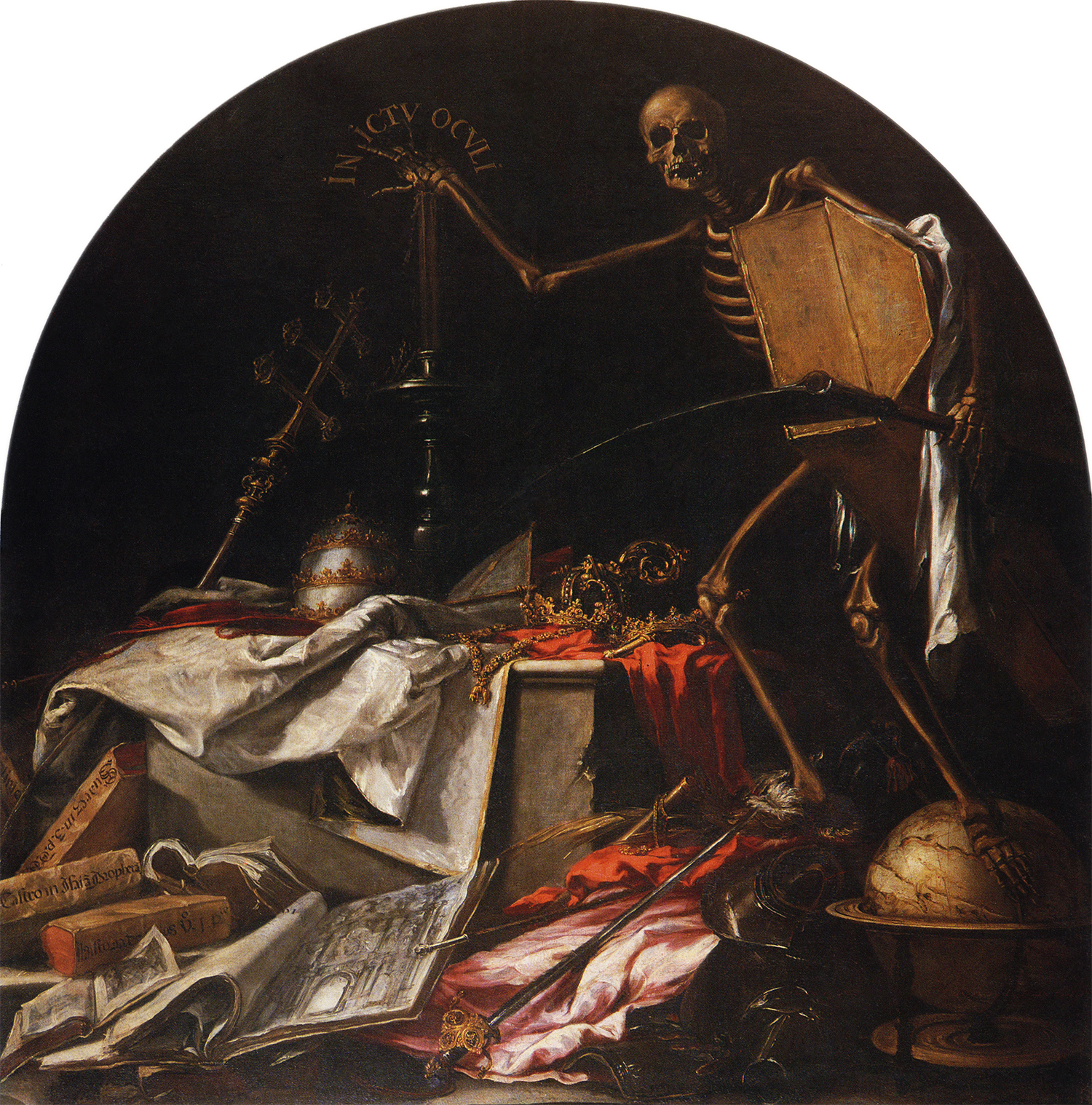
In ictu oculi from 1672

Juan de Valdés Leal (4 May 1622 – 15 October 1690) was a Spanish painter and etcher of the Baroque era.

== Career ==
Valdés was born in Seville in 1622. He became a painter, sculptor, and architect. By his twenties, he was studying under Antonio del Castillo in Córdoba.

Among his works are History of the Prophet Elias for the church of the Carmelites; Martyrdom of St. Andrew for the church of San Francesco in Córdoba; and Triumph of the Cross for la Caridad in Seville. He became friends with Bartolomé Esteban Murillo, who had a very different style; Leal tended to paint somber and dramatic subjects, while Murillo's style was peaceful and serene. After Leal returned to Seville in 1656, he and Murillo founded the Seville Academy of Art; the two also collaborated with sculptor Pedro Roldán on a large commission for the Hospital de la Caridad.

Several of his paintings treat the subjects of vanitas, transience and mortality. Two examples are In ictu oculi ("in the blink of an eye") and Finis gloriae mundi ("end of the world's glory"), painted for the Charity Hospital in Seville.

== Life ==
He married Isabella Carasquilla in 1647. She was also a painter. He and his wife had five children, several of whom were also artists: Lucas, Juan, Luisa, Maria, and Laura. His daughters specialized in portrait miniatures. Valdés died in Seville in 1690. His wife died in Seville as late as 1730. Maria died a nun in the Cistercian Convent in Seville in 1730.
