= This too shall pass =

Adage about the human condition

"This too shall pass" (Persian: این نیز بگذرد, romanized: īn nīz bugzarad; Turkish: Bu da geçer) is an adage of likely Persian origin about impermanence. It reflects the temporary nature, or ephemerality, of the human condition — that neither negative nor positive moments in life last indefinitely. The general sentiment of the adage appears in wisdom literature throughout history and across cultures, but the specific phrase seems to have originated in the writings of medieval Persian Sufi poets.

== Origin of the fable in West Asia ==
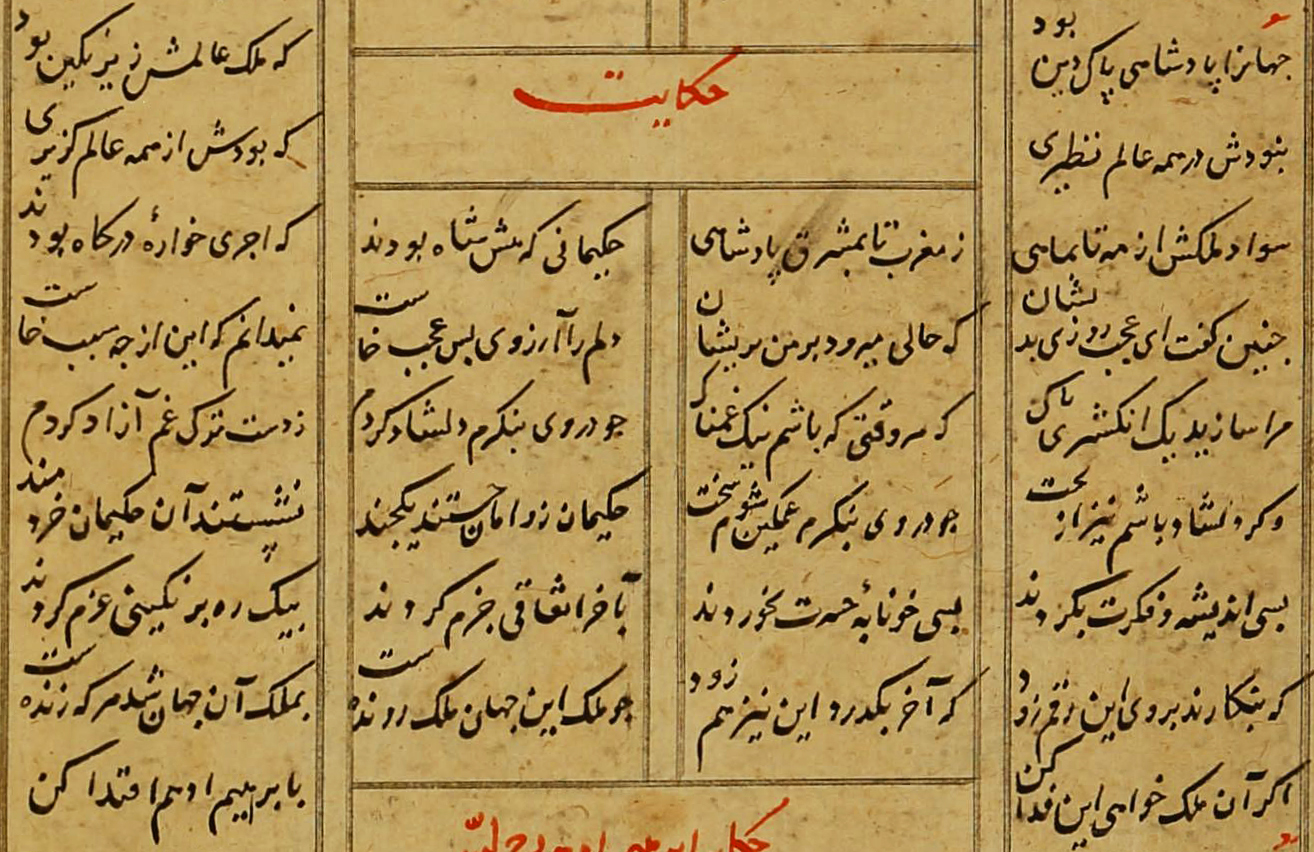
Persian poem The Padishah and the Ring in Farid ud-Din Attar-i Nishapuri's Ilāhī-Nāma from a 1458 manuscript (man. Jerusalem, National Library of Israel Yah. Ar. 1185).

The story likely originated in West Asia. It dates back to an Ottoman dervish with a "third eye" (open eye of the heart) who utters these words. Those who hear the words are so enchanted that they immediately run to the calligrapher Kazasker Mustafa Izzet Efendi. Thus, the words written by Kazasker Mustafa Izzet Efendi are embroidered on a ring and presented to Sultan Mahmud II (1785–1839).

But the tale is much older, and usually involved a nameless "Eastern monarch". It can be found in the 12th century works of Sanai and Attar of Nishapur. Attar records the fable of a powerful king who asks assembled wise men to create a ring that will make him happy when he is sad. After deliberation, the sages hand him a simple ring with the Persian words "This too shall pass" etched on it, which has the desired effect.

This story also appears in Jewish folklore. Many versions of the story have been recorded by the Israel Folklore Archive at the University of Haifa. Jewish folklore often casts Solomon as either the king humbled by the adage, or as the one who delivers it to another. It is sometimes mistaken for a Biblical passage.

In some versions, the phrase is simplified even further, appearing as an acronym גַּ זֶ יַ, only the Hebrew letters gimel, zayin, and yodh, which begin the words "Gam zeh ya'avor" (Hebrew: גַּם זֶה יַעֲבֹר), "this too shall pass."

== History of the fable in English ==
The fable is known in the Anglosphere primarily due to an 1852 retelling by the English poet Edward FitzGerald. Fitzgerald titled his poem "Solomon's Seal". In it, a sultan requests of King Solomon a sentence that would always be true in good times or bad; Solomon responds, "This too will pass away".

SOLOMON'S SEAL.

The Sultan asked Solomon for a Signet motto that should hold good for Adversity or Prosperity. Solomon gave him, "THIS ALSO SHALL PASS AWAY."

The tale had already been known to a lesser degree in England before FitzGerald; for instance, in 1813, the Scottish novelist Walter Scott recounted the tale in a letter to the British poet Lord Byron:

Your Lordship will probably recollect where the Oriental tale occurs, of a Sultan who consulted Solomon on the proper inscription for a signet-ring, requiring that the maxim which it conveyed should be at once proper for moderating the presumption of prosperity and tempering the pressure of adversity. The apophthegm supplied by the Jewish sage was, I think, admirably adapted for both purposes, being comprehended in the words, "And this also shall pass away."

Another early English recitation of "this too shall pass" appears in 1848, with the additional comment that things passing away does not happen because of the passage of time alone, but also because of mankind's typical oscillations "from good to evil, and from evil to good." In 1859, Abraham Lincoln also recounted this old story. In his speech he added "And yet let us hope it is not quite true. Let us hope, rather, that by the best cultivation of the physical world, beneath and around us; and the intellectual and moral world within us, we shall secure an individual, social, and political prosperity and happiness, whose course shall be onward and upward, and which, while the earth endures, shall not pass away."

== See also ==
- Deor, a 10th-century poem in which Deor laments his troubles, repeating the refrain "that passed away, so may this."
- Entropy
- Impermanence
- Memento mori
- Mono no aware
- Ozymandias
- Sic transit gloria mundi
- Ubi sunt
- Yorick
- Ecclesiastes
- All Things Must Pass, a song by George Harrison with a similar message.
