= Sic transit gloria mundi =

Latin phrase

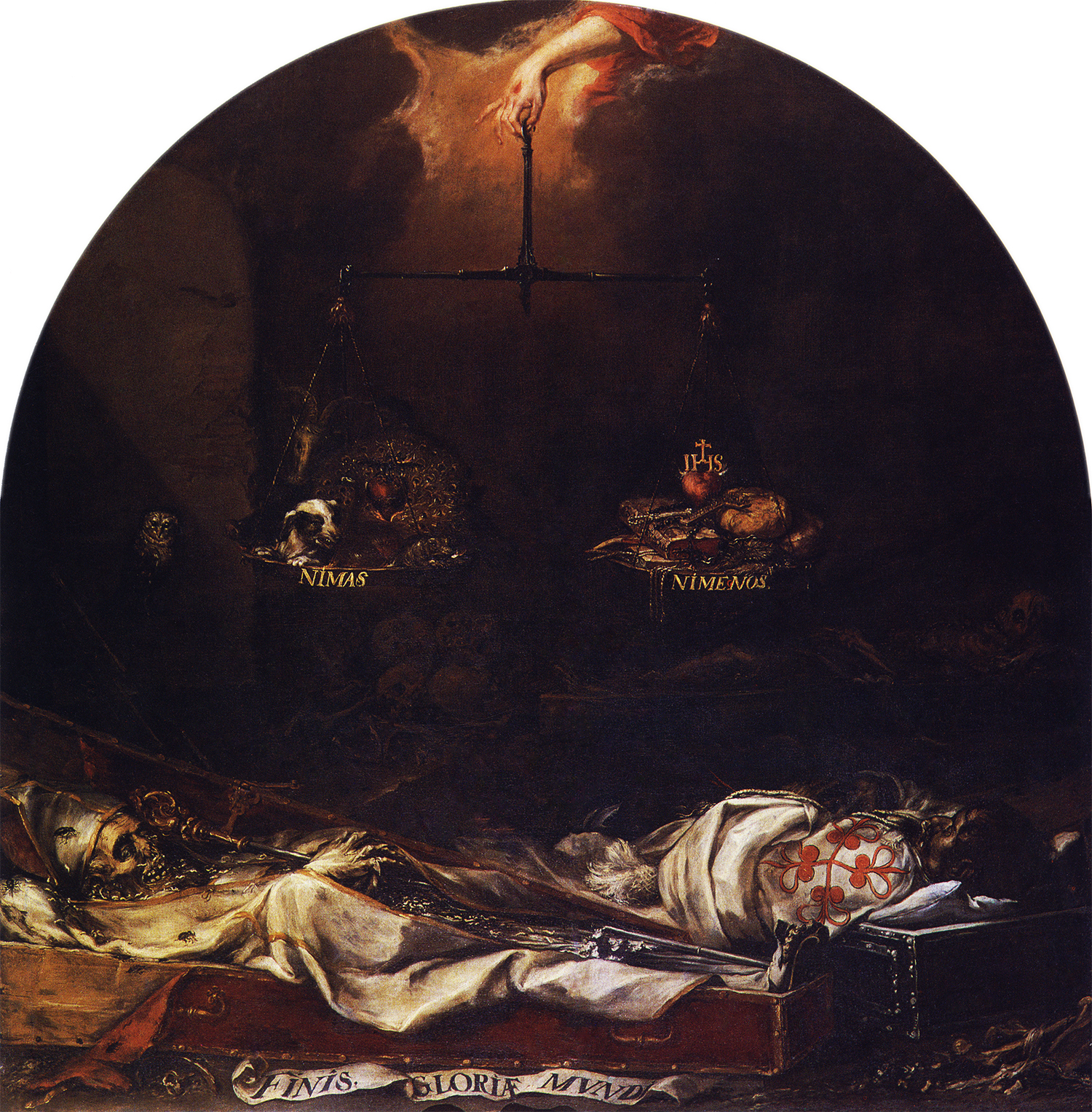
Juan de Valdés Leal, Finis gloriae mundi (1672). Seville, Hospital de la Caridad

Sic transit gloria mundi is a Latin phrase that means "thus passes the glory of the world". In idiomatic contexts, the phrase has been used to mean "fame is fleeting".

The phrase was used in the ritual of papal coronation ceremonies between 1409 (when it was used at the coronation of Alexander V) and 1963. As the newly chosen Pope proceeded from the sacristy of St. Peter's Basilica in his sedia gestatoria, the procession stopped three times. On each occasion, a papal master of ceremonies would fall to his knees before the Pope, holding a silver or brass reed, bearing a tow of smoldering flax. For three times in succession, as the cloth burned away, he would say in a loud and mournful voice, "Pater Sancte, sic transit gloria mundi!" ("Holy Father, so passes worldly glory!"). These words, thus addressed to the Pope, served as a reminder of the transitory nature of life and earthly honours.

A form of the phrase appeared in Thomas à Kempis's 1418 work The Imitation of Christ: "O quam cito transit gloria mundi" ("How quickly the glory of the world passes away").

== In literature and art ==
=== 1800s ===
- William Wordsworth's 1802 "Ode: Intimations of Immortality" deals with the disappearance of "the glory and the dream", and the end of the second stanza includes a literal translation of the line: "There hath pass'd a glory from the earth."
- An 1819 etching by British illustrator George Cruikshank is titled The Sailors Progress: Sic Transit Gloria Mundi.
- American poet Emily Dickinson's first published poem (in 1852) was titled "Sic Transit Gloria Mundi".
- Leo Tolstoy's 1867 War and Peace mentions this phrase as a proclamation used during the Freemasonry's ritual of accepting new members (in Chapter IV of the Second Part of Book II).
- Henrik Ibsen's 1867 Peer Gynt uses this phrase in act 5 as the last words Peer speaks to Dovre-Master (the troll king): "The best of luck; remember me to them. / If I can get free I'll follow your lead. / I'll write a farce of crazy profundity / And call it 'Sic transit gloria mundi'."

=== 1900s ===
- Robert Hugh Benson's novel Lord of the World (1907) ends with a reference to the phrase: "Then this world passed, and the glory of it."
- In Robert A. Heinlein's novel Starman Jones (1953) toward the end of Chapter 12 "Halcyon", there is this line of dialogue: "Sic transit gloria mundi—Tuesday is usually worse."
- During the finale of 1959's A Canticle for Liebowitz, Brother Joshua utters a variation on this line, "Sic transit mundi" while brushing the dust off of his shoes as he boards a starship designed to escape the Earth ahead of the world's second nuclear war.
- It is the last line spoken in the movie The Masque of the Red Death (1964) by the Red Death after he reveals he spared six from his plague.
- In the 1964 British comedy Carry On Cleo, Julius Caesar, played by Kenneth Williams, complains of motion sickness to his slave-girl, Gloria, saying "It's just a bit of sick transit, Gloria".
- In the film Foul Play (1978), a movie about a criminal manipulation of the papal transition, a character called Gloria Mundy is played by Goldie Hawn.
- A headline "SICK TRANSIT'S GLORIOUS MONDAY" from a New York Daily News front-page caption on a photo (1979) reporting an agreement to avoid fare increases on city transit services, making a multi-word pun on the Latin phrase.
- In the Soviet romantic fantasy comedy film Formula of Love (1984) a village blacksmith Stepan Stepanovich pronounces "Sic Transit Gloria Mundi" immediately translating it into Russian, though people wonder how can he know Latin.
- In the opening scene of the final episode of Babylon 5, season 4 entitled "The Deconstructions of Falling Stars," a person in the crowd welcoming President Sheridan and Ambassador Delenn can be seen holding a sign that reads "Sic Transit Gloria Mundi". The episode aired on October 27, 1997. In addition, season 3 episode 12 is entitled "Sic Transit Vir" a play on the phrase and the character at the center of the episode, Vir Cotto.
- In the 1998 film Rushmore (film) by Wes Anderson, protagonist Max Fischer introduces himself to his love interest, the teacher Rosemary Cross, with the line "Sic Transit Gloria. Glory fades. I'm Max Fischer." He repeats this latin phrase at the end of the film in his Vietnam war themed play, "Heaven and Hell", saying, "Sic Transit Gloria. Maybe we'll meet again someday, when the fighting stops."
- In the video game Alundra 2 (1999), the key priest, in the cutscene where Pierre gets turned in Dun Webb, uses the line "Sic Transit Gloria Mundi, Ghost ex Machina!"

=== 2000s ===
- In the feature film The Tracker (2002) directed by Rolf de Heer, a fanatical policeman says "sic transit gloria mundi", each word accompanied by him pointing a pistol where the heads of a group of Indigenous Australians had been minutes before. He was a significant participant in their slaughter and explains to the other characters that the phrase means 'So passes the glorious world.'
- The alternative band Brand New named a single from their 2003 album Deja Entendu, "Sic Transit Gloria...Glory Fades", referencing a quote from the 1998 film Rushmore.
- In the book series, Monster Hunter International (2007-) at Monster Hunter International's memorial wall for fallen monster hunters.
- The first-season finale of American TV series Yellowjackets is titled "Sic Transit Gloria Mundi". It aired on January 16, 2022.
- In the video game Overwatch 2 (2023), The character "Soldier 76" uses the voice line "Sic Transit Gloria Mundi."

== See also ==
- In ictu oculi, the companion painting to Finis gloriae mundi
- Memento mori
- This too shall pass
- Vanitas
