= Ravid Plotnik =

Israeli singer and rapper

Ravid Plotnik רביד פּלוֹטניק
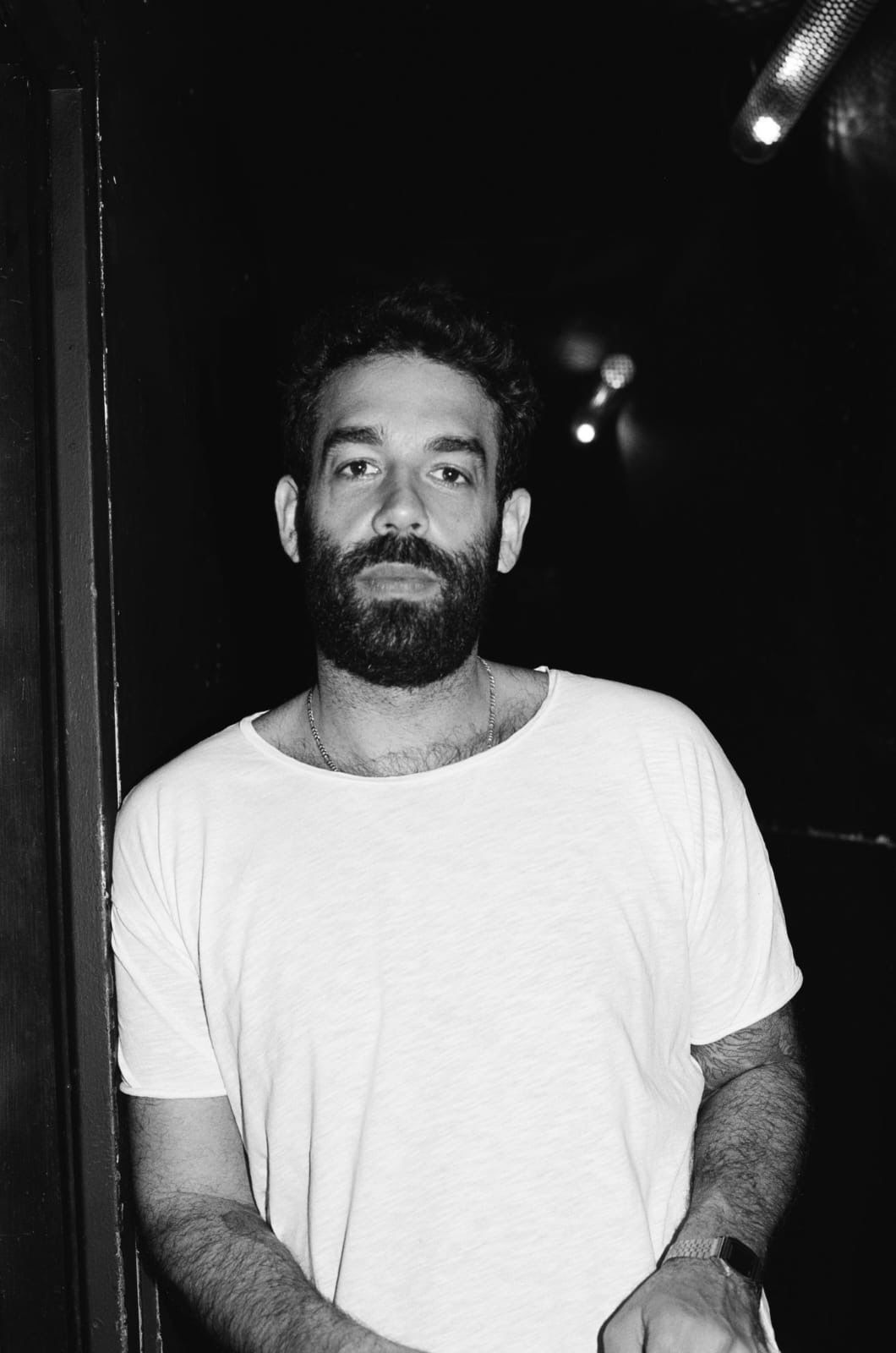

Background information
- Also known as: Nechi Nech; Nechi
- Born: Ravid Plotnik; 13 January 1988 (age 38)
- Origin: Petah Tikva, Israel
- Genres: Israeli hip hop
- Occupations: Rapper; singer; songwriter
- Instrument: vocals
- Years active: 2003–present
- Labels: Hi-fiver; The Eight Note

Ravid Plotnik (Hebrew: רביד פּלוֹטניק; born 13 January 1988), also known by his stage name Nechi Nech (Hebrew: נֶצ'י נֶצ', from Amharic ነጭ, white) is an Israeli singer and rapper.

== Biography ==
Ravid Plotnik was born in Petah Tikva, Israel, to a family of Ashkenazi Jewish descent. His parents are Uzi, a businessman, and Tali, a housewife. His older sister is named Shira. When he was 6, his family moved to Sha'arei Tikva. When he was 12 his mother died of cancer and two years later his family returned to reside in his hometown of Petah Tikva. At 13, he became interested in African-American music under the influence of his older sister, a singer as well.

Plotnik was inspired by his childhood hero Israeli rapper Subliminal. His stage name is derived from the Amharic word "Nech", meaning "white". Most of Plotnik's childhood friends in Israel were Ethiopian Jews, calling him so affectionately.

== Music career ==
When Plotnik was 15 he founded the band "Produx" with his friends Shmuel "Aritso" Yosef and Shimson "Chichu" Adama.

In August 2006 Plotnik joined the IDF, where he served as a quartermaster clerk for the Israeli Intelligence Directorate. In February 2010, three months after he discharged from the IDF, Produx's first album "Thia'at Ha'Metim" (Hebrew: תחיית המתים) was released. Later that year the band broke up due to disagreements between the members.

In August 2011 Plotnik released his first solo album "Tsadik Ehad Be'Sdom" (Hebrew: צדיק אחד בסדום, romanized: One righteous person in Sodom), which was ֽֽnot very successful.

In May 2013 he released his second album, "Bor Ve'Am Ha'Haretz: Sipuro Shel HaBoom-Shaka-Lak" (Hebrew: בור ועם הארץ: סיפורו של הבום-שאקה-לאק), which he toured around Israel with, making stops in Tel Aviv, Haifa, Jerusalem, Mitzpe Ramon, Ashdod, Rehovot, Rishon LeZion and more. This album placed him in the Israeli hip hop charts.

In 2014, Plotnik featured in the hit "Yehe BeSeder" (Hebrew: יהיה בסדר) by Strong Black Coffee (Hebrew: קפה שחור חזק), for which Plotnik wrote and sang the chorus.

July 1, 2015 saw the release of his third album "Bruchim Ha'Ba'im LePetah Tikva" (Hebrew: ברוכים הבאים לפתח תקווה) which deals largely with his childhood and youth in Petah Tikva. In March 2016, Plotnik won an Acum prize for best up-and-coming artist.

In May 2016, he released his single "Ani Kan Lishbor" (Hebrew: אני כאן לישבור), and was featured on "Olam Meshoga" (Hebrew: עולם משוגע) by the rapper Tuna.

In 2017 he released the first single "Kol HaZman Haze" (Hebrew: כל הזמן הזה) from the album "Shefel Ve'Geut" (Hebrew: שפל וגאות), composed in collaboration with Dudu Tassa. The track won first place in the Galgalatz Yearly Playlist and the album was chosen for an Acum prize in the category album of the year.

In May 2019, Plotnik released his album Ve'Achshav La'Helek Ha'Omanuti (Hebrew: ועכשיו לחלק האומנותי), which is the first not under his stage name.

In September 2021, Plotnik released his sixth album, "Toch Kedey Tnu'a" (Hebrew: תוך כדי תנועה), produced by Yishay Suissa.

In January 22, 2022, he performed at Menora Hall and was the first rapper in Israel to achieve this.

In 2024, he featured on "A+", a track with Noga Erez on her album, The Vandalist.

== Discography ==
- 2010: Thiyat Ha'Metim (With Produx)
- 2011: Tsadik Ehad Be'Sdom
- 2013: Bur Ve'Am Ha'Aretz
- 2015: Bruchim Ha'Ba'im LePetah Tikva
- 2017: Shefel Ve'Geut
- 2019: Ve'Achshav La'Helek Ha'Omanuti
- 2021: Toch Kedey Tnu'a
- 2025: Ha’Derech Le'Shvil Ha’Zahav
