= Abraham and the Three Angels =

Painting by Bartolomé Esteban Murillo

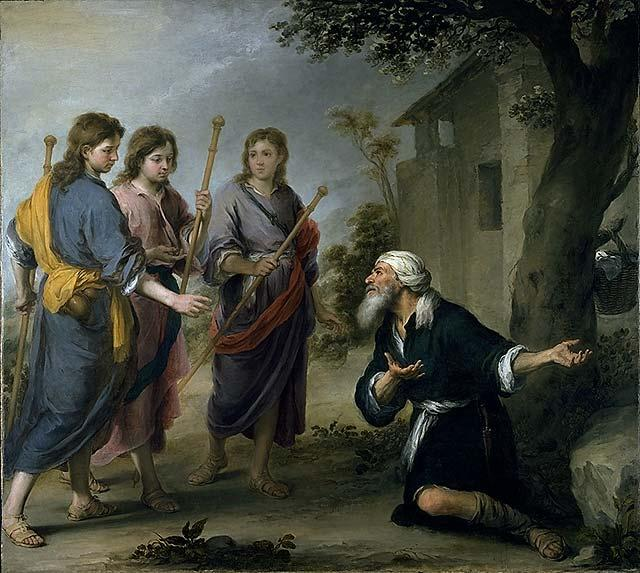
Abraham and the Three Angels (c. 1670-1674) by Bartolomé Esteban Murillo

Abraham and the Three Angels is a c. 1670-1674 oil on canvas painting by Bartolomé Esteban Murillo, now in the National Gallery of Canada in Ottawa, which bought it in 1948.

The work is one of eight paintings commissioned for Seville's Hermandad de la Caridad, to which the artist himself belonged and one of whose commandments was to clothe the naked. Four of those eight works remain in Seville (Saint John of God Carrying a Sick Man, The Miracle of the Loaves and Fishes, Moses at the Rock of Horeb and Saint Elizabeth of Hungary), whereas the Ottawa work and the remaining three were looted by Napoleon's army in 1810 (The Return of the Prodigal Son, National Gallery of Art; The Healing of the Paralytic, National Gallery, London; The Liberation of Saint Peter, Hermitage Museum).
