= Saint John of God Carrying a Sick Man =

Painting by Bartolomé Esteban Murillo

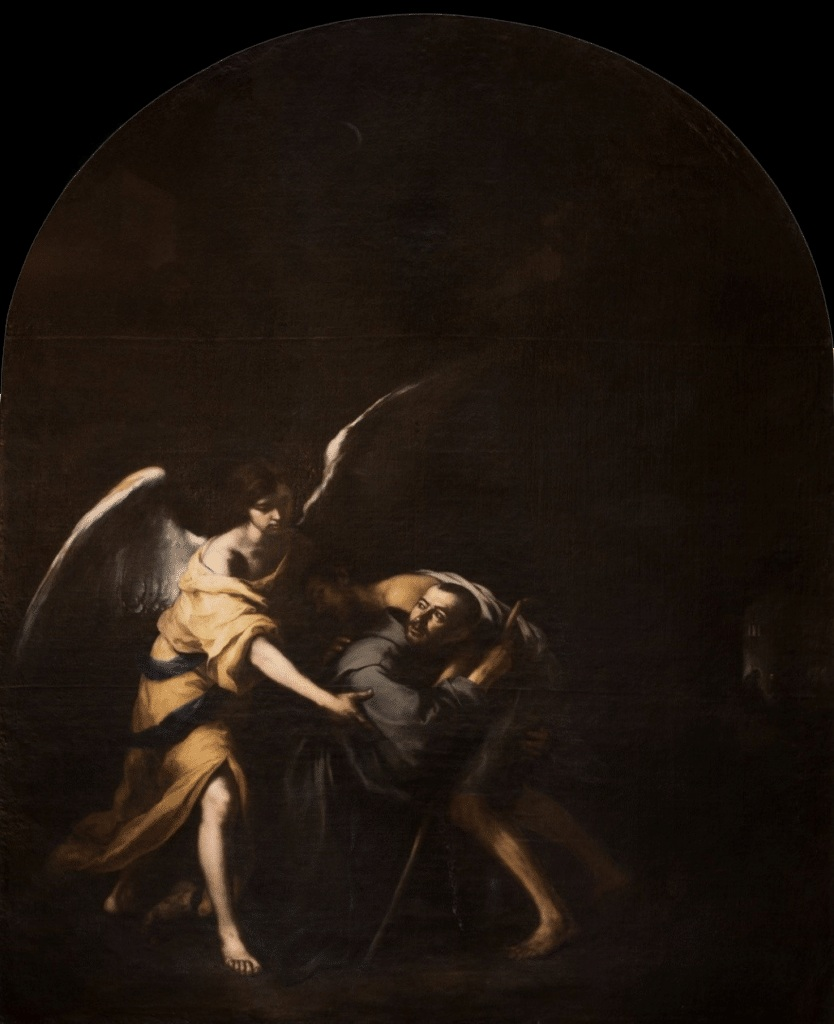
Saint John of God Carrying a Sick Man (1672) by Bartolomé Esteban Murillo

Saint John of God Carrying a Sick Man is an oil on canvas painting by Bartolomé Esteban Murillo, created in 1672. It depicts Saint John of God, with a sick man and an angel. It is held in the Church of San Jorge in Seville.

The work is one of eight paintings commissioned for Seville's Hermandad de la Caridad, to which the artist himself belonged and one of whose commandments was to clothe the naked. Saint John and three others of those eight works remain in Seville (The Miracle of the Loaves and Fishes, Moses at the Rock of Horeb and Saint Elizabeth of Hungary), whereas the other four were looted by Napoleon's army in 1810 (The Return of the Prodigal Son, National Gallery of Art; The Healing of the Paralytic, National Gallery, London; Abraham Receiving the Three Angels, National Gallery of Canada; The Liberation of Saint Peter, Hermitage Museum).
