= Liberation of Saint Peter (Murillo) =

Painting by Bartolomé Esteban Murillo

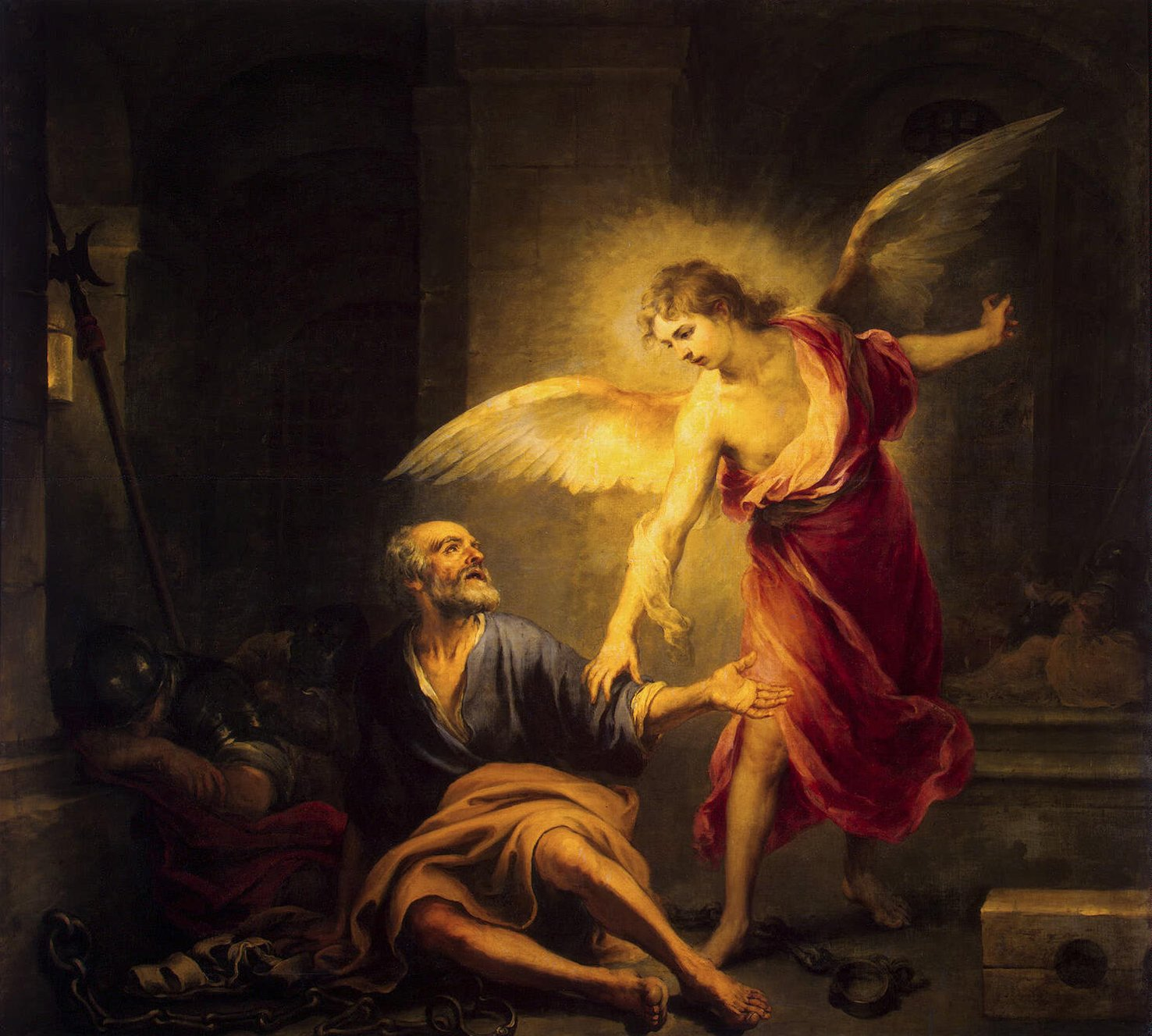
- Artist: Bartolomé Esteban Murillo
- Year: 1665–1667
- Medium: Oil on canvas
- Dimensions: 238 cm × 260 cm (94 in × 100 in)
- Location: Hermitage Museum, Saint Petersburg

The Liberation of Saint Peter is an oil painting on canvas of 1665–1667 by Bartolomé Esteban Murillo, depicting the scene of the liberation of Peter from Acts 12:5–17. It is now in the Hermitage Museum in Saint Petersburg.

It was one of eight works painted by the artist for the Hermandad de la Caridad (Brothers of Charity) in Seville. Only four of these eight are still in Spain, namely The Miracle of the Loaves and Fishes, Moses at the Rock of Horeb, Saint Elizabeth of Hungary and Saint John of God. The work in the Hermitage and the remaining three (Abraham Welcoming Three Angels currently in the National Gallery of Canada; Christ Healing the Paralytic at the Pool of Bethesda currently in the National Gallery, London; and The Return of the Prodigal Son currently in the National Gallery of Art, Washington) were all looted by Marshal Soult in 1810.

== See also ==
- Napoleonic looting of art
