= Christ Healing the Paralytic at the Pool of Bethesda =

Painting by Bartolomé Esteban Murillo

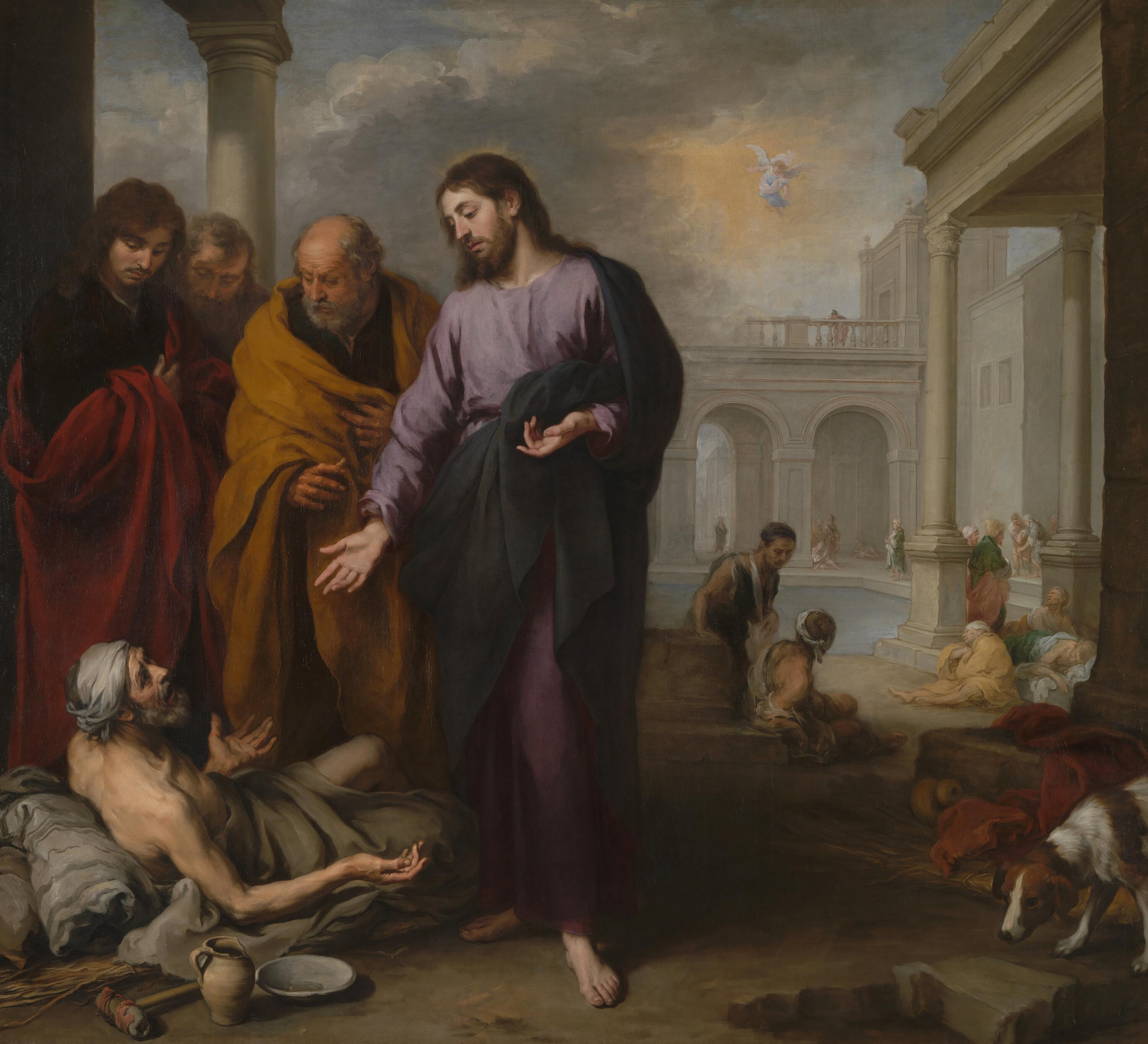
Christ Healing the Paralytic at the Pool of Bethesda (1667-1670) by Bartolomé Esteban Murillo

Christ Healing the Paralytic at the Pool of Bethesda is a 1667-1670 oil on canvas painting by Bartolomé Esteban Murillo, depeciting the eponymous miracle of Jesus recounted in the Gospel of John. It is now in the National Gallery, London, to which it was presented by the Art Fund, which had bought it for £8,000 the body had been given by Graham Robertson's executors. It had been in Paris by 1812 before being acquired by Colonel George Tomline and remaining in British private collections until 1950.

The work is one of eight paintings commissioned for Seville's Hermandad de la Caridad, a Catholic charity hospital, to which the artist himself belonged and one of whose commandments was to clothe the naked. Four of those eight works remain in Seville (The Miracle of the Loaves and Fishes, Moses at the Rock of Horeb, Saint Elizabeth of Hungary and Saint John of God Carrying a Sick Man), whereas the London work and the other three were looted by Napoleon's army in 1810 (The Return of the Prodigal Son, National Gallery of Art, Washington; Abraham Receiving the Three Angels, National Gallery of Canada; The Liberation of Saint Peter, Hermitage Museum).
