= The Return of the Prodigal Son (Murillo) =

Painting by Bartolome Esteban Murillo

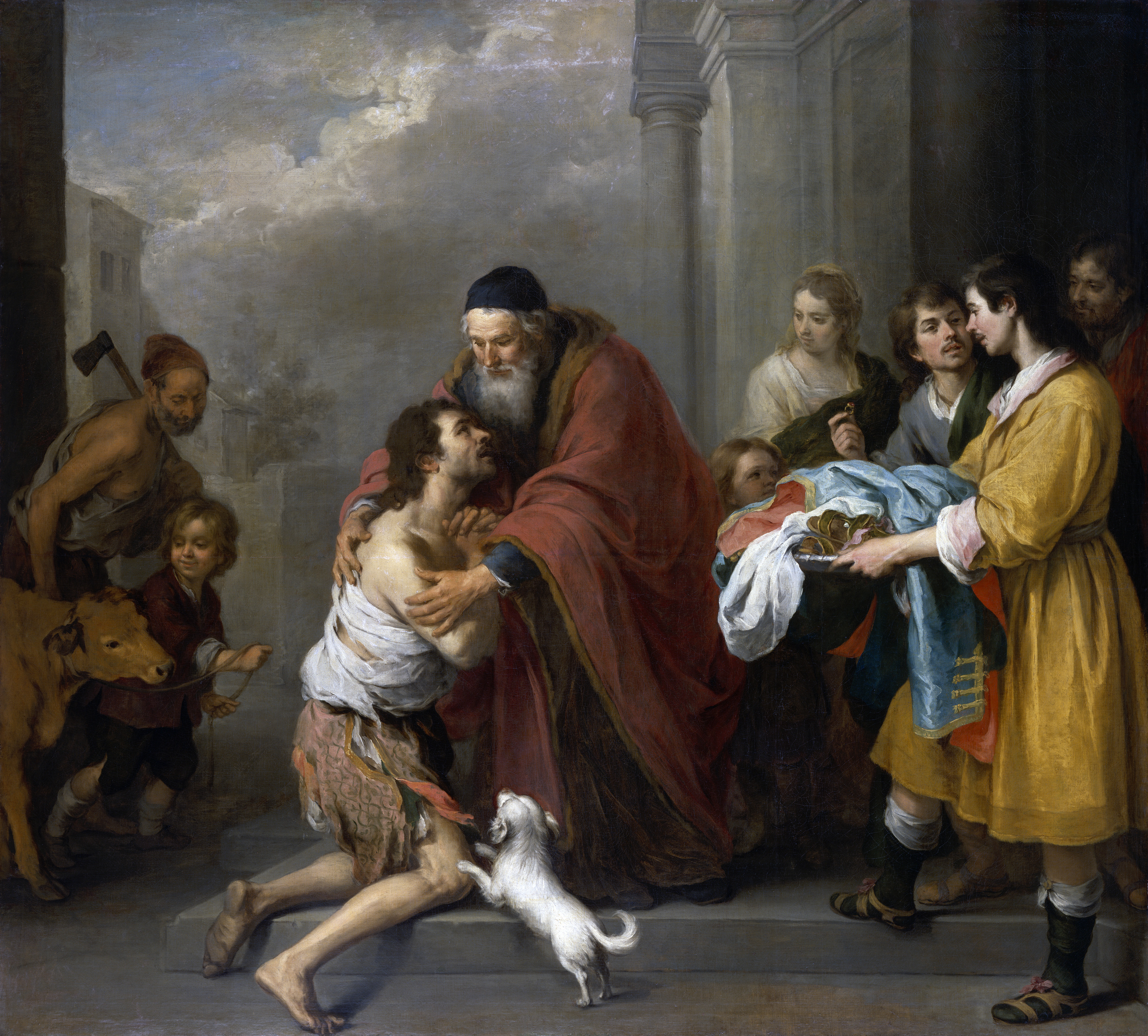
The Return of the Prodigal Son (c. 1667-1670) by Bartolomé Esteban Murillo

The Return of the Prodigal Son is a c. 1667-1670 oil on canvas painting by Bartolomé Esteban Murillo, now in the National Gallery of Art in Washington, D.C., to which it was given by the Avalon Foundation in 1948.

The work is one of eight paintings commissioned for Seville's Hermandad de la Caridad, to which the artist himself belonged and one of whose commandments was to clothe the naked. Four of those eight works remain in Seville (The Miracle of the Loaves and Fishes, Moses at the Rock of Horeb, Saint Elizabeth of Hungary and Saint John of God Carrying a Sick Man), whereas the Washington work and the other three were looted by Napoleon's army in 1810 (The Healing of the Paralytic, National Gallery, London; Abraham Receiving the Three Angels, National Gallery of Canada; The Liberation of Saint Peter, Hermitage Museum).

Murillo completed a six-painting series on the Prodigal Son (including a different Return), now in the National Gallery of Ireland.
