= St. Buenaventura's Church, Seville =

Church building in Seville, Spain

Coordinates: 37.389031°N 5.997309°W

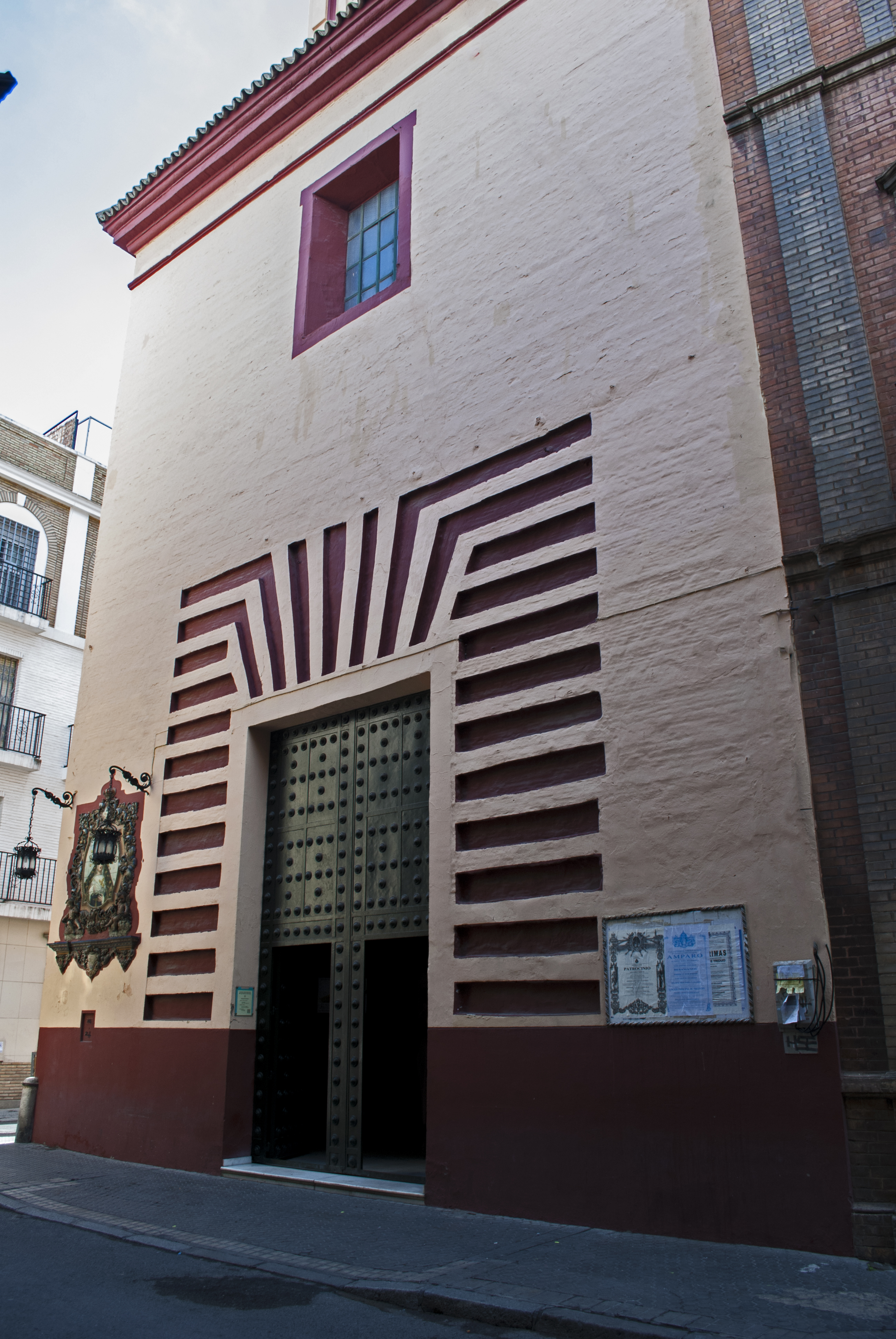
Facade of St. Buenaventura's Church.

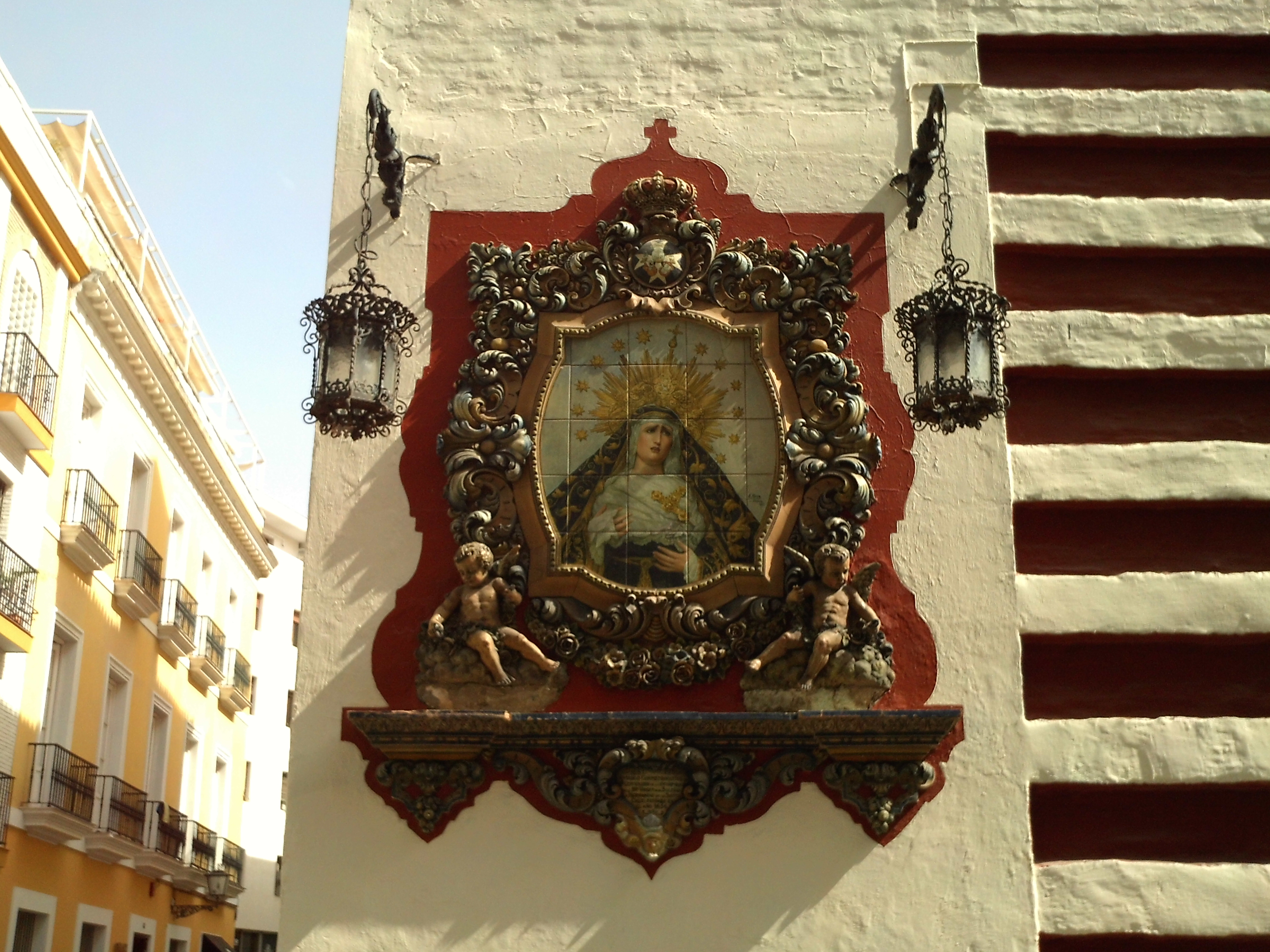
Azulejo image of the Soledad at the Church's facade.

St. Buenaventura's Church is situated in the calle Carlos Cañal (formerly calle de los Catalanos) in the Casco Antiguo of Seville, Andalusia, Spain. It was the church of the Franciscan College of San Buenaventura that was destroyed in the 19th century.

== History ==
Luis de Rebolledo (1549-1613), definitor general of Andalucia’s ecclesiastical province and provincial superior of the Franciscans, had planned the foundation of a college for theological studies separate from the existing Franciscan convent Casa Grande de San Francisco. In 1600, Doña Isabel de Sira, the widow of Andrés Corso de Casuche, protected the foundation of the College of San Buenaventura. She bought houses in the calle de la Mar, today calle García de Vinuesa. In 1605, the space wasn't enough any more and the meanwhile founded college moved to its final location on an area of gardens of the convent Casa Grande de San Francisco.

From 1626 the merchant Don Tomás Mañara de Leca y Colonna and his wife Jerónima Vicentelo, parents of Miguel Mañara, for his part founder of the Hospital de la Caridad patronized the college.

Originally, the complex featured two cloisters.

The church was designed in 1622 by the sculptor and architect Diego López Bueno (c. 1568–1632). The masons Juan de Segarra and Juan Bernardo de Velasco and the carpenter Felipe Nieto participated in its construction. The construction took place between 1622 and 1626. The decorative stuccoes were designed by Francisco Herrera the Elder and executed by Juan Bernardo de Velasco and Juan de Segarra. The decorative program of the church was designed by Luis de Rebolledo and by the Franciscan theologian Damián de Lugones. The decoration of the church was carried out between 1626 and 1627.

With the French invasion in 1810, the college was converted into barracks and its church into a stall. Many artworks were destroyed or looted. After the expulsion of the French, the compound was recovered by the Franciscans between 1813 and 1814 and renovated for 30.000 real. During the Trienio Liberal the convent's inhabitants were expulsed again and the buildings housed a museum of paintings and sculptures. Between 1824 and 1835 the Franciscans came back. The convent was confiscated in 1835, leaving the church in charge of a chaplain.

In the 1863, the nave and the chapels on the Gospel side were removed and at its place today's calle Bilbao was built. The nave contained the Puerta Reglar.

== Representations from the life of St. Bonaventure painting cycle ==
The church once showed a cycle of eight paintings with scenes from the life of Saint Bonaventure by Francisco Herrera the Elder and Francisco de Zurbarán, they are now spread over Spain, France, Germany and the USA. One painting was destroyed in World War II. A ninth painting, the Last Communion of Saint Bonaventure – today in the Palazzo Bianco, Genoa – is today attributed to the workshop of Francisco de Zurbarán. It is assumed that it has been in the church's sacristy.

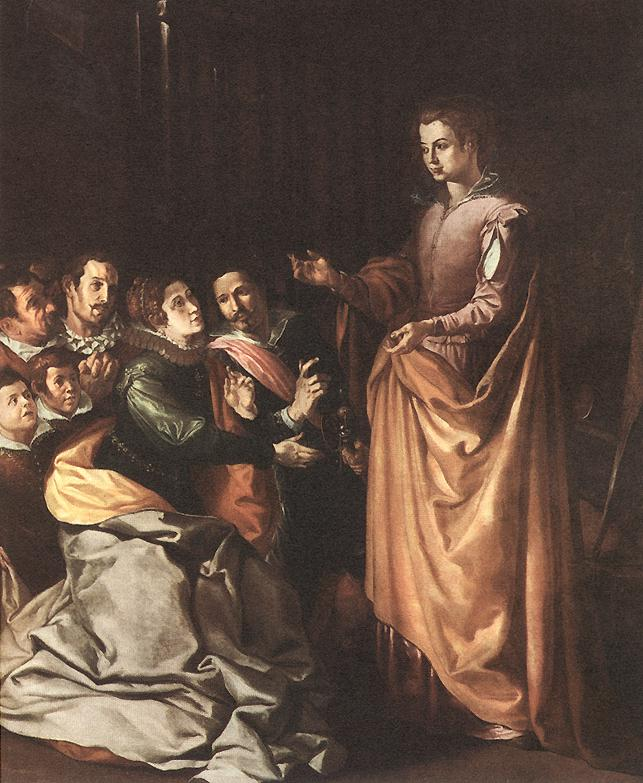
1, Herrera, The Apparition of Saint Catherine to the Family of Saint Bonaventure, Bob Jones University, Greenville, USA

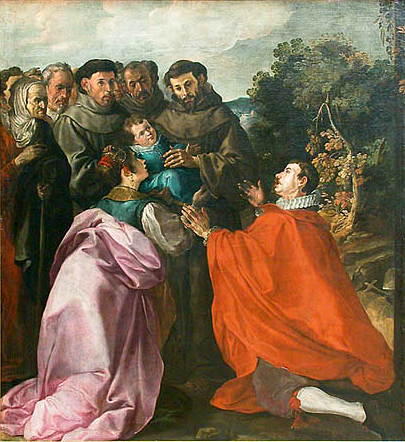
2, Herrera, The Young Bonaventure Cured by Saint Francis, Louvre, Paris

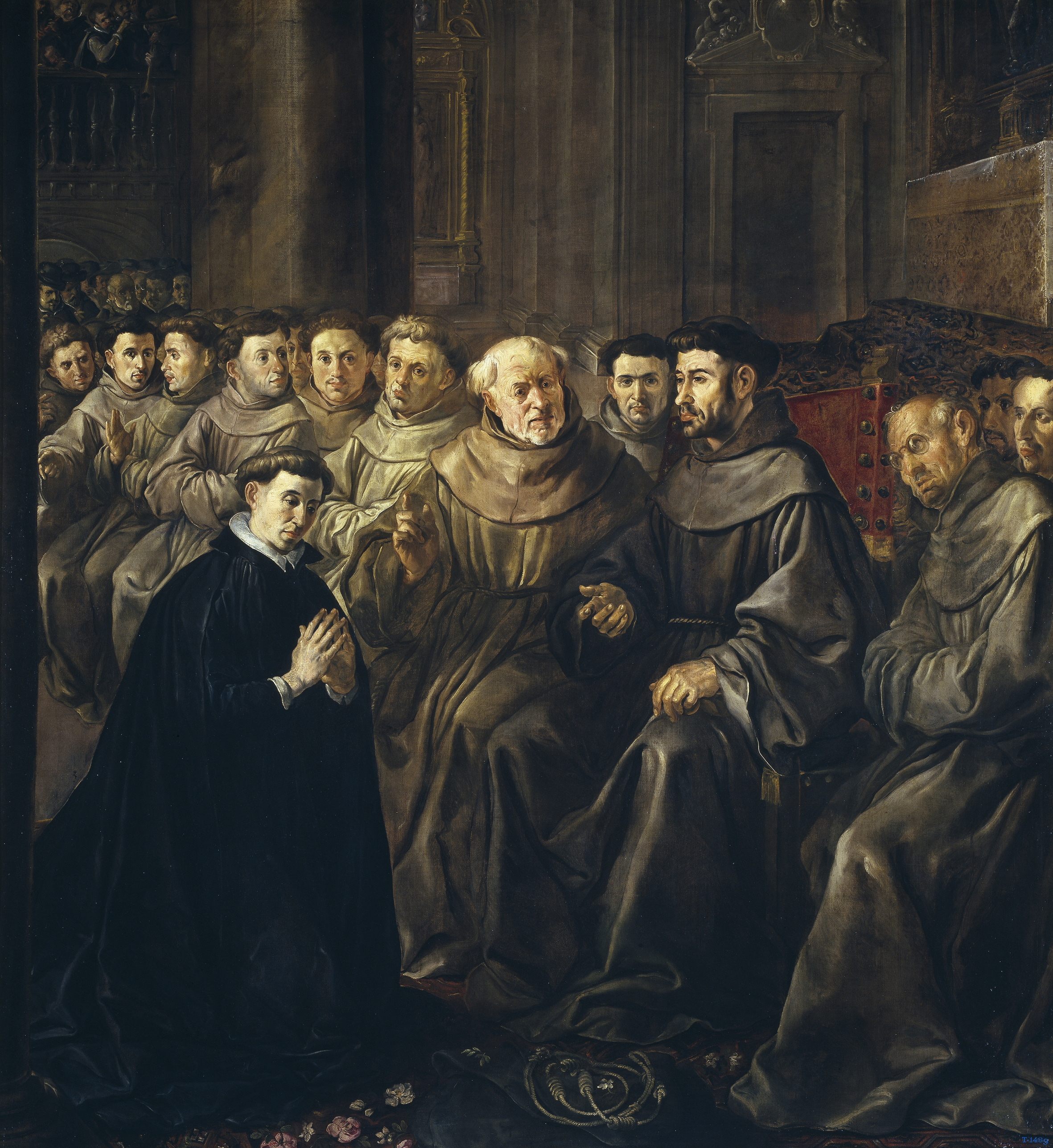
3, Herrera, Saint Bonaventure Taking the Habit of the Franciscan Order, Museo del Prado, Madrid

4, Herrera, Saint Bonaventura Receiving Communion from the Hands of an Angel, Louvre, Paris

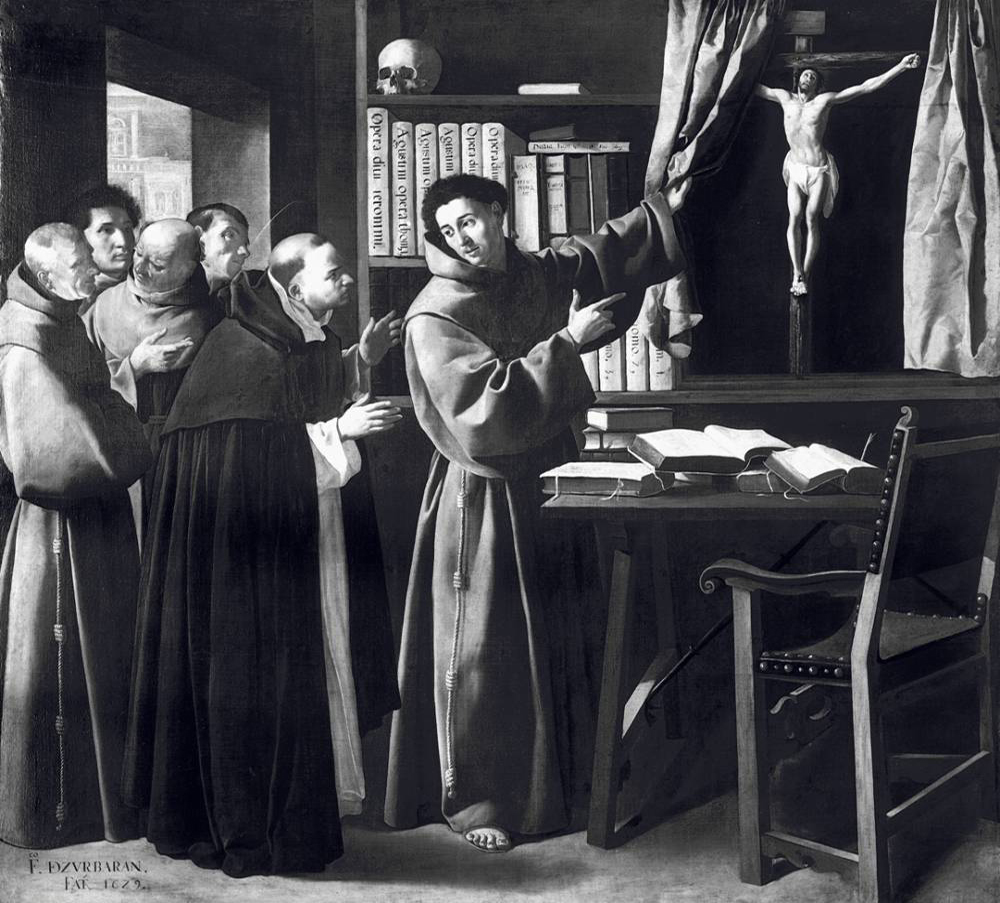
5, Zurbarán, Saint Bonaventure and Saint Thomas Aquinas before the Crucifix, formerly Kaiser-Friedrich-Museum, Berlin, destroyed 1945

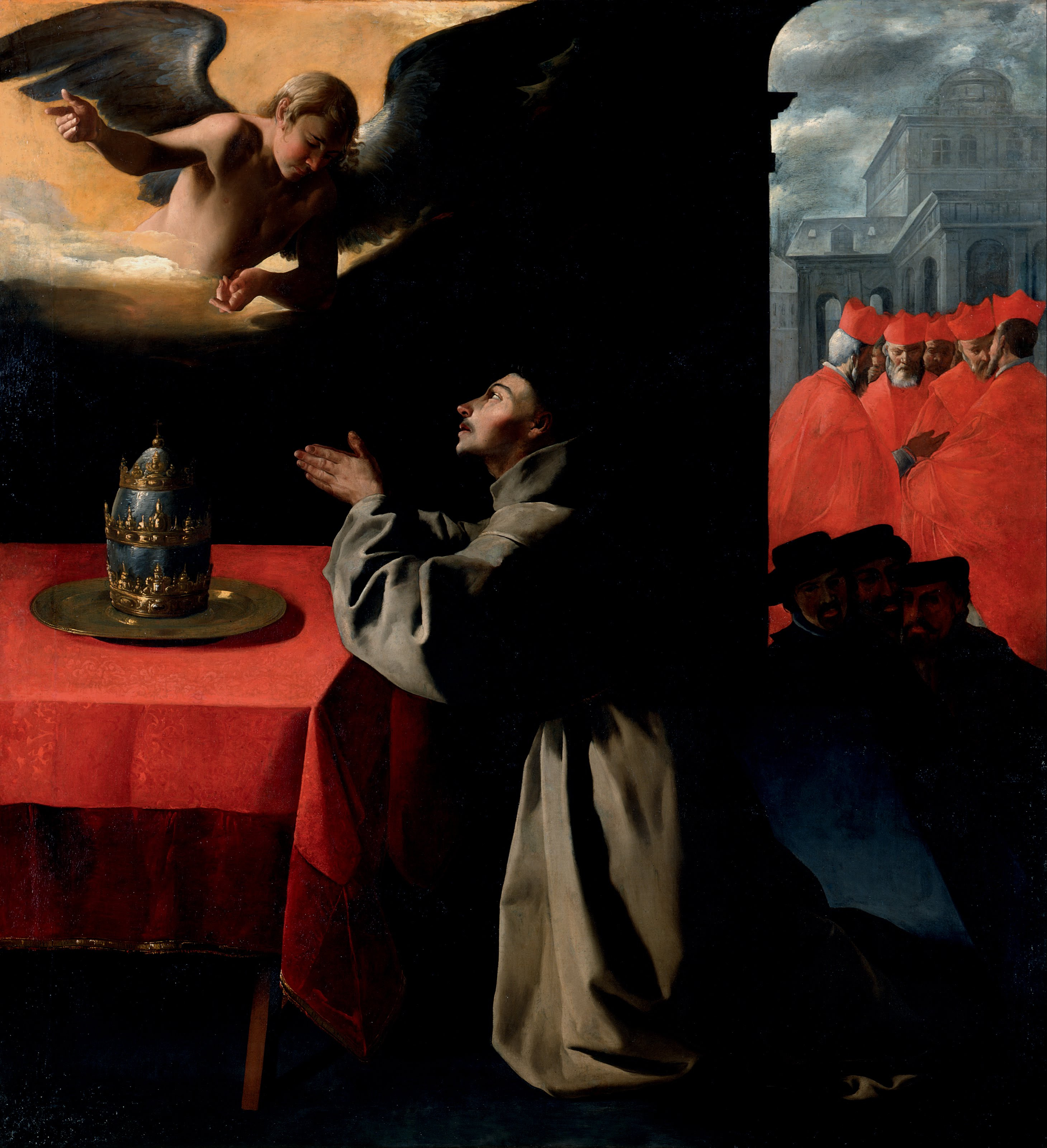
6, Zurbarán, Saint Bonaventure Inspired by an Angel Regarding the Election of a New Pope, Gemäldegalerie Alte Meister, Dresden, Germany

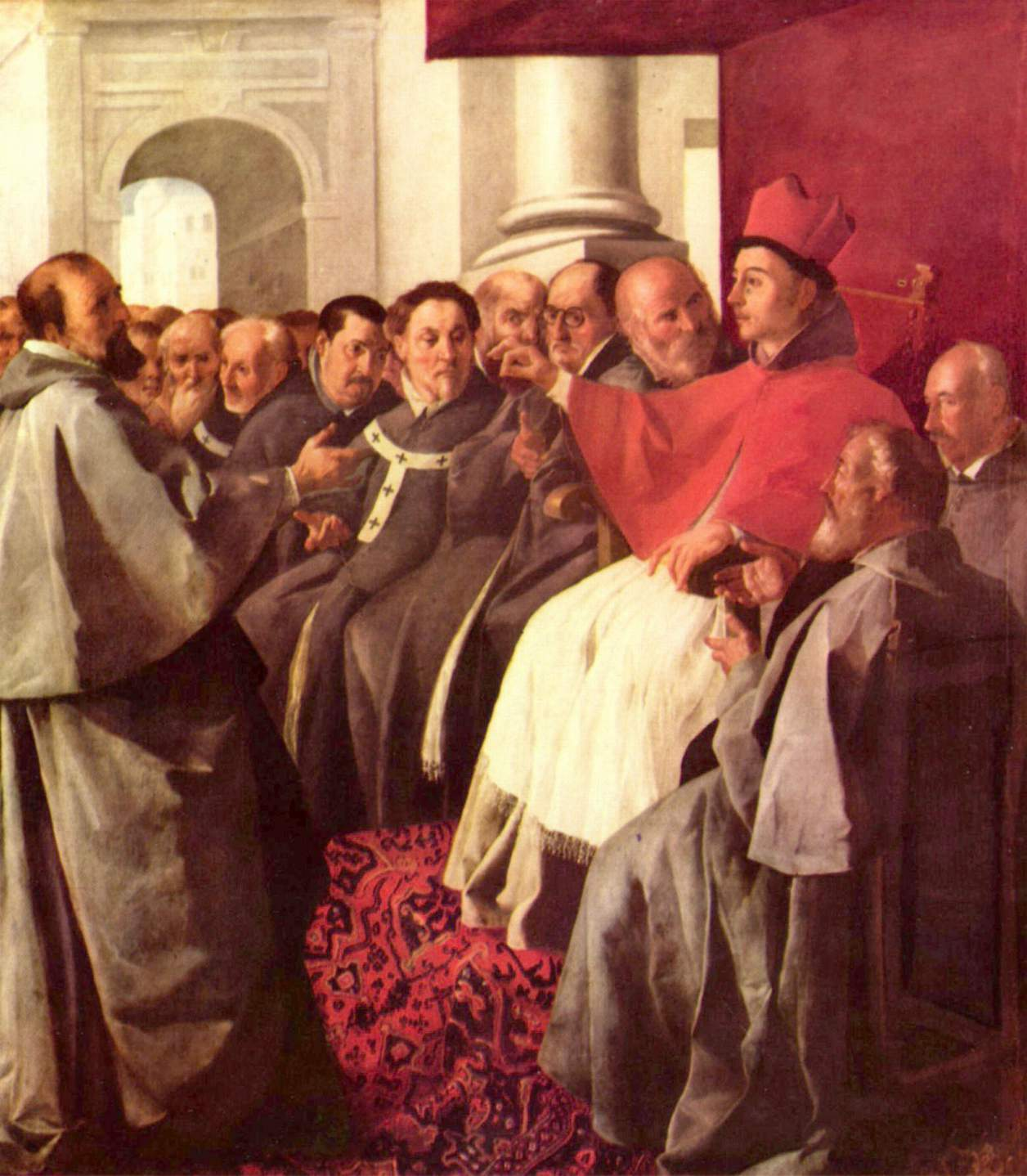
7, Zurbarán, Saint Bonaventure at the Council of Lyons, Louvre, Paris

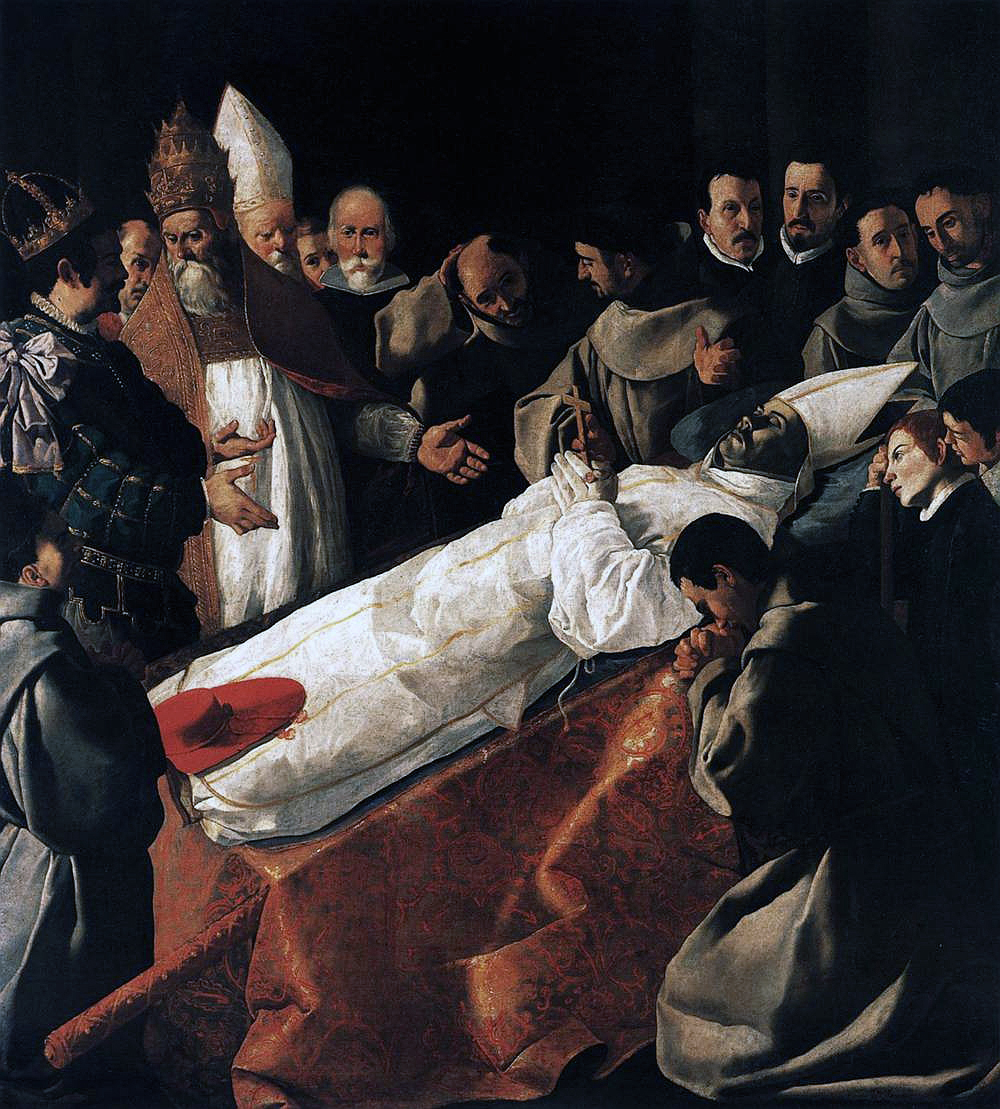
8, Zurbarán, Saint Bonaventure on His Bier, Louvre, Paris

== Literature ==
(ordered by date)

- Baticle, Jeannine (1987). "The College of San Buenaventura, Seville". In Baticle, Jeannine (ed.). Zurbarán (PDF). New York City: Metropolitan Museum of Art. pp. 81–93. ISBN 978-0-87099-502-6. LCCN 87018596. OCLC 16228296. OL 2389382M. Wikidata Q70023717.
- del Castillo y Utrilla, María José (1988). "La iglesia y el colegio de San Buenaventura de Sevilla en el siglo XIX" (PDF). Laboratorio de Arte: Revista del Departamento de Historia del Arte (1): 189–198. ISSN 1130-5762.
- Salinas Alonso, Víctor (1991). "Dos planos del convento y huerta de San Francisco en Sevilla". Atrio. Revista de Historia del Arte (in Spanish) (3): 171–174. ISSN 0214-8293. Wikidata Q108286336.
- Fernández Rojas, Matilde (1996). Patrimonio artístico de los conventos masculinos desamortizados en Sevilla durante el siglo XIX. Trinitarios, franciscanos, mercedarios, jerónimos, cartujos, mínimos, obregones, menores y filipenses. Secretariado de Publicaciones de la Diputación de Sevilla. ISBN 978-84-7798-273-9.
- Martínez Ripoll, Antonio (1996). La iglesia del colegio de San Buenaventura. Secretariado de Publicaciones de la Diputación de Sevilla. ISBN 84-7798-134-5.
- Navarrete Prieto, Benito; Pérez Sánchez, Alfonso Emilio (1996). "Sobre Herrera «El Viejo»". Archivo Español de Arte (in Spanish). 69 (276): 365–387. doi:10.3989/aearte.1996.v69.i276.608. Wikidata Q108224330.
- Chavero Blanco, Francisco de Asís (1999). "Iglesia del convento de San Buenaventura de Sevilla: lectura iconológica". El franciscanismo en Andalucía: conferencias del III Curso de Verano San Francisco en la cultura y en la historia del arte andaluz (in Spanish): 55–85. Wikidata Q108635662.
- Witko, Andrzej (2016). ""The path to God". Francisco de Herrera the Elder's wall paintings in the Franciscan Church of St. Bonaventure in Seville". Folia Historica Cracoviensia. 22: 579–599. doi:10.15633/fhc.2097. Wikidata Q108202503.
- Ostrow, Steven F. (2017). "Zurbarán's Cartellini: Presence and the Paragone". The Art Bulletin. 99 (1): 67–96. doi:10.1080/00043079.2017.1265286. Wikidata Q57678221.
- Fernández González, Alberto (2018). "El desaparecido colegio sevillano de San Buenaventura: nuevos documentos gráficos". Archivo Español de Arte (in Spanish). 91 (362): 127–142. doi:10.3989/aearte.2018.09. Wikidata Q108223262.
