= Jan Oskar Wawrzyniak =

Polish philosopher of language (born 1975)

Jan Wawrzyniak
- Born: 1975
- Scientific career
- Fields: philosophy of language

Jan Oskar Wawrzyniak (born 1975) philosopher specializing in the philosophy of language, professor at the University of the Commission of National Education in Kraków.

== Biography ==
In 1999 he completed his master's degree in philosophy at the Jagiellonian University. In 2004 he obtained his Ph.D. in philosophy at the Jagiellonian University based on his thesis Krytyka metafizyki w późnych pismach Ludwiga Wittgensteina (The Critique of Metaphysics in the Late Writings of Ludwig Wittgenstein) supervised by Włodzimierz Galewicz. In 2016 he obtained his habilitation in philosophy in the field of humanities based on his thesis Znaczenie i wartość w filozofii Johna McDowella i Barry’ego Strouda. Przedmiot refleksji czy redukcji (Meaning and Value in the Philosophy of John McDowell and Barry Stroud: The Subject of Reflection or Reduction) at the Pontifical University of John Paul II. He became a member of the editorial board of the Internet Philosophical Service "Diametros".

== Books ==
- Znaczenie i wartość w filozofii Johna McDowella i Barry'ego Strouda. Przedmiot refleksji czy redukcji. Księgarnia Akademicka. 2015.
