= The Miracle of the Loaves and Fishes (Murillo, Edinburgh) =

Painting by Bartolomé Esteban Murillo

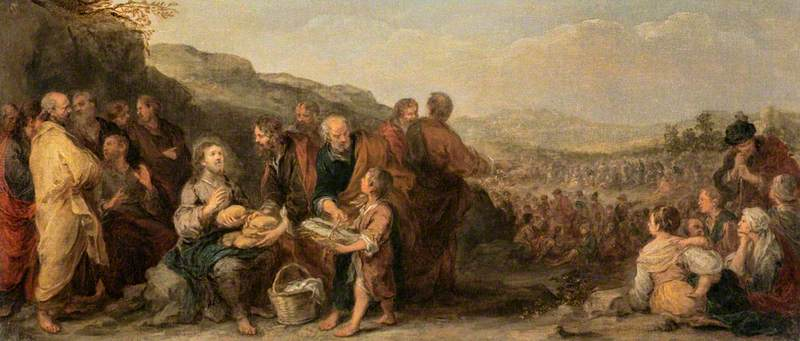
The Miracle of the Loaves and Fishes (c. 1667–1682)

The Miracle of the Loaves and Fishes is a c. 1667-1682 oil on canvas painting by Bartolomé Esteban Murillo, now in the National Galleries of Scotland after being accepted by the UK government in lieu of inheritance tax in 2005. It is a study for a work still in the artist's native Seville.
