= Andrzej Witko =

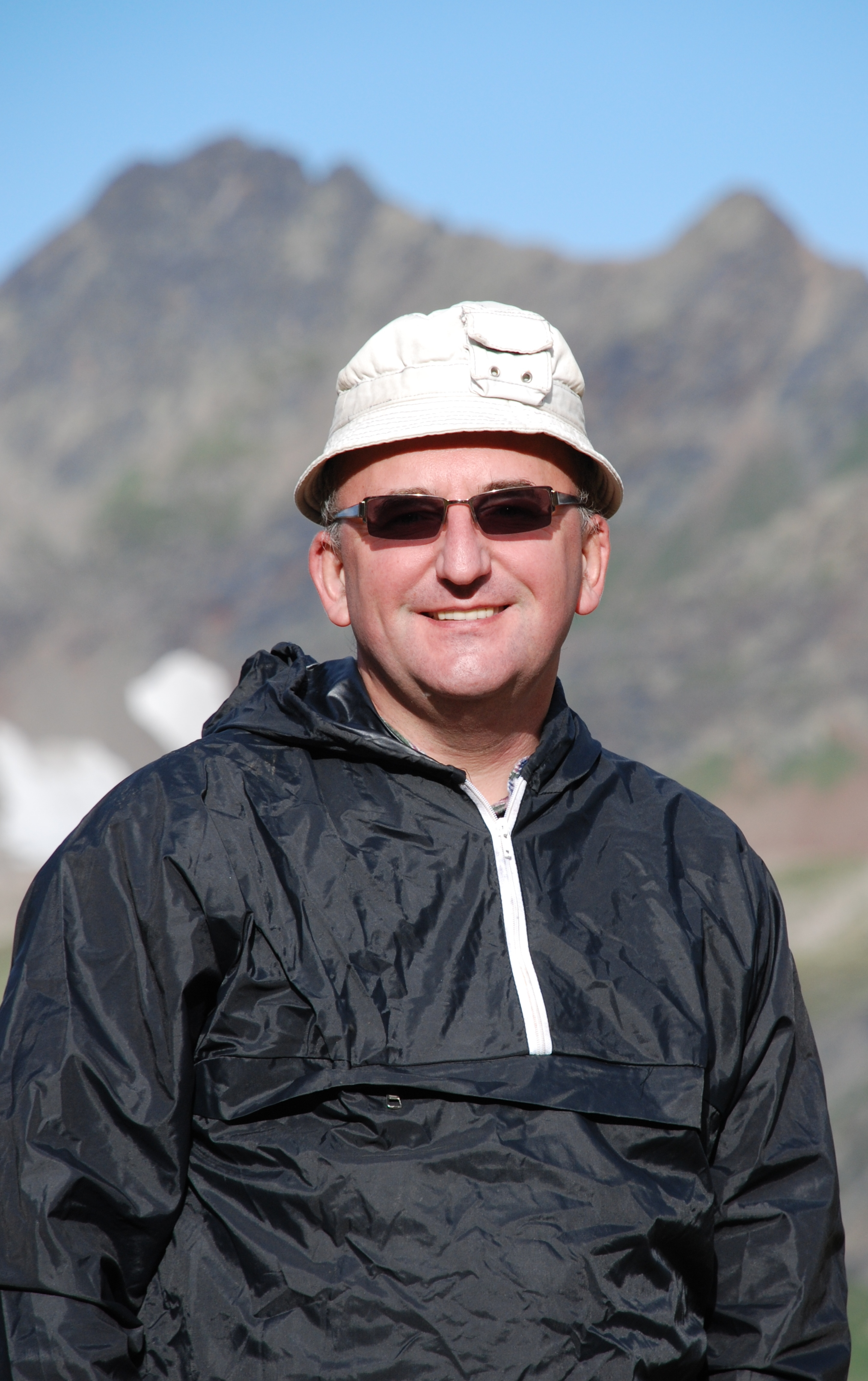
Fr. Andrzej Witko in 2008.

Andrzej Witko (born 9 April 1966) is a Polish Roman Catholic priest, art historian, and theologian of spirituality. He is a professor at the Pontifical University of John Paul II in Kraków.

Witko holds Doctor of Humanities and Doctor of Theology degrees. He is a member of the Royal Academy of Fine Arts of San Telmo in Spain, the Commission of Fine Arts of the Polish Academy of Learning, the Scientific Society of Catholic University of Lublin, and the Scientific Council of the Institute of Art of Polish Academy of Sciences.

Witko has written over forty books, published in Poland, Germany, Austria, Spain, Great Britain, Italy, Ireland and Slovakia, primarily on the history of art and culture and the issues of the Divine Mercy, including one prepared at the personal request of John Paul II: Święta Faustyna i Nabożeństwo do Miłosierdzia Bożego, Kraków 2001, 7 ed., which was published in English as The Divine Mercy and Sister Faustina, London 2000. The book attained third place on the bestsellers list in 2000. He wrote the libretto for the oratorio O Sancta Caritas (music by Artur Żalski). He has been awarded the Szczęsny Dettloff Prize and the Prize of the Prime Minister.

In March 2014 he received Kraków Book of the Month Award for the book Sewilskie malarstwo siedemnastego wieku. Od wizji mistycznych do martwych natur.
