= Pontifical University of John Paul II =

University in Kraków, Poland

Coordinates: 50°3′34″N 19°56′05″E

The Pontifical University of John Paul II in Krakow
- Uniwersytet Papieski Jana Pawła II w Krakowie
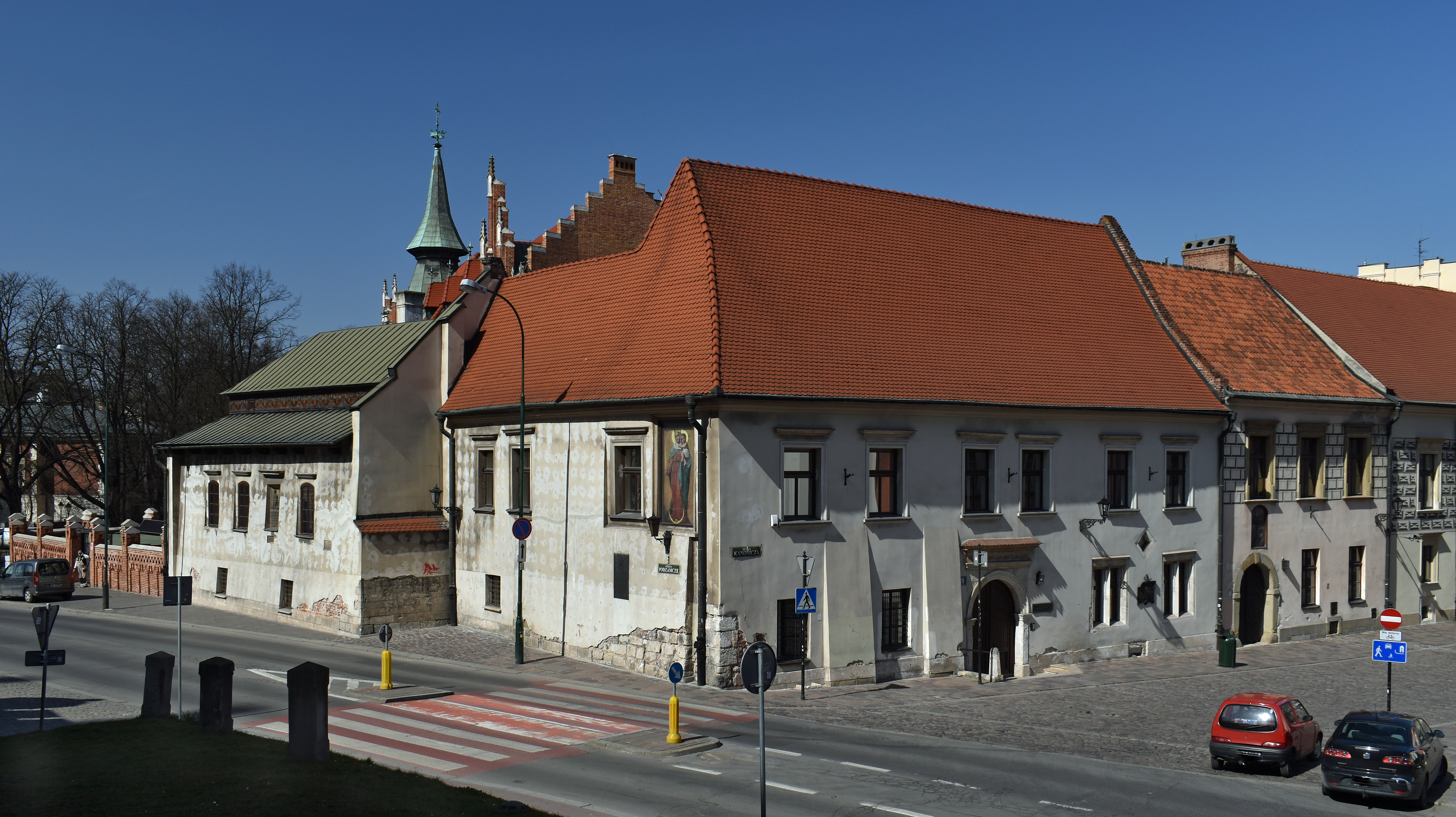
- Długosz House houses the rectorate of the University
- Latin: Pontificia Universitas Cracoviensis Ioannis Pauli II
- Type: Public
- Established: 1981
- Religious affiliation: Catholic Church
- Rector: Prof. dr hab. Robert Tyrała
- Students: 2,577 (12.2023)
- Location: ul. Kanonicza 25, 31-002 Kraków, Kraków, Poland
- Campus: Urban
- Website: upjp2.edu.pl
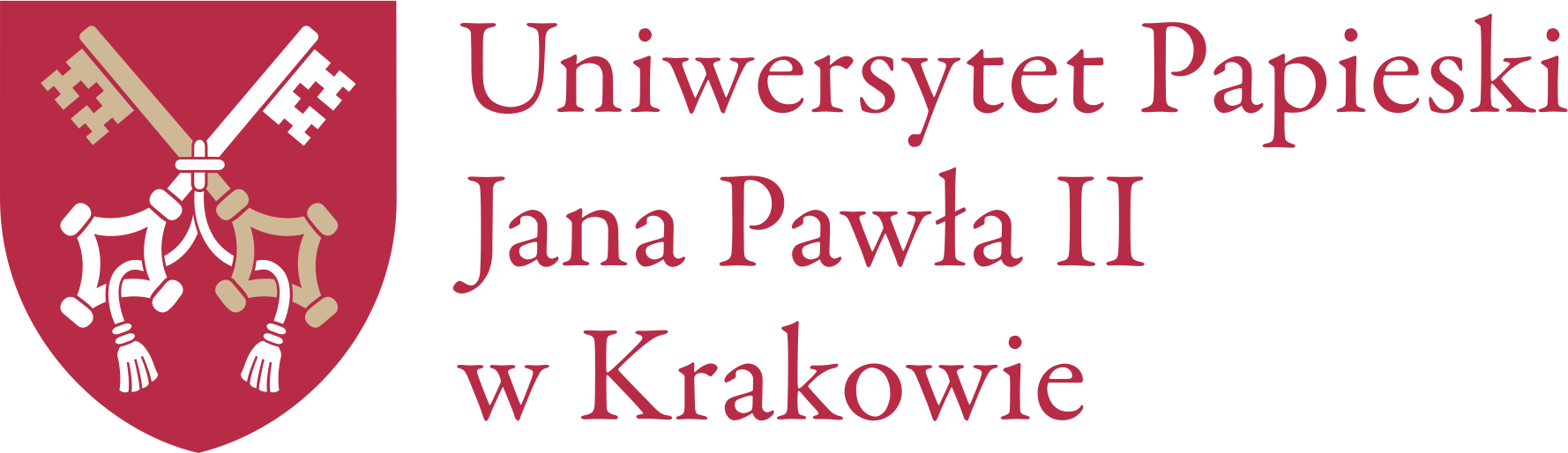

The Pontifical University of John Paul II in Krakow (Polish: Uniwersytet Papieski Jana Pawła II w Krakowie) is an academic institution located in Kraków, Poland, that offers graduate degrees in theology, philosophy, and church history. It derived from the theology faculty of Jagiellonian University established in 1397. The theology faculty was expelled from the university by Communist authorities in 1954. Remaining under the supervision of the Vatican, the faculty received the honorific title of "Pontifical" in 1974 and was established as an Academy of Theology by Pope John Paul II in 1981 before becoming the Pontifical University of John Paul II in 2009.

== History ==
=== Foundation of the Faculty ===
The Faculty of Theology at the Kraków Academy (now Jagiellonian University) was first established at the request of Queen Jadwiga and her husband Jagiełło. On 11 January 1397 Pope Boniface IX signed a bull patent allowing for the foundation of the Faculty. In the restoration act of 26 July 1400 the Faculty of Theology was listed as the most important faculty of the Academy. Professors of the Faculty were involved in the christianization of Lithuania. In 1817 Kraków Academy became Jagiellonian University in commemoration of Poland's Jagiellonian dynasty.

Throughout the existence of the Kingdom of Poland and further, during the partitions, and after the return to independence in 1918, most rectors of the Kraków Academy were drawn from theologians, who would become its most prominent personalities. Thanks to their reputation and the greatest number of students, the Academy was one of the main centres of Polish theological learning.

During World War II many professors of the Faculty were prisoners of the Nazi concentration camps. In spite of wartime repressions and deaths, underground education was carried out. In 1945 the teaching staff of the Faculty included professors from the Polish Eastern borderlands (i.e. Lviv).

=== After the expulsion ===
In 1954 the Faculty of Theology was removed from the university by an edict of the communist Cabinet. However, the Vatican issued a decree in 1959 stating that the Faculty of Theology "remains under the supervision of one ecclesiastic authority and in the future is to be formed according to the laws passed by the Apostolic see". In 1974 owing to the efforts of Cardinal Karol Wojtyła, the Archbishop of Kraków and future Pope John Paul II, the Faculty was bestowed the honourable title Pontifical.

The Pontifical Academy of Theology was established by Pope John Paul II on 8 December 1981, when he issued a motu proprio document entitled "Beata Hedvigis" prescribing that the Pontifical Academy be derived from the age-old Faculty of Theology of the Jagiellonian University.

In 1988 Włodzimierz Siedlik formed the Psalmodia Choir at the Liturgy Institute, and this was officially recognised as the choir of the Academy in 1996.

On 19 June 2009 by virtue of the decision of Pope Benedict XVI the Academy became the Pontifical University of John Paul II.

== Today ==
The Pontifical University of John Paul II carries on the traditions of the Faculty of Theology of the Jagiellonian University. It co-sponsors the international Center for Interdisciplinary Studies in science, and fosters scholarly works oriented toward bridging the gap between the natural sciences and the humanities.

== People ==
Michał Heller, recipient of the 2008 Templeton Prize, was a significant figure in the establishment of the Academy and continues to teach there today. Also associated with the Faculty in its early days were Karol Wojtyła (Pope John Paul II) and Józef Życiński. Andrzej Witko is professor, Polish Roman Catholic priest, art historian, and theologian of spirituality.

== Organizational structure ==
FACULTIES

- Faculty of Theology
- Faculty of Philosophy
- Faculty of History and Cultural Heritage
- Faculty of Social Science
- Faculty of Canon Law
- Faculty of Theology, Section in Tarnów

Faculties include institutes, sometimes inter-departmental, with one or more specializations:

- Institute of Bioethics
- Institute of Ecumenism and Dialogue
- Language School
- Postgraduate Studies of Journalism

== Enrollment ==
The Academy confers the degrees of master, licentiate, doctor and habilitated doctor. The faculties cooperate with numerous universities in Poland and abroad by organizing various symposia, sessions and interdisciplinary seminars, some of them international.

== See also ==
- Religion in Poland
- Roman Catholicism
