= Miguel Mañara =

Spanish monk (1627–1679)

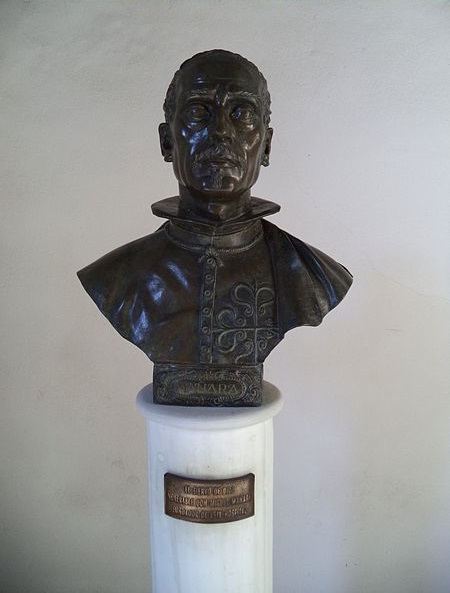
Bust of Mañara by José Lafita in the Hospital

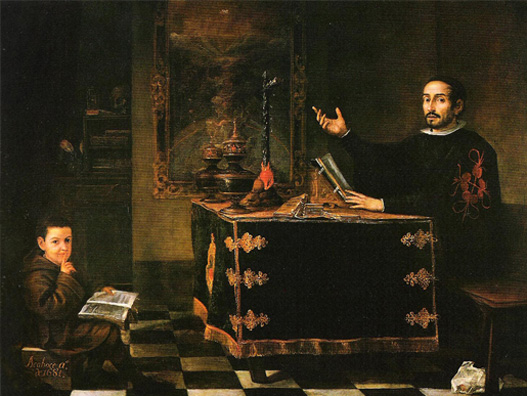
Miguel Mañara reading the Rule of the Hermandad de la Caridad (1681), painting by Juan de Valdés Leal, also in the Hospital

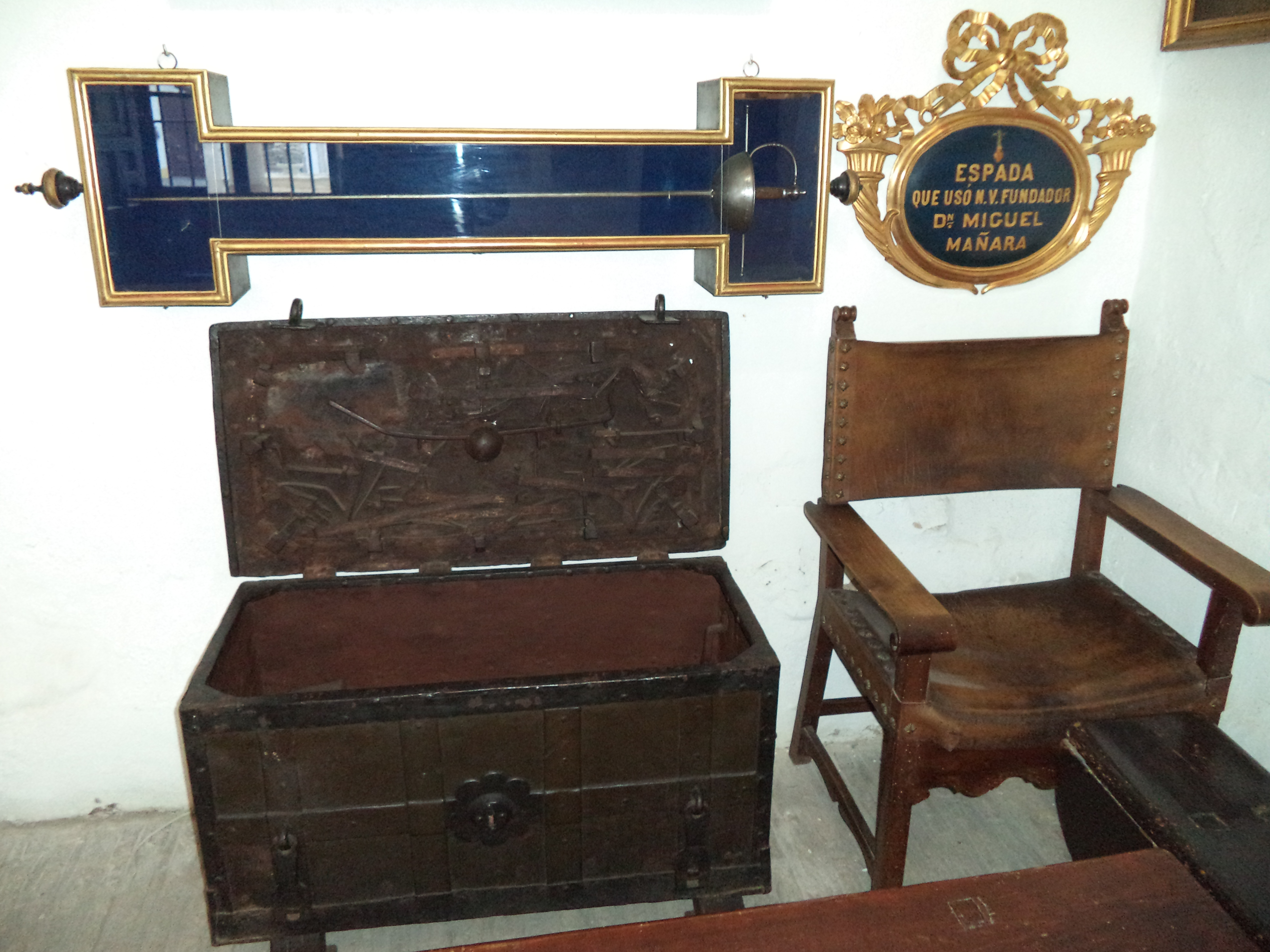
Mañara's sword over an old treasure-chest and chair in the hospital's council chamber

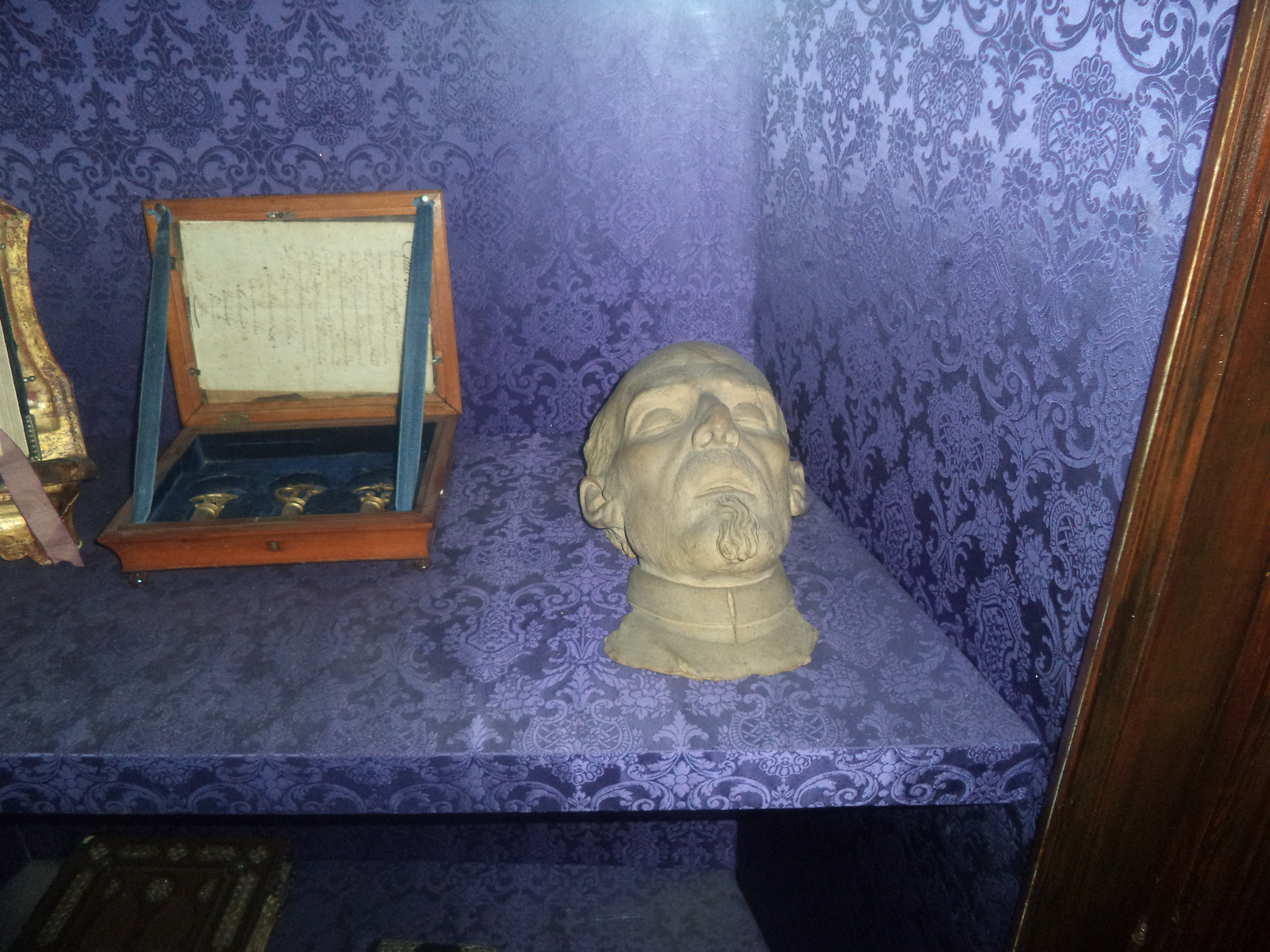
Mañara's death mask

Miguel Mañara Vicentelo de Leca (3 March 1627 – 9 May 1679) was the main founder of the Hospital de la Caridad in Seville.

== Life ==
=== Family background ===
Born in Seville, his family originated in Corsica. His father Tomás Mañara Leca y Colona had been born in Calvi.

=== Death ===
A cause for Mañara's beatification was formally opened on 24 September 1754, granting him the title of Servant of God.

== Appearances in literature ==
In French literature Mañara was the subject of Prosper Merimée's novella Les Âmes du purgatoire (1834) and Alexandre Dumas's play Don Juan de Marana ou la chute d'un ange (1836). Théophile Gautier, Antoine de Latour, Edmond Haraucourt and Pierre-Paul Raoul Colonna de Cesari Rocca also wrote about him, while Maurice Barrès dedicated a chapter to him in Du sang de la volupté et de la mort (1900)

Don Juan de Marana was also the title of an opera by the British writer Arnold Bennett. In the 20th century Apollinaire also wrote about him, while the brothers Manuel and Antonio Machado produced the play Don Juan de Mañara (1927). There is also a four-act opera with six music-frames by Henri Tomasi and a libretto adapted from Oscar Venceslas de Lubicz-Milosz's play Miguel Mañara. Finally, Esther van Loo produced a pseudo-historical biography Le vrai Don Juan, Don Miguel Mañara, published in Paris in 1950.

== Bibliography ==
- (in Spanish) Discurso de la verdad, Sevilla, 1778, en la imprenta de Don Luis Bexinez y Castilla, Impresor Mayor de la Ciudad, edición facsímil, Mairena del Aljarafe, 2007, Extramuros Edición.
- (in Spanish) Carlos Ros Carballar, Miguel Mañara, caballero de los pobres, (2002), Editorial San Pablo.
- (in Spanish) Juan Pablo Navarro Rivas, Miguel Mañara. El rico que sirvió a los pobres, (2017), Editorial Maratania.
