= Hospital de la Caridad (Seville) =

La Hospital de la Caridad
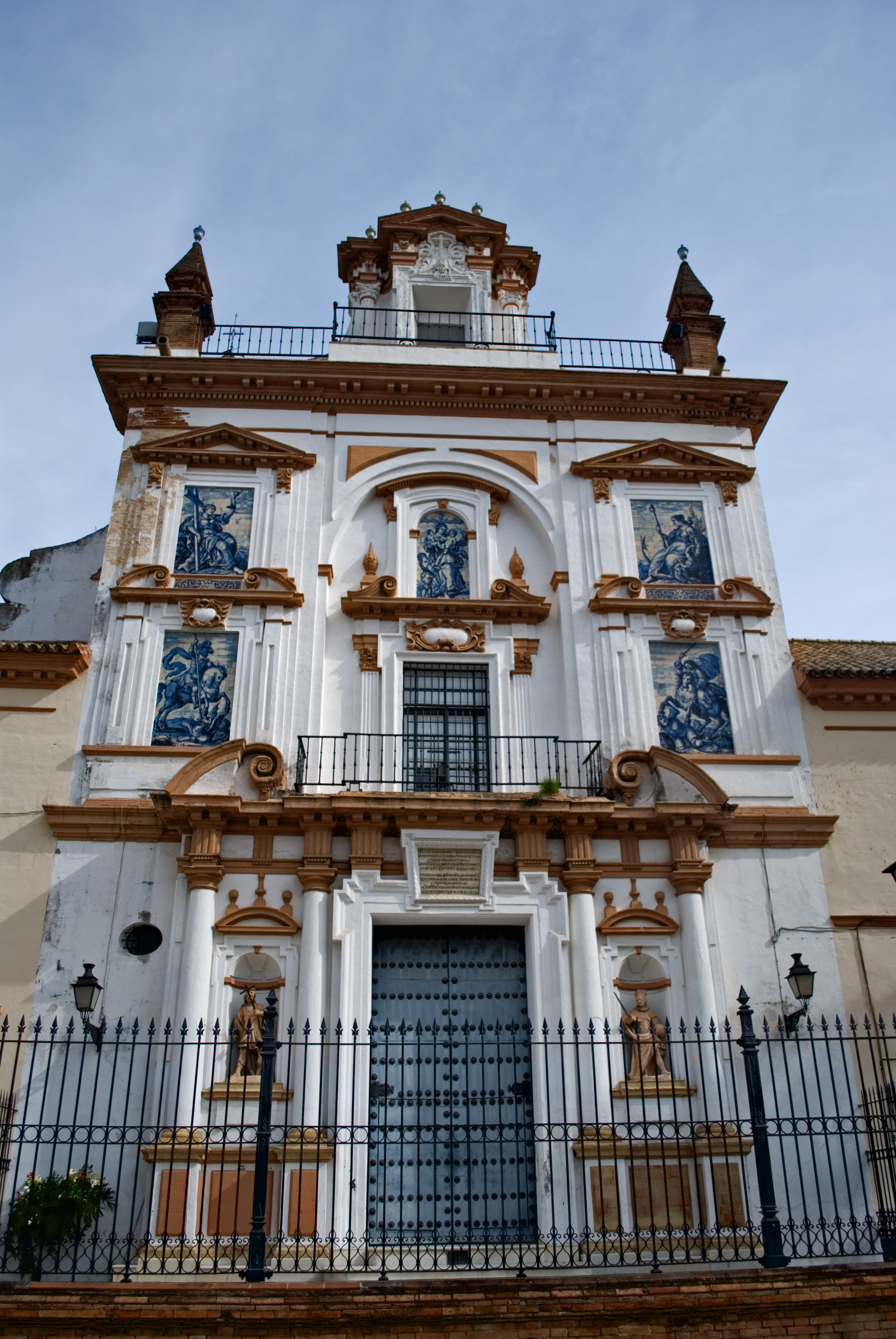
- Facade of the Hospital de la Caridad

Geography
- Location: Seville, Spain
- Coordinates: 37°23′03″N 5°59′44″W

Organisation
- Type: Charity hospital

History
- Opened: 1674

Links
- Lists: Hospitals in Spain

The Hospital de la Caridad is a Roman Catholic baroque charity hospital building near Plaza de toros de la Real Maestranza de Caballería de Sevilla in Spain. The hospital is dedicated to the Blessed Virgin Mary under the venerated title of Our Lady of Charity, where a venerated 15th—century image is enshrined within the Church of Saint George of Lydda within the hospital property.

The charity hospital was founded in 1674, and still cares for the aged and infirm. The hospital's chapel is open to the public and "contains some of Seville's most sumptuous baroque sculpture."

Bartolomé Esteban Murillo in 1668 painted eight paintings commissioned for Seville's Hermandad de la Caridad, to which the artist himself belonged and one of whose commandments was to clothe the naked.

Four of those eight works remain in Seville:

- The Miracle of the Loaves and Fishes
- Moses at the Rock of Horeb
- Saint Elizabeth of Hungary (Repatriated to Spain 1815)
- Saint John of God Carrying a Sick Man

Whereas, the other four works were looted by Napoleonic commander and Marechal Nicolas Jean-de-Dieu Soult in 1810 (The Return of the Prodigal Son, National Gallery of Art, Washington; The Healing of the Paralytic, National Gallery, London; Abraham Receiving the Three Angels, National Gallery of Canada, Ottawa; The Liberation of Saint Peter, Hermitage Museum, Saint Petersburg).

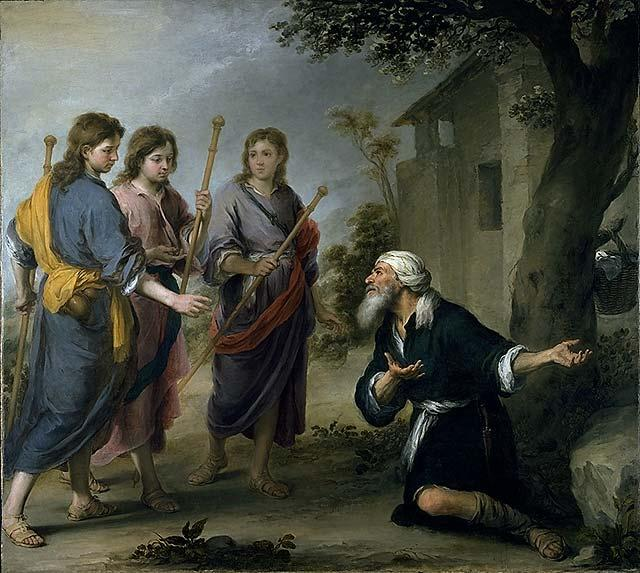
Abraham and the Three Angels (c. 1670–1674)

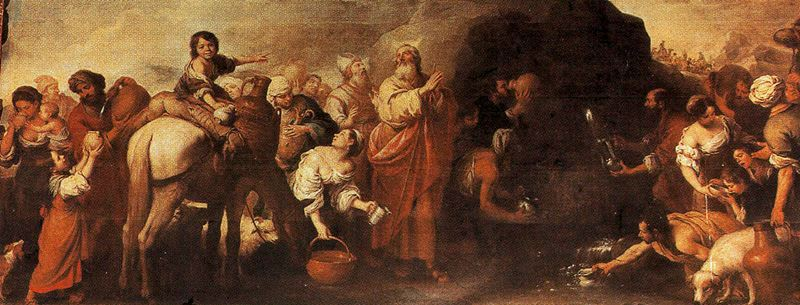
Moses at the Rock of Horeb (1669–1670)

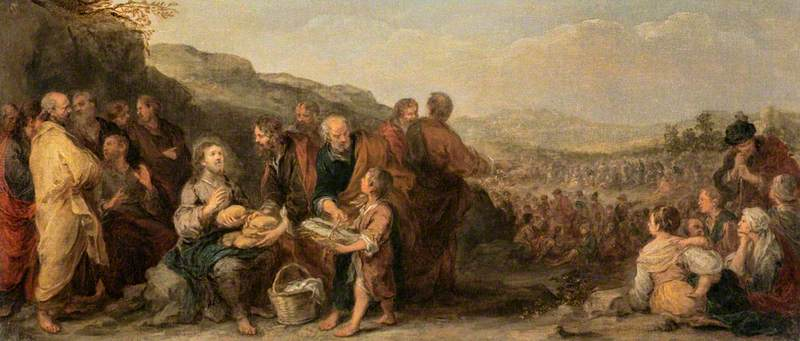
The Miracle of the Loaves and Fishes (c. 1667–1682) Copy Study in the National Galleries of Scotland for the original "The Miracle of the Loaves and Fishes "1669-1670" or "1670–1674"

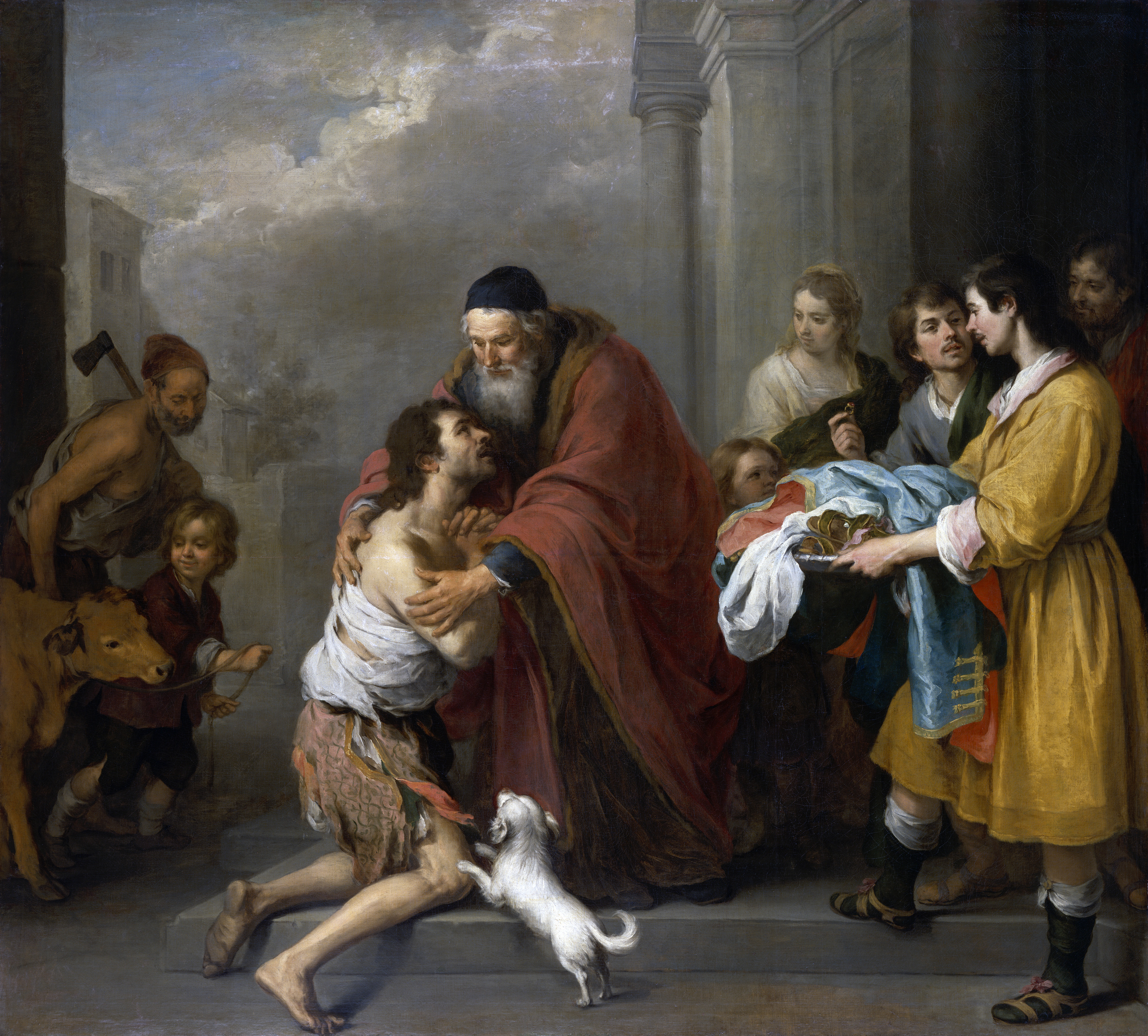
The Return of the Prodigal Son (c. 1667–1670)

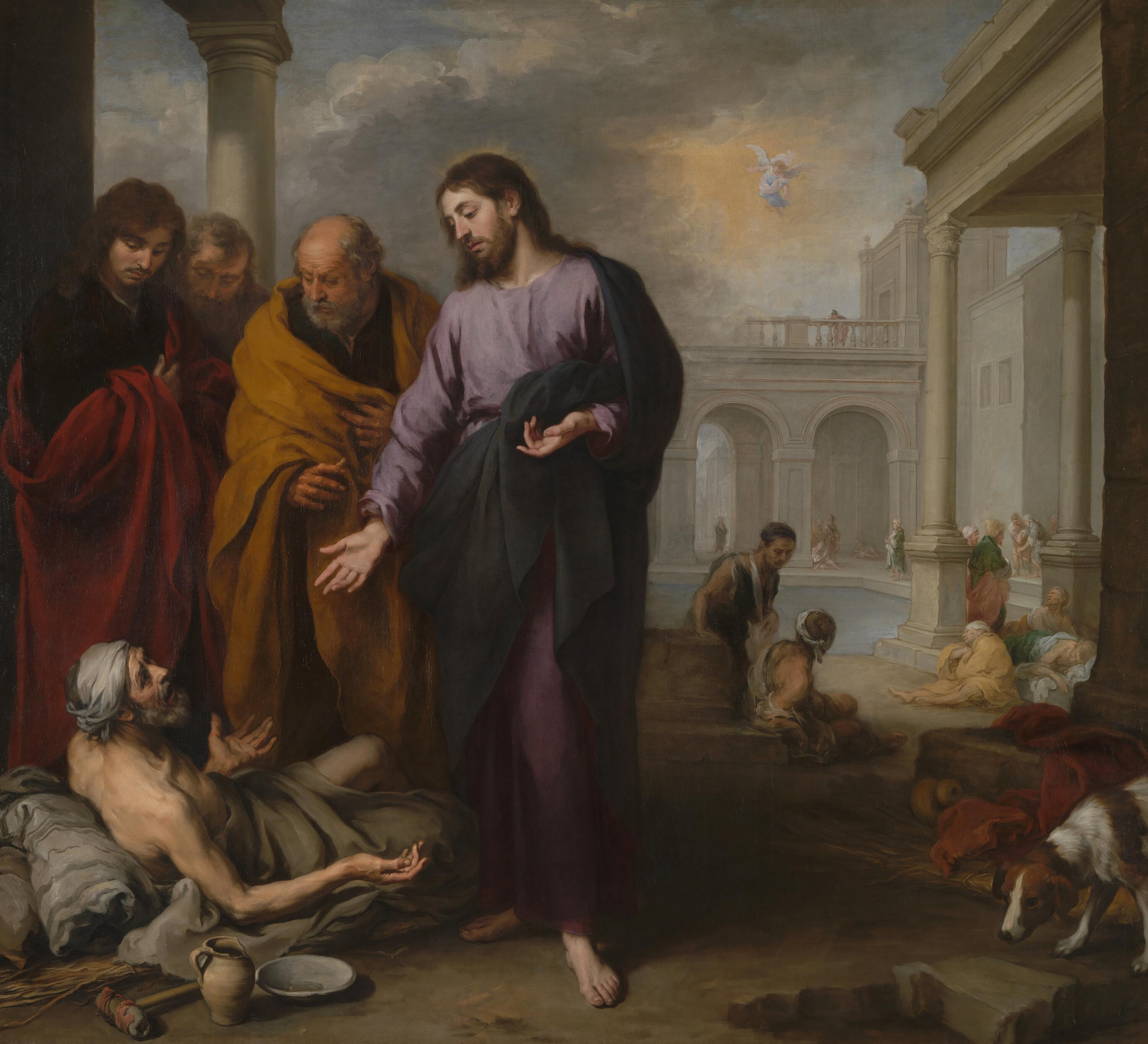
Christ Healing the Paralytic at the Pool of Bethesda (1667–1670)

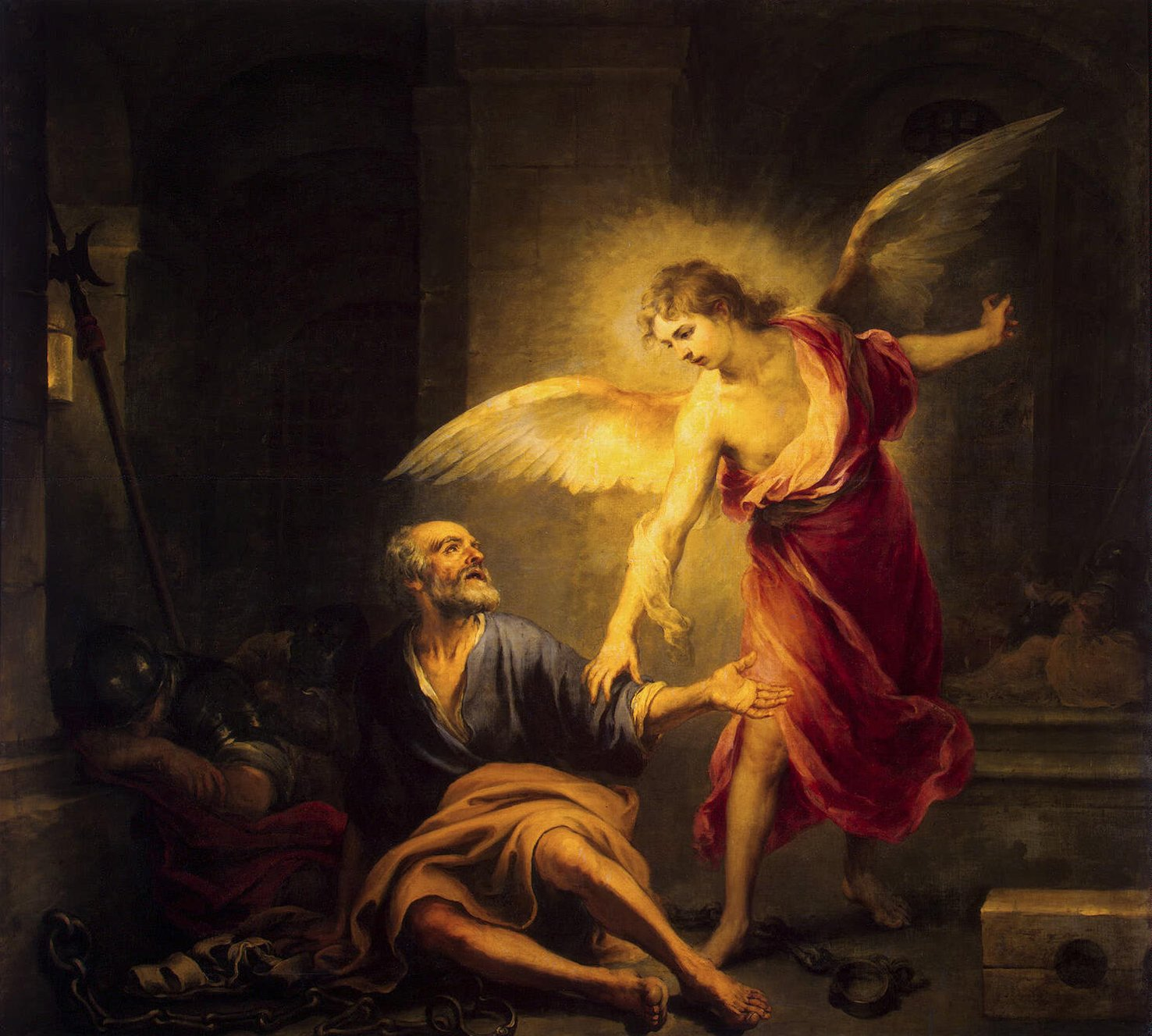
The Liberation of Saint Peter (1665–1667)

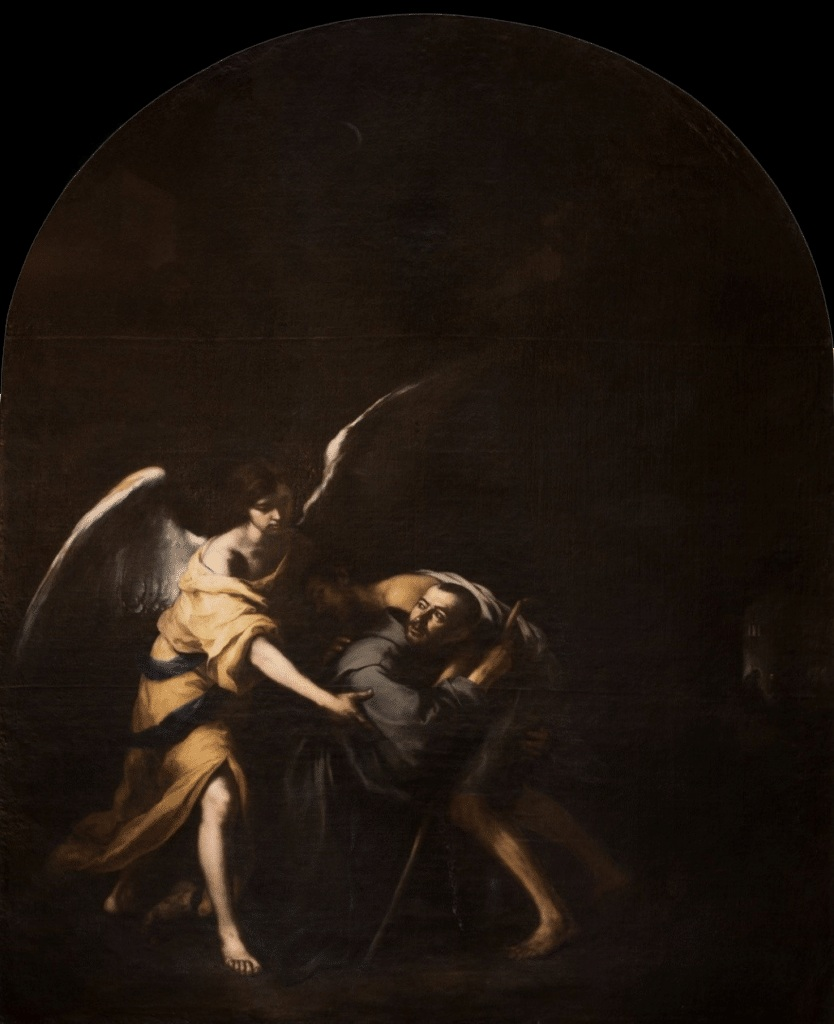
Saint John of God Carrying a Sick Man (1672)

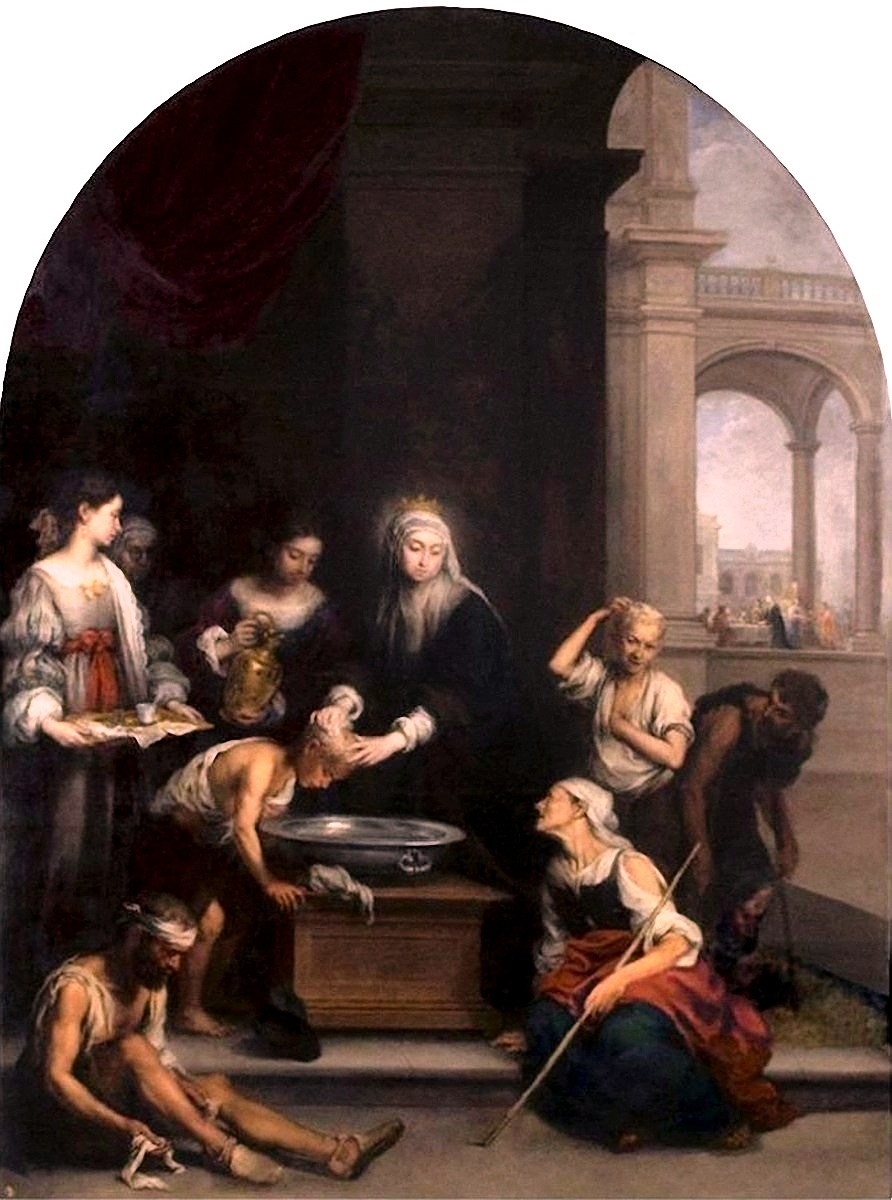
Saint Elizabeth of Hungary Curing the Sick (1672)
