= Saint Elizabeth of Hungary Curing the Sick =

1672 painting by Bartolomé Esteban Murillo

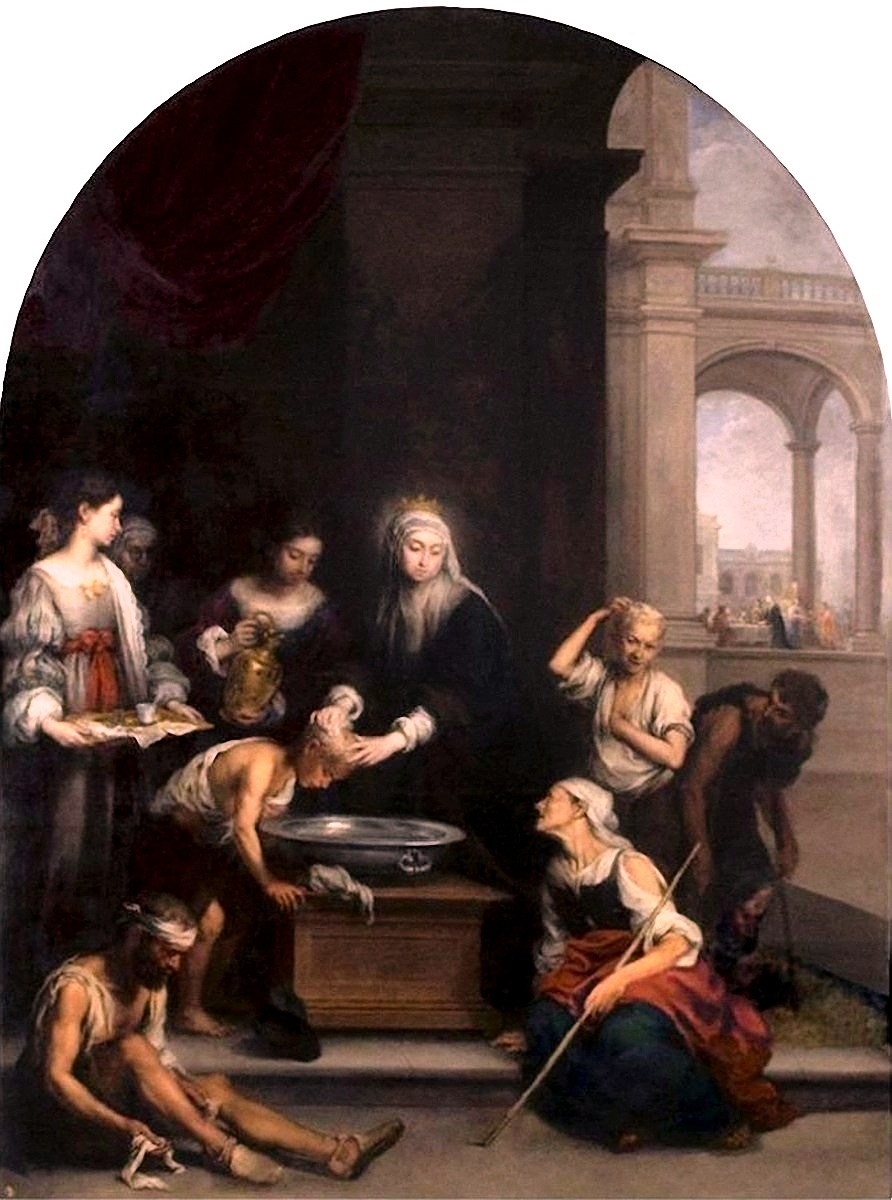
Saint Elizabeth of Hungary Curing the Sick (1672) by Bartolomé Esteban Murillo

Saint Elizabeth of Hungary Curing the Sick is an oil on canvas painting by Bartolomé Esteban Murillo, created in 1672, commissioned by Miguel de Mañara for the church of San Jorge in the Hospital de la Hermandad de la Caridad in Seville, where it still hangs in its original position. Showing Elizabeth of Hungary pouring water on the head of a child affected by tinea capitis, it forms part of a group of Murillo works in the church on the works of pity and the exercise of charity.

It remained in its original location until Charles IV of Spain moved it to the Alcázar de Sevilla for José María Cortés to copy it, planning to send the original to the Real Museo de Madrid and placing the copy in the Hospital. However, in 1812 Marshal Soult looted the original and sent it to be displayed at the Musee Napoleon in Paris. Three years later the Bourbon Restoration saw the work returned to Spain, though the Louvre's director Vivant Denon tried in vain to prevent its return. Initially hanging in the Real Academia de Bellas Artes de San Fernando de Madrid, the king ordered it to be moved to the Prado Museum. The Hospital made numerous requests for the painting's return and the Real Academia Sevillana de Buenas Letras and Academia de Bellas Artes de Sevilla also sent two letters to the Ministry of Public Education to that purpose, though it was only finally returned to the Hospital in 1939.
