= The Miracle of the Loaves and Fishes (Murillo, Seville) =

Oil painting

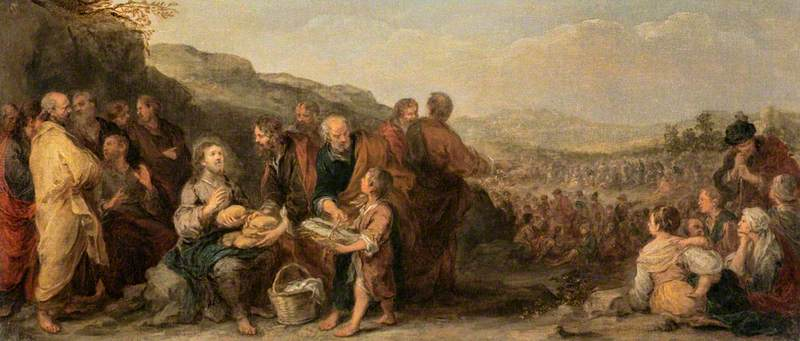
The Miracle of the Loaves and Fishes (c. 1667–1682) a work study from the National galleries of Scotland for the original painting in Seville

The Miracle of the Loaves and Fishes is a 1669–1670 or 1670–1674 oil on canvas painting by Bartolomé Esteban Murillo, still in the Hospital de la Caridad in Seville for which it was originally painted, though an earlier study for it now hangs in Edinburgh. It was restored in 2018.
