= Moses at the Rock of Horeb =

Painting by Bartolomé Esteban Murillo

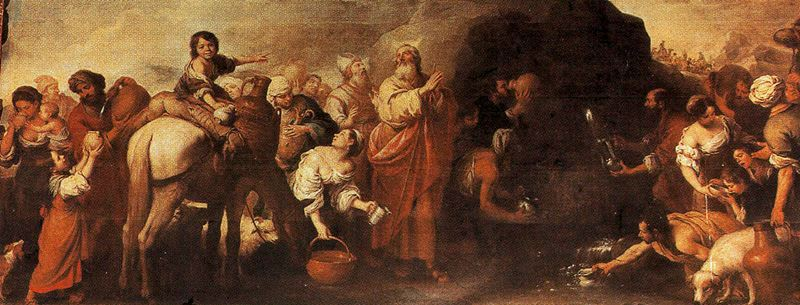
- Artist: Bartolomé Esteban Murillo
- Completion date: 1670 or 1674
- Medium: Oil on canvas
- Location: Seville, Spain

Moses at the Rock of Horeb, Moses and the Water from the Rock of Horeb, or Moses Striking the Rock, is a 1669–1670 or 1670–1674 oil on canvas painting by Bartolomé Esteban Murillo, still in the Hospital de la Caridad in Seville for which it was originally painted. It was restored in 2018.
